= Lev Vlodzimirsky =

Soviet state security official

- Born: 10 January 1905; Barnaul, Russian Empire
- Died: 23 December 1953 (aged 48); Moscow, Russian SFSR, Soviet Union
- Cause of death: Execution by shooting
- Military career
- Allegiance: Soviet Union (1919–1953)
- Branch: OGPU (1928–1934); NKVD (1934–1946); NKGB (1941–1953)
- Service years: 1919–1953
- Rank: Lieutenant General
- Conflicts: Russian Civil War

Lev Emelyanovich Vlodzimirsky (Russian: Лев Емельянович Влодзимирский; 10 January 1905 – 23 December 1953) was a Soviet state security official.

A close associate of Lavrentiy Beria and known for his cruelty during interrogations, Vlodzimirsky was arrested and executed on accounts of treason alongside Beria and his close allies in 1953.

== Biography ==
=== Early life ===
Vlodzimirsky's ancestors were Polish revolutionaries exiled to the Ural steppes. His father was a cavalry captain, his mother came from a Cossack family. His father supported the Red Army during the Russian Civil War, and served as a district military commandant in Zaraysk. After completing his education Vlodzimirsky joined the Red Army. From January 1919 he was assistant driver in the fleet on the Southern and South-Western fronts (until November 1920) and a boatswain of the Sevastopol military port from December 1920 to April 1925). He was a member of the Komsomol from 1921 and joined the Communist Party in 1931.

=== Security official ===
Vlodzimirsky began his service in the state security authorities in May 1928, in one of the 12 districts of the Joinst State Political Directorate (OGPU). Then to April 1930 he served in its administration, and until July 1934 in the administration of the North Caucasian district of the OGPU. From July 1934 to 1937 in the Secret Political Department (SPO) of the State Security Directorate of the Caucasian NKVD. In May 1938, he was transferred to the NKVD headquarters in Lubyanka, where he served in the Secret Political Department of the Main State Security Directorate (GUGB) at the People's Commissariat of Internal Affairs until December 22, 1938. In 1939 he worked at the Central Economic Board, then transferred to counterintelligence, where he was the first deputy head of Department 3 of the Main Directorate of State Security. In July 1939, on the orders of Beria, together with other NKVD officers, he murdered the USSR ambassador to China, Ivan Bovkun-Luganets, and his wife. After the reorganization of the security and intelligence agencies in February 1941, which resulted in the creation of a separate division called the People's Commissariat for State Security (NKGB), Vlodzimirsky became the head of the LKBP Investigation Service, later, until May 1946, he worked in one of the LKBP's Boards (from 1946 year of the Ministry of State Security of the USSR. Vlodzimirsky was involved in the investigation of the Leningrad affair and personally interrogated many of the defendants and oversaw their cases.

After the death of Stalin and the unification under the leadership of Beria of all internal affairs bodies on March 18, 1953, Vlodzimirsky was appointed head Investigative unit for especially important cases of the Ministry of Internal Affairs of the USSR.

=== Arrest and execution ===
On July 17, 1953, after the arrest of Beria, Vlodzimirsky was removed from his post, arrested and dismissed from the Ministry of Internal Affairs as a "member of the Beria gang." By a special judicial presence of the Supreme Court of the Soviet Union on December 23, 1953, together with Beria, Bogdan Kobulov, Vsevolod Merkulov, Sergo Goglidze, Vladimir Dekanozov and Pavel Meshik, he was sentenced to death as well as confiscation of personal property and stripped from all military honors.

=== Rehabilitation ===
On May 29, 2000, the Military Collegium of the Supreme Court of the Russian Federation denied the full rehabilitation of Vlodzimirsky although the same time partially changed the verdict of the Special Judicial Presence of December 23, 1953, reclassifying the deeds of the convicts, excluding the charge of treason and imposing a punishment for official crimes in the form of abuse of power in the presence of especially aggravating circumstances in the form of 25 years of imprisonment posthumously, canceling accordingly the instruction on the application of confiscation of property.
