= Pyotr Fedotov =

Soviet Intelligence officer (1900–1963)

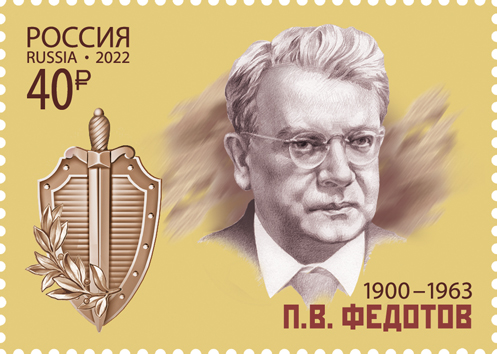
- Fedotov on a 2022 stamp of Russia

Head of the Second Main Directorate of the KGB
- In office 1954–1956
- Preceded by: Himself
- Succeeded by: Oleg Gribanov

Head of the 1st Main Directorate of the Ministry of Internal Affairs
- In office 1953–1954
- Preceded by: Office Established
- Succeeded by: Himself

Deputy Minister of State Security
- In office 1946–1947

Head of the 1st Directorate of MGB/Committee of Information
- In office September 7, 1946 – September 19, 1949
- Preceded by: Pyotr Kubatkin
- Succeeded by: Sergey Savchenko

Personal details
- Born: 18 December 1900 Saint Petersburg, Russian Empire
- Died: 28 September 1963 (aged 62) Moscow, Soviet Union
- Party: Communist Party of the Soviet Union

Military service
- Allegiance: Russian Soviet Federative Socialist Republic (1919–1922); Soviet Union (1922–1959)
- Branch/service: Red Army; Cheka; GPU; OGPU; NKVD; MGB; KGB
- Rank: Lieutenant general
- Battles/wars: Russian Civil War; World War II

Pyotr Vasilyevich Fedotov (Russian: Пётр Васильевич Федотов; 18 December 1900 – 29 September 1963) was a long time Soviet security and intelligence officer, the head of counterintelligence in NKVD/NKGB and head of foreign intelligence as the deputy chairman of the Committee of Information.

Fedotov was born in Saint Petersburg, into a family of conductors. From 1915 to 1919, he worked for the local newspaper. After the outbreak of the Russian Civil War, he served in the Red Army.

In 1921, Fedotov joined the new Soviet security organization, the Cheka. He first served in the local Cheka/GPU/OGPU offices. In 1937, he was moved to the NKVD Moscow Headquarters, known as Lubyanka, and was put in charge of one of the Secret Political Department Sections in the Main Directorate of State Security of the NKVD. He rose to the top of the NKVD during the Great Purge and is known to have taken part in brutal interrogations and forgeries involving Stalin's purported enemies. Between 1939 and 1941, he was the head of the GUGB 2nd Department (SPO). In 1940, he took part in the killing of Polish prisoners of war – the Katyn massacre. In 1941, after the creation of the People's Commissariat for State Security (NKGB), he became the head of the 2nd Directorate, responsible for counterintelligence. He personally signed a document of an interrogation on October 20, 1942, imposing a five-year gulag sentence on famous Polish actor Eugene Bodo (Eugeniusz Junod) who died in Kotlas in 1943, due to poor conditions (Russian red cross document from 1992). In 1946, after the People's Commissariat for State Security was renamed the Ministry for State Security (Ministerstvo Gosudarstvennoi Bezopasnosti) or MGB, Fedotov became the head of its 1st Directorate, responsible for foreign intelligence. When the Committee of Information was established in 1947, he was put in charge of foreign intelligence as the deputy chairman under Vyacheslav Molotov and then under Andrey Vyshinsky. In March 1953, he was moved to the Ministry of Internal Affairs (MVD) and took over its 1st Chief Directorate (counterintelligence). He took over the same position in the newly created KGB, but as the head of the 2nd Chief Directorate (counterintelligence), of which he was in charge until 1956. In May 1956, he started working at the KGB school as deputy head of one of the departments.

Fedotov retired from the KGB in 1959. He died in 1963 at the age of 63.
