= People's Commissariat for State Security =

Soviet secret police, intelligence and counter-intelligence force

- Народный комиссариат государственной безопасности

Agency overview
- Formed: 3 February 1941; 85 years ago 14 April 1943; 83 years ago
- Preceding agencies: Cheka (1917–1922); GPU (1922–1923); OGPU (1923–1934); NKVD (1934–1941) (1941–1943); GUGB (1934–1941)
- Dissolved: 20 July 1941; 85 years ago 15 March 1946; 80 years ago
- Superseding agencies: GUGB (1941); MGB (1946)
- Type: Intelligence agency Secret police
- Jurisdiction: Council of People's Commissars of the Soviet Union
- Headquarters: Lubyanka Building, 2 Bolshaya Lubyanka Street, Moscow, Soviet Union
- Agency executive: Vsevolod Merkulov

The People's Commissariat for State Security (Russian: Народный комиссариат государственной безопасности, romanized: Narodnyy komissariat gosudarstvennoy bezopasnosti) or NKGB, was the name of the Soviet secret police, intelligence and counter-intelligence force that existed from 3 February 1941 to 20 July 1941, and again from 14 April 1943 to 15 March 1946, before being renamed the Ministry for State Security (MGB).

== Separate administration ==
Changes in Soviet apparatus began in February 1941 with the Presidium of the Supreme Soviet decision. It started with Military Counterintelligence. On 3 February 1941, the 4th Department (Special Section, OO) of GUGB within the NKVD security service responsible for the Red Army military counter-intelligence, consisting of 12 Sections and one Investigation Unit, was separated from the GUGB NKVD. The official liquidation of the OO GUGB and GUGB as organized units within the NKVD was announced on 12 February 1941 by a joint order № 00151/003 of the NKVD and NKGB USSR.
The rest of the GUGB was abolished and staff were moved to the newly created People's Commissariat for State Security (NKGB). Departments of the former GUGB were renamed Directorates. For example, the former Foreign Department (INO) became the Foreign Directorate (INU); political police represented by the Secret Political Department (SPO) became the Secret Political Directorate (SPU), and so on.

== NKGB tasking ==
Based on NKVD and NKGB directive number 782/B265M, from 1 March 1941, the NKGB tasks were:

- Conducting intelligence activities abroad;
- Battling espionage (on both fronts: counter and offensive);
- Battling sabotage and terrorist acts organized by foreign Special Services on USSR territory;
- The penetration, and liquidation, of anti-Soviet parties and counter-revolutionary organizations;
- Overseeing ideology in Soviet society;
- The protection of high party and government officials.

== February 1941 organization ==
The first head of NKGB was Vsevolod Nikolayevich Merkulov who became People's Commissar of State Security. His first deputy was Ivan Serov, a former Commissar 3rd rank of State Security, and two deputies, Bogdan Kobulov and Mikhail Gribov.

People's Commissar of State Security; Vsevolod Merkulov
First Deputy: Ivan Serov	Deputy: Bogdan Kobulov
NKGB Office: V. Golovanov	Deputy: Mikhail Gribov
First Directorate (Foreign Intelligence – INU); Pavel Fitin	Department One (Government Protection); Nikolai Vlasik
Second Directorate (Counter-Intelligence – KRU); Pyotr Fedotov	Department Two (Statistics and Archives – USO); Leonid Bashtakov
Third Directorate (Secret Political – SPU); Solomon Milshtein	Department Three (Operative); Dmitry Shadrin
Investigative Service; Lev Vlodzimirskii	Department Four (Technical and Operational); Evgeny Lapishin
Directorate of Kremlin Commander; Nikolai Spyrydonov	Department Five (Codes and Ciphers)
Department of Staff; Mikhail Gribov
Department for Administration; Economy and Finance (AChFO)

== Changes 1941/1943 ==
The Soviet security organizations were merged in July 1941, after the German invasion, with the NKGB Directorates returned to NKVD as separate units. During 1943 changes NKGB was created again as separate Commissariat. Please look at organization changes below)

These organizational changes were never explained. According to historian John Dziak they may have had something to do with the Soviet occupations of Latvia, Lithuania, Estonia, eastern Poland, part of Romania (Bessarabia and northern Bukovina). Also, the numbers of apprehensions, deportations, executions and establishments of Gulags had quickly grown, which required a reorganization of structures and a boost of manpower in the security administration. Other reasons Dziak states are: the shock caused by the German aggression and the fast progress of their army; and when the Soviet victory in Stalingrad had made prospects of the recovery of previous war losses more likely.

== 1943 organization ==
People's Commissar of State Security and his deputies Vsevolod Merkulov
NKGB Office: Avram Kossoy
First Directorate (Foreign Intelligence – INU); Pavel Fitin	Sixth Directorate (Government Protection); Nikolai Vlasik
Second Directorate (Counter-Intelligence – KRU); Pyotr Fedotov	Directorate of Kremlin Commander; Nikolai Spyrydonov
Third Directorate (Transport); Solomon Milshtein	Investigative Service; Lev Vlodzimirsky
Fourth Directorate (Sabotage Behind Enemy Lines); Pavel Sudoplatov	Department for Administration; Economy and Finance (AChFO)
Fifth Department (Codes and Ciphers); Ivan Shevyelev	Department of Staff
Department A (Statistics and Archive); Arkady Gercovsky	Department B (Technical and Operational); Evgeny Lapishin	Department W (Censure)

== From commissariats to ministries ==
In 1946, other changes followed. Existing People's Commissariats were renamed "ministries." People's Commisariat for Internal Affairs (or NKVD) was renamed Ministry of Internal Affairs (Ministerstvo Vnutrennikh Del) or MVD, and the People's Commissariat for State Security was renamed Ministry of State Security (Ministerstvo Gosudarstvennoi Bezopasnosti) or MGB.

== See also ==
- Bibliography of Stalinism and the Soviet Union
- Chronology of Soviet secret police agencies
- Eastern Bloc politics
- Reich Security Main Office
