= Sergo Goglidze =

Georgian NKVD officer (1901–53)

Sergo Goglidze სერგო გოგლიძე
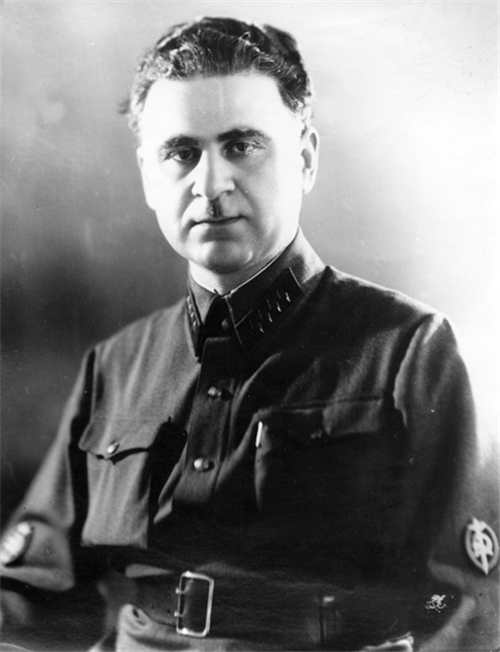

1st Deputy Minister of State Security
- In office August 26 – November 10, 1951
- In office November 20, 1952 – March 11, 1953

Deputy Minister of State Security
- In office 13 February – 20 November 1952

Minister of State Security of the Uzbek SSR
- In office 13 November 1951 – 15 February 1952
- Preceded by: Pavel Drozdetsky
- Succeeded by: Sergei Ogoltsov

People's Commissar/Minister of State Security of the Soviet Far East
- In office May 7, 1943 – January 3, 1951

People‘s Commissar for Internal Affairs of the Georgian SSR
- In office January 1, 1937 – November 14, 1938
- Preceded by: David Kiladze
- Succeeded by: Avksenti Rapava

People‘s Commissar for Internal Affairs of the Transcaucasian SFSR
- In office November 11, 1934 – January 1, 1937

Personal details
- Born: 1901 Kutaisi, Georgia, Russian Empire
- Died: 23 December 1953 (aged 51–52) Moscow, USSR
- Cause of death: Execution by shooting
- Awards: Order of Lenin (×2)

Military service
- Allegiance: Russian Empire (1917–1918); Russian Soviet Federative Socialist Republic (1918–1922); Soviet Union (1922–1953)
- Branch/service: Imperial Russian Army; Red Army; Cheka; GPU; OGPU; NKVD; MGB; MVD
- Years of service: 1917–1953
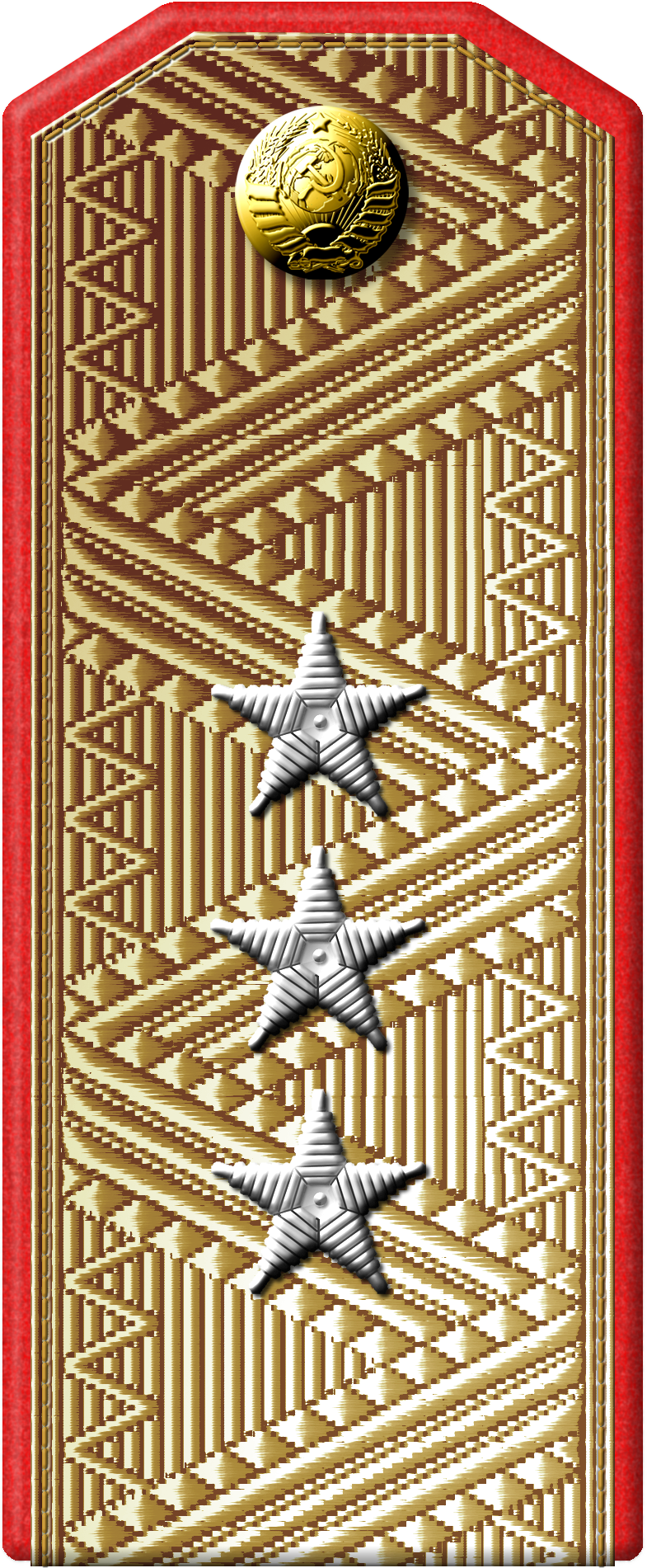
- Rank: Colonel general
- Unit: GPU-OGPU-NKVD border troops
- Battles/wars: Russian Civil War; World War II

Sergo Arseni Goglidze (Georgian: სერგო არსენის ძე გოგლიძე, Russian: Сергей (Серго) Арсеньевич Гоглидзе; 1901 – 23 December 1953) was a Soviet security officer, NKVD official and Colonel General of State Security.

== Biography ==
Born in Korta, a village near Kutaisi, Serghei (Sergo) Arsenievici (Arsentievici) Goglidze joined the Cheka in 1921. He served with GPU-OGPU-NKVD border troops, rising through the ranks. In 1934 he was appointed People's Commissar of Internal Affairs of the Transcaucasian SFSR, and, from 1937, of the Georgian SSR. Goglidze was a close associate and friend of Lavrentiy Beria, who promoted him to high-level positions.

In 1941, he was appointed Plenipotentiary of the People's Commissar's Council in Moldavia (Romanian territory, occupied by the Soviet Union following the ultimatum of June 26, 1940, itself a direct consequence of the Ribbentrop-Molotov pact), and was put in charge of a major deportation. In July 1941, after the start of the war, he was moved to Khabarovsk, working as a chief of the Soviet security apparatus in the Far East.

In 1951, he was moved to the headquarters of the MGB in Moscow, serving as a Deputy Minister of State Security. Goglidze was in charge of the investigation of the Doctors' Plot.

In 1953, after the death of Stalin and downfall of Beria, he was arrested and shot (in Moscow, on 23 December 1953) together with a group of other NKVD officers close to Beria.

== Notes and links ==
- Н. В. Петров, К. В. Скоркин: Гоглидзе, Сергей Арсеньевич. Кто руководил НКВД 1934–1941, Москва 1999. * http://www.hrono.ru/biograf/bio_g/goglidze_sa.php (rus.)
- http://www.knowbysight.info/GGG/02069.asp (rus.)
