= Military counterintelligence of the Soviet Army =

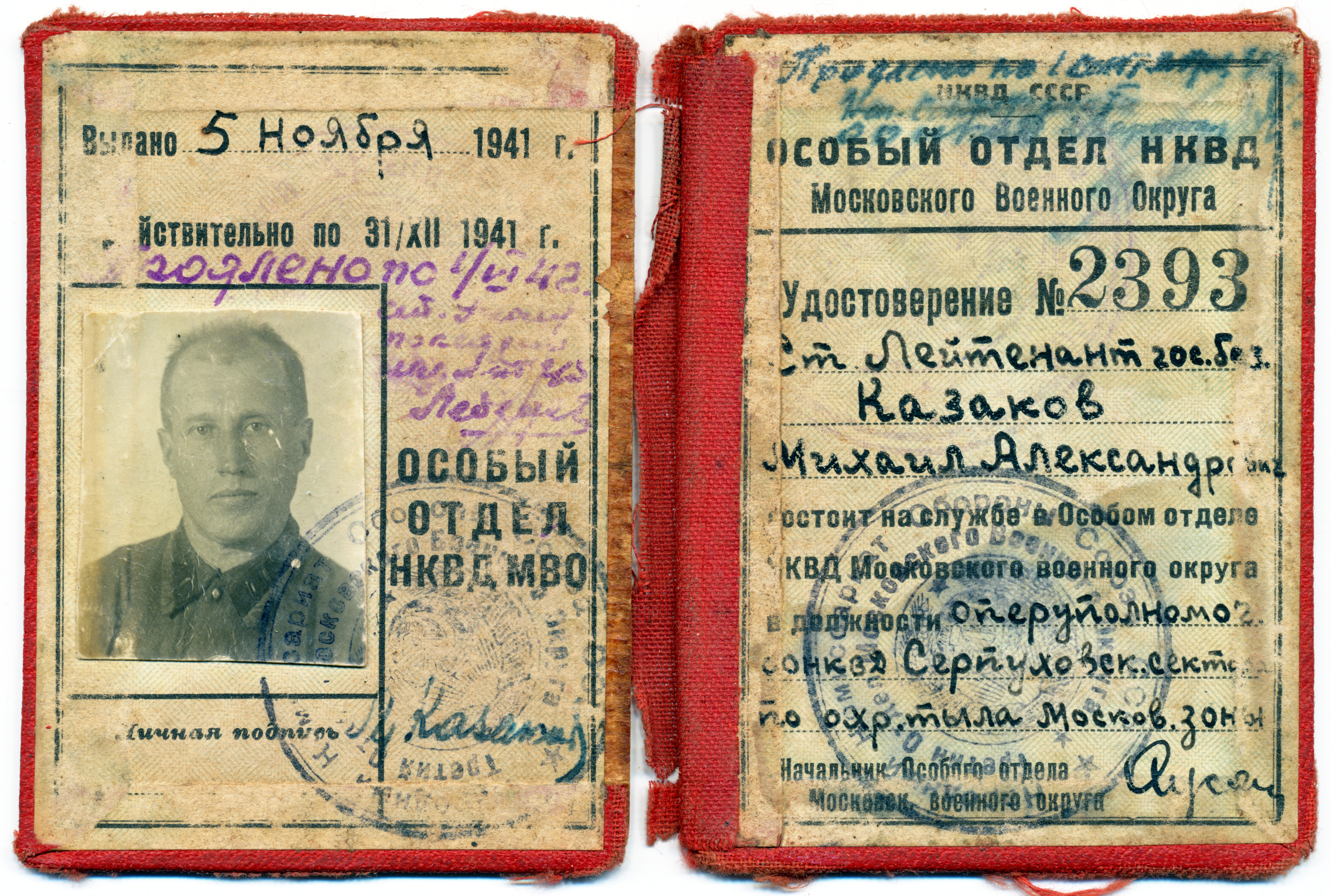
Special Department ID belonging to state security senior Lieutenant from the Moscow Military District

Military counterintelligence within the Soviet Armed Forces was controlled by the nonmilitary Soviet secret police throughout the history of the USSR (1922 to 1991).

Military counterintelligence departments of the Soviet Armed Forces existed in all larger military formations, usually called a Special Department (Russian: Особый отдел (ОсО), romanized: Osoby otdel, POPsO) or third department/section. The members of the Special Department were colloquially called osobists.

TGU (ТГУ КГБ СССР, 3 ГУ КГБ СССР ('third')) functionaries were responsible for protection of the military units and of important servicemen (e.g. commanding officers) against activities of foreign military attaché offices/diplomats.

== Timeline ==
- Initially there was no common counterintelligence directorate. Various armies and fronts had their "Special Departments".
- Cheka, ВЧК, founded on 20 December 1917
- Military Department of Cheka, Военный отдел ВЧК, established on 27 July 1918
- Special Department of Cheka, Особый отдел ВЧК, established on 19 December 1918
- Special Department of Secret Operative Directorate of GPU NKVD RSFSR, Особый отдел СОУ (Секретно-оперативное управление) ГПУ, July 1922
- Special Department of OGPU, Особый отдел ОГПУ, September 1930
- 4th Division of the OGPU Special Department, 4 отделение Особого отдела ОГПУ
- Special Department of the GUGB NKVD USSR, Особый отдел ГУГБ НКВД СССР (July 1934 –)
- 5th (Special) Dept. of GUGB, 5-й (особый) отдел ГУГБ December 1936 –
- 2nd Directorate of NKVD (Special Departments), 2-е Управление (особых отделов) НКВД СССР June 1938 –
- 4th (Special) Dept. of GUGB, 4-й (особый) отдел ГУГБ September 1938 – February 1941
- 3rd Directorate of People's Commissariat of Defense,(UKR НКО) Третье Управление НКО February 1941 – July 1941
- 3rd Directorate of People's Commissariat of the Navy (UKR NKВМФ), Третье Управление НКВМФ February 1941 – January 1942
- 3rd Dept. of NKVD, (OKR NKVD) Третий отдел НКВД February 1941 – July 1941
- Directorate of Special Departments of NKVD, (УОО НКВД) Управление особых отделов НКВД СССР July 1941 – April 1943
- SMERSH (ГУРК НКО) 1943–1946
- Third Chief Directorate of MGB of the USSR, Третье Главное Управление МГБ СССР, May 1946 – 1953
- Third Directorate of Ministry of Internal Affairs, Третье управление МВД СССР, March 1953 – 1954
- Third Chief Directorate of KGB by the Council of Ministers of the USSR, Третье главное управление КГБ при СМ СССР, March 1954 – 1960
- Third Directorate of KGB of the Council of Ministers of the USSR, Третье управление КГБ при СМ СССР, 1960–1978
- Third Directorate of KGB of the USSR, Третье управление КГБ СССР, 1978–1982
- Third Chief Directorate of KGB of the USSR, Третье главное управление КГБ СССР, 1982–1991

== Notes ==
- Artemiev, Vyacheslav P. OKR: State Security in the Soviet Armed Forces Military Review, Vol. 43, No. 9, September 1963.
