= Vsevolod Merkulov =

Soviet politician and intelligence officer (1895–1953)

- Всеволод Меркулов
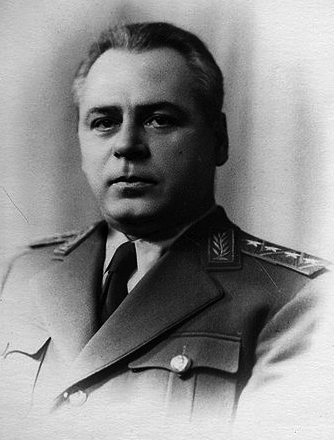
- Merkulov in 1945

Minister of State Control
- In office 27 October 1950 – 22 May 1953
- Premier: Joseph Stalin; Georgy Malenkov
- Preceded by: Lev Mekhlis
- Succeeded by: Alexander Paveliev

Minister of State Security
- In office 15 March 1946 – 4 May 1946
- Premier: Joseph Stalin
- Preceded by: Himself (as People's Commissar of State Security)
- Succeeded by: Viktor Abakumov

People's Commissar for State Security
- In office 14 April 1943 – 15 March 1946
- Preceded by: Himself (as Director of the Main Directorate of State Security)
- Succeeded by: Office abolished
- In office 3 February 1941 – 20 July 1941
- Preceded by: Himself (as Director of the Main Directorate of State Security)
- Succeeded by: Office abolished

First Deputy People's Commissar for Internal Affairs and Director of the Main Directorate of State Security
- In office 20 July 1941 – 14 April 1943
- Preceded by: Himself (as People's Commissar of State Security)
- Succeeded by: Office abolished
- In office 17 December 1938 – 3 February 1941
- Preceded by: Lavrentiy Beria
- Succeeded by: Office abolished

Personal details
- Born: 27 November 1895 Zagatala, Tiflis Governorate, Russian Empire
- Died: 23 December 1953 (aged 58) Moscow, Russian SFSR, Soviet Union
- Cause of death: Execution by shooting
- Citizenship: Soviet
- Party: Communist Party of the Soviet Union (1925–1953)
- Education: Saint Petersburg State University

Military service
- Allegiance: Russian Empire (1916–1918); Russian Soviet Federative Socialist Republic (1921–1922); Soviet Union (1922–1953)
- Branch/service: Imperial Russian Army; Cheka; GPU; OGPU; GUGB; NKVD; NKGB; MGB; MVD
- Years of service: 1916–1918; 1921–1953
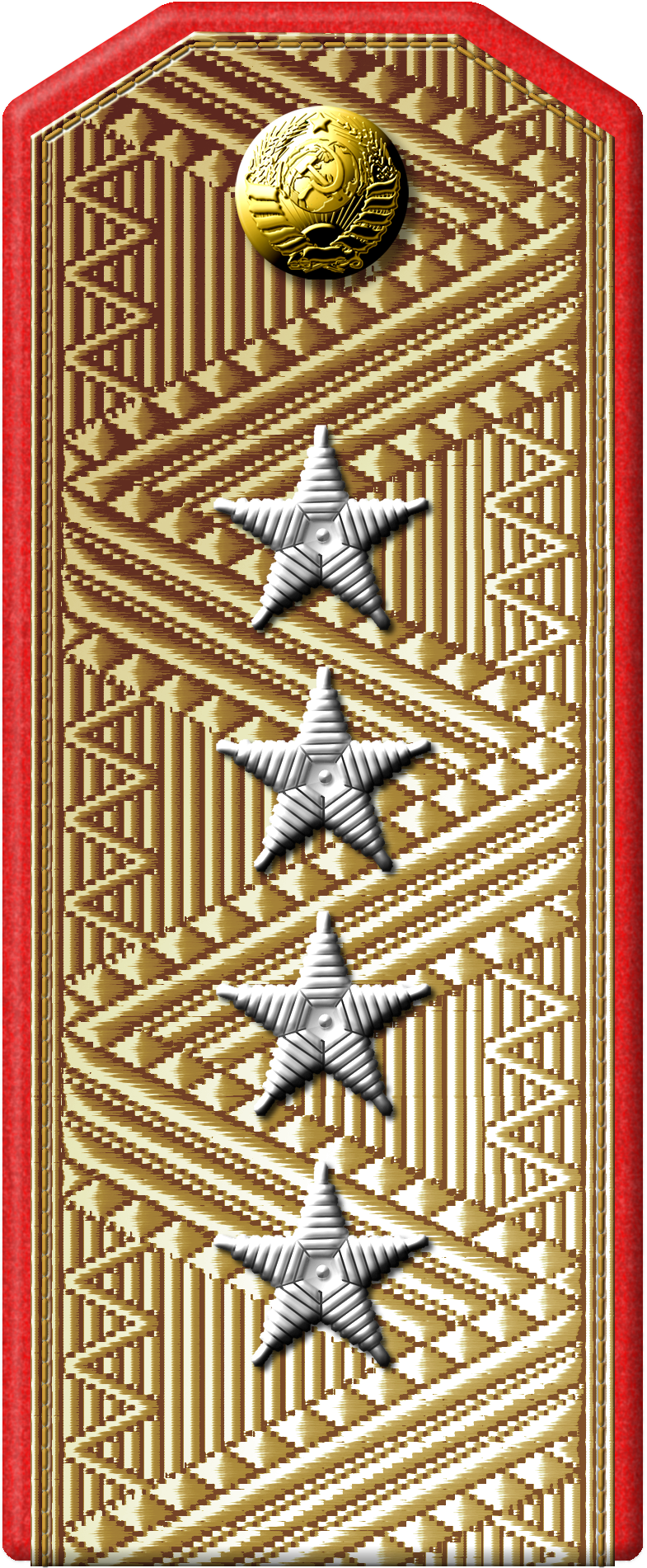
- Rank: Army general
- Battles/wars: World War II; Anti-communist insurgencies in Central and Eastern Europe; Baltic Insurgency; Ukraine Insurgency

Vsevolod Nikolayevich Merkulov (Russian: Всеволод Николаевич Меркулов; 27 November [O.S. 15 November] 1895 – 23 December 1953) was the head of NKGB from February to July 1941, and again from April 1943 to March 1946. He was a leading member of what was later derisively described as the "Beria gang".

== Early life ==
Merkulov was born in 1895 in Zagatala in present-day Azerbaijan. His Russian father and Georgian mother were both minor members of the nobility. His father, an army captain, was convicted of embezzlement around the year 1900, and died in 1908. In 1913, Vsevolod Merkulov graduated from the Tiflis Gymnasium with a gold medal and became a student at Saint Petersburg University, Department of Physics and Mathematics, but did not graduate. In 1916, he was drafted into the Russian Army. In 1918, he left the army and moved to Tiflis (Tbilisi), where for a time he was unemployed, then worked as a teacher. From September 1921, after the Soviet invasion of Georgia, he was enlisted in Cheka, and its successor, the GPU.

Merkulov first met Lavrentiy Beria in 1923, when Beria was 24 and had been made deputy chairman of the Georgian GPU. He owed his subsequent promotions to Beria's patronage. He joined the Communist Party in 1925. From 1925 to 1931, he was Head of Secret Operations Directorate and Deputy Head of the GPU of Adzharistan. In 1931, he was made head of the Secret Political Department of the Transcaucasian GPU, but soon afterwards transferred to party work, when Beria was First Secretary of the Transcaucasian communist party. He wrote a pamphlet about Beria, entitled The Faithful Son of the Leninist–Stalinist Party. He was head of the Industry and Transport section of the Georgian CP Central Committee in 1936–38.

== Transfer to Moscow ==
Merkulov was transferred to Moscow in August 1938, shortly after Beria had been chosen by Stalin to take over control of the NKVD from Nikolai Yezhov. When Beria took over as head of the Main Directorate of State Security (GUGB) on 29 September 1938, he chose Merkulov as his deputy. In 1939, he was elected a member of the Central Committee of the Communist Party of the Soviet Union

Merkulov interrogated Yefim Yevdokimov, an associate of Yezhov who had been under arrest for five months but had refused to cooperate. On 13 April 1939, Yevdokimov broke down and 'confessed' to being part of the 'Yezhov conspiracy'. At his trial, he said that he had confessed because he could not stand the pain of being beaten on his heels.

In February 1941, the NKVD was divided in two, and Merkulov was appointed Chairman of the NKGB. On 21 July 1941, his department was merged again with the NKVD, with Merkulov was Deputy People's Commissar, under Beria. On 20 July 1943, two departments were separated again, and Merkulov was again head of the NKGB.

== War time ==
In September 1939, following the pact between the USSR and Nazi Germany, Merkulov was sent to Ukraine to supervise the incorporation of territory seized from Poland. On 28 September, he reported to Beria that 1,923 people had been arrested, most of whom were accused of being Ukrainian nationalists. When almost 22,000 Polish officers were executed in the famous Katyn massacre in spring 1940, Merkulov headed the 'troika' who signed off the death sentences. Before it began, he visited the Belorussian Soviet Socialist Republic on 5 March, to check on progress in rounding up Poles trapped in the western part of the republic recently seized from Poland.

In May 1941, Merkulov was in charge of the pacification of the Baltic states, which were being forcibly incorporated in the USSR. On 17 June, he sent a reporting saying that he had had 14,467 people arrested in the three republics, and another 25,711 (mostly families of those arrested) evicted from their homes. It was calculated that in the short period before the German invasion, four percent of Estonia's population, and 2 per cent of the populations of Latvia and Lithuania were deported.

=== The German invasion ===
In his role as head of foreign intelligence, Merkulov travelled with Molotov to Berlin in November 1940, to have breakfast with Hitler. He received warnings from well-placed agents that the Germans were planning to invade, but refused to believe them, telling one of his agents: "You are greatly exaggerating." On 25 May 1941, he informed Stalin that Germany had 160–200 divisions concentrated on the Soviet border, but added that war was "unlikely" because "Hitler cannot risk war with the USSR for fear of violating the unity of the Nazi Party."

After the German invasion, Merkulov was in charge of purging the Red Army of officers suspected of disloyalty, including Grigory Shtern who was hit with an electric cable that ripped out his right eye, in Merkulov's office. Merkulov made the officer who struck the blow, Lev Shvartzman apologise – for causing blood to spill on the carpet. He also beat the arrested Red Army officers Kirill Meretskov and Boris Vannikov with a rubber truncheon, though when charged with this offence 12 years later, he claimed that the beatings did not amount to 'torture'. On Stalin's orders, he also kidnapped and killed the wife of Marshal Kulik.

=== Espionage ===
He was involved with a plan to build up a network of spies inside the Manhattan Project. The NKVD's first success was the recruitment of Klaus Fuchs. The project was given the codename "Enormoz". In November 1944, Pavel Fitin reported:

Despite participation by a large number of scientific organization and workers on the problem of Enormoz in the U.S., mainly known to us by agent data, their cultivation develops poorly. Therefore, the major part of data on the U.S. comes from the station in England. On the basis of information from London station, Moscow Center more than once sent to the New York station a work orientation and sent a ready agent, too [Klaus Fuchs].

Another important source was John Cairncross. Fitin reported to Merkulov:

Valuable information on Enormoz is coming from the London station. The first materials on Enormoz were received in late 1941 from our source List [John Cairncross], containing valuable and absolutely secret documents both on the substance of the Enormoz problem and on measures by the British government to organize and develop work on the problem of atomic energy in our country. In connection with American and Canadian work on Enormoz, materials describing the state and progress of work in three countries—England, the U.S., and Canada—are all coming from the London station.

During the war, Merkulov wrote a patriotic play Engineer Sergeyev, using the pseudonym Vsevolod Rokk.

== Post war ==
The author Nikolai Tolstoy, in his Victims of Yalta (1977), recounts Merkulov speaking to the imprisoned Cossack general Pyotr Krasnov in the Lubyanka in 1945. (The report is the testimony of the general's son, Nikolai Krasnov, who was also present and later released from the Gulag under Nikita Khrushchev's 1955 amnesty.)

Sooner or later there will be a clash between the Communist Bear and the Western Bulldog. There will be no mercy for our sugar-coated, honey-dripping, wheedling, grovelling allies! We'll blow them to blazes with all their kings, with all their traditions, lords, castles, heralds, Orders of the Bath and Garter, and their white wigs. When the Bear's paw strikes, no-one will remain to nurse the hope that their gold can rule the world. Our healthy, socially strong young idea, the idea of Lenin and Stalin, will be the victor! ... When we roar they sit tight on their tails! I am told that there were Tsars who watered their horses in the Oder. Well, the time will come when we will water Soviet horses in the Thames!

== Dismissal, arrest and execution ==
On 4 May 1946, Merkulov was removed from his post as head of what was now the renamed Ministry of State Security. This was a setback for Beria, who lost control of the police apparatus to a younger rival, Viktor Abakumov, while Merkulov was unemployed for over a year. On 25 April 1947, he was appointed head of the main directorate for Soviet property abroad. On 27 October 1950, he was appointed Minister of State Control, replacing Lev Mekhlis.

In July 1953, after Beria was arrested, Merkulov was summoned by Nikita Khrushchev, the new head of the communist party, and ordered to write a report on his links with Beria. He wrote a long letter denouncing Beria as an ambitious schemer, but claiming that despite having known him for 30 years, Merkulov had only now realised that he was a criminal. Khrushchev wrote later: "I admit that I held him in high regard and considered him a good party member. He was unquestionably a cultured person" – but considered his report to be "absolutely worthless. It was more like a piece of fiction ... To my deep regret, since I had trusted him, Merkulov turned out to be deeply implicated in some of Beria's crimes."

Merkulov was tried in secret, with Beria and six others, in December 1953. Pravda reported on 14 December that he had been found guilty of "many years of joint criminal activity" with Beria, "fulfilling many of Beria's criminal missions", treason, terrorism, and "participating in a counter-revolutionary, treacherous, conspiratorial group", for which he was sentenced to death, and shot.
