= Main Directorate of State Security =

Soviet national security agency (1934–1943)

- Главное управление государственной безопасности

Agency overview
- Formed: 10 July 1934; 92 years ago 20 July 1941; 85 years ago
- Preceding agencies: Cheka (1917–1922); GPU (1922–1923); OGPU (1923–1934)
- Dissolved: 3 February 1941; 85 years ago 14 April 1943; 83 years ago
- Superseding agency: NKGB (1941)/(1943–1946)
- Type: Intelligence agency Secret police
- Jurisdiction: Council of People's Commissars of the Soviet Union
- Headquarters: Lubyanka Building, 2 Bolshaya Lubyanka Street, Moscow, Soviet Union
- Agency executives: Genrikh Yagoda (1934–1936); Yakov Agranov (1936–1937); Mikhail Frinovsky (1937–1938); Lavrentiy Beria (1938); Vsevolod Merkulov (1938–1941)/(1941–1943)
- Parent agency: People's Commissariat for Internal Affairs

The Main Directorate of State Security (Russian: Glavnoe upravlenie gosudarstvennoy bezopasnosti, Главное управление государственной безопасности, ГУГБ, GUGB) was the name of the Soviet Union's most important security body within the People's Commissariat of Internal Affairs (NKVD) USSR. At the time of its existence, which was from July 10, 1934 to February 3, 1941, the GUGB reflected exactly the Secret Operational Directorate within OGPU under the Council of People's Commissars, which operated within OGPU structure from 1923 to 1931/32. An intelligence service and secret police from July 1934 to February 1941, it was run under the auspices of the Peoples Commissariat of Internal Affairs (NKVD). Its first head was first deputy of People's Commissar of Internal Affairs (then Genrikh Yagoda), Commissioner 1st rank of State Security Yakov Agranov.

== History ==
The Main Directorate of State Security evolved from the Joint State Political Directorate (or OGPU). On February 3, 1941, the Special Sections (00) of the GUGB-NKVD (responsible for counter-intelligence in the military) became part of the Army and Navy (RKKA and RKKF, respectively). The GUGB was disbanded as an organization within NKVD USSR. The units that operated in GUGB were reorganized and made the core of the newly made People's Commissariat of State Security or NKGB.

Following the outbreak of World War II, the NKVD and NKGB were reunited, not as GUGB but as totally separate directorates. On July 20, 1941, Army and Airforce counter-intelligence was returned to the NKVD as Directorate of Special Departments under Viktor Abakumov; in January 1942, Navy CI followed. In April 1943, it was again transferred to the Narkomat of Defence and Narkomat of the Navy, becoming SMERSH (from Smert' Shpionam or "Death to Spies"); at the same time, the GUGB was again separated from the NKVD as NKGB.

== GUGB heads ==
- Genrikh Yagoda 10 July 1934 - 26 September 1936
- Yakov Agranov 29 December 1936 - 15 April 1937
- Mikhail Frinovsky 15 April 1937 - 28 March 1938
- Lavrentiy Beria 29 September 1938 - 17 December 1938
- Vsevolod Merkulov 17 December 1938 - 3 February 1941
- Vsevolod Merkulov 20 July 1941 - 14 April 1943

== Organization ==
Between 1934 and 1941, the Main Directorate of State Security went through several organizational changes. In January 1935, there were nine departments in the GUGB structure:

(head of GUGB) – Commissioner 1st rank of State Security Yakov Agranov

1. Operational Department (headed by) – Karl Pauker
2. Special Department – Gleb Bokii
3. Department of Economics – (ЭКО/EKO) – Lev Mironov
4. Special Department – (OO) – Mark Gai
5. Secret Political Department – (СПО/SPO) – Georgy Molchanov
6. Foreign Department – (ИНО/INO) – Artur Artuzov
7. Department of Transport – (ТО) – Vladimir Kichkin
8. Department of Information and Statistic – (УСО/USO) – Yakov Genkin
9. Staff Department – (OK) – Yakov Weynschtok

By the end of 1937 the People's Commissar of Internal Affairs Nikolai Yezhov, in his order #00362 had changed the number of departments from five to twelve.

(head of GUGB) – komkor Mikhail Frinovsky

- Department 1 [Protection of Government] – Israel Dagin
- Department 2 [Operative] – Ans Zalpeter
- Department 3 [counter-intelligence] (КРО/KRO) – Aleksandr Minayev-Cikanovich
- Department 4 [Secret Political] (СПО/SPO) – Mikhail Litvin
- Department 5 [Special] (OO) – Nikolai Nikolaev-Zhuryd
- Department 6 [Transport] (TO) – Mikhail Volkov
- Department 7 [Foreign (Intelligence)] (ИНО/INO) – Abram Slutsky
- Department 8 [Records and Statistic] (УСО/USO) – Vladimir Cesarsky
- Department 9 [Special (codes)] (OO) – Isaak Shapiro
- Department 10 [Prison] – Yakov Weynschtok
- Department 11 [Maritime Transportation] (ВО/WO) – Victor Yrcev
- Department 12 [Technical and Operational] (OOT) – Semyen Zhukovsky

After Lavrenty Beria took over Frinovsky place as a GUGB head, on 29 September 1938, GUGB underwent another organizational change -

(head of GUGB) – Commissioner 1st rank of State Security Lavrenty Beria

- Department 1 – [Protection of Government] – Israel Dagin
- Department 2 – [Secret Political] (Russian: Секретно-политический отдел, romanized: Sekretno-politicheskij otdel) – Bogdan Kobulov
- Department 3 – [counter-intelligence] – Nikolai Nikolaev-Zhuryd
- Department 4 – [Special] — Pyotr Fedotov
- Department 5 – [Foreign (Intelligence)] – Zelman Passov
- Department 6 – [Codes] – Alexander Balamutov
- GUGB Investigating Section

(head of GUGB) – Commissioner 3rd rank of State Security Vsevolod Merkulov

- Department 1 – [Protection of Party and Soviet officials]
  - included Political department, 24 office divisions, a school, commandant's offices of the CC VKP(b) and NKVD of USSR
- Department 2 – [Secret Political] –
  - Division 1 [Trotskyists, Zinovievists, leftists, rightists, miasnikovtsi, shlyapnikovtsi, banned from the party, foreign missions]
  - Division 2 [Mensheviks, anarchists, members of the Socialist Revolutionary Party, Bundists, Zionists, clerics, provocateurs, gendarmes, counterintelligence agents, punishers, White Cossacks, monarchists]
  - Division 3 [combating Ukrainian, Belarusian, and Ugro-Finnish national c-i]
  - Division 4 [agent studies on a/s political parties, dashnaks, Turkic-Tatar-Mongolian national c-i, gruzmeks, mussavatists, nationalists]
  - Division 5 [literati, press, publishing, theatres, cinema, art]
  - Division 6 [academies of sciences, science and research institutes, scientific societies]
  - Division 7 [discovery and study of c-i formations among studying youth, system of the People's Commissariat of Enlightenment and children of repressed]
  - Division 8 [People's Commissariat of Healthcare of USSR and RSFSR and its education institutions]
  - Division 9 [People's Commissariat of Justice, Supreme Court, Prosecutor's Office, People's Commissariat of Social Security and their educational institutions]
  - Division 10 [combating church and sect c-i]
  - Division 11 [physical culture organizations, volunteer societies, clubs, sports publishers]
  - Division 12 [Special council, militsiya, fire guard, military commissariats, leadership of the reserves]
- Department 3 – [counter-intelligence]
  - Division 1 [Germany, Hungary]
  - Division 2 [Japan, China]
  - Division 3 [Great Britain]
  - Division 4 [France, Italy, Belgium, Switzerland, Spain]
  - Division 5 [Romania, Greece, Bulgaria, Yugoslavia]
  - Division 6 [Poland]
  - Division 7 [Finland, Sweden, Norway, Denmark]
  - Division 8 [United States and countries of South America]
  - Division 9 [Turkey, Iran, Afghanistan]
  - Division 10 [ White movement c-i elements]
  - Division 11 [Latvia, Estonia, Lithuania]
  - Division 12 [People's Commissariat of Foreign Affairs, embassies and consulates]
  - Division 13 ECCI, MOPR]
  - Division 14 Foreign Trade, trade offices]
  - Division 15 Intourist and VOKS]
  - Diplomat security section
  - Diplomat security political department
  - Divisions 16, 17, 18, 19 Diplomat security
- Department 4 – [Special] —
  - Division 1 [headquarters]
  - Division 2 [intelligence directorates]
  - Division 3 [aviation]
  - Division 4 [technical troops]
  - Division 5 [motorized detachments]
  - Division 6 [artillery, cavalry and artillery detachments]
  - Division 7 [infantry, cavalry and artillery detachments]
  - Division 8 politruk
  - Division 9 [medical service]
  - Division 10 [Navy]
  - Division 11 [NKVD troops]
  - Division 12 [organizational and mobilizing]
  - investigative section
- Department 5 – [Foreign (Intelligence)]
  - Division 1 [Germany, Hungary, Denmark]
  - Division 2 [Poland]
  - Division 3 [France, Belgium, Switzerland, Netherlands]
  - Division 4 [Great Britain]
  - Division 5 [Italy]
  - Division 6 [Spain]
  - Division 7 [Romania, Bulgaria, Yugoslavia, Greece]
  - Division 8 [Finland, Sweden, Norway, Spitzbergen]
  - Division 9 [Latvia, Estonia, Lithuania]
  - Division 10 [United States, Canada, South America, Mexico]
  - Division 11 [Japan, Manchuria]
  - Division 12 [China, Xinjiang]
  - Division 12 [Mongolia, Tuva]
  - Division 12 [Turkey, Iran, Afghanistan]
  - Division 12 [technical intelligence]
  - Division 12 [operational equipment]
  - Division 12 [visas]
- Department 6 – [Ciphering, safeguard of state secrecy]
  - Division 1, 2, 3 [safeguard of state secrecy, verification and recordkeeping of those admitted to secret work and documents]
  - Division 4 [deciphering]
  - Division 5 [research, development and recordkeeping of ciphers, drafting NKVD ciphers, preparation of ciphering specialists]
  - Division 6 [NKVD encrypting process]
  - Division 7 [organizational management of peripherals, development of instructions and regulations on secret ciphering and agent missions]
  - Division 8 [ciphering]
- GUGB Investigating Section —

=== GUGB Ranks ===
The GUGB had a unique system of ranks, a blend of the position-rank system used in the Red Army and personal ranks used in the Militsiya; the rank insignia was also very distinct. Even though insignia introduced in 1937 followed the Red Army collar patch patterns, it assigned them to very different ranks for GUGB and Internal Troops/political/specialist branches, with GUGB rank placed at least one grade higher than a similar army equivalent.

When GUGB and Militsiya ranks were replaced with military ranks and insignia in February 1943, Major to Sergeant ranks were aligned with Colonel to Junior Lieutenant, and Senior Major and up were replaced with various degrees of Commissioner. In 1945, General Commissioner Lavrentiy Beria received the rank of the Marshal of the Soviet Union, and other GUGB Commissioners received ranks from Major general to Army General.

Ranks of GUGB 1935–1943

- генеральный комиссар ГБ – Commissioner General of State Security
- комиссар ГБ 1-го ранга – Commissioner 1st rank of State Security
- комиссар ГБ 2-го ранга – Commissioner 2nd rank of State Security
- комиссар ГБ 3-го ранга – Commissioner 3rd rank of State Security
- старший майор ГБ – Senior Major of State Security
- майор ГБ – Major of State Security
- капитан ГБ – Captain of State Security
- старший лейтенант ГБ – Senior Lieutenant of State Security
- лейтенант ГБ – Lieutenant of State Security
- младший лейтенант ГБ – Junior Lieutenant of State Security
- сержант ГБ – Sergeant of State Security

Rank insignia 1935-1937

Commissioner General of State Security

Commissioner of State Security 1st Rank

Commissioner of State Security 2nd Rank

Commissioner of State Security 3rd Rank

Senior Major of State Security

Major of State Security

Captain of State Security

Senior Lieutenant of State Security

Lieutenant of State Security

Junior Lieutenant of State Security

Sergeant of State Security

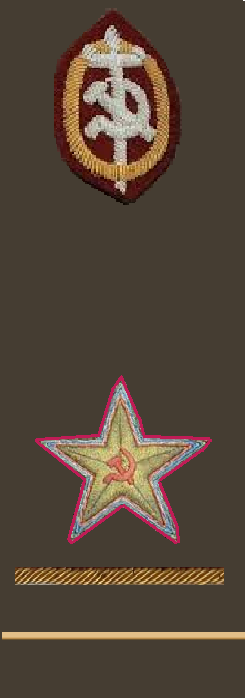

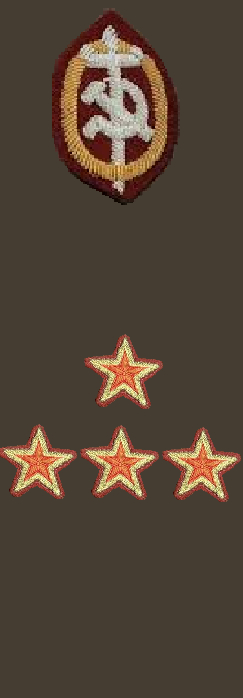

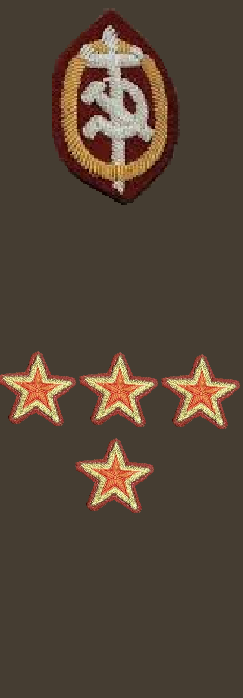

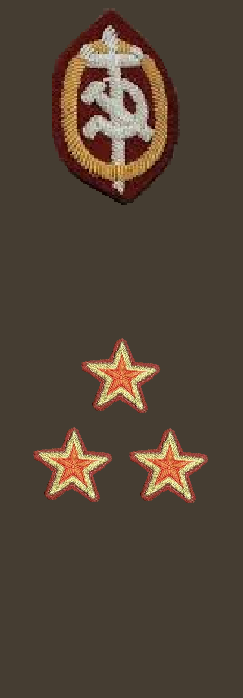

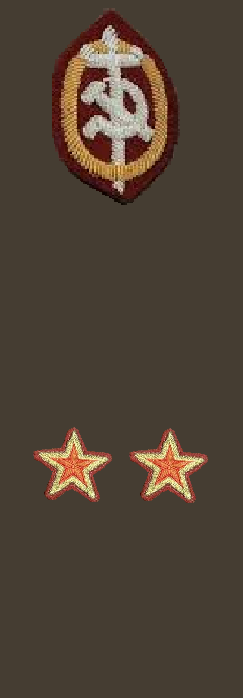

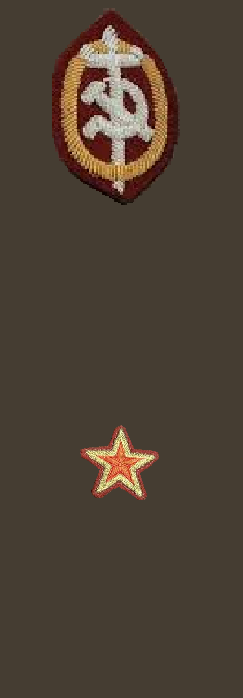

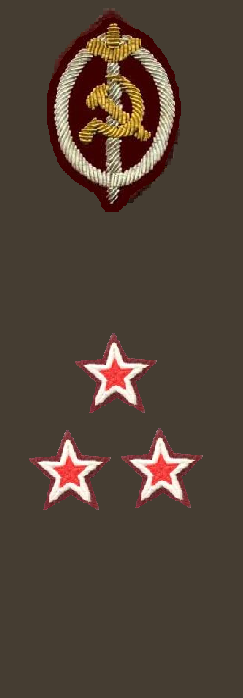

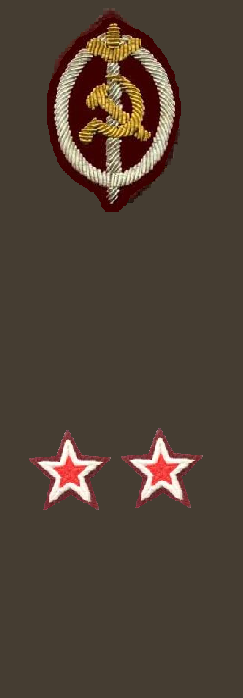

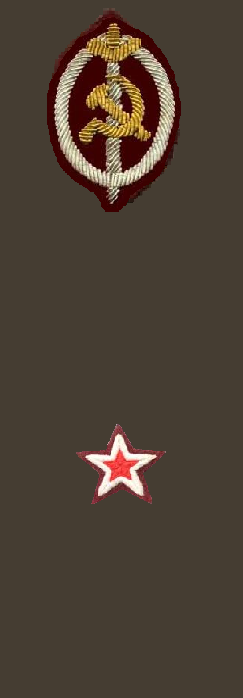

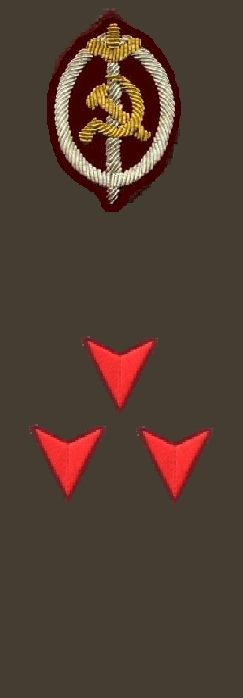

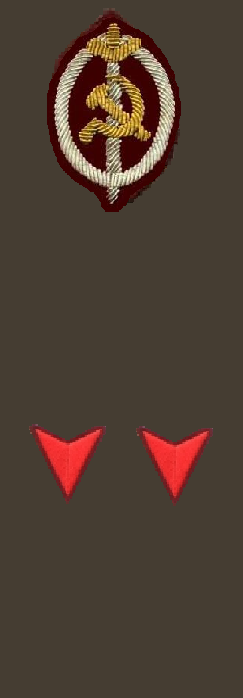

Rank insignia 1937-1943

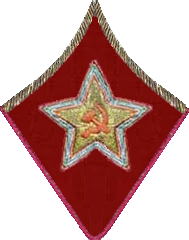
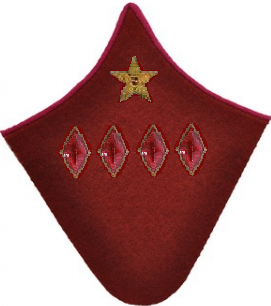
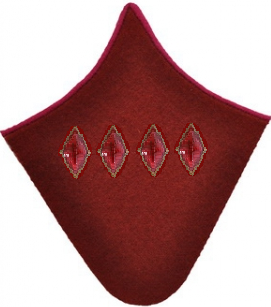
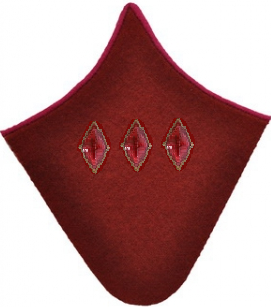
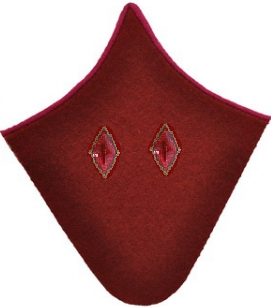
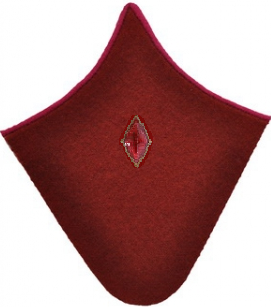
Commissioner General of State Security	Commissioner of State Security 1st Rank	Commissioner of State Security 2nd Rank	Commissioner of State Security 3rd Rank	Senior Major of State Security	Major of State Security

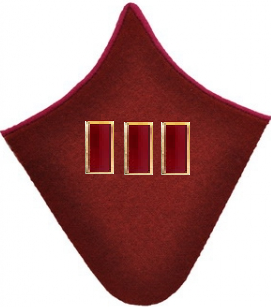
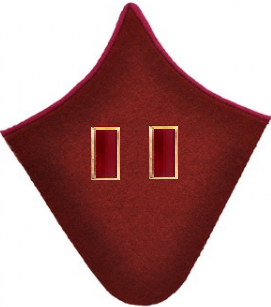
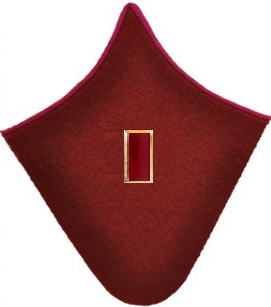
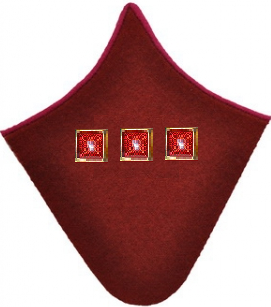
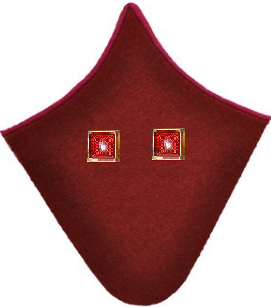
Captain of State Security	Senior Lieutenant of State Security	Lieutenant of State Security	Junior Lieutenant of State Security	Sergeant of State Security

== See also ==
- Bibliography of Stalinism and the Soviet Union § Terror, famine and the Gulag
- Chronology of Soviet secret police agencies
- Eastern Bloc politics
