= Solomon Milshtein =

NKVD officer (1899–1955)

Solomon Rafailovich Milshtein (Russian: Соломон Рафаилович Мильштейн; 1899 – 14 January 1955) was a Soviet state security official.

Solomon Milshtein was born to a family of a Jewish roofer in Vilno, then in the Russian Empire.

== Career ==
In 1920–1930, as a Bolshevik party apparatchik he worked in Georgia, where he became acquainted with Lavrentiy Beria, then head of the Georgian Communist Party . After Beria became head of NKVD in November 1938, Milshtein in December that year was appointed chief of the Investigative unit of NKVD.

He was arrested in July 1953, shortly after the arrest of Beria. He was tried and executed in January 1955.
