= Ministry of State Security (Soviet Union) =

Soviet Security Agency (1946–1953)

- Министерство государственной безопасности

Agency overview
- Formed: 15 March 1946; 80 years ago
- Preceding agencies: Cheka (1917–1922); GPU (1922–1923); OGPU (1923–1934); NKVD (1934–1943); GUGB (1934–1941)/(1941–1943); NKGB (February–July 1941/1943–1946)
- Dissolved: 5 March 1953; 73 years ago
- Superseding agencies: MVD (1953–1954); KGB (1954)
- Type: Secret police Intelligence agency
- Jurisdiction: Central Committee and Council of Ministers (1946–1953)
- Headquarters: Lubyanka Building, 2 Bolshaya Lubyanka Street, Moscow, Soviet Union
- Agency executives: Vsevolod Merkulov (1946); Viktor Abakumov (1946 – 1951); Sergei Ogoltsov (1951 – 1951) (acting); Semyon Ignatiev (1951 – 1953)

The Ministry of State Security (Russian: Министерство государственной безопасности, Russian pronunciation: [mʲɪnʲɪˈsʲtʲerstvə ɡəsʊˈdarstvʲɪn(ː)əj bʲɪzɐˈpasnəsʲtʲɪ]), abbreviated as MGB (Russian: МГБ), was a ministry of the Soviet Union from 1946 to 1953 which functioned as the country's secret police. The ministry inherited the intelligence and state security responsibilities of the People's Commissariat for Internal Affairs (NKVD) and People's Commissariat for State Security (NKGB). The MGB was led by Vsevolod Merkulov for 50 days from March 15 to May 4 1946, then by Viktor Abakumov from May 4 1946 to July 14 1951, then by Semyon Ignatiev until Stalin's death in March 5 1953, upon which it was merged into an enlarged Ministry of Internal Affairs (MVD).

== Origins of the MGB ==
The MGB was just one of many incarnations of the Soviet State Security apparatus. After the revolution, the Bolsheviks relied on a strong political police or security force to support and control their regime. During the Russian Civil War, the Cheka were in power, relinquishing it to State Political Directorate (GPU) in 1922 after the fighting was over.

The GPU was then renamed The People's Commissariat for Internal Affairs (NKVD) in 1934. From the mid-1930s and until the creation of the KGB, this "Organ of State Security" was re-organized and renamed multiple times. In 1941, the state-security function was separated from the NKVD and became the People's Commissariat for State Security (NKGB), only to be reintegrated a few months later during the Axis invasion of the Soviet Union.

In 1943, the NKGB was once again made into an independent organization in response to the Soviet occupation of parts of Eastern Europe. SMERSH—anecdotally derived from a phrase translated as "Death to Spies"—was designed to be a counter-intelligence unit within the Red Army to ensure the loyalty of the army personnel.

Following the end of the war, both the NKVD and the NKGB were converted to ministries and redubbed the Ministry of Internal Affairs (MVD) and the Ministry for State Security (MGB). The MGB and MVD merged again in 1953, orchestrated by Lavrentiy Beria, who was then arrested and executed. The KGB took on the mantle of the NKGB/MGB and, in 1954, broke off from the reformed MVD.

== Functions of the MGB ==
The MGB essentially inherited the "secret police" function of the old NKVD, conducting espionage and counterespionage, as well as enacting a policy of supervision and surveillance to keep control and to prevent disloyalty. After World War II, the MGB was used to bring the newly acquired Eastern Bloc under Soviet control. It enforced rigid conformity in the satellite states of Eastern Europe and infiltrated and destroyed anticommunist, anti-Soviet, or independent groups.

The protection, policing, and supervision of the Soviet Union fell to this new agency, as it was the main agency responsible for the security of the Union. The MGB directed espionage networks at home and abroad, and also organized both domestic and foreign counterintelligence. They were also responsible for enforcing security regulations, monitoring and censoring information leaving or coming into the country; and supervising the vast majority of Soviet life, including the planting and organizing of agents to track and monitor public opinion and loyalty; as well as ensuring the safety of important government and party officials.

The MGB, above all else, was a security organization, and as such, was designed for covert and clandestine surveillance and supervision. The intelligence apparatus was able to permeate every level and branch of state administration, with agents planted in collective farms, factories, and local governments, as well as throughout the upper level and rank and file of Soviet bureaucracy. Each department within the government also had their own official supervisor, a "Special Section" staffed by the MGB to keep tabs on and regulate the employees, and to ensure the absence of disloyalty.

The Ministry retained a high level of autonomy and a remarkable amount of freedom of operation within the Soviet system, as the agency was only responsible to the Central Committee. MGB agents had the power to arrest and sentence opponents upon receiving approval from a higher authority, a clause oft ignored. The OSO (the Special Council of the State Security Ministry) convicted arrestees charged with committing political crimes, including espionage, and could banish them from certain areas, or from the USSR entirely.

In Stalin’s last years, between 1945 and 1953, more than 750,000 Soviet citizens were arrested and punished. Many of the arrests made by the MGB were founded on flimsy or fabricated evidence, most notably on the "suspicion of espionage" (podozreniye shpionazha, or PSh). Since in many cases it is impossible to prove any espionage activities or even an intention to spy, the case is built on the "suspicion of espionage", making acquittal impossible.

== Structure ==
The general structure of the MGB is much the same as both the organization it came from, the NKGB, and the organization that followed, the KGB

The MGB was composed of several departments or directorates with a specific purpose within the organization.

=== Major departments ===
==== First Main Directorate ====
First Main Directorate was responsible for foreign intelligence. The First Main Directorate maintained surveillance over the "Soviet colony" (SK – Sovetskaya koloniya), i.e., the personnel of Soviet diplomatic, trade, technical, cultural, and other agencies functioning abroad. It also sought to infiltrate foreign governmental bodies, businesses, public organizations, sensitive industrial plants, cultural and educational institutions, etc., placing MGB agents in strategic posts for intelligence-gathering and possible covert action.

In 1947 the GRU (military intelligence) and MGB's 1st Main Directorate were combined into the recently created foreign intelligence agency, the Committee of Information (KI), under the control of Vyacheslav Molotov, in an attempt to streamline the intelligence needs of the State. In 1948, the military personnel in KI were returned to the GRU. KI sections dealing with the new East Bloc and Soviet émigrés were returned to the MGB later that year. In 1951, the KI returned to the MGB, as a First Main Directorate of the Ministry of State Security.

==== Second and Third Main Directorates ====
The Second Main Directorate focused on domestic counterintelligence and acted as an internal security and political police force. The goal of this department was to combat foreign intelligence operations within the USSR and its territories. The Second Directorate worked mainly inside the country to combat foreign espionage and to study the forms and methods used by foreign intelligence services on the territory of the U.S.S.R. The work it did abroad aimed to organize operational-technical intelligence, i.e., the investigation of the forms, working methods and regulations of the intelligence, counterintelligence, and police and administrative organs of foreign countries.

The Third Main Directorate was concerned with military counterintelligence. It carried out many of the same tasks as SMERSH, which it absorbed, as it conducted political surveillance of armed forces. It relied heavily on the Army Special Section to ensure the loyalties of the soldiers and officers. The MGB operatives were used to supervise personnel and daily action, as well as to carry out counterintelligence operations.

==== Fifth Main Directorate ====
The Fifth Main Directorate evolved out of the Main Secret Political Administration. It was responsible for regulating and repressing real or imagined dissent within the party apparatus and Soviet society. This involved supervising almost every aspect of Soviet life, including the intelligentsia, bureaucracy, general administrative agencies, cultural organizations, educational institutions, and even the party apparatus itself. They investigated the political reliability of the entire population of the Soviet Union, with particular attention to the Party and Soviet apparatus, up to the highest leaders of the Party and government.

They secretly supervised the activity of the entire administrative and economic apparatus of the state and all scientific, public, church, and other organizations. The goal was to hunt down "deviations from the general line," "opposition leanings" within the party to ferret out and eliminate "bourgeois nationalism" in the Soviet satellites, i.e., anti-Soviet movements under the guise of nationalism.

=== Minor departments ===
==== Fourth Directorate ====
At the beginning of the MGB, the Fourth Directorate was designed as a proto-terrorist force to combat the anti-Soviet underground, nationalist formations, and hostile elements. Viktor Abakumov dissolved this department in 1946, but kept the main players in a Special Service group so that they could continue with the same pattern of violence that the Fourth Directorate was known for. The group was dissolved in 1949.

Upon the destruction of the Fourth Directorate as a terrorist group, the department was transitioned into Transportation Security. It was responsible for the preparation and security of mobilization and transport. The department was responsible for counterintelligence and surveillance operations within their transport programs.

==== Sixth Directorate ====
This department was a short-lived organization designed to collect and process Signals intelligence, or SIGINT. The department was initially composed of the NKGB's 5th Directorate (responsible for wartime communications) and an independent cryptography department, the 2nd Special Department. However, this Directorate was competing with another better-funded communications organization, Department ‘R’, which specialized in radio counterintelligence. The 6th Directorate was dissolved in 1949, and its resources and personnel absorbed into the Special Services Department (GUSS), a cryptanalysis and information security branch of the Central Committee.

==== Economic Administration ====
Known as the ‘K’ Division, this organization supervised the economy and ran economic counterintelligence and industrial security. They were concerned with the implementation of security programs and requirements, as well as the supervision and monitoring of the workers, leading them to make extensive use of the Special Sections within the state and local organizations.

==== Second Special Administration ====
Sometimes called the Seventh Directorate, this section was responsible for providing the tools, techniques, and manpower to accommodate the physical surveillance needs of the MGB. They offered facilities, devices, and methodology to help with the demands of the intelligence departments. They were able to do both outdoor (tailing) and photographic surveillance, as well as being able to tap phone lines, monitor conversations in other rooms through hidden microphones and covertly examining mail. They also had sections devoted to codes, cryptography, and ciphers.

==== Division for the Protection of Leaders ====
Otherwise known as the Guards Directorate, they were charged with the personal security of the top party officials. The Division provided personal security to members and alternates of the Presidium of the Central Committee, ministers of the U.S.S.R. and their deputies, secretaries of the Central Committee, and a number of high officeholders specifically listed. The Division was also responsible for guarding important agencies and installations of the secret police themselves.

A number of the top officials from this department were implicated in the Doctors' plot, showing the inherent mistrust and suspicion within the Soviet security apparatus.

== List of ministers ==
- Vsevolod Merkulov (15 March 1946 – 4 May 1946)
- Viktor Abakumov (4 May 1946 – 14 July 1951)
- Sergei Ogoltsov (14 July 1951 – 9 August 1951) (acting)
- Semyon Ignatiev (9 August 1951 – 5 March 1953)

== Major campaigns ==
- Doctors' plot
- Leningrad affair
- Mingrelian affair
- Night of the Murdered Poets
- Operation North

== Intelligence operations ==
- Red Orchestra
- Cambridge Five

== In popular culture ==
- In Tom Rob Smith's novel Child 44, the first in the Leo Demidov trilogy, Demidov is an MGB agent

== See also ==
- Eastern Bloc politics
- Stasi
