= Orders, decorations, and medals of the Soviet Republics =

The Russian Soviet Federative Socialist Republic was founded after the October Revolution in the Russian Republic and very soon had to create an award system. The award systems of parallel Soviet states soon followed and they also created and issued awards of their own, mainly in a similar style to the Russian Soviet Federative Socialist Republic. In 1924, the Union Of Soviet Socialist Republics started to award all-union Orders and within a decade all the Orders of member republics had ceased to be awarded. Some Republics such as the Tuvan People's Republic only replaced their own award system with the Soviet Union's after joining and therefore were issued to a later date.

== Russian Soviet Federative Socialist Republic ==
Russian Soviet Federative Socialist Republic

Badge	Name (English/Russian/Translit)	Creation Date	Description	Number Awarded
Order Of The Red Banner	Order Of The Red Banner; Орден Крaсного Знамени; Orden Krasnogo Znameni	1918-09-16	The Order of the Red Banner recognised military deeds and functioned as the highest and only military order of the RSFSR. This award was phased out after the establishment of the Soviet Union equivalent which was based on this design.	c. 22,000
	Order Of The Red Banner Of Labour; Орден Трудового Красного Знамени; Orden Trudovogo Krasnogo Znameni	1920-12-28	The Order of the Red Banner of Labour of the RSFSR was established as the civilian counterpart of the military Order of the Red Banner and was awarded for exceptional working achievements. This award was phased out after the establishment of the Soviet Union equivalent.	163
	Medal "3rd Anniversary Of The Great October Socialist Revolution"; Медаль «3-я годовщина Великой Октябрьской социалистической революции Medal «3-ja godovshchina Velikoj Oktjabr'skoj sotsialisticheskoj revoljutsii»	1920-10-?	Awarded on the event of the 3rd Anniversary of the Soviet take over of Russia. This medal was never part of the award system of the Soviet Union.	c. 3000 Silver c. 400 Bronze
	Badge Of Distinction "Hero Of Labour"; Знак Отличия «Герой Труда» Znak Otlichija «Geroj Truda»	1922		

=== Mountain Autonomous Soviet Socialist Republic ===
Badge	Name (English/Russian/Translit)	Creation Date	Description	Number Awarded
	Badge Of Distinction Of The Mountain Autonomous Soviet Socialist Republic; Знак Отличия Горской Автономной Советской Социалистической Республики; Znak Otlinchija Gorskoj Avtonomnoj Sovetskoj Sotsialisticheskoj Respubliki	1920		

== Georgian Soviet Socialist Republic ==
Georgian Soviet Socialist Republic

Badge	Name (English/Georgian)	Creation Date	Description	Number Awarded
Order Of The Red Banner	Order Of The Red Banner «წითელი დროშის» ორდენი	1923	The Order of the Red Banner recognised military deeds and functioned as the highest and only military order of the Georgian Soviet Socialist Republic.	
	Order Of The Red Banner Of Labour «შრომის წითელი დროშის» ორდენი	1928		180

== Armenian Soviet Socialist Republic ==
Armenian Soviet Socialist Republic

Badge	Name (English/Russian/Translit)	Creation Date	Description	Number Awarded
	Order of the Red Banner of Labour of Armenia; Орден Трудового Красного Знамени АрССР; Orden Trudovogo Krasnogo Znameni ArSSR	1931-10-19	Орден - за безупречный труд и усердие в Армянской ССР.	<70
	Order of Labour of Armenia; Орден Труда АрССР; Orden Trudа ArSSR	1923-3-?	Орден - за безупречный труд и усердие в Армянской ССР.	~95

== Azerbaijan Soviet Socialist Republic ==
Azerbaijan Soviet Socialist Republic

Badge	Name (English/Azeri)	Creation Date	Description	Number Awarded
	Order Of The Red Banner «Qırmızı Bayraq» Ordeninə	1920	The Order of the Red Banner recognised military deeds and functioned as the highest and only military order of the Azerbaijan Soviet Socialist Republic.	
	Order Of Labour «Əmək» Ordeni	1922		54
	Order Of The Red Banner Of Labour «Qırmızı Əmək Bayrağı» Ordeni	1929		~300

== Byelorussian Soviet Socialist Republic ==
Byelorussian Soviet Socialist Republic

Badge	Name (English/Belarusian)	Creation Date	Description	Number Awarded
	Order Of The Red Banner Of Labour; Ордэн «Працоўнага Чырвонага Сцяга»	1924-10-10		169

== Khorezm People's Soviet Republic ==
Khorezm People's Soviet Republic

Badge	Name (English)	Creation Date	Description	Number Awarded
	Order Of Labour	1922		~100

== Ukrainian Soviet Socialist Republic ==
Ukrainian Soviet Socialist Republic

Badge	Name (English/Ukrainian)	Creation Date	Description	Number Awarded
Order Of The Red Banner	Order Of The Red Banner Of Labour; Орден «Трудового Червоного Прапора»	1921		400

== Tajik Autonomous Soviet Socialist Republic ==
Tajik Autonomous Soviet Socialist Republic

Badge	Name (English)	Creation Date	Description	Number Awarded
	Order Of The Red Banner Of Labour	1921		~250

== Transcaucasian Socialist Federative Soviet Republic ==
Transcaucasian Socialist Federative Soviet Republic

Badge	Name (English)	Creation Date	Description	Number Awarded
	Order Of The Red Banner Of Labour	1923-01		c. 140

== Tuvan People's Republic ==
Tuvan People's Republic

Badge	Name (English)	Creation Date	Description	Number Awarded
	Order Of Tuvan People's Republic	1935		

== Bukharan People's Soviet Republic ==
Bukharan People's Soviet Republic

Badge	Name (English)	Creation Date	Description	Number Awarded
Order Of The Red Star 1st Class	Order Of The Red Star; 1st Class	1922-07-03		
Order Of The Red Star 2nd Class	Order Of The Red Star; 2nd Class	1922-07-03		
Order Of The Red Star 3rd Class	Order Of The Red Star; 3rd Class	1922-07-03		

== See also ==
- Orders, decorations, and medals of the Soviet Union
- Socialist orders of merit
