= Bogdan Kobulov =

Soviet politician (1904–1953)

- Born: March 1, 1904; Tiflis, Russian Empire
- Died: December 23, 1953 (aged 49); Moscow, RSFSR, Soviet Union
- Cause of death: Execution by shooting

Bogdan Zakharovich Kobulov (Russian: Богда́н Заха́рович Кобу́лов; 1 March 1904 – 23 December 1953) was a Soviet security officer who served as a senior member of the security- and police-apparatus during the rule of Joseph Stalin. After Stalin's death he was arrested and executed along with his former chief and patron Lavrentiy Beria.

== Career ==
Bogdan Kobulov was born in Tbilisi, the son of an Armenian tailor. He left school early, and was reputedly illiterate. He did odd jobs before being drafted into the Red Army in 1921. He joined Cheka in 1922, and held minor posts, until he was spotted by Beria in 1931 and recruited to the Secret Political department of the OGPU in Georgia. In April 1937, during the Great Purge, he was appointed head of the Secret-Political Department of the Georgian NKVD, which meant that he was in charge of eliminating officers associated with the ex-head of the NKVD, Genrikh Yagoda.

In December 1938, after Beria took control of the NKVD, he transferred Kobulov to Moscow, as head of the newly created Investigative Directorat of the NKVD. He was in charge of major investigations, including the mass executions of thousand of Polish prisoners in the Katyn woods in 1940. He was also in charge of the case against Beria's predecessor, Nikolai Yezhov. In May 1939, he signed the warrant for the arrest of the writer Isaac Babel. From 1939, he was a candidate member of the Central Committee of the Communist Party. From April 1939, he was Head of the Main Economic Department of the NKVD/MGB. In 1944, he was involved in the mass deportation of the Chechens and other small nations, for which he was awarded the Order of the Red Banner. After 1945, he was transferred to the Ministry of Foreign Trade, but was brought back to the security organs as First Deputy Minister of Internal Affairs, under Beria, after the death of Stalin in March 1953.

At the zenith of his career as a state security officer Kobulov was Beria's torture specialist. The young physicist Yakov Terletsky remembers seeing the "egg-shaped" Kobulov in an anteroom to Beria's office at Lubyanka in 1945 and estimated his weight at above 400 pounds (180 kg).

When Beria fell from power, Kobulov was arrested along with his boss on 27 June 1953; he was convicted on multiple charges, including espionage, and sentenced to death and executed on 23 December 1953.
