= State Political Directorate =

Soviet national security agency (1922–1923)

- (GPU pri NKVD RSFSR)
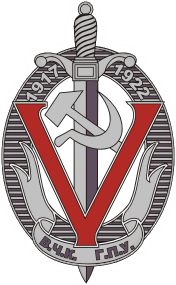
- Badge commemorating 5 years of the Cheka–GPU

Agency overview
- Formed: 6 February 1922; 104 years ago
- Preceding agency: Cheka
- Dissolved: 15 November 1923; 102 years ago
- Superseding agency: OGPU
- Type: Secret police Intelligence agency
- Headquarters: Lubyanka, Moscow, RSFSR, USSR
- Agency executive: Felix Dzerzhinsky (1922–1923)
- Parent agency: NKVD

The State Political Directorate (Russian: Государственное политическое управление, romanized: Gosudarstvennoe politicheskoe upravlenie), abbreviated as GPU (ГПУ), was the secret police of the Russian Socialist Federative Soviet Republic (RSFSR) from February 1922 to November 1923. It was the immediate successor of the Cheka, and was replaced by the Joint State Political Directorate (OGPU).

The full official designation was the State Political Directorate (also State Political Administration) under the People's Commissariat for interior affairs of the Russian Soviet Federative Socialist Republic (Russian: Государственное политическое управление при Народном комиссариaте внутренних дел РСФСР, romanized: Gosudarstvennoe politicheskoe upravlenie pri Narodnom komissariate vnutrennikh del RSFSR; abbr. ГПУ при НКВД РСФСР, GPU pri NKVD RSFSR).

== Establishment and functions ==
Formed from the Cheka, the original Russian state security organization, on February 6, 1922, it was initially known under the Russian abbreviation GPU—short for "State Political Directorate under the NKVD of the RSFSR" (Russian: Государственное политическое управление при НКВД РСФСР, romanized: Gosudarstvennoe politicheskoe upravlenie pri NKVD RSFSR). Its first chief was the Cheka's former chairman, Felix Dzerzhinsky.

=== Internal security ===
On paper, the new agency was supposed to act with more restraint than the Cheka. For example, unlike the Cheka, it did not have the right to shoot suspected "counter-revolutionaries" at will. All those suspected of political crimes had to be brought before a judge in normal circumstances.

=== Foreign intelligence ===
The 'Foreign Department' of the GPU was headed by a former Bolshevik and party member, Mikhail Trilisser. The Foreign Department was placed in charge of intelligence activities overseas, including espionage and liquidation of 'enemies of the people'. Trilisser himself was later liquidated by Joseph Stalin during the Great Purge in 1940.

== Reorganization ==
With the creation of the USSR in December 1922, a unified organization was required to exercise control over state security throughout the new union. Thus, on November 15, 1923, the GPU left the Russian NKVD and was reorganized as the all-union Joint State Political Directorate. Its official name was "Joint State Political Directorate under the Council of People's Commissars of the USSR" (Russian: Объединённое государственное политическое управление при СНК СССР, romanized: Obyedinyonnoe gosudarstvennoe politicheskoe upravlenie pri SNK SSSR), or OGPU (ОГПУ).
