= Chronology of Soviet secret police agencies =

There were a succession of Soviet secret police agencies over time. The Okhrana was abolished by the Provisional government after the first revolution of 1917, and the first secret police after the October Revolution, created by Vladimir Lenin's decree on December 20, 1917, was called "Cheka" (ЧК). Officers were referred to as "chekists", a name that is still informally applied to people under the Federal Security Service of Russia, the KGB's successor in Russia after the dissolution of the Soviet Union.

For most agencies listed here, secret policing operations were only part of their function; for instance, the KGB was both a secret police and an intelligence agency.

== History of the Soviet state security organs ==
=== Detailed chronology ===
- Cheka (abbreviation of Vecheka, itself an acronym for "All-Russian Extraordinary Committee to Combat Counter-Revolution and Sabotage" of the Russian SFSR)
  - Felix Dzerzhinsky (December 20, 1917 – July 7, 1918)
  - Jēkabs Peterss (July 7, 1918 – August 22, 1918) (acting)
  - Felix Dzerzhinsky (August 22, 1918 – February 6, 1922)

February 6, 1922: Cheka transforms into GPU, a department of the NKVD of the Russian SFSR.

- NKVD – "People's Commissariat for Internal Affairs"
  - GPU – State Political Directorate
    - Felix Dzerzhinsky (February 6, 1922 – November 15, 1923)

November 15, 1923: GPU leaves the NKVD and becomes all-union OGPU under direct control of the Council of People's Commissars of the USSR.

- OGPU – "Joint State Political Directorate" or "All-Union State Political Board"
  - Felix Dzerzhinsky (November 15, 1923 – July 20, 1926)
  - Vyacheslav Menzhinsky (July 30, 1926 – May 10, 1934)
  - Genrikh Yagoda (May 10, 1934 – July 10, 1934)

July 10, 1934: NKVD of the Russian SFSR ceases to exist and transforms into the all-union NKVD of the USSR; OGPU becomes GUGB ("Main Directorate for State Security") in the all-union NKVD.

- NKVD – "People's Commissariat for Internal Affairs"
  - GUGB – "Main Directorate for State Security"
    - Genrikh Yagoda (July 10, 1934 – September 26, 1936)
    - Nikolai Yezhov (September 26, 1936 – November 25, 1938)
    - Lavrentiy Beria (November 25, 1938 – February 3, 1941)

February 3, 1941: The GUGB of the NKVD was briefly separated out into the NKGB, then merged back in, and then on April 14, 1943, separated out again.

- NKGB – "People's Commissariat for State Security"
  - Vsevolod Merkulov (February 3, 1941 – July 20, 1941) (NKGB folded back into NKVD)
- NKVD – "People's Commissariat for Internal Affairs"
  - GUGB – "Main Directorate for State Security"
    - Lavrentiy Beria (July 20, 1941 – April 14, 1943)
- NKGB – "People's Commissariat for State Security"
  - Vsevolod Merkulov (April 14, 1943 – March 15, 1946) (NKGB reseparated from NKVD)

March 18, 1946: All People's Commissariats were renamed to Ministries.

- MGB – "Ministry of State Security"
  - Vsevolod Merkulov (March 15, 1946 – May 4, 1946)
  - Viktor Abakumov (May 4, 1946 – July 14, 1951)
  - Sergei Ogoltsov (July 14, 1951 – August 9, 1951) (acting)
  - Semyon Ignatiev (August 9, 1951 – March 5, 1953)

The East German secret police, the Stasi, took their name from this iteration.

- KI – "Committee of Information" (foreign intelligence service)
  - Pyotr Fedotov MGB
  - Fedor Kuznetsov GRU
  - Yakov Malik Foreign Ministry

May 30, 1947: Official decision with the expressed purpose of "upgrading coordination of different intelligence services and concentrating their efforts on major directions". In the summer of 1948 the military personnel in KI were returned to the Soviet military to reconstitute foreign military intelligence service (GRU). KI sections dealing with the new East Bloc and Soviet émigrés were returned to the MGB in late 1948. In 1951 the KI returned to the MGB.

March 5, 1953: MVD and MGB are merged into the MVD by Lavrentiy Beria.

- MVD – "Ministry of Internal Affairs"
  - Lavrentiy Beria (March 5, 1953 – June 26, 1953)
  - Sergei Kruglov (June 26, 1953 – March 13, 1954)

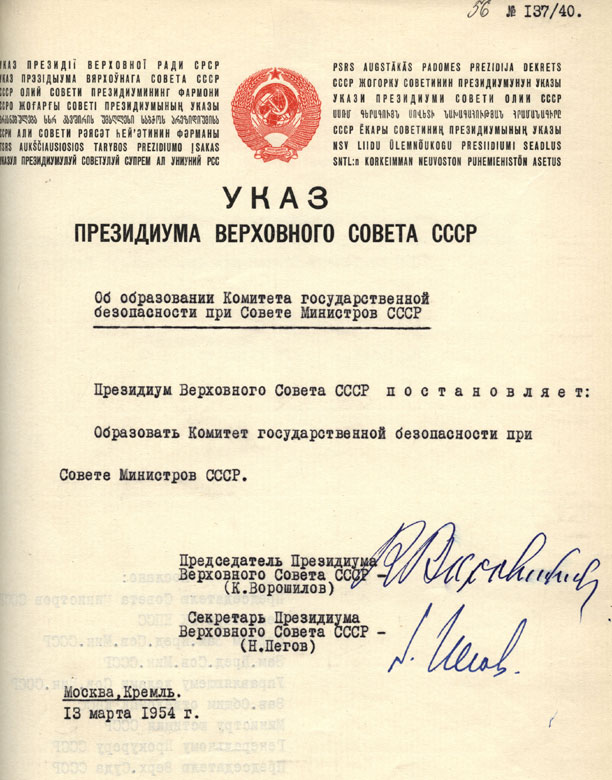
The 1954 ukase establishing the KGB.

March 13, 1954: Newly independent force became the KGB, as Beria was purged and the MVD divested itself again of the functions of secret policing. After renamings and tumults, the KGB remained stable until 1991.

- KGB – Committee for State Security
  - Ivan Serov (March 13, 1954 – December 8, 1958)
  - Konstantin Lunev (December 8, 1958 – December 25, 1958) (acting)
  - Alexander Shelepin (December 25, 1958 – November 5, 1961)
  - Pyotr Ivashutin (November 5, 1961 – November 13, 1961) (acting)
  - Vladimir Semichastny (November 13, 1961 – May 18, 1967)
  - Yuri Andropov (May 18, 1967 – May 26, 1982)
  - Vitaly Fedorchuk (May 26, 1982 – December 17, 1982)
  - Viktor Chebrikov (December 17, 1982 – October 1, 1988)
  - Vladimir Kryuchkov (October 1, 1988 – August 28, 1991)
  - Leonid Shebarshin (August 22, 1991 – August 23, 1991) (acting)
  - Vadim Bakatin (August 29, 1991 – December 3, 1991)

In the aftermath of the 1991 Soviet coup attempt, when the State Emergency Committee failed to overthrow Gorbachev and Yeltsin took over, General Vadim Bakatin was given instructions to dissolve the KGB.

In Russia today, KGB functions are performed by the Foreign Intelligence Service (SVR), the Federal Counterintelligence Service which later became the Federal Security Service of the Russian Federation (FSB) in 1995, and the Federal Protective Service (FSO). The GRU continues to operate as well.

=== Leadership ===
Organization	Chairman	Dates
Cheka Чека	Felix Dzerzhinsky	1917–1918
Cheka Чека	Jēkabs Peterss	July 7–August 22 1918 (act.)
Cheka Чека	Felix Dzerzhinsky	1918–1922
GPU ГПУ	Felix Dzerzhinsky	1922–1923
OGPU ОГПУ	Felix Dzerzhinsky	1923–1926
OGPU ОГПУ	Vyacheslav Menzhinsky	1926–1934
OGPU ОГПУ	Genrikh Yagoda	May–Jul 1934
NKVD НКВД	Genrikh Yagoda	1934–1936
NKVD НКВД	Nikolai Yezhov	1936–1938
NKVD НКВД	Lavrentiy Beria	1938–1941
NKGB Нкгб	Vsevolod Merkulov	Feb–Jul 1941
NKVD НКВД	Lavrentiy Beria	1941–1943
NKGB Нкгб	Vsevolod Merkulov	1943–1946
MGB МГБ	Vsevolod Merkulov	March 15–May 4 1946
MGB МГБ	Viktor Abakumov	1946–1951
MGB МГБ	Sergei Ogoltsov	July 14–August 9 1951 (act.)
MGB МГБ	Semyon Ignatiev	1951–1953
MVD КГБ	Lavrentiy Beria	Mar–Jun 1953
MVD КГБ	Sergei Kruglov	1953–1954
KGB КГБ	Ivan Serov	1954–1958
KGB КГБ	Konstantin Lunev	December 8–25 1958 (act.)
KGB КГБ	Alexander Shelepin	1958–1961
KGB КГБ	Pyotr Ivashutin	November 5–November 13 1961 (act.)
KGB КГБ	Vladimir Semichastny	1961–1967
KGB КГБ	Yuri Andropov	1967–1982
KGB КГБ	Vitaly Fedorchuk	May–Dec 1982
KGB КГБ	Viktor Chebrikov	1982–1988
KGB КГБ	Vladimir Kryuchkov	1988–1991
KGB КГБ	Leonid Shebarshin	August 22–23 1991 (act.)
KGB КГБ	Vadim Bakatin	Aug–Dec 1991

== See also ==
- Bibliography of the Russian Revolution and Civil War § Violence and terror
- Bibliography of Stalinism and the Soviet Union § Terror, famine and the Gulag
- Bibliography of the Post Stalinist Soviet Union § Human rights
- Commanders of the border troops USSR and RF
- Director of the Federal Security Service
- Director of the Foreign Intelligence Service
- FAPSI – State communications, formed from the former 8th and 16th Directorates of KGB and later merged into FSB
- List of chairmen of the KGB
- Poison laboratory of the Soviet secret services
