= List of chairmen of the KGB =

Coordinates: 55.7587°N 37.6256°E

Chairman of the Committee for State Security
- Flag of the Chairman

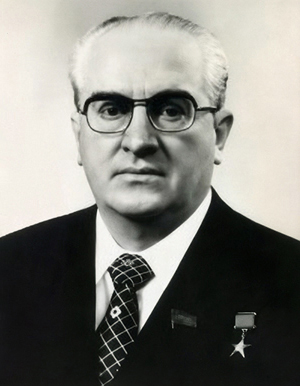
- Longest serving Yuri Andropov; 18 May 1967–26 May 1982
- Committee for State Security
- Seat: Lubyanka Building, 2 Bolshaya Lubyanka Street, Moscow, Russian SFSR
- Appointer: Premier
- Precursor: Minister of State Security
- Formation: 13 March 1954
- First holder: Ivan Serov
- Final holder: Vadim Bakatin
- Abolished: 3 December 1991
- Superseded by: Head of the Inter-republican Security Service
- Deputy: First Deputy Chairman

The chairman of the KGB was the head of the Committee for State Security (KGB), the main security agency of the Soviet Union in 1954–1991. He was assisted by one or two first deputy chairmen, and four to six deputy chairmen. He was also the head of the Collegium of the KGB—which consisted of the chairman, deputy chairmen, directorate chiefs, and one or two republic-level KGB organization chairmen—who affected key policy decisions.

In 1934–1943 the Soviet State Security agency was part of the People's Commissariat for Internal Affairs (NKVD) as the Main Directorate of State Security (GUGB). The director of the GUGB was the first deputy of the People's Commissar of Interior.

== List of officeholders ==
No.	Portrait	Name (birth–death)	Term of office			Leader
No.	Portrait	Name (birth–death)	Took office	Left office	Time in office	Leader
Chairman of the Cheka (1917–1922)
1		Felix Dzerzhinsky (1877–1926)	20 December 1917	7 July 1918	199 days	Vladimir Lenin (1917–1924)
—		Jēkabs Peterss (1886–1938) Acting	7 July 1918	22 August 1918	46 days	Vladimir Lenin (1917–1924)
(1)		Felix Dzerzhinsky (1877–1926)	22 August 1918	6 February 1922	3 years, 168 days	Vladimir Lenin (1917–1924)
(1)	Chairman of the GPU–OGPU (1922, 1923–1934)					
(1)		Felix Dzerzhinsky (1877–1926)	6 February 1922	20 July 1926	4 years, 164 days	Vladimir Lenin (1917–1924); Joseph Stalin (1924–1953)
2		Vyacheslav Menzhinsky (1874–1934)	30 July 1926	10 May 1934	7 years, 284 days	Joseph Stalin (1924–1953)
3		Genrikh Yagoda (1891–1938)	10 May 1934	10 July 1934	61 days	Joseph Stalin (1924–1953)
3	People's Commissar for Internal Affairs (1934–1941)					
3		Genrikh Yagoda (1891–1938)	10 July 1934	26 September 1936	2 years, 78 days	Joseph Stalin (1924–1953)
4		Nikolai Yezhov (1895–1940)	26 September 1936	25 November 1938	2 years, 60 days	Joseph Stalin (1924–1953)
5		Lavrentiy Beria (1899–1953)	25 November 1938	3 February 1941	2 years, 70 days	Joseph Stalin (1924–1953)
People's Commissar for State Security (1941)
6		Vsevolod Merkulov (1895–1953)	3 February 1941	20 July 1941	167 days	Joseph Stalin (1924–1953)
People's Commissar for Internal Affairs (1941–1943)
(5)		Lavrentiy Beria (1899–1953)	20 July 1941	14 April 1943	1 year, 268 days	Joseph Stalin (1924–1953)
(6)	People's Commissar for State Security (1943–1946)					
(6)		Vsevolod Merkulov (1895–1953)	14 April 1943	15 March 1946	2 years, 335 days	Joseph Stalin (1924–1953)
(6)	Minister of State Security (1946–1953)					
(6)		Vsevolod Merkulov (1895–1953)	15 March 1946	4 May 1946	50 days	Joseph Stalin (1924–1953)
7		Viktor Abakumov (1908–1954)	4 May 1946	14 July 1951	5 years, 71 days	Joseph Stalin (1924–1953)
—		Sergei Ogoltsov (1900–1976) Acting	14 July 1951	9 August 1951	26 days	Joseph Stalin (1924–1953)
8		Semyon Ignatiev (1904–1983)	9 August 1951	5 March 1953	1 year, 208 days	Joseph Stalin (1924–1953)
Minister of Internal Affairs (1953–1954)
(5)		Lavrentiy Beria (1899–1953)	5 March 1953	26 June 1953	113 days	Georgy Malenkov (1953–1953); Nikita Khrushchev (1953–1964)
9		Sergei Kruglov (1907–1977)	26 June 1953	13 March 1954	260 days	Georgy Malenkov (1953–1953); Nikita Khrushchev (1953–1964)
Chairman of the Committee for State Security (1954–1991)
10		Ivan Serov (1905–1990)	13 March 1954	8 December 1958	4 years, 270 days	Nikita Khrushchev (1953–1964)
—		Konstantin Lunev (1907–1980) Acting	8 December 1958	25 December 1958	17 days	Nikita Khrushchev (1953–1964)
11		Alexander Shelepin (1918–1994)	25 December 1958	5 November 1961	2 years, 315 days	Nikita Khrushchev (1953–1964)
—		Pyotr Ivashutin (1909–2002) Acting	5 November 1961	13 November 1961	8 days	Nikita Khrushchev (1953–1964)
12		Vladimir Semichastny (1924–2001)	13 November 1961	18 May 1967	5 years, 186 days	Nikita Khrushchev (1953–1964); Leonid Brezhnev (1964–1982)
13		Yuri Andropov (1914–1984)	18 May 1967	26 May 1982	15 years, 8 days	Leonid Brezhnev (1964–1982)
14		Vitaly Fedorchuk (1918–2008)	26 May 1982	17 December 1982	205 days	Leonid Brezhnev (1964–1982); Yuri Andropov (1982–1984)
15		Viktor Chebrikov (1923–1999)	17 December 1982	1 October 1988	5 years, 289 days	Yuri Andropov (1982–1984); Konstantin Chernenko (1984–1985); Mikhail Gorbachev (1985–1991)
16		Vladimir Kryuchkov (1924–2007)	1 October 1988	28 August 1991	2 years, 331 days	Mikhail Gorbachev (1985–1991)
—		Leonid Shebarshin (1935–2012) Acting	22 August 1991	23 August 1991	1 day	Mikhail Gorbachev (1985–1991)
17		Vadim Bakatin (1937–2022)	29 August 1991	3 December 1991	96 days	Mikhail Gorbachev (1985–1991)

== See also ==
- Chronology of Soviet secret police agencies
- Director of the Federal Security Service
- Director of the Foreign Intelligence Service

== Sources ==
- Christopher Andrew and Vasili Mitrokhin, The Mitrokhin Archive: The KGB in Europe and the West, Gardners Books (2000), ISBN 0-14-028487-7 Basic Books (1999), hardcover, ISBN 0-465-00310-9; trade paperback (September, 2000), ISBN 0-465-00312-5
- John Barron, "KGB: The Secret Work of Soviet Secret Agents", Reader's Digest Press (1974), ISBN 0-88349-009-9
- Vasili Mitrokhin and Christopher Andrew, The World Was Going Our Way: The KGB and the Battle for the Third World, Basic Books (2005) hardcover, 677 pages ISBN 0-465-00311-7
