= Nikolai Dudorov =

Soviet politician and civil servant (1906–1977)

- Николай Дудоров

Minister of Internal Affairs
- In office 31 January 1956 – 1 May 1960
- Prime Minister: Nikolai Bulganin; Nikita Khrushchev
- Vice President: Frol F. Kozlov; Anastas I. Mikoyan
- Leader: Nikita Khrushchev
- Preceded by: Sergei Kruglov
- Succeeded by: Nikolai Shchelokov

Personal details
- Born: 1906 Mishnevo
- Died: March 1977 (aged 70–71) Moscow
- Resting place: Novodevichy Cemetery
- Party: Communist Party of the Soviet Union
- Spouse: Zoya Alekseevna Dudorova
- Children: 2
- Education: Mendeleev Institute

Nikolai Dudorov (Russian: Николай Павлович Дудоров; 1906–1977) was a Soviet politician who served as the minister of internal affairs between 1956 and 1960.

== Early life and education ==
Dudorov was born in a village, Mishnevo, in Vladimir province in 1906. In 1927 he joined the Communist Party. He attended the Mendeleev Institute in Moscow from 1929 and graduated in 1934.

== Career ==
Following his graduation Dudorov began to work as a factory shop manager. In 1937 he became part of the industrial bureaucracy and was appointed secretary of the committee of the heavy industry of the Communist Party. After serving in various posts he was named as the head the construction department of the Communist Party's central committee in December 1954.

Dudorov was appointed minister of internal affairs, and his appointment was endorsed by the Presidium on 30 January 1956. He replaced Sergei Kruglov in the post. On 25 February he was also elected a full member of the central committee of the Communist Party in the twentieth congress.

Dudorov's appointment as the minister of internal affairs was the end of the hegemony of the NKVD (People's Commissariat for Internal Affairs) origin figures in the ministry. One of the reasons for Dudorov's appointment by Soviet leader Nikita Khrushchev was his organization skills which were needed to reorganize the Gulag system, the network of forced labor camps. Dudorov advocated parole as a solution to the Gulag problem. He also developed a detailed plan to modify the Gulag, but his plan was not accepted by the related commission although it included three major points, namely Khrushchev's idea of smaller camps, Stalin's views on the prison camps based on industrial development and dominant ideas of the ministry executives on criminals. Later, Dudorov managed to implement a plan to reorganize the penal system depending on smaller colonies, but the plan was not a success. Dudorov's reformist views could not save him from the dismissal on 1 May 1960. Dudorov's membership in the central committee of the Communist party also ended in 1961.

From 1960 to 1967 Dudorov was the general commissioner of the World Exhibition. His last post was the head of a department under the Moscow City executive committee which he held from 1962 to his retirement in 1972 .

== Personal life and death ==
Dudorov was married to Zoya Alekseevna Dudorova (1910–2002), and they had two children, a daughter and a son.

Dudorov died in Moscow in March 1977 and buried there in the Novodevichy Cemetery.

=== Awards ===
Dudorov was the recipient of the Order of Lenin (twice), the Order of the Red Banner of Labour and the Order of the Red Star.
