= Aleksandr Vlasov (politician) =

Russian politician and engineer (1932–2002)

- Александр Власов

Head of the Economic and Social Policy Department of the Communist Party of the Soviet Union of the Central Committee
- In office 14 July 1990 – 29 August 1991
- Preceded by: Vladimir Shimko
- Succeeded by: Office abolished

Chairman of the Council of Ministers of the Russian SFSR
- In office 3 October 1988 – 15 June 1990
- President: Vitaly Vorotnikov; Boris Yeltsin
- Preceded by: Vitaly Vorotnikov
- Succeeded by: Ivan Silayev

Minister of Interior Affairs of the Soviet Union
- In office January 1986 – 20 October 1988
- Preceded by: Vitaly Fedorchuk
- Succeeded by: Vadim Bakatin

Personal details
- Born: Aleksandr Vladimirovich Vlasov; 20 January 1932 Babushkin, Buryat-Mongol ASSR, Russian SFSR, USSR
- Died: 9 June 2002 (aged 70) Moscow, Russia
- Party: Communist Party of the Soviet Union (1956–1991)
- Education: Irkutsk Mining Metallurgical Institute

Aleksandr Vladimirovich Vlasov (Russian: Александр Владимирович Власов; 20 January 1932 – 9 June 2002) was a Soviet politician, who held different cabinet posts, including interior minister and prime minister. He was the last communist prime minister of Russia, and a close ally of Mikhail Gorbachev.

== Early life and education ==
Vlasov was born into a Russian family in Babushkin, Buryat-Mongol ASSR, Russian SFSR (now Buryatia, Russia) on 20 January 1932. He attended the Irkutsk Mining Metallurgical Institute and graduated with a degree in mining engineering in 1954.

== Career ==
Vlasov worked as a foreman in an eastern Siberia mine. He left the job less than in a year and joined the Communist Party in 1956. Then he began to work in the Komsomol.

In 1965, Vlasov was named as second secretary of Yakut party obkom. He also worked a member of the military council of the North Caucasian military district when Gorbachev was working there. Vlasov began to work at the central committee of the Communist Party in Moscow from 1972. He was promoted to first secretary of the party in the Checheno-Ingush ASSR in 1975. Then Vlasov became first secretary of the party in Rostov in southern Russia in 1984.

In January 1986, Vlasov was appointed interior minister, replacing Vitaly Fedorchuk in the post. Then Vlasov was appointed to the Politburo as a non-voting member in late September 1988. His tenure as interior minister lasted until 10 October 1988. Vadim Bakatin replaced him as interior minister.

Vlasov was elected as prime minister of the Russian Republic by the Supreme Soviet on 3 October 1988. He succeeded Vitaly Vorotnikov in the post.

Vlasov was nominated for presidency of the Supreme Soviet in May 1990. However, he lost the election to Boris Yeltsin who outpolled him, 535 votes to 467, receiving just 4 votes more than the minimum required for election.

== Decorations and awards ==
- Order of Lenin
- Order of the October Revolution
- Order of the Badge of Honour, twice
