= Sbornik KGB SSSR =

Soviet KGB internal journal, 1959–1991

Sbornik KGB SSSR (ru:Сборник КГБ СССР) (USSR KGB Review), was a Russian-language secret inhouse journal published by the Soviet KGB in Moscow for the use of its branches and officers only.

The KGB created the bimonthly journal in April 1959 and about 150 issues were issued until it stopped publication in December 1991 (from 1988 it was a monthly). Its first editor was the head of the KGB's Fourth Directorate, Yevgeny Pitovranov, followed by Fyodor Shcherbak.

The journal was later compiled and produced by the KGB's Dzerzhinsky Red Banner Higher School. By the 1980s, it was under the control of a deputy chair of the KGB's Inspection Directorate.

In 1990, an unrelated publication of the same name began appearing, but soon stopped publication.
