= Viktor Chebrikov =

Soviet politician (1923–1999)

- Виктор Чебриков
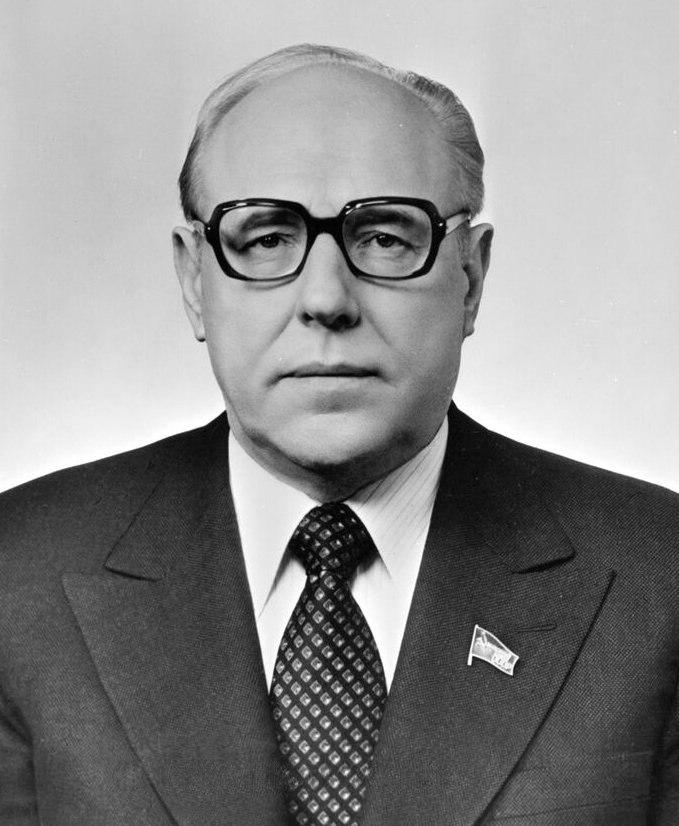
- Official portrait, 1984

6th Chairman of the KGB
- In office 17 December 1982 – 1 October 1988
- Premier: Nikolai Tikhonov; Nikolai Ryzhkov
- Preceded by: Vitaly Fedorchuk
- Succeeded by: Vladimir Kryuchkov

Full member of the 26th, 27th Politburo
- In office 23 April 1985 – 20 September 1989

Candidate member of the 26th Politburo
- In office 26 December 1983 – 23 April 1985

Member of the 27th Secretariat
- In office 30 September 1988 – 20 September 1989

Personal details
- Born: Viktor Mikhailovich Chebrikov; 27 April 1923 Yekaterinoslav, Ukrainian SSR, Soviet Union
- Died: 2 July 1999 (aged 76) Moscow, Russian Federation
- Party: Communist Party of the Soviet Union (1950–1989)

Military service
- Allegiance: Soviet Union
- Branch/service: Red Army; KGB
- Years of service: 1941–1946; 1967–1988
- Rank: Army General
- Battles/wars: World War II; Soviet–Afghan War

Viktor Mikhailovich Chebrikov (Russian: Виктор Михайлович Че́бриков; 27 April 1923 – 2 July 1999) was a Soviet public official and security administrator and head of the KGB from December 1982 to October 1988.

== Life and career ==
Born in the industrial city of Yekaterinoslav in eastern Ukrainian SSR, Soviet Union (now Dnipro, Ukraine) on 27 April 1923, he finished military school in 1942 and served in World War II as a battalion commander. From July 1942, he commanded a platoon of a cadet rifle regiment in the 64th Army on the Stalingrad Front, but on August 14, 1942, he was seriously wounded. After his recovery, he was deputy platoon commander and commander of a mortar platoon in the 262nd Infantry Regiment of the 184th Infantry Division on the Southwestern and Stalingrad fronts. From 1943 until the end of the war he fought in the ranks of the 575th Infantry Regiment of the 161st Infantry Division on Stepnoye, from August 1943 - on Voronezh, from October 1943 - on the 1st Ukrainian, from August 1944 - on the 4th Ukrainian fronts. His contemporaries describe him as having fought bravely and selflessly. At the front, he was wounded three times (one severe wound and two medium ones), shell-shocked and frostbitten, but each time he returned to duty.

After the war Chebrikov wanted to continue his military career, but was refused by the prestigious Frunze Military Academy because of his bad eyesight; abandoning his military ambitions, he earned an engineering degree, joined the Communist Party in 1950, and embarked on a political-administrative career, rising through the Ukrainian party ranks until he became First Secretary of the Dnipropetrovsk Party Committee in 1961. In 1967, he was brought to Moscow as personnel manager for the Central Committee of the Communist Party of the Soviet Union. He was Deputy chairman of the KGB under Yuri Andropov from 1968-1982. They began an anti-corruption drive that continued until Andropov's death.

Through information supplied by American spy Aldrich Ames, Chebrikov was able to dismantle the network of CIA operatives in his country. Chebrikov was highly respected for his skills among his American counterparts; according to Kenneth E. deGraffenreid, the senior White House intelligence official in the Ronald Reagan administration: "One has to say that Chebrikov's term as KGB chief was the heyday of the KGB in terms of foreign intelligence. In terms of intelligence production—spies, and dishing the Americans on the secrets—they were going strong right up to the end. We uncovered 80 spies during those years. These guys were on the make, and there was no question about their influence."

== Work in the Committee for State Security ==
As Chairman of the KGB of the USSR, Chebrikov became known primarily as the initiator of the investigation of the "Uzbek case" about high levels of corruption in Uzbekistan, which resulted in the sudden death of the first secretary of the Central Committee of the Communist Party of Uzbekistan and candidate for membership in the Politburo of the Central Committee of the CPSU Sharof Rashidov, arrests of dozens of high-ranking leaders of Uzbekistan. Some other high-ranking corrupt officials were exposed and convicted (up to capital punishment). Also, in the period 1983-1986, almost all known dissidents were arrested or expelled from the Union of Soviet Socialist Republics, which led to paralysis of the dissident movement.

However, Chebrikov sided with officials such as Yegor Ligachyov who believed Gorbachev's glasnost and perestroika reforms were being implemented too quickly. After the 19th Communist Party Conference confirmed the party's support for Gorbachev's reforms, officials who had opposed them were dismissed from office in the autumn of 1988. An October 1988 extraordinary session of the Supreme Soviet, which had been granted more power by the conference, dismissed Chebrikov as KGB Chairman and replaced him with General Vladimir Kryuchkov.

== Recognition ==
Chebrikov was awarded four Orders of Lenin (22 March 1966; 13 December 1977; 26 April 1983; 12 February 1985), Orders of the October Revolution (31 August 1971), Red Banner (21 May 1945), Alexander Nevsky (24 August 1944), Patriotic War 1st degree (04/23/1985), three Orders of the Red Banner of Labor (19 July 1958; 26 April 1973; 8 October 1980). He was also awarded medals, including "For Courage" (1 February 1943). Awards from other countries include Order of the February Victory (Czechoslovakia, 5 November 1984). He received the USSR State Prize (1980, for participation in the creation of special equipment).

Government offices
Preceded by Vitaly Fedorchuk	Chairman of the State Committee for State Security; 1982–1988	Succeeded by Vladimir Kryuchkov
