= Sergei Kruglov (politician) =

Soviet general and politician (1907–1977)

- Сергей Круглов
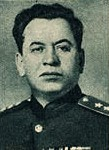

Minister of Internal Affairs
- In office 26 June 1953 – 31 January 1956
- Preceded by: Lavrentiy Beria
- Succeeded by: Nikolai Dudorov (MGB); Ivan Serov (KGB)
- In office 15 March 1946 – 5 March 1953
- Preceded by: Himself (as People's Commissar for Internal Affairs)
- Succeeded by: Lavrentiy Beria

People's Commissar for Internal Affairs
- In office 29 December 1945 – 15 March 1946
- Preceded by: Lavrentiy Beria
- Succeeded by: Himself (as Minister of Internal Affairs)

Personal details
- Born: Sergei Nikiforovich Kruglov; Russian: Серге́й Никифорович Круглов; 2 October 1907 Ustye, Zubtsov Uyezd, Tver Governorate, Russian Empire
- Died: 6 July 1977 (aged 69) Moscow Oblast, Russian SFSR, Soviet Union
- Party: Communist Party of the Soviet Union (1928–1960)
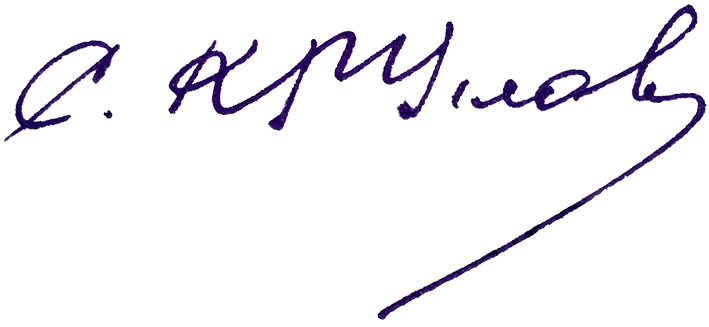
- Signature

Military service
- Allegiance: Soviet Union
- Branch/service: Red Army; GUGB; NKVD; MGB
- Years of service: 1929–1930; 1938–1956
- Rank: Colonel general
- Commands: 4th Sapper Army
- Battles/wars: World War II; Anti-communist insurgencies in Central and Eastern Europe; Baltic Insurgency; Ukraine Insurgency

Sergei Nikiforovich Kruglov (2 October 1907 – 6 July 1977) was the Minister of Internal Affairs of the Soviet Union from January 1946 to March 1953 and again from June 1953 until February 1956. He held the military rank of Colonel General. He was involved in several brutal actions of the Soviet security forces. These actions occurred in the 1940s and were carried out alongside his comrade-in-arms General Ivan Serov.

Kruglov was fluent in several foreign languages, including English, and was awarded the Legion of Merit and created an Honorary Knight Commander of the Order of the British Empire for organizing the security of the Yalta Conference and the Potsdam Conference during World War II.

== Early life and career ==
Sergei Kruglov was born on October 2, 1907, in a village in the Tver Governorate of the Russian Empire; his family was of poor peasant stock. In 1931 Kruglov himself went on to receive education, studying at the Karl Liebknecht Institute in Moscow, the Japanese Department of the Soviet Institute of Eastern Cultures and the very prestigious Institute of Red Professors. His education was mostly about politics, international affairs, and foreign languages, in strong contrast with the scientists, economists and engineers that predominated in the Soviet political elite.

== Security services career under Stalin ==
=== 1938 through the end of World War II ===
Kruglov began working for the Soviet security forces in the early 1930s. In December 1938, as a part of the Great Purge, he was made a Special Plenipotentiary of the NKVD (Особоуполномоченный НКВД), with responsibility for investigating and prosecuting NKVD personnel. He played an active role in purging NKVD protégés of Nikolay Yezhov.

On February 28, 1939, Kruglov became Deputy Commissar for Personnel of the People's Commissar of Internal Affairs of the USSR, and a Chief of the Personnel Division of the NKVD. At the time of that appointment Kruglov held the rank of Major of state security (equivalent of a KOMBRIG). In 1939 Kruglov also became a Candidate Member of the Central Committee of the Communist Party of the Soviet Union.

In February 1941 Kruglov was appointed First Deputy Commissar under Lavrentiy Beria. He retained that position, with a brief interruption, until December 1945. During that period Kruglov was largely responsible in the NKVD for things such as finances, administration, personnel, and the Gulag system.

During World War II, Kruglov had several military assignments. In 1941 he was a member of the Military Council of the Soviet Reserve Front and subsequently, commander of the 4th Sapper Army. During the initial months of the war he organized special Blocking Detachments, which performed mass executions of Soviet military personnel accused of desertion or unauthorized retreat.

In 1944–1945, Kruglov was one of the main Soviet officials in charge of the mass deportation of Chechens and Ingushes. For his role in organizing these deportations, Kruglov was awarded the Order of Suvorov, first degree, which was usually given for exceptional bravery in front-line combat.

In January 1944 Kruglov and Vsevolod Merkulov prepared an NKVD report on the Katyn massacre which blamed the massacre on the Germans. The NKVD report was used later in 1944 as a basis by the "Special Commission for Determination and Investigation of the Shooting of Polish Prisoners of War by German-Fascist Invaders in Katyn Forest" (also known as the Burdenko Commission), which reached the same pre-determined conclusions.

In the summer of 1944, when Soviet troops re-took Lithuania from the Germans, Kruglov supervised punitive measures against Lithuanian partisans who resisted Soviet control.

In 1945, Kruglov was promoted to the rank of Colonel General of the NKVD.

Kruglov was appointed an Honorary Knight Commander of the Order of the British Empire during the Potsdam Conference, becoming the only Soviet intelligence officer to receive an honorary knighthood.

=== 1945 to 1953: at the height of power ===
On December 29, 1945, Kruglov replaced Lavrentiy Beria as the People's Commissar of Internal Affairs of the Soviet Union (head of NKVD). In 1946 the Soviet government transitioned to the ministerial system and the security apparatus underwent substantial reorganization. NKVD became the Soviet Ministry of Internal Affairs (MVD), with Kruglov as its chief, the Minister of Internal Affairs. NKGB became the Soviet Ministry of State Security (MGB), and it was headed by Viktor Abakumov, who replaced Beria's protégé Vsevolod Merkulov. Beria became Deputy Prime Minister and retained overall nominal control over both MVD and MGB, which were both, however, now led by Beria's adversaries.

Although Kruglov rose through the ranks of Beria's machine, he was not considered a Beria loyalist and after the war allied himself with Viktor Abakumov, a Beria rival. The elevation of Kruglov and Abakumov is now seen by historians as part of a deliberate strategy by Joseph Stalin to limit Beria's influence after the end of the war.

Kruglov's authority as the Minister of Internal Affairs fluctuated significantly over the period 1946–1953. In the beginning this authority included overall control over the Soviet Militsiya (the Soviet Union's regular police force), the paramilitary Internal Troops, running of the Gulag system, border guard, and other areas. In the late 1940s and early 1950s some of this authority had been transferred from MVD to MGB and by 1953 MVD has been mostly in charge only of running the Gulag prison camp system. However, for most of that period Kruglov remained the head of the State Special Commission (Особое совещание), an extrajudicial body with authority to prosecute those charged with crimes against the State.

In 1948 Kruglov organized mass deportation of the German population of the Kaliningrad oblast (formerly East Prussia) – the area around Königsberg that was annexed by the Soviet Union at the conclusion of World War II.

In January 1948 Kruglov and Abakumov presented for Stalin's signature a memorandum that significantly toughened the Gulag conditions for political prisoners. Many of those who had been arrested at the height of the Great Purge in 1937-38 and given 10-year prison sentences and managed to survive their time in Gulag were due for release. The Abakumov-Kruglov memorandum, approved by Stalin, authorized the creation of a special system of labor camps for political prisoners. MVD was authorized to hold, when deemed necessary, such political prisoners beyond the expiration dates of their sentences and to send them to the so-called administrative exile (административная ссылка) in the cases where formal release did occur. Thereafter, both significant terms of administrative exile, given after the completion of the nominal prison sentences, and significant delays of the nominal release after such completion of sentences (referred to as "overstaying one's welcome"), became standard MVD practices in running the Gulag system.

As head of the MVD, Kruglov played a key role in supplying the Gulag prison labor for the Soviet nuclear program headed by Beria. After a successful Soviet nuclear test in August 1949, Kruglov was awarded the Order of Lenin.

In 1948 Andrei Zhdanov, who had been a patron of both Kruglov and Abakumov, died and Kruglov's position was temporarily in danger. Beria and Malenkov engineered the so-called Leningrad Affair which resulted in the persecution of many party officials connected to Zhdanov. However, as Stalin still needed a counterweight to Beria, both Kruglov and Abakumov retained their posts, although Beria's position was strengthened.

In 1952-1956 Kruglov was a member of the Central Committee of Communist Party of the Soviet Union (CPSU), to which position he was elected at the 19th Congress of the CPSU. Kruglov was a member of the Supreme Soviet of the USSR in 1946–1950 and 1954–1958.

== Post-Stalin career and later life ==
After Stalin's death in March 1953, the Soviet security services were reorganized again. In March 1953 MGB was merged into MVD and Beria became the Minister of Internal Affairs with Sergei Kruglov serving as his First Deputy. Both Kruglov and Ivan Serov played key roles in the June 1953 arrest of Beria, engineered by Nikita Khrushchev and Malenkov.

After Beria's arrest in June 1953, Kruglov became the Minister of Internal Affairs again, with Kruglov's long-term protégé Ivan Serov being appointed as Deputy Minister of Internal Affairs.

Kruglov remained the Minister of Internal Affairs until 1956, although in 1954 MGB was again split away from MVD and renamed as KGB, with Ivan Serov becoming its head.

Kruglov was one of the few leaders of the Stalin-era security apparatus to survive after Stalin's death in March 1953. Beria himself was executed in December 1953. Kruglov's long-term ally Viktor Abakumov was arrested in July 1951 in connection with the so-called Doctor's Plot; Abakumov was not released after Stalin's death and was executed in December 1954.

However, in February 1956, Khrushchev fired Kruglov from the position of Minister of Internal Affairs, where Kruglov was replaced by a Khrushchev loyalist, Nikolay Dudorov; prior to Kruglov's dismissal his ministry came under some official criticism and the star of Kruglov's former protégé and then KGB's head Ivan Serov was seen as rising and displacing Kruglov's influence in the Soviet hierarchy.

After his departure from the Ministry of Internal Affairs, Kruglov was transferred to the post of Deputy Minister of Electric Power-Stations. In August 1957 Kruglov was demoted further to an even smaller administrative post. In 1958 Kruglov was sent into retirement as an invalid. In 1959 Kruglov was stripped of his general's pension and evicted from his elite apartment. In 1960 he was expelled from CPSU for complicity in the Stalin-era political repressions. Even after Khrushchev's ousting in 1964, Kruglov's fortunes did not improve. Kruglov died in 1977 under unclear circumstances. Several sources state that Kruglov died due to accidentally being hit by a train. Other sources suggest suicide or a heart attack as the cause of his death.
