= KGB =

Main Soviet security agency from 1954 to 1991

- Комитет государственной безопасности (КГБ СССР); Komitet gosudarstvennoy bezopasnosti (KGB SSSR)

Agency overview
- Formed: 13 March 1954; 72 years ago
- Preceding agencies: Cheka (1917–1922); GPU (1922–1923); OGPU (1923–1934); NKVD (1934–1943); GUGB (1934–1941/1941–1943); NKGB (February–July 1941/1943–1946); MGB (1946–1953); MVD (1953–1954)
- Dissolved: 3 December 1991; 34 years ago
- Superseding agencies: MSB (1991); TsSR (1991); AFB (1991); KOGG (1991)
- Type: State committee of union-republican jurisdiction
- Jurisdiction: Central Committee and Council of Ministers; (1954–1990); Supreme Council and President; (1990–1991)
- Headquarters: Lubyanka Building, 2 Bolshaya Lubyanka Street, Moscow, Soviet Union
- Motto: Loyalty to the party – Loyalty to the motherland; Верность партии — Верность Родине
- Agency executive: Chairman
- Child agencies: Foreign intelligence: First Chief Directorate; Counter-Intelligence: Second Chief Directorate; Political police: Fifth Chief Directorate; Cryptography: Eighth Chief Directorate; Protective Service: Ninth Chief Directorate; Chief Directorate of Border Forces

The Committee for State Security (Russian: Комитет государственной безопасности, romanised: Komitet gosudarstvennoy bezopasnosti, IPA: [kəmʲɪˈtʲed ɡəsʊˈdarstvʲɪn(ː)əj bʲɪzɐˈpasnəsʲtʲɪ]), abbreviated as KGB (Russian: КГБ, IPA: [ˌkɛɡɛˈbɛ];) was the main security agency of the Soviet Union from 1954 to 1991. It was the direct successor of preceding Soviet secret police agencies including the Cheka, OGPU, and NKVD. Attached to the Council of Ministers, it was the chief government agency of "union-republican jurisdiction", carrying out internal security, foreign intelligence, counter-intelligence and secret police functions. Similar agencies operated in each of the republics of the Soviet Union aside from the Russian SFSR, where the KGB was headquartered, with many associated ministries, state committees and state commissions.

The agency was a military service governed by army laws and regulations, in the same fashion as the Soviet Army or the MVD Internal Troops. While most of the KGB archives remain classified, two online documentary sources are available. Its main functions were foreign intelligence, counter-intelligence, operative-investigative activities, guarding the state border of the USSR, guarding the Soviet leadership, preserving the security of government communications as well as combating dissent and separatism within Soviet society.

On 3 December 1991, the KGB was officially dissolved. It was succeeded in Russia by the Foreign Intelligence Service (SVR) and what would later become the Federal Security Service (FSB). Following the 1991–1992 South Ossetia War, the self-proclaimed Republic of South Ossetia established its own KGB, keeping the unreformed name. In addition, Belarus established its successor to the KGB of the Byelorussian SSR in 1991, the Belarusian KGB, also keeping the unreformed name.

== History ==
Restructuring in the MVD following the fall of Lavrentiy Beria in June 1953 resulted in the formation of the KGB under Ivan Serov in March 1954.

Secretary Leonid Brezhnev overthrew Premier Nikita Khrushchev in 1964. Brezhnev (in power: 1964–1982) was concerned about ambitious spy-chiefs – the communist party had managed Serov's successor, the ambitious KGB Chairman, Aleksandr Shelepin (in office: 1958–1961), but Shelepin carried out Brezhnev's palace coup d'état against Khrushchev in 1964 (despite Shelepin not then being in the KGB). Brezhnev sacked Shelepin's successor and protégé, Vladimir Semichastny (in office: 1961–1967) as KGB Chairman and reassigned him to a sinecure in the Ukrainian Soviet Socialist Republic. Shelepin found himself demoted from the chairman of the Committee of Party and State Control in 1965 to Trade Union Council chairman (in office 1967–1975).

In the 1980s, the Soviet Union glasnost provoked KGB Chairman Vladimir Kryuchkov (in office: 1988–1991) to lead the August 1991 Soviet coup d'état in an attempt to depose President Mikhail Gorbachev. The failed coup d'état and the collapse of the USSR heralded the end of the KGB on 3 December 1991. The KGB's modern-day successors are the FSB (Federal Security Service of the Russian Federation) and the SVR (Foreign Intelligence Service).

== In the US ==
=== Between the World Wars ===
The GRU (Foreign military intelligence service of the Soviet Union) recruited the ideological agent Julian Wadleigh, who became a State Department diplomat in 1936. The NKVD's first US operation was establishing the legal residency of Boris Bazarov and the illegal residency of Iskhak Akhmerov in 1934. Throughout, the Communist Party USA (CPUSA) and its General Secretary Earl Browder, helped NKVD recruit Americans, working in government, business, and industry.

Other important, low-level and high-level ideological agents were the diplomats Laurence Duggan and Michael Whitney Straight in the State Department, the statistician Harry Dexter White in the Treasury Department, the economist Lauchlin Currie (an FDR advisor), and the "Silvermaster Group", headed by statistician Greg Silvermaster, in the Farm Security Administration and the Board of Economic Warfare. Moreover, when Whittaker Chambers, formerly Alger Hiss's courier, approached the Roosevelt Government to identify the Soviet spies Duggan, White, and others, he was ignored. Hence, during the Second World War (1939–45)—at the Tehran (1943), Yalta (1945), and Potsdam (1945) conferences—Big Three Ally Joseph Stalin of the USSR, was better informed about the war affairs of his US and UK allies than they were about his.

Soviet espionage was at its most successful in collecting scientific and technological intelligence about advances in jet propulsion, radar and encryption, which impressed Moscow, but stealing atomic secrets was the capstone of NKVD espionage against Anglo–American science and technology. To wit, British Manhattan Project team physicist Klaus Fuchs (GRU 1941) was the main agent of the Rosenberg spy ring. In 1944, the New York City residency infiltrated top secret Los Alamos National Laboratory in New Mexico by recruiting Theodore Hall, a 19-year-old Harvard physicist.

=== During the Cold War ===
The KGB failed to rebuild most of its US illegal resident networks. The aftermath of the Second Red Scare (1947–57) and the crisis in the CPUSA hampered recruitment. The last major illegal resident, Rudolf Abel (Vilyam Genrikhovich Fisher/"Willie" Vilyam Fishers), was betrayed by his assistant, Reino Häyhänen, in 1957.

Recruitment then emphasised mercenary agents, an approach especially successful in scientific and technical espionage, since private industry practised lax internal security, unlike the US Government. One notable KGB success occurred in 1967, with the walk-in recruitment of US Navy Chief Warrant Officer John Anthony Walker. Over eighteen years, Walker enabled Soviet Intelligence to decipher some one million US Navy messages, and track the US Navy.

In the late Cold War, the KGB was successful with intelligence coups in the cases of the mercenary walk-in recruits FBI counterspy Robert Hanssen (1979–2001) and CIA Soviet Division officer Aldrich Ames (1985–1994).

== In the Soviet Bloc ==
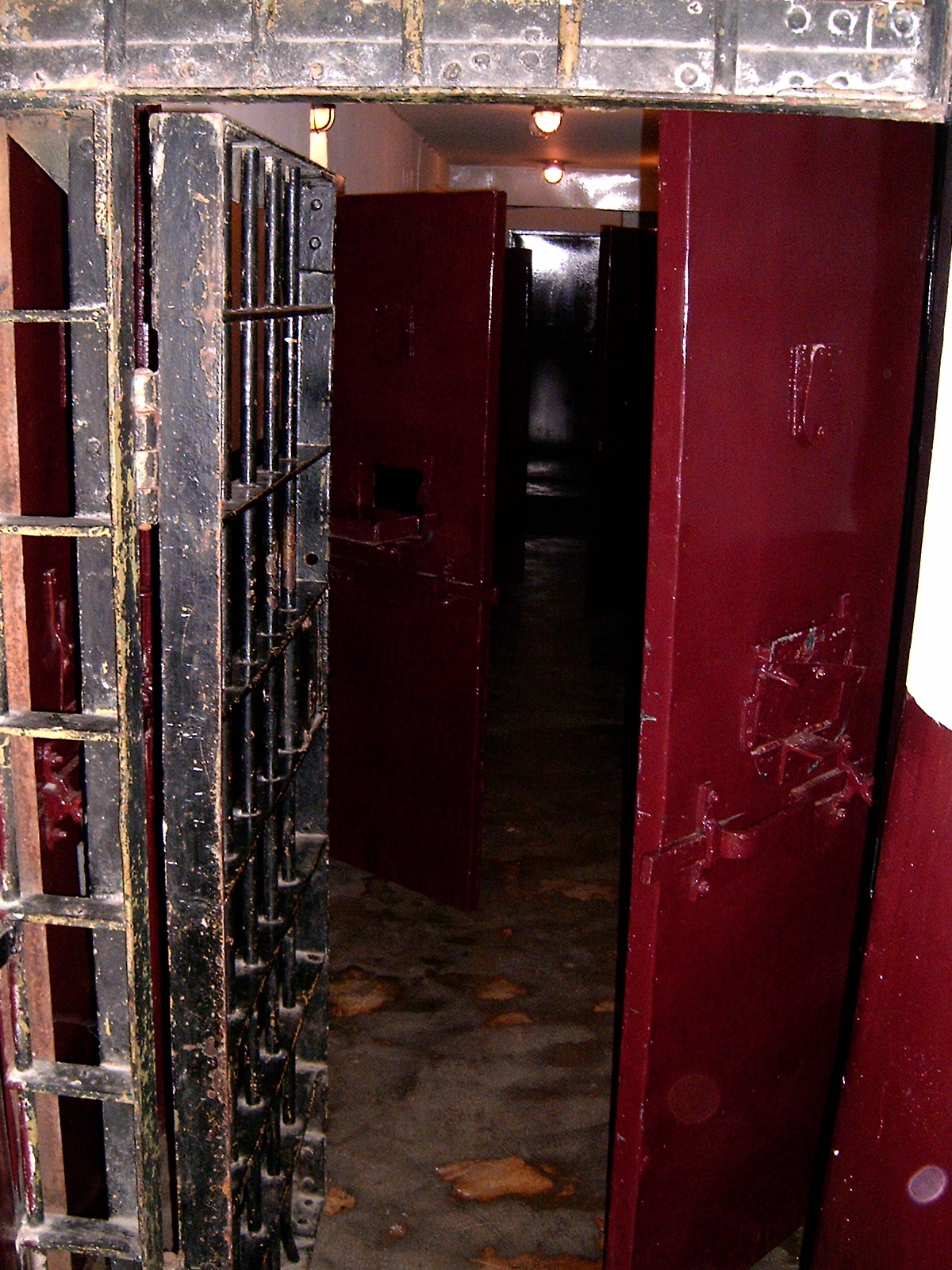
Cell doors at the KGB Cells Museum in Tartu, Estonia in 2007

It was Cold War policy for the KGB of the Soviet Union and the secret services of the satellite states to extensively monitor public and private opinion, internal subversion and possible revolutionary plots in the Soviet Bloc. In supporting those Communist governments, the KGB was instrumental in crushing the Hungarian Revolution of 1956 and the Prague Spring of "Socialism with a Human Face" in Czechoslovakia, 1968.

During the Hungarian revolt the founding member KGB chairman Ivan Serov personally supervised the post-invasion "normalization" of the country. Consequently, the KGB monitored the satellite state populations for occurrences of "harmful attitudes" and "hostile acts"; yet, stopping the Prague Spring, deposing a nationalist Communist government, was its greatest achievement.

The KGB prepared the Red Army's route by infiltrating Czechoslovakia with many illegal residents disguised as Western tourists. They were to gain the trust of and spy upon the most outspoken proponents of Alexander Dubček's new government. They were to plant subversive evidence, justifying the USSR's invasion, that right-wing groups—aided by Western intelligence agencies—were going to depose the Communist government of Czechoslovakia. Finally, the KGB prepared hardline, pro-USSR members of the Communist Party of Czechoslovakia (KSČ), such as Alois Indra and Vasiľ Škultéty, to assume power after the Red Army's invasion.

The KGB's Czech success in the 1960s was matched with the failed suppression of the Solidarity labour movement in 1980s Poland. The KGB had forecast political instability consequent to the election of Archbishop of Kraków Karol Wojtyla as the first Polish Pope, John Paul II, whom they had categorised as "subversive" because of his anti-Communist sermons against the one-party régime of the Polish United Workers' Party (PZPR). Despite its accurate forecast of crisis, the PZPR hindered the KGB from destroying the nascent Solidarity-backed political movement, fearing explosive civil violence if they imposed the KGB-recommended martial law. Aided by their Polish counterpart, the Security Service (Służba Bezpieczeństwa—SB), the KGB successfully infiltrated spies to Solidarity and the Catholic Church, and in Operation X co-ordinated the declaration of martial law with Gen. Wojciech Jaruzelski and the Polish Communist Party; however, the vacillating, conciliatory Polish approach blunted KGB effectiveness—and Solidarity then fatally weakened the Communist Polish government in 1989.

Nadezhin saw that China threatened the USSR by claiming a historic right to regions under the USSR's control. China also wanted to displace the USSR as the leader of the international socialist movement. The KGB wanted to infiltrate the Chinese security services with "a sufficient number of agents". Top agents also believed that the KGB needed to do more to ensure the protection of the USSR from Chinese spies.

== Notable operations ==
- With the Trust Operation (1921–1926), the OGPU successfully deceived some leaders of the right-wing, counter-revolutionary White Guards back to the USSR for execution.
- NKVD infiltrated and destroyed Trotskyist groups; in 1940, the Spanish agent Ramón Mercader assassinated Leon Trotsky in Mexico City.
- KGB favoured active measures (e.g. disinformation), in discrediting the USSR's enemies.
- For war-time, KGB had ready sabotage operations arms caches in target countries.

According to declassified documents, the KGB aggressively recruited former German (mostly Abwehr) intelligence officers after the war. The KGB used them to penetrate the West German intelligence service.

In the 1960s, acting upon the information of KGB defector Anatoliy Golitsyn, the CIA counter-intelligence chief James Jesus Angleton believed KGB had moles in two key places—the counter-intelligence section of CIA and the FBI's counter-intelligence department—through whom they would know of, and control, US counter-espionage to protect the moles and hamper the detection and capture of other Communist spies. Moreover, KGB counter-intelligence vetted foreign intelligence sources, so that the moles might "officially" approve an anti-CIA double agent as trustworthy. In retrospect, the captures of the moles Aldrich Ames and Robert Hanssen proved that Angleton, though ignored as over-aggressive, was correct, despite the fact that it cost him his job at CIA, which he left in 1975.

In the mid-1970s, the KGB tried to secretly buy three banks in Northern California to gain access to high-technology secrets. Their efforts were thwarted by the CIA. The banks were Peninsula National Bank in Burlingame, the First National Bank of Fresno, and the Tahoe National Bank in South Lake Tahoe. These banks had made numerous loans to advanced technology companies and had many of their officers and directors as clients. The KGB used the Moscow Narodny Bank to finance the acquisition, and an intermediary, Singaporean businessman Amos Dawe, as the frontman.

=== Bangladesh ===
On 2 February 1973, the Politburo, which was led by Yuri Andropov at the time, demanded that KGB members influence Bangladesh (which was then newly formed), where Sheikh Mujibur Rahman was scheduled to win parliamentary elections. During that time, the Soviet secret service tried hard to ensure support for his party and his allies and even predicted an easy victory for him. In June 1975, Mujib formed a new party called BAKSAL and created a one-party state. Three years later, the KGB in that region increased from 90 to 200, and by 1979, it printed more than 100 newspaper articles. In these articles, the KGB officials accused Ziaur Rahman, popularly known as "Zia", and his regime of having ties with the United States.

In August 1979, the KGB accused some officers who were arrested in Dhaka in an overthrow attempt, and by October, Andropov approved the fabrication of a letter in which he stated that Muhammad Ghulam Tawab, an Air Vice-Marshal at the time, was the main plotter, which led the Bangladesh, Indian and Sri Lankan press to believe that he was an American spy. Under Andropov's command, Service A, a KGB division, falsified the information in a letter to Moudud Ahmed in which it said that he was supported by the American government and by 1981 even sent a letter accusing the Reagan administration of plotting to overthrow President Zia and his regime. The letter also mentioned that after Mujib was assassinated, the United States contacted Khondaker Mostaq Ahmad to replace him as a short-term President. When the election happened at the end of 1979, the KGB made sure that the Bangladesh Nationalist Party would win. The party received 207 out of 300 seats, but the Zia regime did not last long, falling on 29 May 1981 when after numerous escapes, Zia was assassinated in Chittagong.

=== Afghanistan ===
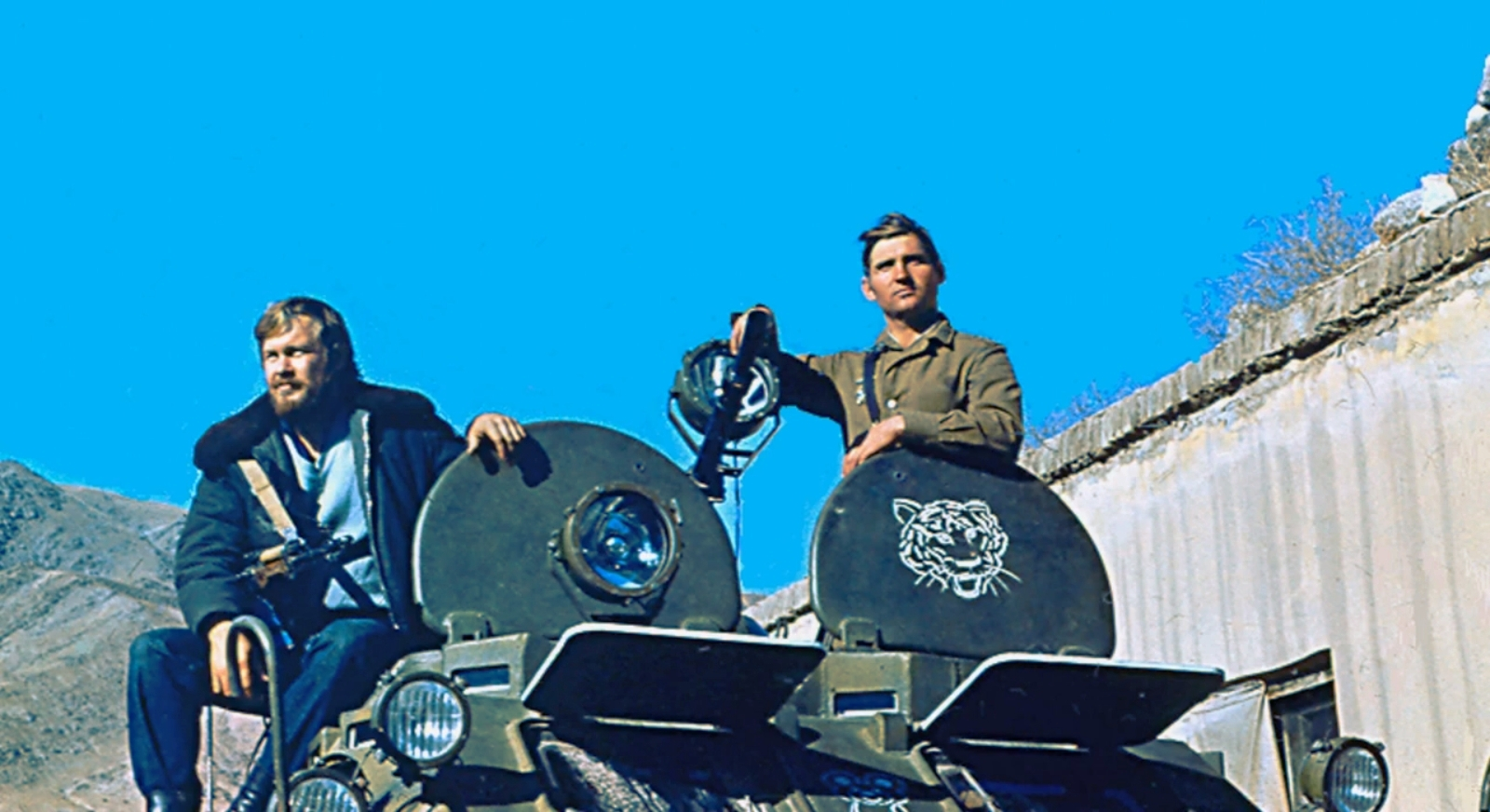
KGB special operative Igor Morozov (left) sits on top of the BTR-60 armoured vehicle during his assignment to the Badakhshan Province, c. 1982.

The KGB started infiltrating Afghanistan as early as 27 April 1978. During that time, the People's Democratic Party of Afghanistan (PDPA) was planning the overthrow of President Mohammed Daoud Khan. Under the leadership of Major General Sayed Mohammad Gulabzoy and Muhammad Rafi – code named Mammad and Niruz respectively – the Soviet secret service learned of the imminent uprising. Two days after the uprising, Nur Muhammad Taraki, leader of the PDPA, issued a notice of concern to the Soviet ambassador Alexander Puzanov and the resident of Kabul-based KGB embassy Viliov Osadchy that they could have staged a coup three days earlier hence the warning. On that, both Puzanov and Osadchy dismissed Taraki's complaint and reported it to Moscow, which broke a 30-year contract with him soon after.

The centre then realised that it was better for them to deal with a more competent agent, which at the time was Babrak Karmal, who later accused Taraki of taking bribes and even of having secretly contacted the United States embassy in Kabul. On that, the centre again refused to listen and instructed him to take a position in the Kabul residency by 1974. On 30 April 1978, Taraki, despite being cut off from any support, led the coup which later became known as Saur Revolution, and became the country's leader, with Hafizullah Amin as vice-chairman of the Council of Ministers and vice-chairman of the Revolutionary Council. On 5 December 1978, Taraki compared the Saur Revolution to the Russian Revolution, which struck Vladimir Kryuchkov, the FCD chief of that time.

On 27 March 1979, after losing the city of Herat in an uprising, Amin became the next Prime Minister, and by 27 July became Minister of Defense as well. The centre though was concerned of his powers since the same month he issued them a complaint about lack of funds and demanded US$400,000,000. Furthermore, it was discovered that Amin had a master's degree from Columbia University, and that he preferred to communicate in English instead of Russian. Unfortunately for Moscow's intelligence services, Amin succeeded Taraki and by 16 September Radio Kabul announced that the PDPA received a fake request from Taraki concerning health issues among the party members. On that, the centre accused him of "terrorist" activities and expelled him from the party.

The following day General Boris Ivanov, who was behind the mission in Kabul along with General Lev Gorelov and Deputy Defense Minister Ivan Pavlovsky, visited Amin to congratulate him on his election to power. On the same day the KGB decided to imprison Sayed Gulabzoy as well as Mohammad Aslam Watanjar and Assadullah Sarwari but while in captivity and under an investigation all three denied the allegation that the current Minister of Defence was an American secret agent. The denial of claims was passed on to Yuri Andropov and Leonid Brezhnev, who as the main chiefs of the KGB proposed operation Raduga to save the life of Gulabzoy and Watanjar and send them to Tashkent from Bagram Airfield by giving them fake passports. With that and a sealed container in which an almost breathless Sarwari was laying, they came to Tashkent on 19 September.

During the continued investigation in Tashkent, the three were put under surveillance in one of the rooms for as long as four weeks where they were investigated for the reliability of their claims by the KGB. Soon after, they were satisfied with the results and sent them to Bulgaria for a secret retreat. On 9 October, the Soviet secret service had a meeting in which Bogdanov, Gorelov, Pavlonsky and Puzanov were the main chiefs who were discussing what to do with Amin who was very harsh at the meeting. After the two-hour meeting they began to worry that Amin would establish an Islamic republic in Afghanistan and decided to seek a way to put Karmal back in. They brought him and three other ministers secretly to Moscow during which time they discussed how to put him back in power. The decision was to fly him back to Bagram by 13 December. Four days later, Amin's nephew, Asadullah, was taken to Moscow by the KGB for acute food poisoning treatment.

On 19 November 1979, the KGB had a meeting on which they discussed Operation Cascade, which was launched earlier that year. The operation carried out bombings with the help of GRU and FCD. On 27 December, the centre received news that KGB Special Forces Alpha and Zenith Group, supported by the 154th OSN GRU, also known as Muslim battalion and paratroopers from the 345th Independent Guards Airborne Regiment stormed the Tajbeg Palace and killed Amin and his 100–150 personal guards. His 11-year-old son died due to shrapnel wounds. The Soviets installed Karmal as Amin's successor. Several other government buildings were seized during the operation, including the Interior Ministry building, the Internal Security (KHAD) building, and the General Staff building (Darul Aman Palace). Out of the 54 KGB operators that assaulted the palace, 5 were killed in action, including Colonel Grigori Boyarinov, and 32 were wounded. Alpha Group veterans call this operation one of the most successful in the group's history. In June 1981, there were 370 members in the Afghan-controlled KGB intelligence service throughout the nation which were under the command of Ahmad Shah Paiya and had received all the training they need in the Soviet Union. By May 1982, the Ministry of Internal Affairs was set up in Afghanistan under the command of KHAD. In 1983, Boris Voskoboynikov became the next head of the KGB while Leonid Kostromin became his Deputy Minister.

== August 1991 and dissolution ==
The KGB dissolved on December 3, 1991. Its immediate successor agencies were the Federal Security Agency of the RSFSR (AFB), the Inter-Republican Security Service (MSB), the Central Intelligence Service (TsSR), and the Committee for the Protection of the State Border (KOGG). In 1993, the KGB was succeeded overall by the Federal Counterintelligence Service (FSK) of Russia (itself a direct successor to the AFB), which in-turn was succeeded by the Federal Security Service of the Russian Federation (FSB).

== Organisation ==
The Committee for State Security was a militarised organisation adhering to military discipline and regulations. Its operational personnel held army style ranks, except for the maritime branch of the Border troops, which held navy style ranks. The KGB consisted of two main components - organs and troops. The organs included the services directly involved in the committee's main roles - intelligence, counter-intelligence, military counter-intelligence etc. The troops included military units within the KGB's structure, completely separate from the Soviet armed forces - the Border Troops, the Governmental Signals Troops (which in addition to providing communications between the central government and the lower administrative levels, also provided the communications between the General Staff and the military districts), the Special Service Troops (which provided EW, ELINT, SIGINT and cryptography) as well as the Spetsnaz of the KGB (the Kremlin Regiment, Alpha Group, Vympel, etc.). At the time of the Soviet Union's collapse in 1991 the KGB had the following structure:

- Secretariat (office of the Chairman of the KGB) (Секретариат)
- Group of Consultants to the Chairman of the KGB (Группа консультантов при Председателе КГБ)
- Centre for Public Relations (Центр общественных связей)
- 1st Main Directorate (External Intelligence) (1-е Главное управление (внешняя разведка))
- 2nd Main Directorate (Counter-Intelligence) (2-е Главное управление (контрразведка))
- 3rd Main Directorate (Military Counter-Intelligence) (3-е Главное управление (военная контрразведка))
- 4th Directorate (Counter-Intelligence Support for the transport and communications infrastructure) (4-е Управление (контрразведывательное обеспечение объектов транспорта и связи))
- 5th Directorate (Political police)
- 6th Directorate (Counter-Intelligence Support for the economy) (6-е Управление (контрразведывательное обеспечение экономики))
- 7th Directorate (External Surveillance) (7-е Управление (наружное наблюдение))
- 8th Main Directorate (Cryptography) (8-е Главное управление (шифровальное))
- 9th Directorate (Protection of High level party members)
- 10th Department (Inventory and Archive) (10-й отдел (учётно-архивный))
- 12th Department (Wiretapping and surveillance in enclosed spaces) (12-й отдел (прослушивание телефонов и помещений))
- 15th Main Directorate (Wartime government command centres) (15-е Главное управление (обслуживание запасных пунктов управления))
- 16th Directorate (ELINT) (16-е Управление (электронная разведка))
- 17th Directorate (RECON) (Special Reconnaissance in the Field)
- Close Protection Service (Close protection, perimeter protection, transport and catering for high-ranking government officials) (Служба охраны)
- Directorate "Z" (Protection of the constitutional order) (Управление «З» (защита конституционного строя))
- Directorate "OP" (Combat against the organised crime) (Управление «ОП» (борьба с организованной преступностью)
- Directorate "SCh"(Сч) Spetsnaz of the KGB.
- Main Directorate of the Border Troops (Главное управление пограничных войск)
- Analytical Directorate (Аналитическое управление)
- Inspection Directorate (Инспекторское управление)
- Operational Technical Directorate (R&D of special equipment and procedures) (Оперативно-техническое управление)
- Investigative Department (Следственный отдел)
- Directorate of Government Communications (Управление правительственной связи)
- Personnel Directorate (Управление кадров)
- Supply Directorate (Хозяйственное управление)
- Military Construction Directorate (Военно-строительное управление)
- Military Medical Directorate (Военно-медицинское управление)
- Department of Financial Planning (Финансово-плановый отдел)
- Mobilisation Department (Мобилизационный отдел)
- Legal Department and Arbitration (Юридический отдел с арбитражем)

=== Republican affiliations ===
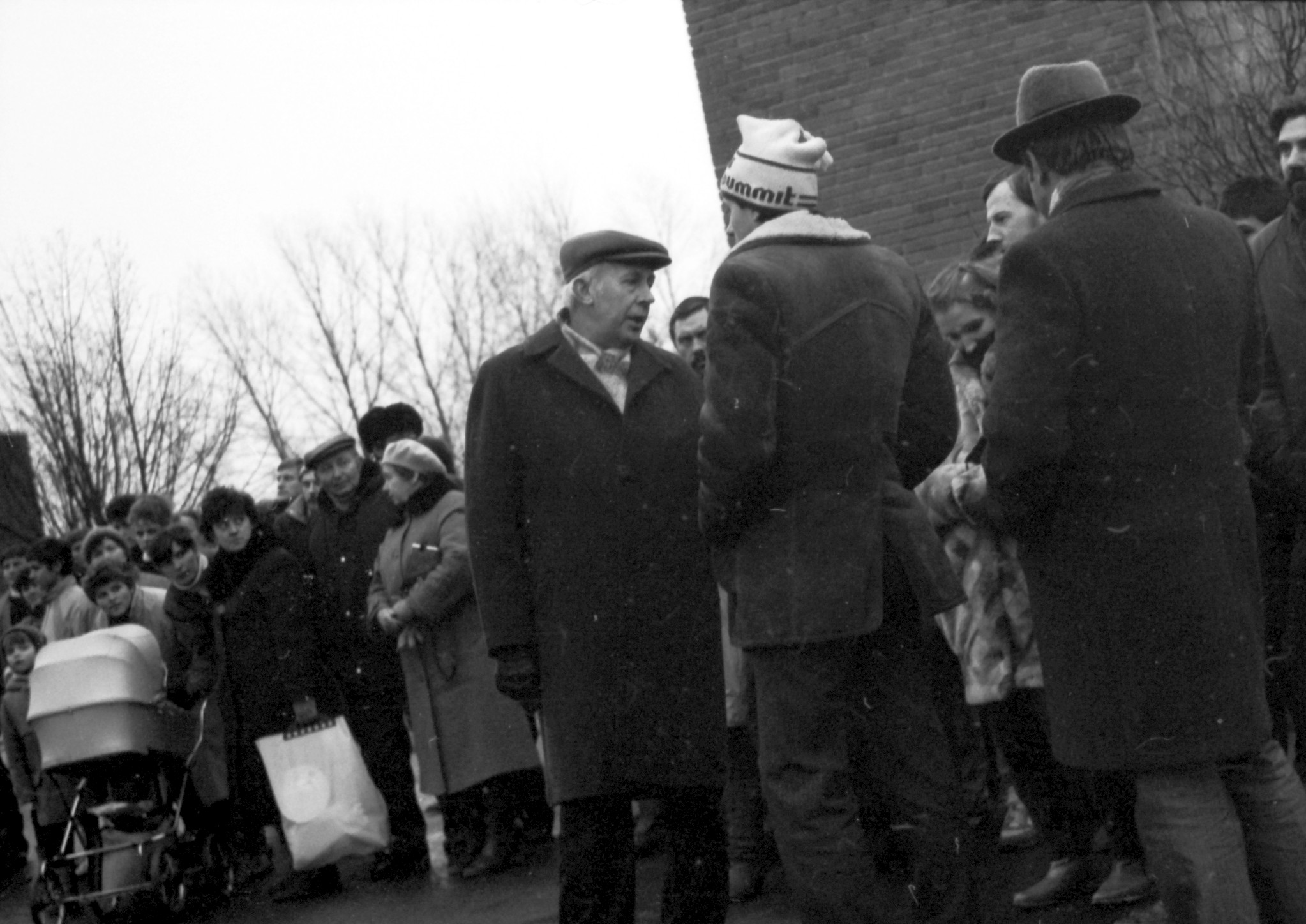
Head of KGB in Lithuania Eduardas Eismuntas, January 1990

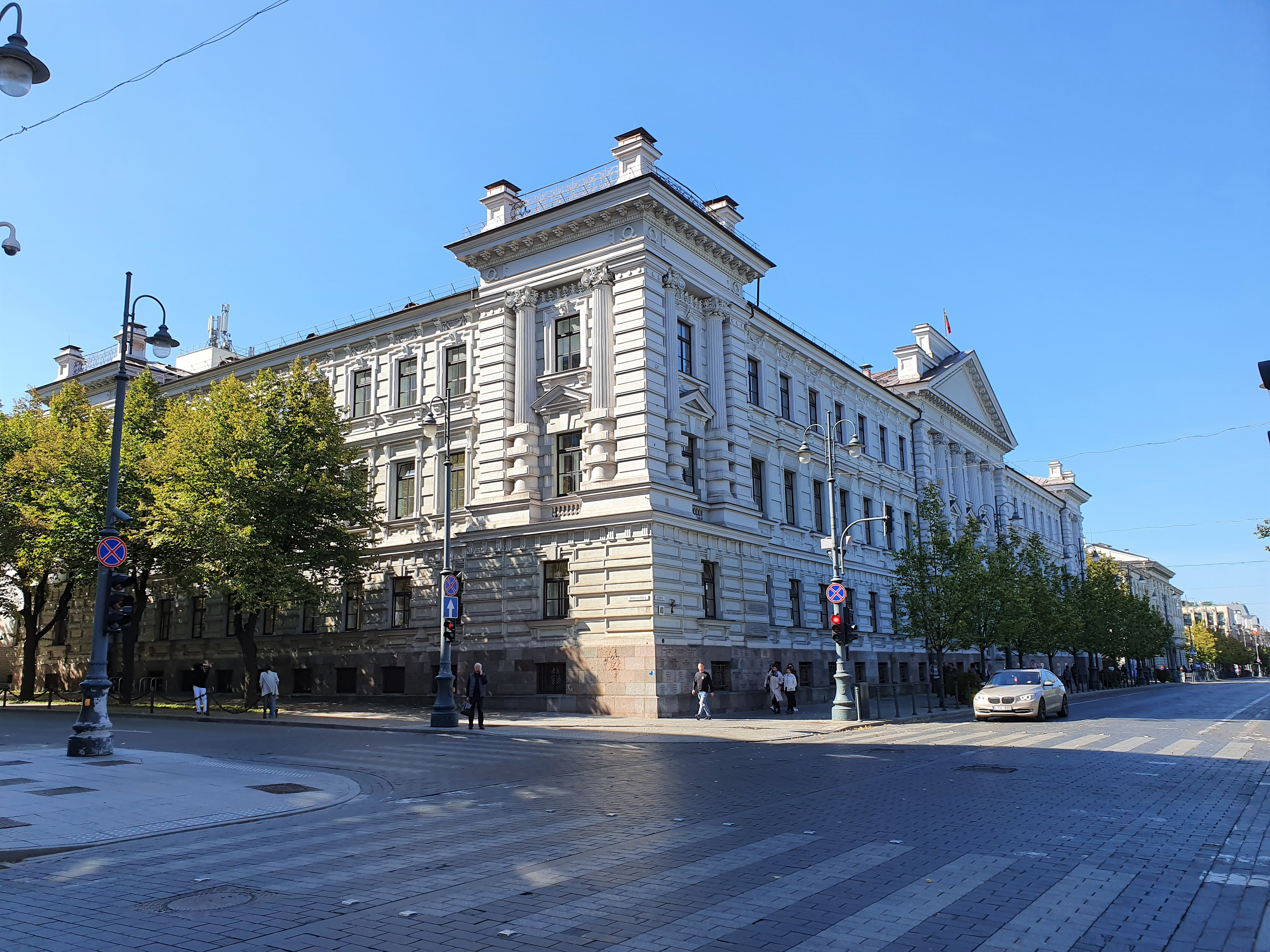
The former building of the KGB in Vilnius, Lithuania

The Soviet Union was a federal state, consisting of 15 constituent Soviet Socialist Republics, each with its own government closely resembling the central government of the USSR. The republican affiliation offices almost completely duplicated the structural organisation of the main KGB.

- KGB of Belarusian SSR / KDB of Belarus (see State Security Committee of the Republic of Belarus)
- KGB of Ukrainian SSR / KDB of Ukraine (see Security Service of Ukraine)
- KGB of Moldovan SSR / CSS of Moldova
- KGB of Estonian SSR / RJK of Estonia
- KGB of Latvian SSR / LPSR Valsts drošības komiteja (VDK)
- KGB of Lithuanian SSR / VSK of Lithuania
- KGB of Georgian SSR / KSU of Georgia
- KGB of Armenian SSR
- KGB of Azerbaijan SSR / DTK of Azerbaijan
- KGB of Kazakh SSR
- KGB of Kyrgyz SSR
- KGB of Uzbek SSR
- KGB of Turkmen SSR
- KGB of Tajik SSR
- KGB of Russian SFSR (created in 1991; see Federal Counterintelligence Service and Federal Security Service)

=== Leadership ===
The Chairman of the KGB, First Deputy Chairmen (1–2), Deputy Chairmen (4–6). Its policy Collegium comprised a chairman, deputy chairmen, directorate chiefs, and republican KGB chairmen.

=== Directorates ===
- First Chief Directorate (Foreign Operations) – foreign espionage (superseded in 1991 by the Foreign Intelligence Service (Russian: Служба внешней разведки, romanized: Sluzhba vneshnej razvedki) or SVR Russian: СВР).
  - Directorate "S" within the First Chief Directorate ran "illegals" — espionage agents operating in foreign countries under deep cover. The "S" stood for "Special" (Russian: Специальное, romanized: Spetsial'noe).
- Second Chief Directorate – counter-intelligence, internal political control.
- Third Chief Directorate (Armed Forces) – military counter-intelligence and armed forces political surveillance.
- Fourth Directorate (Transportation security)
- Fifth Chief Directorate – censorship and internal security against artistic, political, and religious dissension; renamed "Directorate Z", protecting the Constitutional order, in 1989.
- Sixth Directorate (Economic Counter-intelligence, industrial security)
- Seventh Directorate (Surveillance) – of Soviet nationals and foreigners.
- Eighth Chief Directorate – monitored and managed national, foreign, and overseas communications, cryptologic equipment, and research and development.
- Ninth Chief Directorate (Guards and KGB Protection Service) – The 40,000-man uniformed bodyguard for the party leaders and families, guarded critical government installations (nuclear weapons, etc.), operated the Moscow VIP subway, and secure Government–Party telephony. President Yeltsin transformed it to the Federal Protective Service (FPS).
- Fifteenth Directorate (Wartime government command centres)
- Sixteenth Directorate (SIGINT and communications interception) – operated the national and government telephone and telegraph systems.
- Eighteenth Chief Directorate (Investigations) - investigations inside of the Soviet Ministries, preventing corruption and other crimes. Previously named Investigative Department.
- Border Guards Directorate responsible for the Soviet Border Troops.
- Operations and Technology Directorate – research laboratories for recording devices and Laboratory 12 for poisons and drugs.

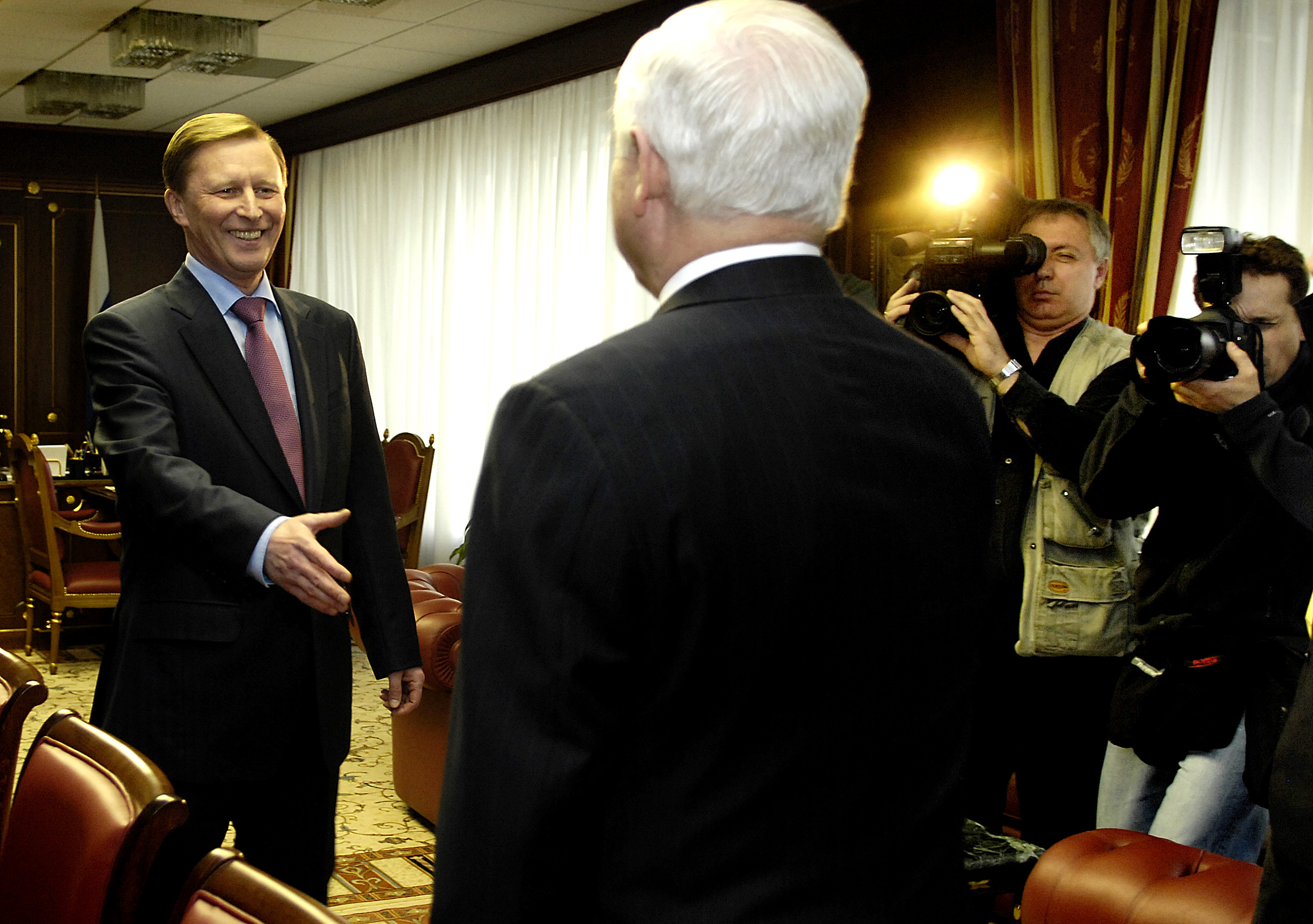
Former KGB officer Sergei Ivanov meets with former CIA director Robert Gates, April 2007.

=== Other units ===
- KGB Personnel Department
- Secretariat of the KGB
- KGB Technical Support Staff
- KGB Finance Department
- KGB Archives
- KGB Irregulars
- Administration Department of the KGB, and
- The CPSU Committee
- KGB Spetsnaz (special operations) units such as:

- Alpha Group
- Vympel Group
- Zenith Group

- Kremlin Guard Force for the Presidium, et al., then became the FSO

=== Mode of operation ===
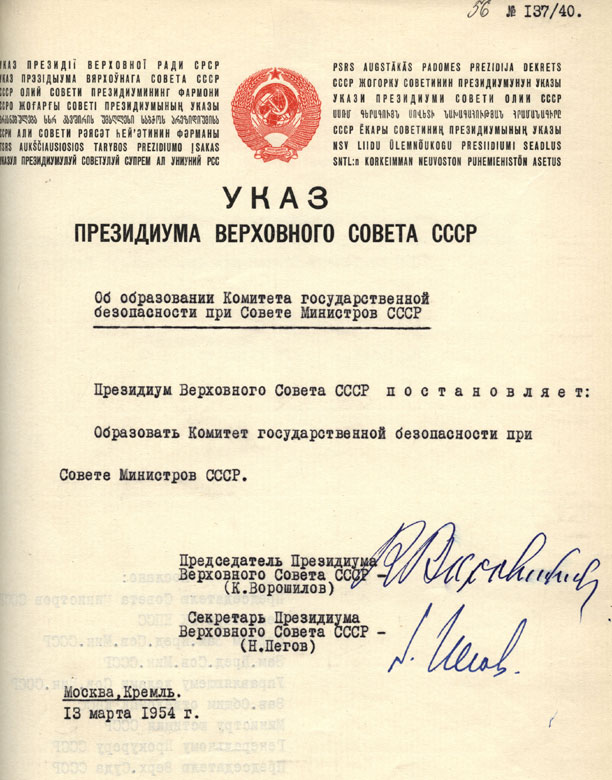
The decree establishing the KGB

A Time magazine article in 1983, reported that the KGB was the world's most effective information-gathering organisation. It operated legal and illegal espionage residencies in target countries where a legal resident gathered intelligence while based at the Soviet embassy or consulate, and, if caught, was protected from prosecution by diplomatic immunity. At worst, the compromised spy was either returned to the Soviet Union or was declared persona non grata and expelled by the government of the target country. The illegal resident spied, unprotected by diplomatic immunity, and worked independently of Soviet diplomatic and trade missions, (cf. the non-official cover CIA officer). In its early history, the KGB valued illegal spies more than legal spies, because illegal spies infiltrated their targets with greater ease. The KGB residency executed four types of espionage: (i) political, (ii) economic, (iii) military-strategic, and (iv) disinformation, effected with "active measures" (PR Line), counter-intelligence and security (KR Line), and scientific–technological intelligence (X Line); quotidian duties included SIGINT (RP Line) and illegal support (N Line).

The KGB classified its spies as:

- agents (a person who provides intelligence) and
- controllers (a person who relays intelligence).

The false-identity (or legend) assumed by a USSR-born illegal spy was elaborate, using the life of either:

- a "live double" (a participant to the fabrications) or
- a "dead double" (whose identity is tailored to the spy).

The agent then substantiated his or her false identity by living in a foreign country before emigrating to the target country. For example, the KGB would send a US-bound illegal resident via the Soviet embassy in Ottawa, Canada.

Tradecraft included stealing and photographing documents, code-names, contacts, targets, and dead letter boxes, and working as a "friend of the cause" or as agents provocateurs, who would infiltrate the target group to sow dissension, influence policy, and arrange kidnappings and assassinations.

== List of chairmen ==
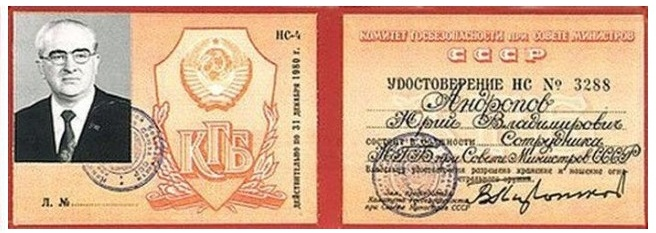
ID card of the Chairman of the KGB Yuri Andropov

Chairman	Dates
Ivan Serov	1954–1958
Konstantin Lunev	act. 1958 (Dec8.–Dec25.)
Alexander Shelepin	1958–1961
Pyotr Ivashutin	act. 1961 (Nov5.–Nov13.)
Vladimir Semichastny	1961–1967
Yuri Andropov	1967–1982
Vitaly Fedorchuk	1982 (May–Dec.)
Viktor Chebrikov	1982–1988
Vladimir Kryuchkov	1988–1991
Leonid Shebarshin	act. 1991 (Aug22.–Aug23.)
Vadim Bakatin	1991 (Aug.–Dec.)

== Commemorative and award badges ==
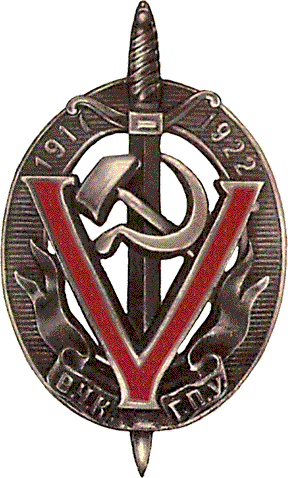
5 years Cheka–OGPU, Honoured Worker of Cheka–OGPU, 1923

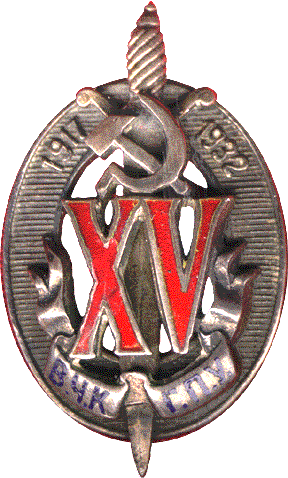
15 years Cheka–OGPU, Honoured Worker of Cheka–OGPU, 1932

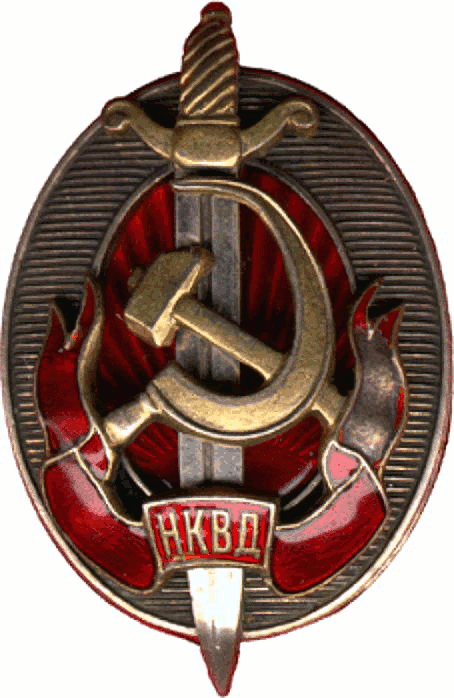
Honoured Worker of NKVD, 1940

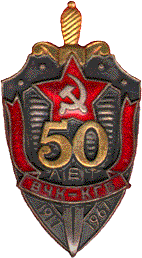
50 years Cheka–KGB, 1967

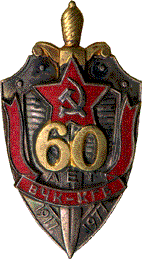
60 years Cheka–KGB, 1977

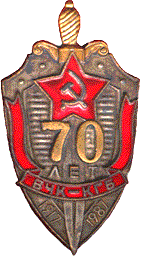
70 years Cheka–KGB, 1987

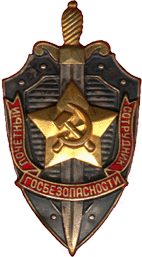
Honoured Worker of State Security, 1957

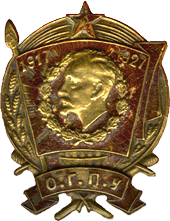
Anniversary Badge 10 years OGPU, 1927

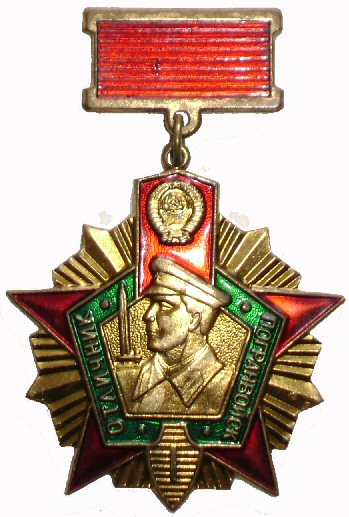
Excellent Border Troop 1st class, 1969

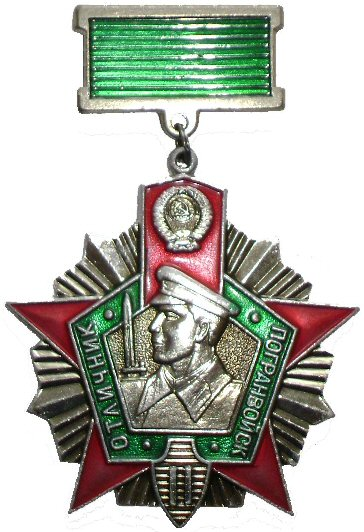
Excellent Border Troop 2nd class, 1969

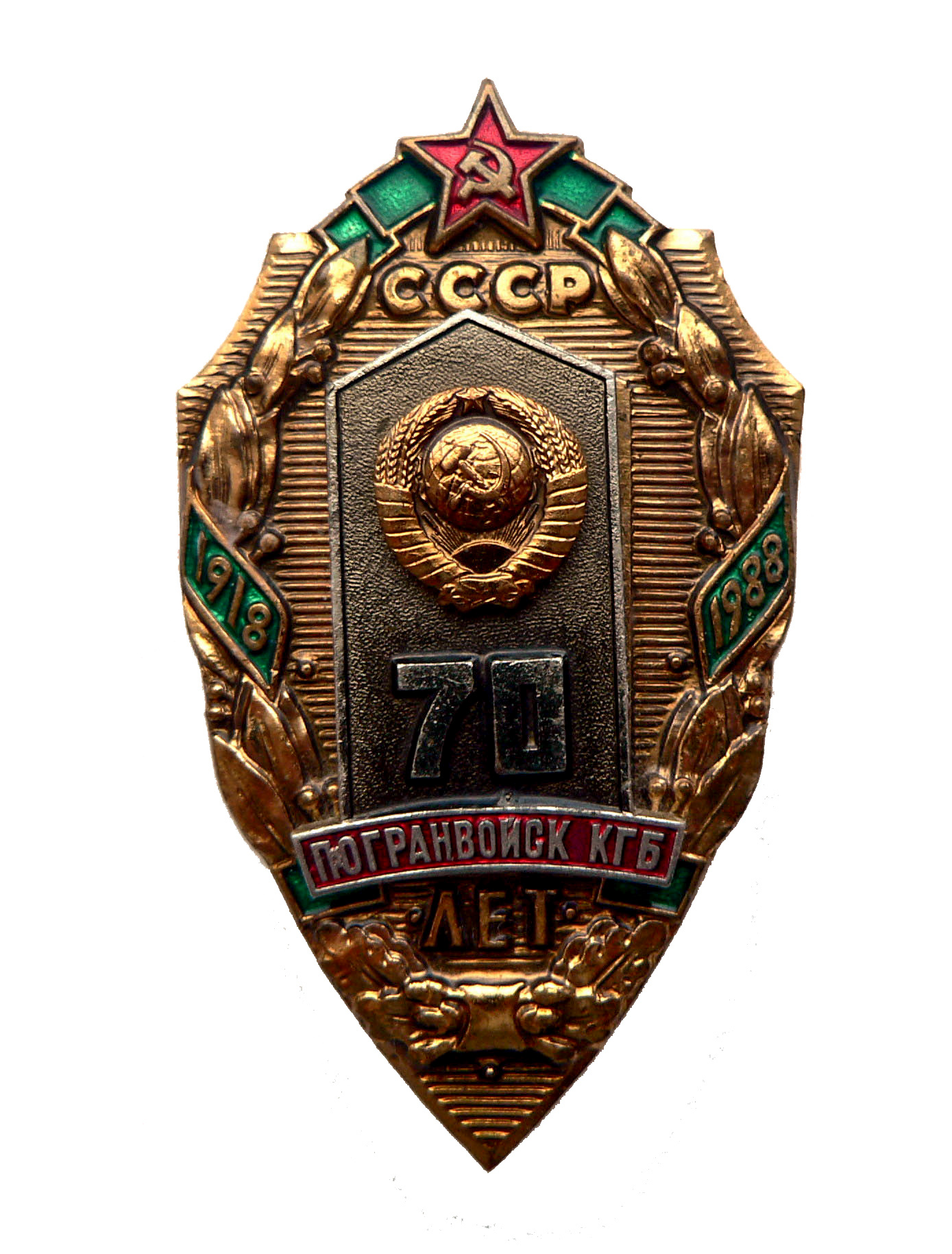
70 years Border Troops KGB, 1988

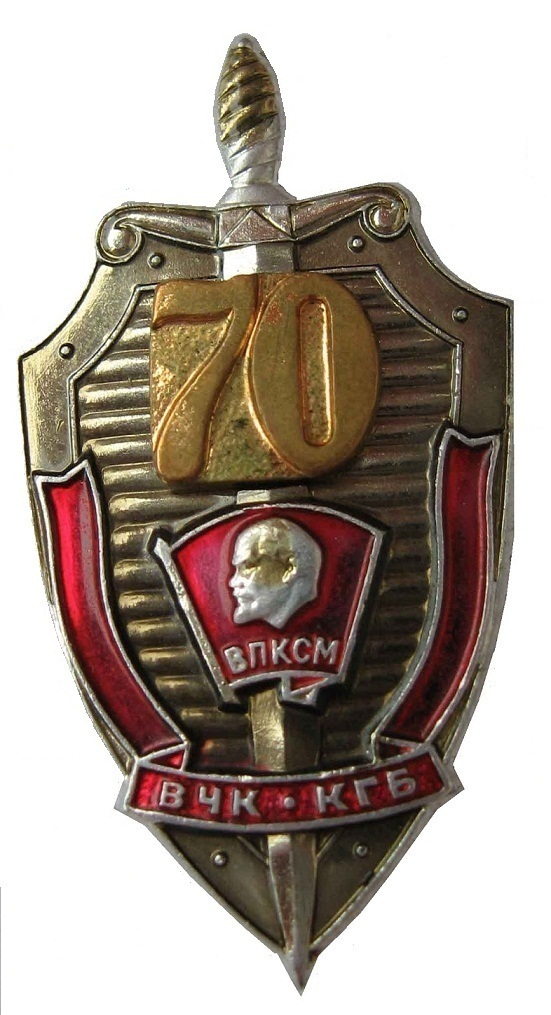
70 years Komsomol Cheka–KGB

== See also ==
- Military ranks of the KGB (1955–1991)
- Belarusian KGB
- Central Social Affairs Department
- Chronology of Soviet secret police agencies
- Department of Homeland Security
- Dirección de Inteligencia
- Eastern Bloc politics
- Federal Agency of Government Communications and Information
- FIA
- History of Soviet espionage
- IB
- ISI
- Ministry of Internal Affairs
- Ministry of Public Security of Laos
- Ministry of Public Security of Vietnam
- Ministry of State Security
- Mitrokhin Archive
- National Directorate of Security (KHAD successor in Afghanistan)
- Numbers station
- RAW
- SMERSH
- Sbornik KGB SSSR
- Security Service of Ukraine
- State Security Department
- Venona project
- World Peace Council

== Sources ==
- Andrew, Christopher; Mitrokhin, Vasili (1999). The Sword and the Shield: The Mitrokhin Archive and the Secret History of the KGB. Basic Books. ISBN 978-0-465-00312-9.
- Christopher Andrew and Vasili Mitrokhin, The Mitrokhin Archive: The KGB in Europe and the West, Gardners Books (2000) ISBN 0-14-028487-7; Basic Books (1999) ISBN 0-465-00310-9; trade (2000) ISBN 0-465-00312-5
- Christopher Andrew and Vasili Mitrokhin, The World Was Going Our Way: The KGB and the Battle for the Third World, Basic Books (2005) ISBN 0-465-00311-7
- John Barron, KGB: The Secret Work of Soviet Secret Agents, Reader's Digest Press (1974) ISBN 0-88349-009-9
- Amy Knight, The KGB: Police and Politics in the Soviet Union, Unwin Hyman (1990) ISBN 0-04-445718-9
- Richard C.S. Trahair and Robert Miller, Encyclopedia of Cold War Espionage, Spies, and Secret Operations, Enigma Books (2009) ISBN 978-1-929631-75-9
