= Nikolai Shchelokov =

Soviet general and statesman (1910–1984)

- Shchelokov in 1973

Minister of Internal Affairs (Note: As Minister of Public Order Protection until 25 November 1968)
- In office 17 September 1966 – 17 December 1982
- President: Nikolai Podgorny (Note: As Chairman of the Presidium of the Supreme Soviet.); Leonid Brezhnev; Vasili Kuznetsov
- Prime Minister: Alexei Kosygin; Nikolai Tikhonov
- Preceded by: Office reestablished
- Succeeded by: Vitaly Fedorchuk

Personal details
- Born: Nikolai Anisimovich Shchelokov; 26 November 1910 Almazna, Bakhmutsky Uyezd, Yekaterinoslav Governorate, Russian Empire
- Died: 13 December 1984 (aged 74) Serebryany Bor, Russian SFSR, Soviet Union
- Resting place: Vagankovo Cemetery, Moscow
- Party: Communist Party of the Soviet Union (1931–1984)
- Education: Dzerzhinsky Metallurgical Institute

Military service
- Allegiance: Soviet Union
- Branch/service: Red Army; MVD
- Years of service: 1941–1946; 1967–1984
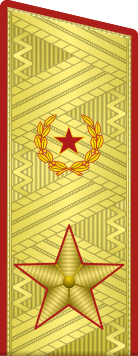
- Rank: Army General
- Battles/wars: World War II

Nikolai Anisimovich Shchelokov (Note: Russian: Николай Анисимович Щёлоков; Ukrainian: Микола Онисимович Щолоков) (26 November [O.S. 13 November] 1910 – 13 December 1984) was a Soviet statesman and army general who served sixteen years as Minister of Internal Affairs from 17 September 1966 to 17 December 1982. He was fired from all posts on corruption charges and committed suicide on 13 December 1984.

== Early life and education ==
Shchelokov was born in Almazna, a large Cossack village near Luhansk in Donbas region of Russian Empire, on 26 November 1910.

His father was a mine worker, and Shchelokov himself began working in the mines when he was sixteen years old. He attended Dzerzhinsky Metallurgical Institute and received a bachelor's degree in metallurgical engineering in 1933.

== Career ==
=== Communist Party ===
Shchelokov joined the Communist Party of the Soviet Union in 1931. In 1938, he was appointed first secretary of its committee in the Krasnogvardeysky district of Dnipropetrovsk. From 1939 to 1941 he was the chairman of the Dnipropetrovsk City Soviet under Leonid Brezhnev who was the first secretary of the Dnipropetrovsk Oblast. Since then, Brezhnev and Shchelokov forged very strong ties and continued supporting each other in their political careers until Brezhnev's death.

=== World War II ===
At the start of World War II, Shchelokov was promoted to the rank of commissar in the Red Army while remaining the chairman of the City Soviet of Dnipropetrovsk. He served as a political commissar in the army from 1941 to 1946.

=== Brezhnev's clan ===
After the war, Shchelokov resumed to work as a politician in Ukraine from 1947 to 1951. He was part of the Dnipropetrovsk Mafia, consisting of several allies to Brezhnev, including Andrei Kirilenko and Volodymyr Shcherbytsky, when Brezhnev was head of the Dnipropetrovsk Oblast party committee, or obkom. Following the appointment of Brezhnev as the first secretary of the Communist Party of Moldavia, Shchelokov followed him, becoming second secretary and Brezhnev's de facto deputy in 1951, and he was also named first deputy premier of the Moldavian Soviet Socialist Republic. In the same period, he became a member in the Supreme Soviet.

=== Chief of the Soviet Police (1966–1982) ===
Shchelokov was appointed by Brezhnev as minister of public order on 17 September 1966. On 25 November 1968, the Ministry of Public Order (MOOP) was renamed as Ministry of Internal Affairs (MVD) with the title of Shchelokov's office renamed accordingly. He was promoted to the rank of general on 12 September 1976, while serving as interior minister. He was also the Soviet Union's top police officer. One of Shchelokov's deputies at the ministry was Brezhnev's son-in-law, Yuri Churbanov.

=== Downfall ===
Five weeks after the death of Brezhnev, on 17 December 1982, Shchelokov was replaced as interior minister by KGB chairman Vitaly Fedorchuk, a measure seen as influenced by Yuri Andropov, Fedorchuk's predecessor as head of the KGB and newly elected general secretary of the Communist Party as well as an opponent of the Dnipropetrovsk Mafia. Shchelokov's dismissal was due to corruption charges against him.

After leaving office, Shchelokov began work as chief of a police unit at a gas pipeline construction site in Siberia. On 15 June 1983, he was dismissed from the central committee of the Communist Party on allegations of corruption during his tenure, as part of Andropov's anti-corruption campaign. His son Igor was also removed from his post in the Komsomol shortly after. Later reports argued that his wife and son had also been involved in illegal acts of selling and buying foreign cars. It was further argued that Shchelokov spent huge amounts of state money to buy luxury items for personal use. On 6 November 1984, his military rank of army general was withdrawn by the state, and on 7 December he was expelled from the Communist Party. In 1988, author Raul M. Mir-Haidarov argued that Shchelokov had been the godfather of the Uzbek mob.

== Death ==
Shchelokov committed suicide by gunshot to his head using his own hunting rifle from his collection of rarities at his suburban mansion in Serebryany Bor on 13 December 1984. He was buried on 15 December in Vagankovo cemetery in Moscow. His wife Svetlana predeceased him having committed suicide on 19 February 1983.

== Honours and awards ==
Shchelokov was awarded the followings: the Order of Lenin (three times), the Order of the Red Banner (twice), the Order of Bogdan Khmelnitsky (Second Class), the Order of the Patriotic War (First Class), the Order of the Red Banner of Labour, the Order of the Red Star, Hero of Socialist Labour and various medals.

Shchelokov was stripped of all civilian awards and honors on 12 December 1984.

=== Soviet ===
| Hero of Socialist Labour (25 November 1980) |
| Order of Lenin, four times (19 June 1965, 30 April 1966, 25 November 1970, 25 November 1980) |
| Order of the October Revolution (5 January 1978) |
| Order of the Red Banner, twice (14 April 1945,?) |
| Order of Bogdan Khmelnitsky, 2nd class (29 June 1965) |
| Order of the Patriotic War, 1st class (16 October 1943) |
| Order of the Red Banner of Labour (23 January 1948) |
| Order of the Red Star (22 May 1943) |
| Medal "For Courage" (31 January 1943) |
| Medal "For the Defence of the Caucasus" (1944) |
| Medal "For the Capture of Vienna" (1945) |
| Medal "For the Victory over Germany in the Great Patriotic War 1941–1945" (1945) |
| Medal "For Valiant Labour in the Great Patriotic War 1941–1945" (1945) |
| Medal "For Distinction in Guarding the State Border of the USSR" |
| Medal "For Excellent Service in the Protection of Public Order", four times |
| Medal "For Courage in a Fire" |
| Jubilee Medal "Twenty Years of Victory in the Great Patriotic War 1941-1945" (1965) |
| Jubilee Medal "Thirty Years of Victory in the Great Patriotic War 1941–1945" (1975) |
| Jubilee Medal "In Commemoration of the 100th Anniversary of the Birth of Vladimir Ilyich Lenin" (1969) |
| Medal "Veteran of the Armed Forces of the USSR" (1976) |
| Medal "For the Development of Virgin Lands" (1956) |
| Jubilee Medal "50 Years of the Armed Forces of the USSR" (1967) |
| Jubilee Medal "60 Years of the Armed Forces of the USSR" (1978) |
| Jubilee Medal "50 Years of the Soviet Militia" (1967) |
| Medal "For Impeccable Service", 1st class |

- Badge "Honored Worker of the Ministry of Internal Affairs"

=== Foreign ===
| Military Order of the White Lion "For Victory", 2nd class (Czechoslovakia) |
| War Cross 1939–1945 (Czechoslovakia) |
| Military Commemorative Medal with 'USSR' clasp (Czechoslovakia) |
| Patriotic Order of Merit in gold (East Germany) |
| Order of Sukhbaatar (Mongolia) |
| Order of Military Merit, twice (Mongolia) |
| Medal "50 Years of the Mongolian People's Revolution" (Mongolia) |
| Commander's Cross with Star of the Order of Polonia Restituta (Poland) |
| Cross of Valour (Poland) |
