= Mishnevo =

Mishnevo Мишнево
- Village
- Location within Vladimir Oblast Location within Russia
- Coordinates: 56°16′N 40°59′E
- Country: Russia
- Region: Vladimir Oblast
- District: Kameshkovsky District
- Time zone: UTC+3:00

Mishnevo (Russian: Мишнево) is a rural locality (a village) in Vtorovskoye Rural Settlement, Kameshkovsky District, Vladimir Oblast, Russia. The population was 72 as of 2010. There is 1 street.

== Geography ==
Mishnevo is located 10 km south of Kameshkovo (the district's administrative centre) by road. Istomino is the nearest rural locality.
