= Vitaly Fedorchuk =

Ukrainian Soviet security and intelligence officer and politician

- Виталий Федорчук

Minister of Internal Affairs
- In office 17 December 1982 – 25 January 1986
- Preceded by: Nikolai Shchelokov
- Succeeded by: Alexander Vlasov

5th Chairman of the KGB
- In office 26 May 1982 – 17 December 1982
- Premier: Nikolai Tikhonov
- Preceded by: Yuri Andropov
- Succeeded by: Viktor Chebrikov

Chairman of the KGB of the Ukrainian SSR
- In office July 16, 1970 – May 26, 1982
- Preceded by: Vitali Nikitchenko
- Succeeded by: Stepan Mukha

Personal details
- Born: Vitaly Vasilyevich Fedorchuk; 27 December 1918 Ogievka, Kiev Governorate, Ukrainian People's Republic
- Died: 29 February 2008 (aged 89) Moscow, Russian Federation
- Resting place: Troyekurovskoye Cemetery, Moscow
- Party: Communist Party of the Soviet Union (1936–1991)

Military service
- Allegiance: Soviet Union
- Branch/service: NKVD; MGB; KGB
- Years of service: 1936–1991
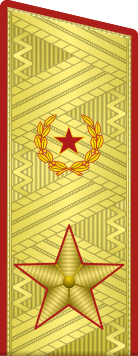
- Rank: Army General
- Battles/wars: Soviet–Japanese border conflicts; Battles of Khalkhin Gol; World War II; Eastern Front

Vitaly Vasilyevich Fedorchuk (Russian: Виталий Васильевич Федорчук; Ukrainian: Віталій Васильович Федорчук, romanized: Vitalii Vasylovych Fedorchuk; 27 December 1918 – 29 February 2008) was a Soviet security and intelligence officer and politician who served as Chairman of the Committee for State Security of the Ukrainian Soviet Socialist Republic from 1970 to 1982 and then Minister of Internal Affairs from 1982 to 1986.

== Early life and education ==
Born in 1918 to a poor Ukrainian peasant family in the village of Ogievka, located in the Zhitomir region of Ukraine, Fedorchuk started working at a local newspaper at the age of 16. He was called up for military service in 1936 and graduated from the Military Signals and Communications School in Kyiv. Initially a signals officer in the Red Army, in 1939 he was recruited by the NKVD as a full-time operative.

== Security and intelligence officer ==
At the beginning of his career as a state security officer, Fedorchuk was assigned to the Mongolia, where he fought in the victorious Battle of Khalkhin Gol against the Japanese Army. He then served as special assistant to the operational commissar of the Special Department of the NKVD of the Urals Military District. After the start of the Great Patriotic War, he became deputy chief of the Special Department of the NKVD attached to the 82nd Motorized Rifle Division of the Red Army and then, from 1942 to 1943, he was chief of the Special Department of the NKVD attached to the Armor Brigades on the North Caucasus Front. Between 1943 and 1949 he served as deputy chief of military counterintelligence (SMERSH) in Yaroslavl.

In 1949 he was assigned as a military counterintelligence officer on the Central Group of Forces in Soviet-occupied Austria. Then he worked in East Germany and again in Austria (since 1955 free from military occupation), in the Soviet Embassy in Vienna, until 1967, under diplomatic cover. In 1967, he was appointed Director of the Third Directorate (military counterintelligence) of the KGB where he served until 1970.

For a period of 12 years, between 18 July 1970 and 26 May 1982, Fedorchuk served as Chairman of the Ukrainian KGB, serving under First Secretary Volodymyr Shcherbystky. In this capacity, he led a fierce suppression of Ukrainian nationalism. The Ukrainian human rights activist Viacheslav Chornovil was twice arrested and sentenced to long terms in prison during Fedorchuk's tenure.

He was appointed Chairman of the KGB on 26 May 1982, replacing Yuri Andropov, and served for seven months until 17 December 1982. When he was appointed, many KGB officials did not have uniforms, and wore civilian clothes at work. Fedorchuk ruled that they must all have three uniforms: one for everyday, one for work outside the office, and one for parades and festivals.

He then became the Soviet Interior Minister in December 1982, replacing Brezhnev's man Nikolai Shchelokov, who had been dismissed on corruption charges as part of Andropov's purge of his predecessor's associates. His term ended in January 1986 (Mikhail Gorbachev had him replaced due to his opposition to the policies of the new Soviet leadership) and he was succeeded by Alexander V. Vlasov. After leaving the Interior Ministry, Fedorchuk became an Inspector at the Ministry of Defense, a largely honorary post, and then, he retired.

== Death and burial ==
Fedorchuk died in Moscow on 29 February 2008 at the age of 89. His body was buried at Moscow's Troyekurovskoye Cemetery.

Government offices
| Preceded by Vitaliy Nikitchenko | Chairman of the Committee for State Security of the Ukrainian SSR; 1970-1982 | Succeeded by Stepan Mukha |
| Preceded by Yuri Andropov | Chairman of KGB; 1982 | Succeeded by Viktor Chebrikov |
