= Vadim Bakatin =

Russian politician (1937–2022)

- Вадим Бакатин
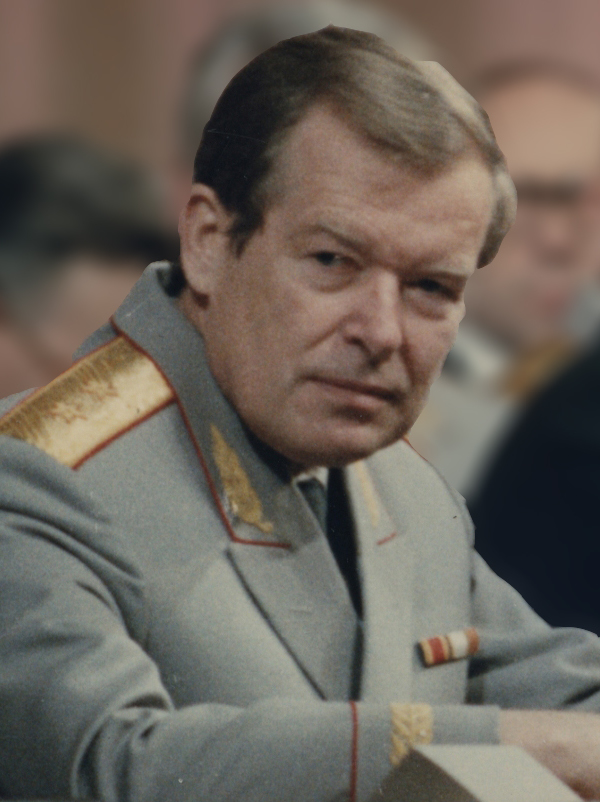
- Bakatin in 1988

Leader of the Inter-Republican Security Service of the USSR
- In office 6 November 1991 – 15 January 1992
- Premier: Ivan Silayev
- Preceded by: Post established
- Succeeded by: Post abolished

Chairman of the KGB
- In office 29 August 1991 – 3 December 1991
- Premier: Ivan Silayev
- Preceded by: Leonid Shebarshin
- Succeeded by: Post abolished

Minister of Interior of the Soviet Union
- In office 20 October 1988 – 1 December 1990
- Premier: Nikolai Ryzhkov
- Preceded by: Alexander Vlasov
- Succeeded by: Boris Pugo

Personal details
- Born: 6 November 1937 Kiselyovsk, Kemerovo Oblast, Soviet Union
- Died: 31 July 2022 (aged 84) Moscow, Russia
- Party: Communist Party of the Soviet Union (1964–1991)
- Education: Novosibirsk Institute of Civil Engineering

Military service
- Allegiance: Soviet Union
- Branch/service: MVD; KGB; MSB
- Years of service: 1988–1991
- Rank: Lieutenant general

Vadim Viktorovich Bakatin (Russian: Вадим Викторович Бакатин; 6 November 1937 – 31 July 2022) was a Russian politician who served as the last chairman of the KGB in 1991. He was the last surviving former chairman of this organization. He was appointed to dismantle the KGB, but he was unable to control this organization and to fulfill the task due to political reasons. However, he was able to fulfill a plan to disintegrate the intelligence agency into separate organizations. He ran for the Russian presidency as an independent candidate in the June 1991 election.

== Early life and education ==
Vadim Bakatin was born in Kiselyovsk, Kemerovo Oblast, in 1937. He graduated from the Novosibirsk Civil Engineering Institute and the Academy of Social Sciences under the CPSU Central Committee.

== Career ==
From 1960 to 1971, Bakatin was supervisor, chief engineer, and director of construction works. From 1964 to 1991, he was the member of the Communist Party of the Soviet Union. From 1986 to 1990, he served as a member of the CPSU Central Committee. Bakatin was appointed Minister of Interior of the Soviet Union in 1988, replacing Alexander Vlasov. Bakatin's tenure lasted until 1990. In 1991, he was made the head of KGB. Eventually, he was able to disintegrate the KGB, dismiss Fourth Department of the Chief Directorate "З", Fifth Chief Directorate, the actual political police apparatus that ran the secret informants, political dossiers, and dissident-hunting machinery.

After the disintegration of the KGB, he served as head of the Inter-republican Security Service of the Soviet Union.

Bakatin had been put forth as a candidate for the Communist Party's nomination for the 1990 Soviet Union presidential election. However, he decided not to compete.

In 1991, Vadim Bakatin as Chief of the KGB revealed to the U.S. ambassador Robert Schwarz Strauss to the Soviet Union the methods that had been used to install covert listening devices in the building that had been intended to replace Spaso House as the American embassy in Moscow. Strauss reported that this revelation was made from a sense of cooperation and goodwill, with "no strings attached". Bakatin's action was met with harsh criticism, including allegations of treason which were eventually retracted.

In 1992, Bakatin was appointed vice-president and director of the Department of Political and International Relations of the international "Reforma" fund. From 1997 on, Bakatin was a director/advisor of Baring Vostok (Moscow).

== 1991 presidential campaign ==
Bakatin was a candidate in the 1991 Russian presidential election. His running mate was Ramazan Abdulatipov. He ultimately placed last in the election out of six candidates, receiving 2,719,757 votes (3.5% of the votes cast).

== Personal life ==
Vadim Bakatin, his grandson, (born 24 June 1998) was an international football player and played for AS Monaco FC at youth level.

Bakatin died on 31 July 2022 at a hospital in Moscow, Russia, at the age of 84.

== Quotes ==
The traditions of chekism must be eradicated, must cease to exist as an ideology.

Government offices
Preceded by Leonid Shebarshin (acting)	Head of Soviet Committee of State Security; 1991	Succeeded by office disestablished
