= Ministry of Internal Affairs (Soviet Union) =

Soviet government ministry

- Министерство внутренних дел СССР; Ministerstvo vnutrennih del SSSR
- Badge of the Ministry of Internal Affairs

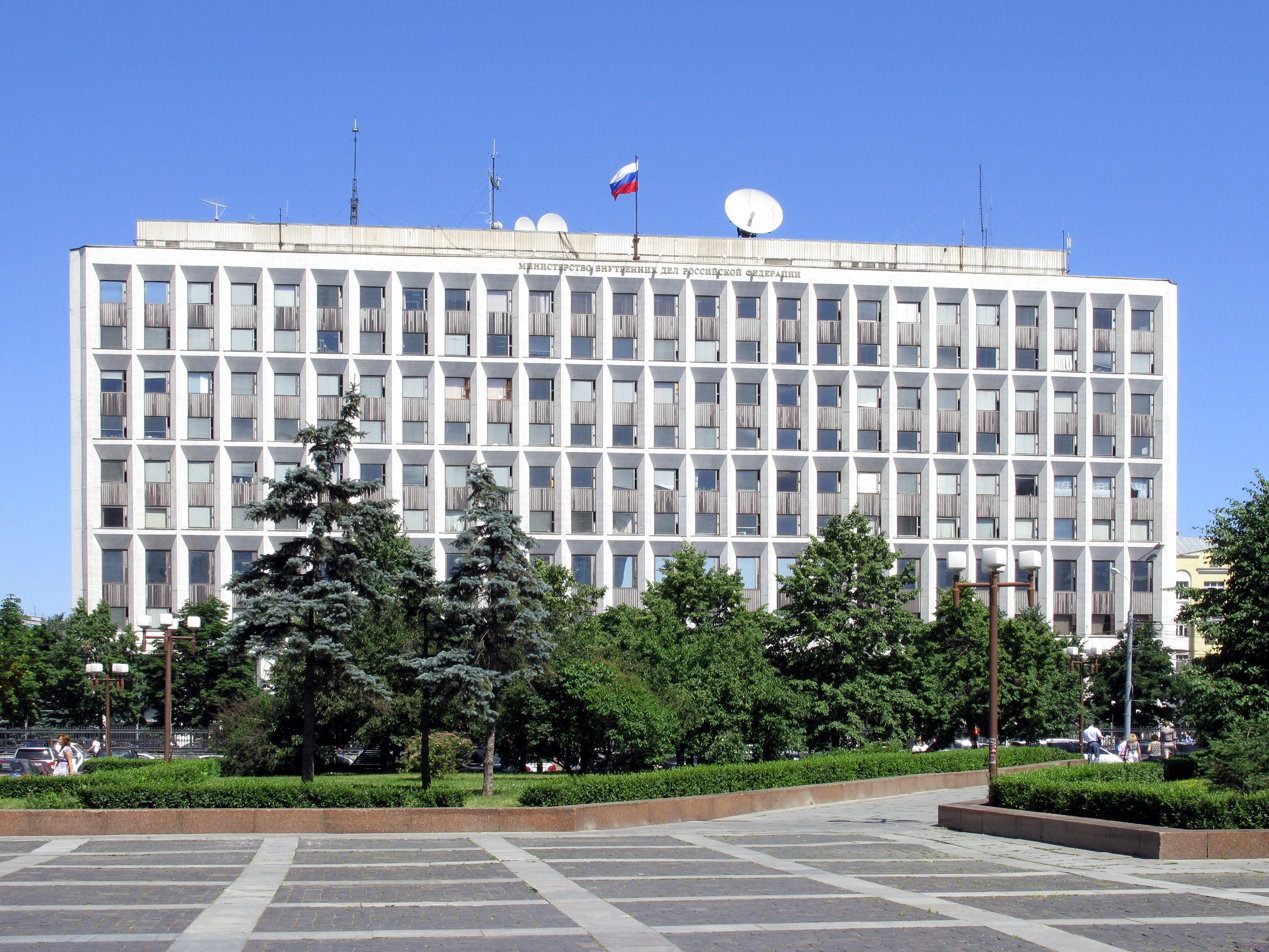
- Ministry of Internal Affairs headquarters in Moscow

Agency overview
- Formed: 15 March 1946; 80 years ago
- Preceding agency: NKVD (1934–1946)
- Dissolved: 26 December 1991; 34 years ago
- Superseding agencies: Ministry of Internal Affairs of Russia; Ministry of Internal Affairs of Ukraine; Ministry of Internal Affairs of Belarus; Ministry of Internal Affairs of Kazakhstan; Ministry of Internal Affairs of Georgia; Ministry of Internal Affairs of Azerbaijan
- Type: Interior ministry Secret police and Intelligence agency (1953-1954)
- Jurisdiction: Soviet Union
- Headquarters: Zhitnaya St. 16, Moscow, Russian SFSR, Soviet Union; 55°43′51″N 37°36′50″E
- Minister responsible: Minister of Interior
- Child agencies: Militsiya; Traffic Safety; Internal Troops

The Ministry of Internal Affairs of the USSR (MVD; Russian: Министерство внутренних дел СССР (МВД), romanized: Ministerstvo vnutrennikh del SSSR) was the interior ministry of the Soviet Union from 1946 to 1991. The MVD was established as the successor to the NKVD during the reform of the People's Commissariats into the Ministries of the Soviet Union in 1946 as part of a broader restructuring of the government. The MVD did not include agencies concerned with secret policing unlike the NKVD, with the function being assigned to the Ministry of State Security (MGB), which had been established during the Second World War. The MVD and MGB were briefly merged into a single ministry from March 1953 until the MGB was split off as the Committee for State Security (KGB) in March 1954.

This resulted in a system where one agency was responsible for domestic and foreign intelligence gathering, espionage, surveillance and secret police functions, and another responsible for the regular civilian police forces, fire departments and internal security troops. The MVD was headed by the Minister of Internal Affairs and responsible for many internal services in the Soviet Union such as the Militsiya, the national police force, the Internal Troops, which served as the USSR's national gendarmerie, the OMON riot control units, Traffic Safety, prisons, the Gulag system as well as the successive penal colonies, and the internal migration system. From 1966-1968, it was briefly known as the Ministry of Public Order Protection. The MVD was dissolved upon the dissolution of the Soviet Union in December 1991 and succeeded by its branches in the post-Soviet states, the largest being the Russian MVD, which inherited its predecessor's functions, though its Internal Troops would later become their own independent service - the National Guard.

== History ==
The Soviet police was established on the third day after the October Revolution – November 10, 1917, as a body of revolutionary order. During the first months of Soviet power the workers' militia formed on a voluntary basis. They served both as an armed force and an organ of public order. On 10 May 1918 the Cheka decided: "The police are there as a permanent staff of the persons executing special functions, the organization of the militia should be carried out irrespective of the organization of the Red Army, their functions must be strictly separated".

The formation of the Internal Security bodies of the Russian Socialist Republic was completed in May 1922. The "Regulations on the People's Commissariat of Internal Affairs of the Soviet Russia" defined the structure of the Commissariat and other law-enforcement bodies along with their rights and responsibilities.

The Ministry of Internal Affairs of the USSR was created on 15 March 1946 from the People's Commissariat for Internal Affairs (NKVD), the interior ministry of the Soviet Union since 1934, when all the People's Commissariats (the Soviet equivalent to a government ministry) were rebranded and transformed into the Ministries of the Soviet Union. The main change was the removal of secret police functions, as the responsibilities of the Main Directorate of State Security of the NKVD were transferred to the new Ministry of State Security (MGB) as a completely separate ministry.

On 15 March 1953, the MGB was incorporated into the MVD, re-creating a structure similar to the NKVD, but just under a year later on 13 March 1954 the MGB's functions were again transferred to a separate state committee, the Committee for State Security (KGB).

The MVD was originally established as a union-republic ministry with headquarters in Moscow, but in 1960 the Soviet leadership under Nikita Khrushchev, as part of its general downgrading of the police, abolished the central MVD, whose functions were assumed by republic ministries of internal affairs. On August 30, 1962, the Presidium of the Supreme Soviet of the RSFSR reorganized the Republican Ministry of Internal Affairs into the Ministry of Public Order Protection of the RSFSR (Министерство охраны общественного порядка (МООП); Ministerstvo okhrany obshchestvennogo poriadka — MOOP). The same was done in all Union and autonomous republics of the Soviet Union. This name change implied a break with the all-powerful MVD created by Lavrentiy Beria, as well as a narrower range of functions. The changes were accompanied by increasing criticism of the regular police, the militsiya, in the Soviet press for its shortcomings in combating crime. Accordingly, the Internal Troops of the Soviet Union were distributed among the Union Republics and are subordinated to the republican ministries of internal affairs on a regional basis.

Following Khrushchev's ouster in 1964, his successor Leonid Brezhnev did much to raise the status of the regular police. In 1966, after placing one of his proteges, Nikolai Shchelokov, in the post of chief, Brezhnev reinstated MOOP as a union-republic ministry called Ministry of Public Order Protection of the Soviet Union, formally by Decree of the Presidium of the Supreme Soviet of the USSR issued on July 26, 1966. Two years later, on November 25, 1968 MOOP was renamed the MVD, an apparent symbol of its increased authority.

In 1971, a laser was used to solve a crime (after the arrest of two suspects, they were found to have 17 wristwatch mechanisms in their home... the suspects claimed that these were just a collection of old watch details, but a laser analysis in Moscow revealed that they were actually stolen gold watches without their gold cases, as these criminals had already removed, melted, and sold all the gold parts).

In 1980, a first criminal offense in the USSR was solved with the help of a computer (a VAZ-2101 car that hit a pedestrian on the Moscow Highway in Tomsk and fled the scene was found as a result of a comprehensive analysis of all the traces left behind). In the period up to October 17, 1980 alone, computers were used to successfully solve more than 50 various crimes.

Efforts were made to raise the effectiveness of the MVD by recruiting better-qualified personnel and upgrading equipment and training. Brezhnev's death in 1982, however, left the MVD vulnerable to his opponents, Yuri Andropov in particular. Just a month after Brezhnev died, Shchelokov was ousted as its chief and replaced by the former KGB chairman, Vitaly Fedorchuk. Shchelokov was later tried on corruption charges. A similar fate befell Brezhnev's son-in-law, Yuri Churbanov, who was removed from the post of first deputy chief in 1984 and later arrested on criminal charges. After bringing several officials from the KGB and from the CPSU apparatus into the MVD, Andropov sought to make it an effective organization for rooting out widespread corruption; Mikhail Gorbachev continued these efforts.

In January 1986, when Fedorchuk was retired, Aleksandr Vlasov was appointed the chief of the MVD despite having no background in the police apparatus. In September 1988, Vlasov became a candidate member of the CPSU Politburo, and the following month he was replaced as chief of the MVD by Vadim Bakatin. Reforms initiated by Gorbachev met opposition by hardliners in government and the party, especially the security apparatus. Interior minister Boris Pugo was one of the main organizers of the 1991 Soviet coup d'état attempt, and when the coup failed, he killed himself. Pugo was replaced by Viktor Barannikov, who acted as the final interior minister of the Soviet Union. The MVD was effectively dissolved upon the dissolution of the Soviet Union on 26 December 1991, though its branches in the various Soviet republics have survived as the interior ministries of the now-independent Post-Soviet states.

== Functions and organization ==
The MVD had a wide array of duties related to the internal functions and security of the Soviet Union. It was responsible for uncovering and investigating certain categories of crime, apprehending criminals, supervising the internal passport system, maintaining public order, combating public intoxication, supervising parolees, managing prisons and labor camps, providing fire protection, and controlling traffic. Until early 1988, the MVD was also in charge of special psychiatric hospitals, but a law passed in January 1988 transferred all psychiatric hospitals to the authority of the Ministry of Health. From 1946 until 1991, it had under its command a large paramilitary gendarmerie-like force known as the MVD Internal Troops (VV SSSR). These were aligned with the Soviet Armed Forces, but under MVD control, and effectively served as its armed wing. Internal Troops units were organized along the lines of conventional motor rifle units, and used the same recruiting system as the Ground Forces. Their main role was to serve as a riot police, crowd control counter-insurgency and internal security force; Internal Troops units were dispersed throughout the country, with most being a battalion size. In larger cities, units were usually at a regiment level due to the larger population size.

== Structure ==
As a union-republic ministry under the Council of Ministers, the MVD had its headquarters in Moscow and branches in the republic and regional government apparatus, as well as in oblasts and cities. Unlike the KGB, the internal affairs apparatus was subject to dual subordination: local internal-affairs offices reported both to the executive committees of their respective local Soviets and to their superior offices in the MVD hierarchy.

The MVD headquarters in Moscow was divided into several directorates and offices:

- The Directorate for Combating the Embezzlement of Socialist Property and Speculation investigated white-collar crime such as embezzlement and falsification of economic-plan records.
- The Criminal Investigation Directorate assisted the Procuracy, and on occasion the KGB, in the investigation of criminal cases.
- There was a separate department for investigating and prosecuting minor cases, such as traffic violations
- The Maintenance of Public Order Directorate was responsible for ensuring order in public places and for preventing outbreaks of public unrest.
- Fire Protection Directorate
- Directorate of Milita. The members of the militsiya (uniformed police), as part of the regular police force, were distinguished by their gray uniforms with red piping. The duties of the militsiya included patrolling public places to ensure order and arresting persons who violated the law, including vagrants and drunks. Resisting arrest or preventing a police officer from executing his duties was a serious crime in the Soviet Union, punishable by one to five years' imprisonment. Killing a policeman was punishable by death.
- Internal Troops Directorate - administered the MVD Internal Troops, a large paramilitary force organized like the Ground Forces but under the Ministry of Internal Affairs.
- The Office of Visas and Registration was charged with registering Soviet citizens and foreigners residing in each precinct of a city and with issuing internal passports to Soviet citizens. Soviet citizens wishing to emigrate from the Soviet Union and foreigners wishing to travel within the Soviet Union had to obtain visas from this office.
- The Office of Recruitment and Training supervised the recruitment of new members of the militsiya, who were recommended by work collectives and public organizations. The local party and Komsomol bodies screened candidates thoroughly to ensure their political reliability. Individuals serving in the militsiya were exempt from the regular military draft.
- Office of Motor Vehicle Inspection

== Educational institutions under the MVD ==
- Novosibirsk Higher Military Command School of the Internal Troops
- Ordzhonikidze Higher Military Command School of the Internal Troops named after Sergey Kirov
- Perm Higher Military Command School of the Internal Troops
- Saratov Higher Military Command School of the Internal Troops named after Felix Dzerzhinsky
- Kharkov Higher Military School of Logistics of the Internal Troops
- Leningrad Higher Political-School of Internal Troops named after the 60th anniversary of the Komsomol

== List of ministers ==
- Sergei Kruglov (15 March 1946 – 5 March 1953)
- Lavrentiy Beria (5 March 1953 – 26 June 1953)
- Sergei Kruglov (26 June 1953 – 31 January 1956)
- Nikolai Dudorov (31 January 1956 – 1 May 1960)
- Nikolai Shchelokov (17 September 1966 – 17 December 1982)
- Vitaly Fedorchuk (17 December 1982 – 24 January 1986)
- Aleksandr Vlasov (24 January 1986 – 20 October 1988)
- Vadim Bakatin (20 October 1988 – 1 December 1990)
- Boris Pugo (1 December 1990 – 22 August 1991)
- Vasily P. Trushin (22 August 1991 – 23 August 1991) (Acting)
- Viktor Barannikov (23 August 1991 – 19 December 1991)
