= Aleksandr Mikhaylovich Korotkov =

Soviet Intelligence Officer

Aleksandr Korotkov
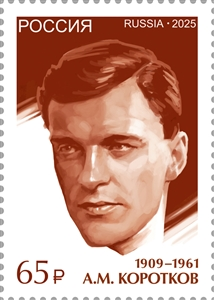
- Korotkov on a 2025 stamp of Russia

Acting Head of the 2nd Chief Directorate of the MVD
- In office 28 May 1953 – 17 July 1953
- Preceded by: Vasili Ryasnoy
- Succeeded by: Aleksandr Panyushkin

Personal details
- Born: 22 November 1909 Moscow, Moscow Governorate, Russian Empire
- Died: 27 June 1961 (aged 51) Moscow, RSFSR, Soviet Union
- Spouse: Maria Borisovna Vilkovskaya

Military service
- Allegiance: Soviet Union
- Branch/service: OGPU; NKVD; MGB; KGB
- Years of service: 1928–1961
- Rank: Major general
- Battles/wars: World War II; Hungarian Revolution of 1956

Aleksandr Mikhaylovich Korotkov (Russian: Алекса́ндр Миха́йлович Коротко́в; 22 November 1909 – 27 June 1961) was a Soviet intelligence officer and operative with the rank of major general. He became chief of foreign reconnaissance in the Soviet occupation zone in Germany in 1947 and chief of the KGB while he was stationed in East Germany in 1957. Korotkov was most notable as the intelligence officer who recruited Arvid Harnack in September 1940 and Harro Schulze-Boysen later in Berlin during the Nazi regime, effectively changing a resistance organisation who fought against Hitler into the espionage organisation known as the Red Orchestra. Korotkov was an associate of Ivan Serov.

== Life ==
Korotkov's father, Mikhail Korotkov was a banker who worked before the revolution at the Russo-Asiatic Bank in the Chinese city of Kuldzha. He had left his family even before Korotkov was born. His pregnant wife Anna, returned to Moscow where she brought up Aleksandr and her daughter Nina alone. Aleksandr's elder brother Pavel Korotkov, later a well known football player, was brought up by his father's sister in Moscow. Although they were brought up in different families, the two brothers remained close. When the October Revolution occurred, the family found itself in dire financial straits and the family became hungry. To ensure Aleksandr survived, his mother Anna sent him to an orphanage. After gaining employment as a secretary, he was returned and the family was made whole.

Korotkov completed nine years of secondary school in 1927. Korotkov, planning to attend Moscow State University abandoned his plans to support his family by beginning employment as an electrician's assistant. During his free time, he played tennis at the Dynamo Stadium. It was while playing tennis, that Korotkov attracted the attention of Veniamin Leonardovich Gerson, a Chekist, who at one time was the assistant to Felix Dzerzhinsky and later Vyacheslav Menzhinsky. Gerson drew attention to Korotkov's outstanding physical features during a football match. In October 1928, on the personal recommendation of Gerson, Korotkov was hired by the Commandant's Office of Administration and Economy of the Joint State Political Directorate as a lift fitter and lift operator in Lubyanka. In December 1928 he was transferred to the First Chief Directorate (INO OGPU)/(Foreign Department), where he worked as a clerk distributing newspapers and classified letters, and then as a senior clerk.

== Career ==
From January 1930, he worked as an assistant operations(ops) officer, then an ops officer of the 2nd, 7th and then again the 2nd branch of the OGPU IP. To test his analytic capabilities, Korotkov was tested with analysing the work of the German Society for the Promotion of Industrial Enterprises, whose offices were located in Moscow. Korotkov concluded that the organisation was a front for establishing German agents into the Soviet Union. This was confirmed by work done by Artur Artuzov in 1927, who came to the same conclusion. From that point forward Korotkov began training to be become an agent, taking foreign language classes. In 1933, he was first sent to Vienna travelling under the cover of an Austrian with a Czech identity using the name of Rajenetsky. and then sent to Paris through Austria and Switzerland in the operative group "Express" headed by Alexander Orlov, who later escaped to the West. The task of the group was to develop the Second Bureau (Intelligence) of the French General Staff and conduct recruitment in its most important units. In Paris, he was ordered to enroll in an anthropology course at the Sorbonne as cover and enroll as a student to learn wireless telegraphy. While in Paris, Korotkov learned to speak German from a member of the Hamburg Communist International (Comintern) branch. His French language teacher was Maria Borisovna Vilkovskaya, who eventually became his wife. They had a daughter Sophia. At university, Orlov attempted to recruit a student who worked as a photographer for the Deuxième Bureau but the contact fell under the radar of the French counter-intelligence service (Direction générale des services spéciaux). To avoid failure, Korotkov was temporarily transferred to Germany and from there to the USSR. From 1935 he was an authorised reserve officer of the Personnel Department, then an operative of the 7th Section of the Foreign Affairs Department of the Main Directorate of the NKVD.

From April 1936 to December 1937, under the name of Vladimir Petrovich Korotkikh and under the guise of a representative of the People's Commissariat for Heavy Industry at the USSR Trade Representation in Germany, he operated in Berlin. There he received a number of valuable agents, as part of Operation Krona. In particular, he was engaged in obtaining new samples of German military equipment as well as synthetic rubber and oil.

In December 1937, Korotkov was instructed to go to France for illegal work. He was to lead a group established specifically to assassinate a number of traitors. In August 1937, the group headed by Korotkov killed Georges Agabekov, and in July of the next year – the secretary of the international association of Trotskyists, Rudolf Klement. According to Pavel Sudoplatov, the execution of Georges Agabekov was organised in Paris in August 1937 by Korotkov. Boris Bazhanov detailed in his version that the NKVD provoked Agabekov to participate in the resale of jewellery stolen in Spain. When he turned up to view the stolen jewellery in a location near the Spanish–French border, he was executed by the NKVD. Agabekov's body was never found.

In 1938, Korotkov was recalled to Moscow and transferred to the reserve assignment. In 1939 he was dismissed from the NKVD, due to his ties with Gerson, amongst others. However, after sending a letter to Lavrentiy Beria, (an astonishing act) Korotkov was reinstated in the intelligence service. From April 1939 he became the Senior Commissioner, and from May 1939, the Deputy Chief of the 1st (German) Division of the 5th Department of the NKVD Main Directorate of State Security. In the same year he was admitted as a member of the All-Union Communist Party of Bolsheviks.

At the end of 1939, he went on overseas missions to Denmark and Norway under the guise of being a diplomatic courier for the Ministry of Foreign Affairs.

== World War II ==
In July 1940, on the initiative of intelligence chief Pavel Fitin, Korotkov was sent for a month to Germany under the guise of a stand-in for Soviet exhibitions in Königsberg and Leipzig to re-establish communication with especially valuable sources whose operation had been discontinued in 1936–1938. At the end of August 1940, he returned to Berlin as deputy chief of staff under the cover of 3rd secretary of the Soviet embassy in Germany. There he intensified his re-established connections, in particular with Willi Lehmann ("Breitenbach"), and established personal contacts with the leaders of the anti-fascist underground, Arvid Harnack ("Corsican") and Harro Schulze-Boysen ("Starshina") where he was known as Alexander Erdberg. From these anti-fascists, the Residency received the most valuable information on the preparation of Germany for an attack on the Soviet Union. During a year of work, Korotkov managed to increase the residence in Germany from one employee to 13 people. For his work he earned the nickname "King of the Illegals".

During the first days of Great Patriotic War in June 1941, the Soviet embassy building in Berlin was blockaded by the Gestapo. Risking his life, Korotkov managed to travel into the city several times to hold meetings with agents, to conduct operations and deliver a radio along with a large sum of money to Harnack and Schulze-Boysen, to enable them to continue espionage operations. Korotkov was eventually interned as a staff member of the Soviet Union's diplomatic mission in Germany. He eventually returned to Moscow via Turkey as part of the Soviet–German exchange of diplomats. From August 1941 onwards, he was deputy chief and from October 1941 – head of the 1st department (intelligence in Germany and the occupied territories), of the NKVD of the USSR. He coordinated operations on organisation of communication with agents, directed the preparation of agents-illegals and their withdrawal to the territory of the enemy.

In 1943–1944, he left for Tehran and twice for Afghanistan for performance of special tasks on execution of German agents in these countries, acting under the name of colonel Mikhaylov. From 20 October 1945 to 19 January 1946, he was located in Berlin as Chief of Soviet foreign reconnaissance in the Soviet occupation zone in Germany in Germany and acted as the deputy political adviser to Soviet Military Administration in Germany.

== Post war ==
From May 1946, he was head of the 1-B Directorate (illegal intelligence) and deputy head of the PSU of the Ministry of State Security. From 20 July 1947, Korotkov was head of the 4th Directorate (illegal intelligence) of the Information Committee under the Council of Ministers of the Soviet Union. From 19 May 1949, Korotkov was simultaneously a member of the Information Committee.

From 9 September 1950, Korotkov was Deputy Head of Bureau No.1 of the Ministry of State Security (Soviet Union). From November 1952, he was deputy head of First Chief Directorate (PGU) of the Ministry of State Security of the Soviet Union and head of Directorate 'C' (illegal intelligence). From March 1953, he became the deputy chief. From 28 May 1953, he was promoted to Head of the Voronezh State University of the Ministry of Internal Affairs of the USSR. From 17 July 1953, he became Head of the Illegal Intelligence Department of the Voronezh State University. From March 1954, Korotkov became acting Head of the Special Administration (HP), Acting Deputy Head of the PSU. From 6 September 1955, he was head of the Special Directorate and deputy head of the PGU under the Council of Ministers of the Soviet Union. On 4 January 1956 Korotkov was awarded the rank of Major General.

== Awards and honours ==
- On 26 June 1953, Korotkov was awarded the Order of Lenin
- Six Orders of the Red Banner

- 5 November 1944 (Note: For carrying out special assignments behind enemy lines)
- 2 March 1945 (Note: For the mobilisation and internment of German civilians from Eastern Europe and Germany to work in the USSR)
- 20 July 1949 (Note: For Length of Service)
- 26 August 1954, 18 December 1956 (Note: For suppressing the Hungarian uprising)

- 21 April 1945, Korotkov was awarded the Order of the Patriotic War, 1st class (Note: For 'cleaning up the rear of the Red Army fronts)
- Korotkov was awarded the Order of the Red Star on 20 September 1943 and again on 3 November 1944 (Note: For Length of Service)

Korotkov was awarded the following badges:

- Badge of Honour for Honorary Worker of the VChK-GPU (XV) on 9 May 1938
- Badge of "Honoured Worker of the NKVD" awarded on 27 April 1940
- Badge "Honorary officer of State Security
- Czechoslovak Order of the Cross of Battle in 1939
- Order of the Partisan Star (Yugoslavia) in 1946
- Order of the GDR "For Services to the Fatherland" in gold in 1958
- Polish state awards

== Bibliography ==
- Pringle, Robert W. (2015). Historical Dictionary of Russian and Soviet Intelligence (2nd ed.). Lanham: Rowman & Littlefield Publishers. p. 136. ISBN 978-1-4422-5317-9. Archived from the original on 6 November 2021.
