= Sergey Spigelglas =

Soviet intelligence officer (1897-1941)

Acting Head of the 5th Department of GUGB-NKVD
- In office February 17 1938 – June 9 1938
- Preceded by: Abram Slutsky
- Succeeded by: Zelman Passov

Personal details
- Born: Sergey Mikhailovich Spigelglas; April 29, 1897 Mosty, Grodno Governorate, Russian Empire
- Died: January 29, 1941 (aged 43) USSR
- Occupation: Spymaster

Military service
- Allegiance: Russian Empire (1916–1918); Russian Soviet Federative Socialist Republic (1921–1922); Soviet Union (1922–1953)
- Branch/service: Imperial Russian Army; Red Army; Cheka; GPU; OGPU; NKVD
- Rank: Ensign; Major of State Security
- Battles/wars: Russian Civil War

Sergey Mikhailovich Spigelglas or Spiegelglass or Shpigelglas (Russian: Серге́й Миха́йлович Шпи́гельглас) (29 April 1897 – 29 January 1941) was the acting head of the Soviet foreign intelligence service and then part of the NKVD, from February to June 1938.

Spigelglas was born into the family of a Jewish bookkeeper in Mosty, in present-day Hrodna Voblast, Belarus. After graduating from Warsaw Technical High School, he entered the law school at Moscow University. In 1917, he was drafted into the Russian Army and served as an ensign in the 42nd reserve regiment. Following the October Revolution, he joined the Cheka, and because of his facility with languages—he spoke French, Polish, German, and Russian—he became a member of the Foreign Department. In 1926, he was stationed in Mongolia, perhaps reporting to Yakov Blumkin, where he conducted active intelligence work against China and Japan.

In 1930, Spigelglas became the chief undercover agent of the OGPU, later the NKVD, in Paris. As a cover for his operations, he worked as the bourgeois proprietor of a fish store near the Boulevard Montmartre. Spigelglas's main task was spying on the White Russian and Trotskyist organizations in Paris, where he controlled the penetration agents Mark Zborowski and Roland Abbiate. He successfully recruited the double agent Nikolai Skoblin and his wife Nadezhda Plevitskaya.

Spigelglas returned to Moscow, where he trained new agents in counterintelligence and acted as deputy director of the Foreign Department reporting to Abram Slutsky. His particular forte was the liternoye (top secret) or liquidation operation. He engineered the assassination of the Ukrainian nationalist Yevhen Konovalets in Rotterdam in May 1938, the execution of the defector Ignace Reiss in Switzerland in September 1937 and the kidnapping of the leader of the Russian All-Military Union (ROVS), General Evgenii Miller, in France in September 1937. It has also been suggested that he was the mastermind of the murder and decapitation of the Trotskyist leader of the Fourth International, Rudolf Klement, in France in July 1938 and of the murder of the defector Georges Agabekov in France in 1937. When Slutsky died in February 1938, poisoned by the order of Nikolai Yezhov, Spigelglas became the acting director of foreign intelligence.

The head of the NKVD, Lavrenti Beria, had Spigelglas arrested seven months later, on November 2, 1938. He was held in Lefortovo prison and attempted a hunger strike which failed once his jailers began a regimen of intravenous feeding. After "strong pressure," a euphemism for torture, he began to make a confession in May 1939, and a tribunal convicted him of treachery on November 28, 1940. (In his confession, Spigelglas claimed that Lev Sedov had died of natural causes, not the victim of NKVD foul play.) Spigelglas was executed on January 29, 1941.

Historical opinion on Spigelglas is divided. Some, following the lead of Alexander Orlov, portray him as a "careerist" ready to liquidate dozens of honest people to advance himself, a man who could disingenuously claim that the deaths of those he murdered were necessary in the Bolshevik's struggle against their enemies. Others, following Pavel Sudoplatov, believe him to be polite, business-like, intelligent and patriotic. The Russian government rehabilitated him in 1991.
