= Abram Slutsky =

Soviet intelligence officer (1898-1938)

- Абра́м Слу́цкий
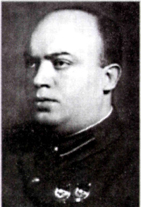
- Slutsky wearing his Orders of the Red Banner

Head of the 7th Department of GUGB-NKVD
- In office May 21 1935 – February 17 1938
- Preceded by: Artur Artuzov
- Succeeded by: Sergey Spigelglas

Personal details
- Born: July 1898 Parafiivka, Chernigov Governorate, Russian Empire
- Died: 17 February 1937 (aged 39) Moscow, Russian SFSR, Soviet Union
- Party: Russian Communist Party (1917–1938)

Military service
- Allegiance: Russian Soviet Federative Socialist Republic (1920–1922); Soviet Union (1922–1937)
- Branch/service: Imperial Russian Army; Red Army; Cheka; GPU; OGPU; NKVD
- Rank: Commissar of State Security 2nd rank

Abram Aronovich Slutsky (Russian: Абра́м Аро́нович Слу́цкий; July 1898 – 17 February 1938) was a Soviet intelligence officer who headed the Soviet foreign intelligence service (INO), then part of the NKVD, from May 1935 to 17 February 1938, when he was allegedly poisoned.

== Biography ==
Slutsky was born in 1898 into the family of a Jewish railroad worker in a Ukrainian village, Parafiivka, currently in Chernihiv Oblast. As a youth he worked as an apprentice to a metal craftsman, then as clerk at a cotton plant. In the First World War he served in the Imperial Russian Army as a volunteer in the 7th Siberian Rifle Regiment. In 1917, he joined the Russian Social Democratic Labour Party (Bolsheviks). During the Civil War he fought for the Red Army and afterward, in 1920, moved to the organs of the GPU/OGPU, where by dint of his affable personality he rose rapidly through the ranks.

Originally, Slutsky worked in the OGPU's Economic Department engaged in industrial espionage. He received the first of two Orders of the Red Banner for his role in directing the apparatus which stole the process for making ball-bearings from the Swedes. In another clandestine operation, he extorted $300,000 from Ivar Kreuger, the Swedish Match King, by threatening to flood world markets with cheap matches made in the Soviet Union. In 1929, he was appointed as the assistant to Artur Artuzov, head of the Foreign Department. In May 1935, Genrikh Yagoda, chief of the secret police, replaced Artuzov with Slutsky.

During Slutsky's tenure, the Foreign Department was principally engaged in tracking down and eliminating opponents of Stalin's regime, essentially emigre White Russians and Trotskyists. Major operations included kidnapping of General Evgenii Miller, burglary of the Trotsky archive in Paris, assassination of Ignace Reiss, and liquidation of numerous Trotskyists and anti-Stalinists in Spain during the Civil War. Slutsky's illegals in Great Britain, Arnold Deutsch and Theodore Maly, were responsible for recruiting and developing the infamous Cambridge Five. In August 1936, he participated in concocting evidence used in the first Moscow Trial, the so-called "Trotskyite-Zinovievite Terrorist Centre." The task of extracting false confessions from Sergei Mrachkovsky and Ivan Smirnov fell to him. The voluble Slutsky described his methods for "breaking-down" these Old Bolsheviks to his subordinates, Alexander Orlov and Walter Krivitsky, who subsequently recounted these episodes in their memoirs.

In character, the defector Orlov, who worked directly under him and knew him well, thought Slutsky was "distinguished by laziness, a propensity for window dressing and by subservience to his chiefs. He was gentle by nature, cowardly and double-faced." Elizabeth Poretsky, who met with him frequently in 1936, thought he "was a person of many contradictions ... he would weep while telling of the interrogation of some of the defendants at the trials and bemoan the fates of their families; in the same breath he would denounce them as 'Trotskyite fascists.'" But, as she noted, he might have been stage-acting, hoping that others "would betray themselves when he feigned sympathy for the victims of the trials." Poretsky adds that he courageously interceded with his superiors to save the families of condemned Bolsheviks.

When Nikolai Yezhov assumed control of the NKVD in 1937, he began to arrest and liquidate the department heads whom he knew were close to his deposed predecessor, Yagoda. Slutsky was spared, even though he was implicated in confessions as a "participant in Yagoda's conspiracy," because Yezhov feared that Slutky's arrest would cause Soviet agents who were operating abroad to defect. Nevertheless, Slutsky's days were numbered, and his end came on 17 February 1938.

== Death ==
There are two unofficial accounts of Slutsky's death. The first appeared in Orlov's Secret History of Stalin's Crimes (1953) and presumably is based on gossip Orlov heard in France or Spain in 1938. In Orlov's version, Slutsky was invited to a meeting in the office of Mikhail Frinovsky, head of the GUGB, in the Lubyanka. Shortly afterward, his deputy, Sergei Shpigelglas, was called into the office and he observed Slutsky slumped in a chair with tea and cakes at the table beside him. Frinovsky said Slutsky had died suddenly of a heart attack. The chief of the NKVD, Nikolai Yezhov, ordered Slutsky's body put in the main hall of the NKVD club and surrounded by an honor guard of NKVD officers. However, the embalmers neglected to cover the tell-tale spots on Slutsky's face which indicated to the mourners that he had been poisoned with prussic acid.

The second account comes from Frinovsky's confession, obtained before his execution, in which he claims Yezhov ordered him to "remove Slutsky without noise." Accordingly, Frinovsky invited Slutsky to his office for a conference, and while they were talking another deputy slipped into the room and covered Slutsky's nose with a chloroform mask. Once Slutsky passed out, a second deputy, who was hiding in an adjacent office, entered the room and "injected poison into the muscle of his right arm." Frinovsky summoned a doctor, who confirmed that Slutsky had died of a heart attack, which Pravda repeated in its 18 February obituary. None of the witnesses to this crime survived the Great Purge.

Two months after his death, Slutsky was posthumously stripped of his All-Union Communist Party (Bolsheviks) membership and declared an enemy of the people. Although he has been rehabilitated, the Russian government's official position is that Slutsky died while working in his office.

== See also ==
- Ignace Reiss
- Walter Krivitsky
- Evgenii Miller
- Arnold Deutsch
- Theodore Maly
- Ivan Smirnov
- Alexander Orlov
- Sergei Shpigelglas
- Nikolai Yezhov

== Sources ==
- Marc Jansen and Nikita Petrov, Stalin's Loyal Executioner: People's Commissar Nikolai Ezhov, Hoover Institution Press, 2002. 274 pages ISBN 978-0-8179-2902-2
- Walter Krivitsky, In Stalin's Secret Service, Enigma Books, 2000 ISBN 1-929631-03-0
- Alexander Orlov, The Secret History of Stalin's Crimes. Random House, 1953.
- Elisabeth K. Poretsky, Our own people: A memoir of 'Ignace Reiss' and his friends, University of Michigan Press, 1969. 278 pages ISBN 0-472-73500-4
- Pavel Sudoplatov, Special Tasks, Little, Brown & Company, 1994.
