= Germany–Soviet Union relations =

Germany–Soviet Union relations may refer to one of four periods in Germany:

- Germany–Soviet Union relations (1918–1941) from the establishment of the Soviet Union until German declaration of war and World War II
- Soviet occupation zone in Germany in 1945–1949
- Soviet Union–West Germany relations in 1949–1990
- East Germany–Soviet Union relations in 1949–1990
