= Vladimir Dekanozov =

Soviet senior state security operative and diplomat (1898–1953)

- Владимир Деканозов
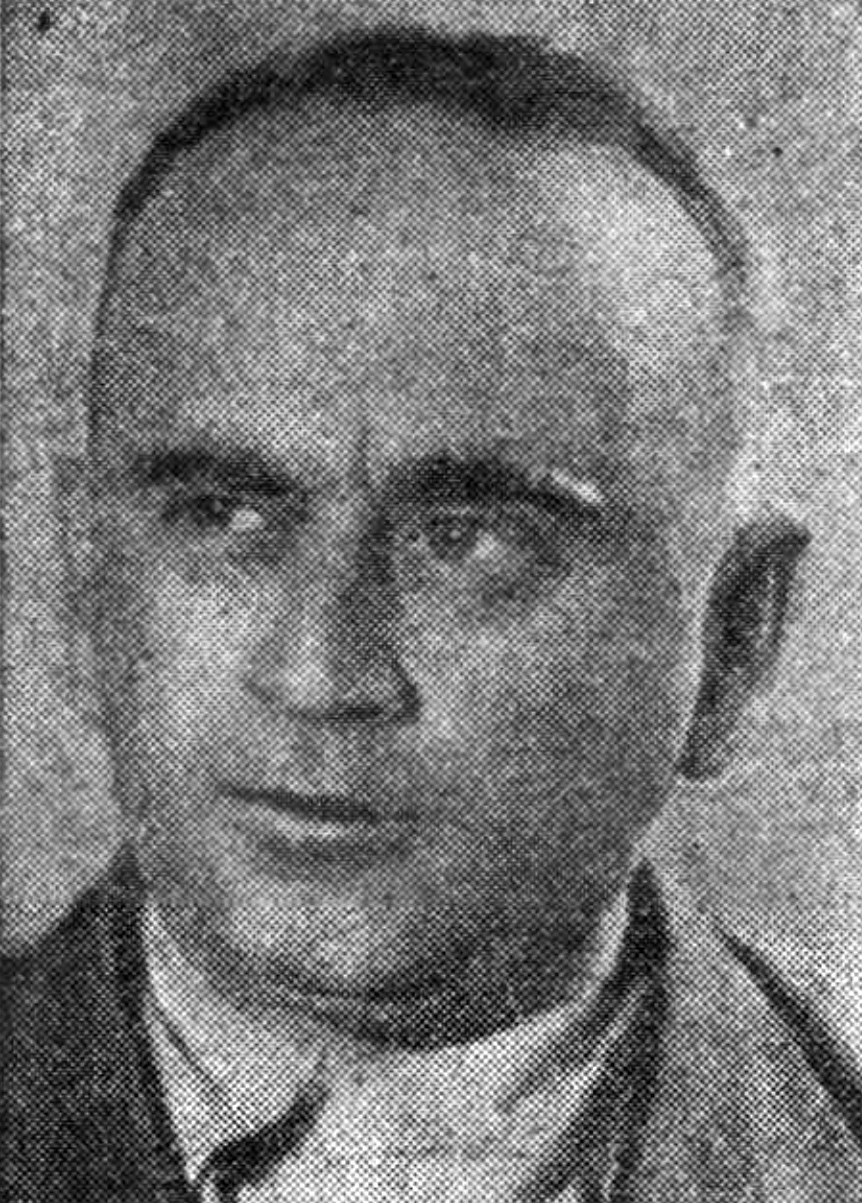
- Dekanozov in 1938

Minister of Internal Affairs of the Georgian SSR
- In office 15 April 1953 – 10 July 1953
- Preceded by: Varlam Kakuchaya
- Succeeded by: Aleksi Inauri

Deputy Minister of Foreign Affairs
- In office March 1946 – March 1947

Plenipotentiary Representative of the USSR in Germany
- In office 24 November 1940 – 22 June 1941
- Preceded by: Alexander Shkvartsev
- Succeeded by: diplomatic relations severed

Head of the 5th Department of GUGB-NKVD
- In office 2 December 1938 – 13 May 1939
- Preceded by: Pavel Sudoplatov
- Succeeded by: Pavel Fitin

Personal details
- Born: June 1898 Baku, Baku Governorate, Russian Empire
- Died: 23 December 1953 (aged 55) Moscow, Russian Soviet Federative Socialist Republic, Soviet Union
- Cause of death: Execution by shooting
- Party: Communist Party of the Soviet Union

Military service
- Allegiance: Russian Soviet Federative Socialist Republic (1918–1922); Soviet Union (1922–1953)
- Branch/service: Red Army; Cheka; GPU; OGPU; NKVD; MGB
- Years of service: 1918–1953
- Rank: Colonel General
- Battles/wars: World War II

Vladimir Georgievich Dekanozov (Russian: Владимир Георгиевич Деканозов; June 1898 – 23 December 1953) was a Soviet senior state security operative and diplomat.

According to the sentence issued by Military Collegium of the Supreme Court of the Soviet Union he was an associate of the "Lavrentiy Beria gang" and was sentenced to death in 1953. The sentence was carried out shortly after.

== Biography ==
=== Early life ===
According to his official biography, Vladimir Dekanozov was born in Baku, in the Baku Governorate (now Azerbaijan), to the family of George Dekanozishvili, founder of the Party of Georgian Social-Federalists. The Georgian name Dekanozishvili, meaning Son of a Deacon, allegedly indicated a Georgian noble family belonging to the Georgian Orthodox Church. (Compare his Russian-language alleged surname, Protopopov, with the Russian Orthodox Church rank of "protopop" – Russian: протопоп – translated as "protopope" or "dean"). Although Dekanozov identified as a Georgian, some rumors falsely suggested that he might have had Armenian heritage due to his russified name. These rumours are known to have originated as a joke made by Georgian-born Joseph Stalin, who frequently teased and mocked Dekanozov.

Some historians have concluded that he assumed the name "Dekanozov" and a Georgian ethnic identity in order to hide his true origin, an action that was quite common among the Bolsheviks. According to the Lithuanian writer Liudas Dovydenas, who knew him, the blonde and blue-eyed Dekanozov was not Georgian, but rather a person from Estonia. Dovydenas asserted that Dekanozov's father was an ethnic Russian and that his mother was from a Jewish family assimilated to Baltic German culture. This is also supported by a statement by J. Edgar Hoover, presumably based on British intelligence, that Dekanozov was born in Estonia and that his real name was Ivan Vasilyevich Protopopov.

Dekanozov's official biography states that he studied in the medical schools of Saratov University and Baku University. He entered the Red Army in 1918, and he joined the Bolshevik Party in 1920. From 1918, he allegedly worked as a secret agent in Transcaucasia, first in the People's Commissariat for Health of the short-lived (1918 to 1920) Azerbaijan Democratic Republic, and then in private oil-companies. After the Red Army invaded Azerbaijan (April 1920), Dekanozov worked for the Cheka of the Azerbaijan SSR, where he befriended Lavrenty Beria, who subsequently supported Dekanozov. In 1921–27, Dekanozov worked for the Cheka and associated successor organisations in Azerbaijan, Georgia, and Transcaucasia. In 1927, he became an instructor of the Central Committee of the Communist Party of Georgia. In 1928–1931, he worked as one of the leaders of the Georgian and Transcaucasian OGPU. In 1931, he became a secretary of the Central Committee of the Communist Party of Georgia. From 1936, he served as the Narkom of the food industry of Georgia. From 1937, he simultaneously worked as the Chairman of Gosplan of Georgia and a deputy Chairman of Georgian Sovnarkom. He was a deputy of the Supreme Soviet of the USSR from 1937 to 1950.

He was transferred to the NKVD in November 1938, when Lavrentii Beria was appointed its head. Dekanozov was the deputy chief of GUGB and at the same time headed both its foreign-intelligence and counterintelligence departments from 1938 to 1939. Dekanozov was responsible for purges of the Red Army as well as for purging Nikolai Yezhov's supporters from the NKVD.

In May 1939 he was appointed deputy chief of the People's Commissariat for Foreign Affairs (NKID). His sphere of responsibility before 1941 included Iran, Turkey, Afghanistan, Mongolia, and Xinjiang, as well as the consulates, cadres, and finances of NKID.

=== Second World War ===
==== Incorporation of Lithuania into the USSR ====
Soviet military forces crossed the Lithuanian border on 15 June 1940; Lithuanian authorities called on the military of Lithuania not to resist. Dekanozov arrived on the same day to organise the incorporation of Lithuania into the Soviet Union. The Communist Party of Lithuania, headed by Antanas Sniečkus, was at his disposal. The Soviet military established a controlling presence that allowed Dekanozov to fulfil his function as representative of the Soviet Communist Party. The process establishing the Lithuanian Soviet Socialist Republic was Dekanozov's work. He installed himself in the Soviet embassy and imposed on Lithuania the Soviet party-state structure in which the traditional governmental forms were of only secondary importance. Dekanozov restructured the Lithuanian government, naming Justas Paleckis, a Lithuanian leftist who was not yet a member of the Communist Party, as Prime Minister.

Aided by specialists in Soviet administration and by Soviet security organs sent in from Moscow, Dekanozov worked through the Lithuanian Communist Party, while the cabinet of ministers, headed by Paleckis, served an administrative function. Dekanozov and Paleckis brought a number of pro-communist non-members of the Communist Party into the first "people’s government", but in retrospect it is clear that they constituted window-dressing for the Soviet takeover. For his part, Dekanozov pushed his program carefully, concentrating first of all on denouncing the Smetona regime in Lithuania, then promising to respect private property, assuring Lithuanians that agriculture would not be collectivized, and restraining any discussion of the possibility of joining the Soviet Union until mid-July.

On 6 July, Dekanozov's government announced that there would be elections for a new parliament on 14 July, a so-called People's Seimas. The Lithuanian Communist Party announced the formation of the Union of the Toiling People of Lithuania, which offered a slate of candidates, including some ten non-members of the Communist Party, with as many people as there were seats in the new parliament up for election. On 11 and 12 July, the Soviet authorities reduced the possible points of opposition by arresting leading figures of the old régime and deporting some of them to the interior of the Soviet Union, although Lithuania was still formally an independent state.

Dekanozov used the Lithuanian government and the Communist Party of Lithuania, as his instruments to carry out the will of the leadership of the Soviet All-Union Communist Party (Bolsheviks). Throughout the process, Soviet propagandists insisted there was only one acceptable path for the country, and that all were obliged to follow it. They concentrated on creating an image of mass support, and they called for determined measures against those who somehow opposed the new order and wanted to sabotage the elections of 14 July.

Lithuania became a part of the Stalinist Soviet party-state, administered within the All-Union Communist Party (Bolsheviks) structure, long before it was formally incorporated into the governmental structure of the Soviet Union. By the time of the formalization of the new Soviet state structure in Lithuania, Dekanozov had long since left Lithuania. In July 1940, he had returned to Moscow, his job completed, when the People's Seimas voted to ask for membership in the USSR. In barely more than a month, he had reorganized the Lithuanian state, set the social and economic development on Lithuania onto a new course, and contributed to the enlargement of the Soviet state. The Sovietisation of Lithuania started by Dekanozov was continued by Nikolai Pozdniakov.

==== Work in Berlin ====
From November 1940 until June 1941 Dekanozov, while remaining the deputy chief of NKID, also served as the Soviet ambassador to Berlin. On 21 June 1941, German Foreign Minister Joachim von Ribbentrop presented the German declaration of war on the Soviet Union to Dekanozov. German interpreter Erich Sommer recalled that Dekanozov listened calmly and said "I deeply regret that our leaders, Hitler and Stalin, did not meet in person. Then the whole history of mankind would have taken a different course".

In September 1943, he made a mysterious visit to Stockholm that Ribbentrop interpreted as a sign of Soviet interest in making a separate peace with Nazi Germany. Adolf Hitler, however, refused von Ribbentrop's plea that he be allowed to dispatch an envoy to Sweden.

=== After the Second World War ===
Dekanozov continued as the deputy chief of NKID and then of the Foreign Affairs Ministry until 1947. He held other senior positions before being appointed the Interior Minister of the Georgian SSR (after Beria became the Interior Minister of the USSR in March 1953) in April 1953. A close associate of Beria, he was removed from state positions almost immediately after the removal (June–July 1953) of Beria.

Dekanozov, regarded as a member of the so-called "Beria gang", was arrested in June 1953 and sentenced to death on 23 December 1953. The sentence was carried out the same day.

His case was reviewed both by the Soviet Union during the glasnost era and by the Russian Federation after the 1991 collapse of the USSR. Both reviews ruled him ineligible for rehabilitation.

== See also ==
- Soviet–German relations before 1941
