= Pavel Fitin =

Soviet intelligence officer (1907–1971)

- Павел Фитин
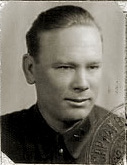
- P. M. Fitin (1907–1971), c. 1942

Head of Soviet Foreign Intelligence
- In office 13 May 1939 – 15 June 1946
- Preceded by: Vladimir Dekanozov
- Succeeded by: Pyotr Kubatkin

Personal details
- Born: Pavel Mikhailovich Fitin; 28 December 1907 Ozhogino, Yalutorovsky Uyezd, Russian Empire (presently Russia)
- Died: 24 December 1971 (aged 63) Moscow, Russia
- Citizenship: Soviet Union
- Party: Communist Party
- Education: Timiryazev Agricultural Academy
- Occupation: Intelligence officer
- Profession: Agriculture engineer
- Known for: Soviet atomic bomb project
- Awards: Order of the Red Banner; Order of the Red Star
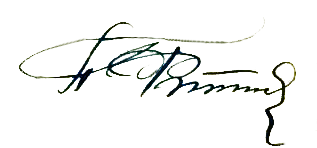
- Signature

Military service
- Allegiance: Soviet Union
- Branch: Red Army
- Service years: 1934–1935; 1938–1953
- Rank: Lieutenant General
- Conflict: World War II; Eastern Front; Operation Barbarossa

Pavel Mikhailovich Fitin (Russian: Павел Михайлович Фитин; 28 December 1907 – 24 December 1971) was a Soviet intelligence officer who was in-charge of managing the intelligence cycle on the American-led Manhattan Project, during the World War II.

The United States Army identified him in the Venona cables under the code name "Viktor."

== Early life and education ==
He was born into a Russian peasant family. In 1932 Fitin graduated from the Timiryazev Agricultural Academy, completing the program in agricultural engineering. In 1932–1934 he worked as an editor for the State Publishing House of Agricultural Literature. In 1934–1935 he served in the Red Army. In 1935 he continued his work in the State Publishing House of Agricultural Literature, and in 1936 he was appointed deputy chief editor of this publishing house. In 1938 he passed a training course in foreign intelligence at SHON, the foreign intelligence training school, located in Barvikha, near Moscow.

== NKVD Deputy Head ==
Fitin became deputy head of the GRU foreign intelligence service in 1938 and a year later, at the age of 31, its head with the rank of lieutenant general.[3] The GRU military intelligence service credits Fitin with the reorganization of the institution for gathering foreign intelligence, which had been weakened after Stalin's Great Terror. Fitin is credited with providing timely warnings about the German invasion (Operation Barbarossa) on June 22, 1941, through his military attachés in Berlin, Mikhail Alexandrovich Vorontsov (1900–1986) and Vasily Ivanovich Tupikov (1885–1941), which triggered the German-Soviet War.[4] Only the actual invasion saved Fitin from execution, as he had provided information to NKVD chief Lavrentiy Beria that General Secretary Joseph Stalin refused to believe. Beria retained Fitin as head of the foreign intelligence service until the end of the war, but demoted him.

Fitin thought it was important to build up a network of spies inside the Manhattan Project. However, at the beginning he was mainly reliant on Klaus Fuchs. Fitin gave the project the codename "Enormoz". In November 1944 he reported: "Despite participation by a large number of scientific organization and workers on the problem of Enormoz in the U.S., mainly known to us by agent data, their cultivation develops poorly. Therefore, the major part of data on the U.S. comes from the station in England. On the basis of information from London station, Moscow Center more than once sent to the New York station a work orientation and sent a ready agent, too (Klaus Fuchs)."

Another important source was John Cairncross. Pavel Fitin reported to Vsevolod Merkulov: "Valuable information on Enormoz is coming from the London station. The first materials on Enormoz were received in late 1941 from our source List (John Cairncross), containing valuable and absolutely secret documents both on the substance of the Enormoz problem and on measures by the British government to organize and develop work on the problem of atomic energy in our country. In connection with American and Canadian work on Enormoz, materials describing the state and progress of work in three countries – England, the U.S., and Canada – are all coming from the London station."

== Dishonored Discharge ==
After Beria was executed in 1953, Fitin was discharged from the NKVD and denied his pension. Fitin was unable to find employment until 1959.

== Honors ==
Fitin attained the rank of lieutenant-general, and was awarded the Order of the Red Banner twice, the Order of the Red Star, the Red Banner of Tuva and Order of the Republic of the Tuvan People's Republic.

== Legacy ==
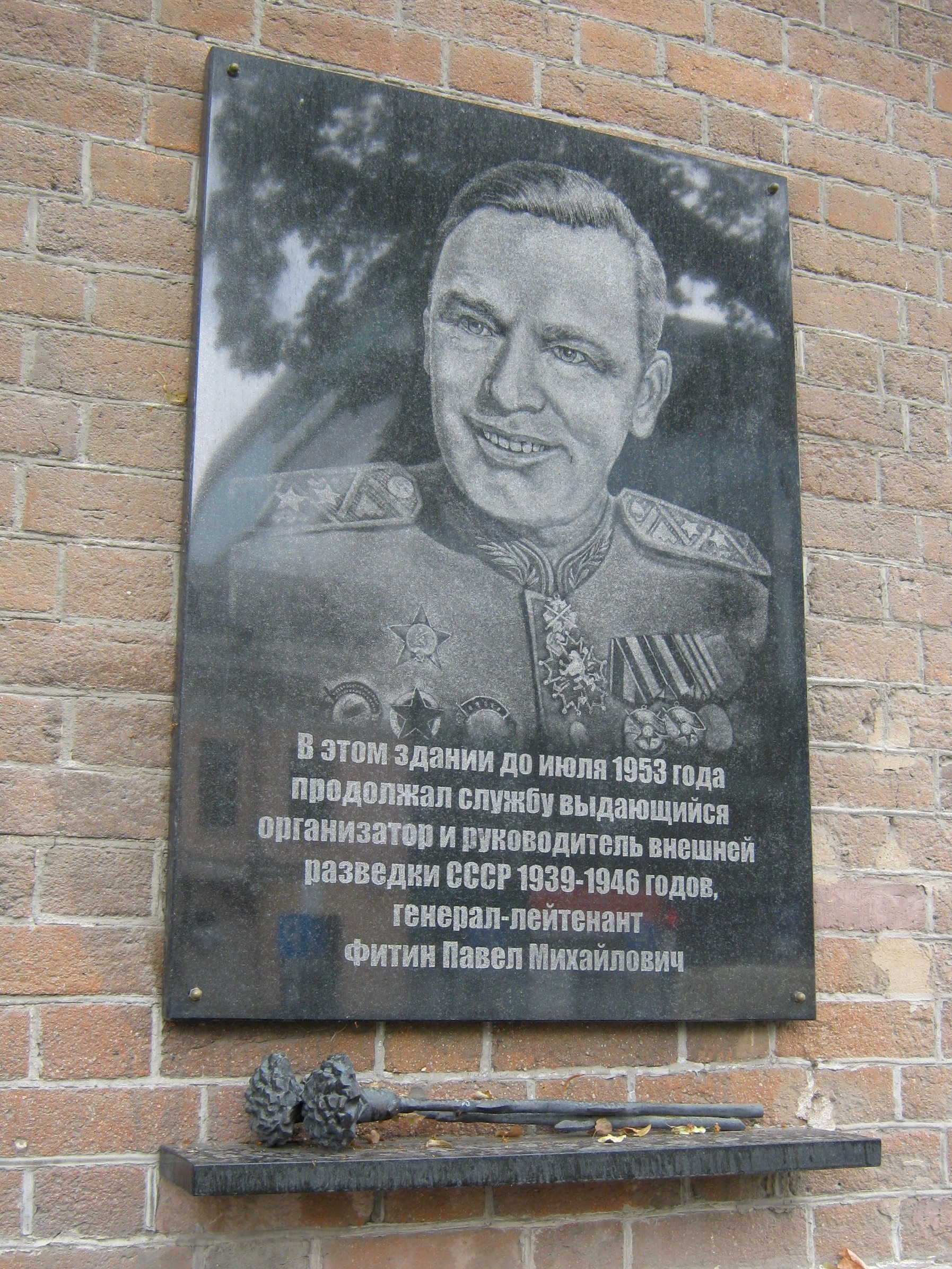
Memorial plaque of Pavel Fitin

In 1942, Joseph Stalin appointed Pavel Sudoplatov to head the intelligence work on the Manhattan Project, and to coordinate the data gathered by Soviet agents in England, Canada, and the United States. Most cables sent via the New York – Moscow connection were sent by KGB officer Leonid Kvasnikov, known as Anton, to Lieutenant General Pavel Mikhailovich Fitin, known as Viktor, who had been the head of the foreign intelligence section of the KGB at that time (NSA 2/9/44).

== See also ==
- Venona Project
- KGB
