= Aleksandr Sakharovsky =

Soviet general and KGB chief (1909–1983)

Head of the First Chief Directorate of the KGB
- In office 23 June 1955 – 15 July 1971
- Preceded by: Aleksandr Panyushkin
- Succeeded by: Fyodor Mortin

Personal details
- Born: 3 September 1909 Kostroma Oblast, Russian Empire
- Died: 12 November 1983 (aged 74) Moscow, Soviet Union

Military service
- Allegiance: Soviet Union
- Branch/service: Red Army; NKVD; MGB; KGB
- Years of service: 1931–1975
- Rank: Colonel general
- Battles/wars: World War II

Aleksandr Mikhailovich Sakharovsky (Russian: Александр Михайлович Сахаровский; 3 September 1909 – 12 November 1983) was a Soviet general who was head of the First Chief Directorate (foreign intelligence) of the KGB from 1955 to 1971. Sakharovsky oversaw the KGB foreign intelligence division during some of the key events of the Cold War, including the Hungarian uprising, the Cuban Missile Crisis and the height of the Vietnam War.

Highly respected by both KGB staff and allied services such as those of East Germany, Sakharovsky had experience himself in performing intelligence missions.

== Early life and career ==
Sakharovsky was born to a working-class family in Kostroma Oblast, on 3 September 1909. His family moved to Leningrad when he was a child, and he began his career as a welder at the Baltic Shipyard. He joined the Communist Youth League (Komsomol) in 1926, and was accepted as a full member of the Communist Party of the Soviet Union in 1930. In 1931 he was drafted into the Red Army for military service, and initially he was assigned to the 2nd Signals Regiment of Leningrad, but soon, recommended by the Komsomol, he was sent to study at the Lenin Military-Political Academy, graduating in October 1933. By decision of the Political Directorate of the Red Army, he was then sent to the post of secretary of the Komsomol bureau of the 63rd Construction Battalion, which performed public works in Sovetskaya Gavan of the Far Eastern Territory.

Demobilized in December 1934, Sakharovsky returned to Leningrad, initially working in political propaganda at the Northern Shipyard. In 1935, he was elected secretary of the Komsomol committee of the "Kanonersky" ship repair plant in Leningrad. In July of the same year, he was assigned to the Baltic Sea Shipping Company, as an instructor in the political department for the Marxist–Leninist education of the company's personnel. In February 1938, he was elected secretary of the shipping company's party committee.

== World War II ==
In February 1939, Sakharovsky was transferred to work in the state security bodies (NKVD) on the recommendation of the party. Taking advantage of his official position at the Baltic Sea Shipping Company, he was dispatched abroad for reconnaissance purposes for more than seven months, under the cover of being the assistant captain of the "Svaneti" passenger ship. He visited several countries of the Mediterranean Sea, including Greece and Italy. In August 1941, the First (Intelligence) Department was created in the NKVD Directorate for the Leningrad Region, in which Sakharovsky became deputy head. He rose to the rank of Major. The duties of Sakharovsky included the preparation of special groups to be sent behind enemy lines for sabotage and assassinations, as well as conducting defensive operations against German attempts at infiltration. In total, more than 40 reconnaissance and sabotage groups were created and sent behind German lines to perform sabotage and assassinations.

== Postwar Stalin Years ==
In 1945 Sakarovsky was transferred to the central office of the MGB, the precursor organization to the KGB, in Moscow. There he acted in support to Andrey Vyshinsky, a deputy Soviet People's Commissar of Foreign Affairs, during the incorporation of Latvia, Estonia and Lithuania into the Soviet Union during the late 1940s.

He was later chief of the second Information committee (KI) department, then MGB adviser during the establishment of the Securitate, the secret police agency of Communist Romania. During his time in Romania he was responsible for the interrogation of Lucrețiu Pătrășcanu, a communist leader critical of Stalin.

Apart from his work in building up the Romanian secret services, Sakharovsky was sent to perform intelligence missions in Finland, Greece and Turkey. As head of Section 7-A, he was responsible for foreign intelligence in Scandinavia, and then worked at 1-A Directorate, responsible for foreign "illegal" agents (those agents without diplomatic or official cover) in the First Chief Directorate of the MGB USSR.

== Chief of Foreign Intelligence ==
In May 1956 Sakharovsky was appointed head of First Chief Directorate of the KGB under the Council of Ministers of USSR, responsible for foreign operations and intelligence collection activities by the training and management of the covert agents, intelligence collection management, and the collection of political, scientific and technical intelligence. The first years of his tenure saw the creation of US military-political blocs, NATO, CENTO, SEATO; the Suez Crisis; the Hungarian uprising and the escalating crisis in Berlin. Sakharovsky was named "the father of international terrorism" by Ion Mihai Pacepa (who had worked with him), due to his alleged approach to turning "grassroots" terrorism into a weapon weakening USSR's political enemies. Pacepa claimed Sakharovsky organized trainings for Palestinian militants on hijacking and bombing civilian airplanes and published propaganda journals in Arabic, reprinting antisemitic fakes such as The Protocols of the Elders of Zion to fuel the Arabic-Israeli conflict. as well as created a "scientific" approach to covert assassinations disguised as regular car crashes.

== Later life and death ==
From July 1971 to January 1975, he was Senior Adviser to the Chairman of the KGB, Yuri Andropov. Seriously ill, he suffered a stroke on 1 February 1975 after which he retired. He died 12 November 1983 and was buried at Novodevichy Cemetery.
