= Zelman Passov =

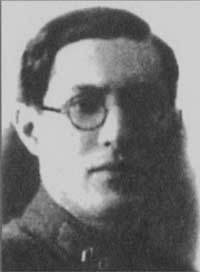

Head of the 5th Department of GUGB-NKVD
- In office June 9, 1938 – November 2, 1938
- Preceded by: Sergey Spigelglas
- Succeeded by: Pavel Sudoplatov

Personal details
- Born: Zelman Isaevich Passov; April 1905 Staraya Russa, Novgorod Province, Russian Empire
- Died: 15 February 1940 (aged 34) Moscow, Soviet Union
- Awards: Order of Lenin

Military service
- Allegiance: Russian Soviet Federative Socialist Republic (1921–1922); Soviet Union (1922–1938)
- Branch/service: Red Army; GPU; OGPU; NKVD
- Rank: Senior Major of State Security
- Battles/wars: Russian Civil War

Zelman Isaevich Passov (Russian: Зельман Исаевич Пассов; 1905 – 15 February 1940) was a Soviet security officer who headed the Soviet foreign intelligence service, then part of the NKVD from June to November 1938. In October 1938, he was arrested on charges of "participating in an anti-Soviet conspiracy". He was shot on the night of 15 February 1940, a year and a half later.

Passov originally joined the secret police, the GPU, in 1922. He received the Order of Lenin in 1937.

== Early life ==
He was born in April 1905 in Staraya Russa to a Jewish family; his father was a clerk. There he completed 3 grades of primary school and 2 grades of secondary school.

== Career ==
At the age of 14 he served in the Red Army (as a private courier of the 2nd Staraya Russa guard company in June–November 1919), but was soon discharged due to his early age. In May 1920 – September 1921, he was a clerk of the military commandant, District Police Department, Staraya Russa; in September 1921 – May 1922, he was a secretary of the military commissar of the communications battalion of the 56th rifle division.

In May 1922, he was hired by the GPU of the USSR in the office of the authorized representative for the Staro-Russky district. Until 1928, he was an employee of the Novgorod provincial department of the GPU, the Pskov provincial department of the GPU, and an employee of the GPU in the city of Porkhov. He was a member of the All-Union Communist Party (bolsheviks) since 1927 (member of the Komsomol in 1921–1929). In 1928–1929, he was a cadet at the Higher Border School of the OGPU; then an authorized representative of the special department of the Leningrad Military District division. From October 1929 – in the central office of the OGPU of the USSR (counterintelligence agencies and the Special Department): authorized representative of the 1st department of the KRO OGPU of the USSR (October 1929 – September 1930); authorized representative of the Special. Bureau of the Special Department of the OGPU of the USSR (September 1930 – April 1931); authorized representative of the 2nd department of the Special Department of the OGPU of the USSR (April–September 1931); operative authorized representative of the 3rd department of the Special Department of the OGPU of the USSR (September 1931 – January 1933); employee for special assignments of the Special Department of the OGPU of the USSR (January–June 1933); assistant to the chief of the 3rd department of the Special Department of the OGPU of the USSR (1 June 1933 – 15 January 1934); deputy chief of the 3rd department of the Special Department of the OGPU of the USSR (15 January – 10 July 1934);

After the formation of the NKVD of the USSR, from July 1934 – Deputy Chief of the 7th Department of the Special Department of the GUGB NKVD (10 July 1934 – 16 May 1935); then Chief of the 11th Department of the Special Department of the GUGB NKVD (16 May 1935 – December 1936).

From December 1936 in the Counterintelligence (3rd) Department of the GUGB NKVD USSR: Chief of the 3rd (Polish) Department of the 3rd Department of the GUGB NKVD USSR (December 1936 – 1 September 1937); simultaneously from 1 August to 1 September 1937 – assistant to the head of the 3rd Department of the GUGB A. M. Minaev-Tsikanovsky. Deputy Chief of the 3rd Department of the GUGB NKVD USSR (Minaev-Tsikanovsky) (1 September 1937 – 28 March 1938). Conducted "investigations" of a number of well-known individuals from among the leaders of the Communist Party of Poland (Yu. M. Leszczynski-Lenski, M. A. Loganovsky, etc.), which ended with their execution. As the head of the Polish department of the 3rd department of the GUGB NKVD of the USSR, he bears full responsibility for conducting the "Polish operation" of the NKVD in 1937–1938, mass arrests, torture and executions of Soviet citizens of Polish nationality and natives of the Kingdom of Poland. As an assistant and deputy head of the 3rd department of the NKVD of the USSR Minaev-Tsikanovsky, along with him, V. F. Grigoriev, S. G. Volynsky, A. D. Davydov, I. S. Naidman and others, he bears responsibility for conducting national operations of the NKVD throughout the territory of the USSR and the mass murders of "persons of counter-revolutionary nationality" through album sentences of the Commission of the People's Commissar of the NKVD and the Prosecutor of the USSR and local "troikas" of the NKVD Directorate, as well as Stalin's execution lists.

On March 28, 1938, he was appointed head of the 5th (Foreign) Department of the 1st Directorate of the NKVD of the USSR; from September 29, 1938, he was head of the 5th Department of the GUGB NKVD of the USSR. As the head of foreign intelligence of the NKVD, he was responsible for the arrests of a number of Soviet intelligence officers, which he initiated and sanctioned (B. Ya. Bazarov, Ya. Ya. Vitolin-Orlov, I. G. Gert, I. I. Gertsenberg, I. I. Kvetkov, I. A. Markov, brothers Azariy and Avakim Mnatsakanov, Kh. Ya. Reif, Yu. Ya. Tomchin, F. S. Fridman, E. Ya. Furman, and others).

== Downfall ==
On October 23, 1938, he was arrested on charges of " participation in an anti-Soviet conspiracy within the NKVD." He was held in the Sukhanovskaya Special Purpose Prison. During the preliminary investigation, he "pleaded guilty." He was included in L. Beria's list of January 16, 1940, under the 1st category. Passov's former boss, N. I. Yezhov, who was sentenced to capital punishment on February 3, 1940, mentioned him in his final statement as an employee whom he unconditionally trusted even after his arrest (along with V. E. Tsesarsky, I. I. Shapiro, N. N. Fyodorov, and A. S. Zhurbenko). On February 14, 1940, he was sentenced by the Supreme Commander-in-Chief of the USSR to capital punishment under Articles 58/1, paragraph "a" ("treason"); Article 58/7 ("sabotage"); Article 58/8 ("terror"); Art. 58/11 ("participation in an anti-Soviet conspiratorial organization in the NKVD") of the Criminal Code of the RSFSR. At the court hearing of the Supreme Commander-in-Chief of the Supreme Commander-in-Chief of the USSR, he did not admit guilt, stating that during the preliminary investigation he was subjected to beatings and was forced to give false testimony. He was shot on the night of February 15, 1940, together with a group of command personnel from the Central Archive of the Red Army. Burial place: "grave of unclaimed ashes" No. 1 of the crematorium of the Donskoye Cemetery.

In 1957, during a review of the case, by a decision of the Main Military Prosecutor's Office of the USSR, he was found guilty of falsifying criminal cases and illegal methods of conducting an investigation. Passov's rehabilitation was denied. On November 7, 2013, the Judicial Collegium for Military Personnel of the Supreme Court of the Russian Federation found him ineligible for rehabilitation.

== Awards ==
- Order of Lenin (1937)
