= Commanders of the border troops USSR and RF =

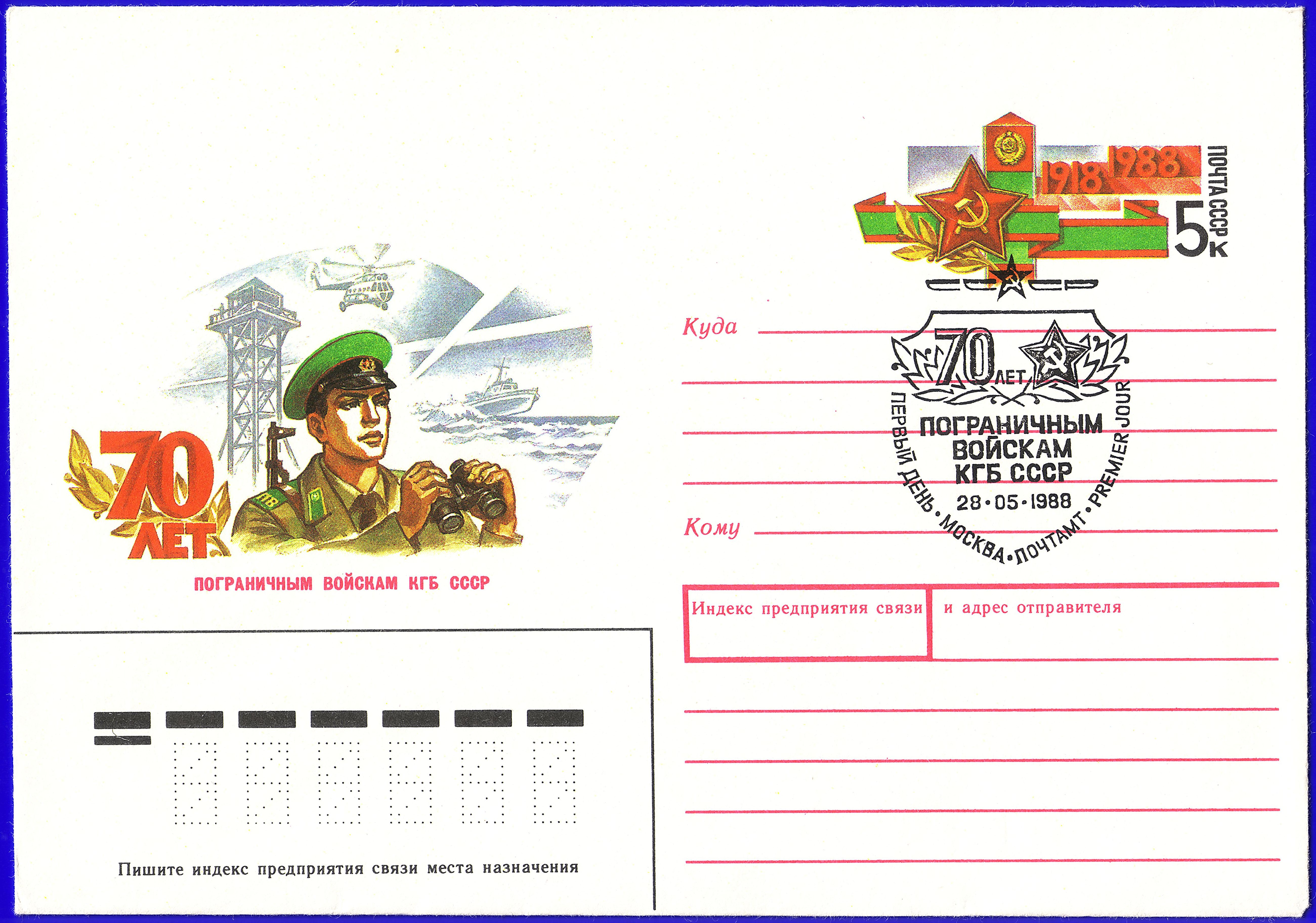
First day of issue cover, 70th anniversary border troops KGB USSR, 1988

Commanders (in chief) – in the meaning of chief, commander, commanding general, supreme commander, or manager, etc. – of the border troops and organs of state security of the USSR and the RF were as follows.

List of the Commanders (in chief)
Time	Name	Rank	Designation of the assignment
1918-1919	Sergey Grigorevich Shamshev	Polkovnik	Chief Main directorate Border troops
1919	Aleksandr Leontevich Pevnev	General-mayor	Military leader Directorate border protection, Secretary Border troops RSFSR
1919-1920	V.A. Stepanov		Chief Directorate border inspection
1920-1921	Vyacheslav Rudolfovich Menzhinsky		Chief Special division VCheKa (Border protection)
1922-1923	Artur Khristyanovich Artuzov	Corps commissar (1935)	Chief division Border troops, division Border protection to Joint State Political Directorate
1923-1925	Yan Kalikstovich Olsky		Chief division Border protection to Joint State Political Directorate
1925-1929	Zinovy Borisovich Kantselson	Commissar stat security 2nd rank	Chief Main directorate Border protection to Joint State Political Directorate
1929	Sergdey Georgievich Velezhev		Chief Main directorate Border protection to Joint State Political Directorate
1929-1931	Ivan Aleksandrovich Vorontsov		Chief Main directorate Border protection to Joint State Political Directorate
1931-1933	Nikolay Mikhaylovits Bystrykh	Commissar stat security 3rd rank	Chief Main directorate Border protection to Joint State Political Directorate
1933-1937	Mikhail Petrovich Frinovsky	Komandarm 1st rank	Chief Main directorate Border protection (from 1934 Border and Internal troops) to Joint State Political Directorate (from 1934 NKVD USSR)
1937-1938	Nikolay Kuzmich Krutsinskin	Komdiv	Chief Main directorate Border and Internal troops to NKVD USSR
1938-1939	Aleksandr Antonovich Kovalyev	Komdiv	Chief Main directorate Border and Internal troops to NKVD USSR
1939-1941	Grigory Grigoryevich Sokolov	General-leytenant	Chief Main directorate Border troops to NKVD USSR
1942-1952	Nikolay Pavlovich Stakhanov	General-leytenant	Chief Main directorate Border troops to NKVD USSR (from 1946 MVD USSR, from 1949 MGB USSR
1952-1956	Pavel Ivanovich Zyryanov	General-leytenant	Chief Border troops to MGB USSR (from 1953 MVD USSR)
1956-1957	Timovey Amvpocievich Strokach	General-leytenant	Chief Main directorate Border and Internal troops to MVD USSR
1957-1972	Pavel Ivanovich Zyryakov	General-polkovnik	Chief Border troops to KGB USSR
1972-1989	Vadim Aleksandrovich Matrosov	General armii	Chief Border troops to KGB USSR
1989-1992	Ilya Yakovlevich Kalinichenko	General-polkovnik	Chief Border troops to KGB USSR, from 1991 Commander in chief Border troops of the CIS
1992-1993	Vladimir Ivanovich Shlyakhtin	General-polkovnik	Commanding general Border troops of the RF
1993-1997	Andrey Ivanovch Nikolaev	General armii	Commander in chief Border troops, from 1994 Director Border Service of the FSB of the RF
1998	Nikolay Nikolayevich Bordyuzha	General-polkovnik	Director Federation Border Service
1998-2003	Konstantin Vasilyevich Totsky	General armii	Director Border Service of the FSB
2003-2013	Vladimir Yegorovich Pronichev	General armii	1st Deputy director of the Russian FSB, head Border service to Russian FSB
April 10, 2013-	Vladimir Grigoryevich Kulishov	General armii	1st Deputy director of the Russian FSB, head Border service to Russian FSB

== See also ==
- Soviet Border Troops
- Chronology of Soviet secret police agencies
