= Aleksandr Panyushkin =

Soviet ambassador and Intelligence Officer

- Александр Панюшкин
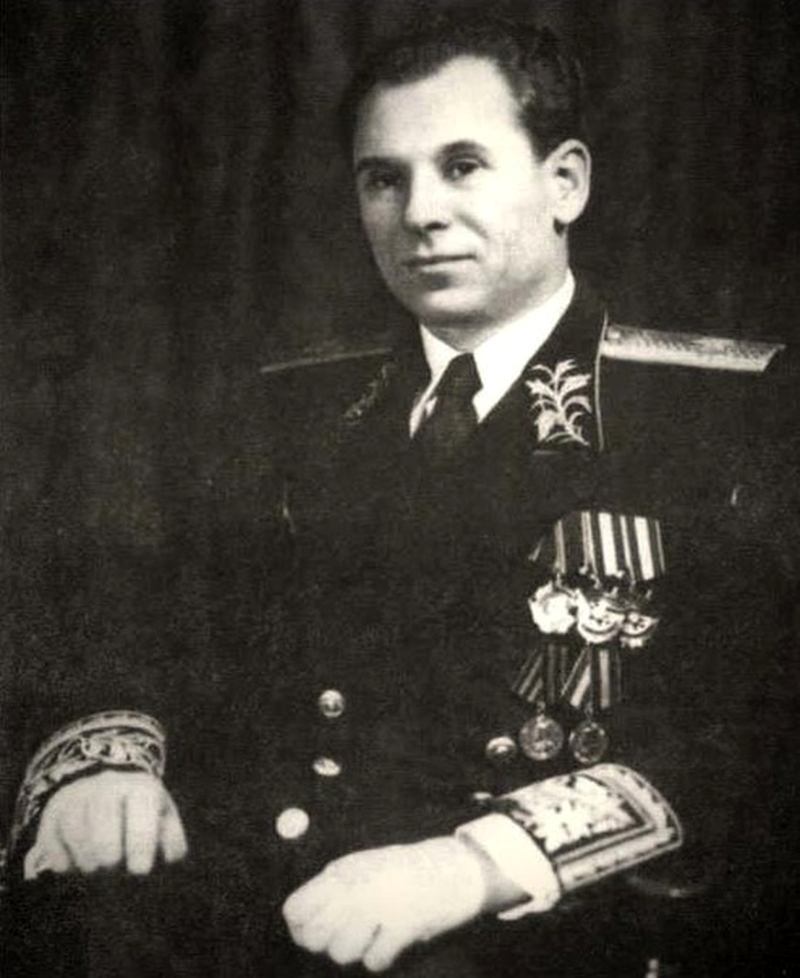

Russian ambassador to the China
- In office 13 June 1952 – 10 March 1953
- Preceded by: Nikolay Roshchin
- Succeeded by: Vasily Kuznetsov
- In office 28 August 1939 – 3 April 1945
- Preceded by: Ivan Bovkun-Luganets
- Succeeded by: Apollon Petrov

Head of the 2nd Chief Directorate of the MVD/First Chief Directorate of the KGB
- In office 17 July 1953 – 23 June 1955
- Preceded by: Vasili Ryasnoy
- Succeeded by: Aleksandr Sakharovsky

Russian ambassador to the United States
- In office 25 October 1947 – 31 December 1947
- Preceded by: Nikolai Novikov
- Succeeded by: Georgy Zarubin

Personal details
- Born: August 2 1900 Samara, Russian Empire
- Died: November 12 1974 Moscow, Soviet Union

Military service
- Allegiance: Soviet Union
- Branch/service: Red Army; OGPU; NKVD; MGB; MVD; KGB
- Years of service: 1920–1955
- Rank: Major general
- Battles/wars: World War II

Aleksandr Semyonovich Panyushkin (Russian: Александр Семёнович Панюшкин; 14 August 1905 – 11 November 1974) was Soviet ambassador to the United States (and simultaneously resident) from 1947, transferring in July 1952 to ambassador to China. He headed the First Chief Directorate (foreign intelligence) of the KGB from July 1953 to June 1955.

== Gallery ==
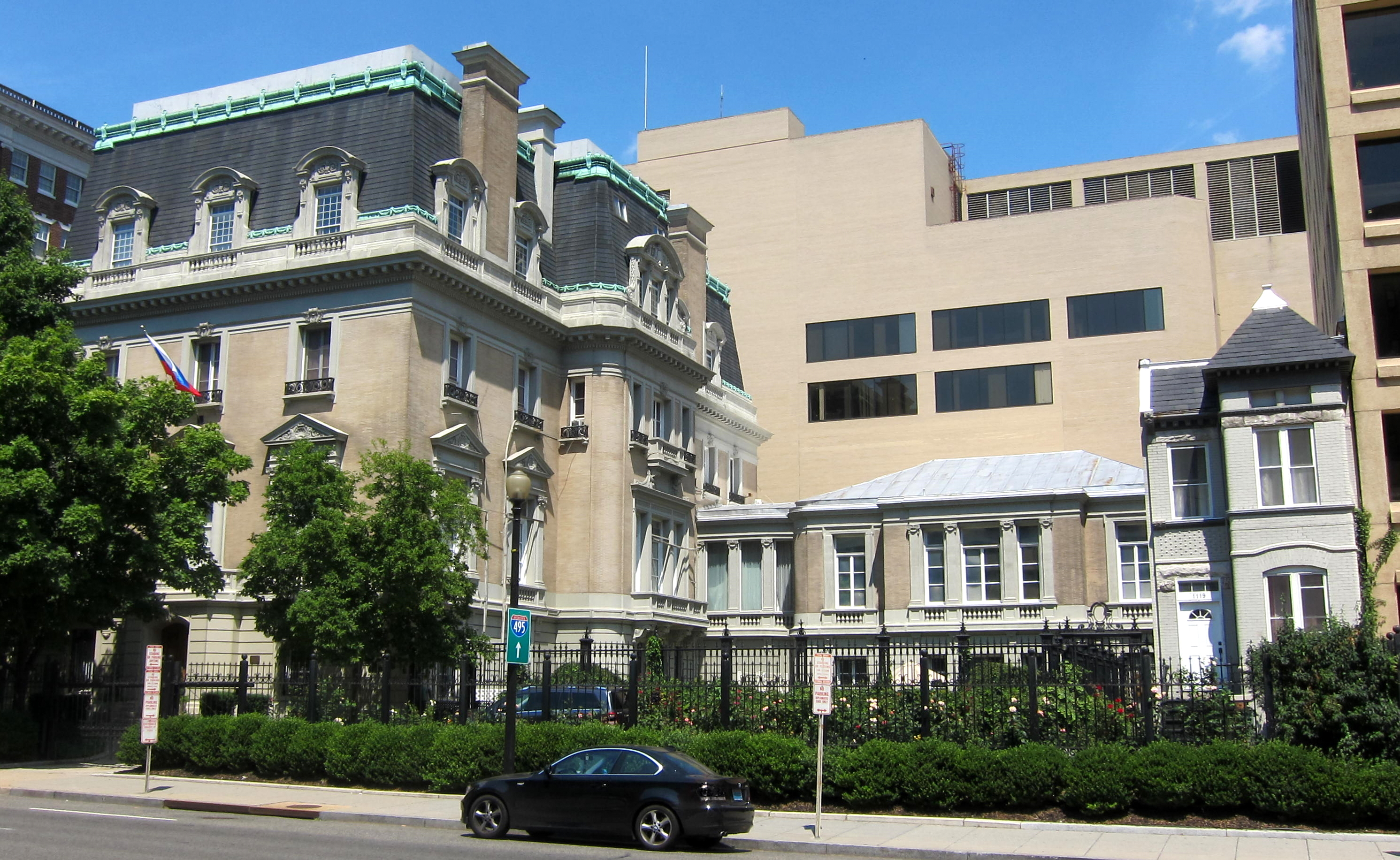
Panyushkin's former residence in Washington, D.C.
