= Willi Lehmann =

Soviet agent in Nazi Germany

Willi (Willy) Lehmann
- Willi Lehmann
- Born: 15 March 1884; Leipzig, German Empire
- Died: 13 December 1942 (aged 58); Berlin, Nazi Germany
- Military career
- Allegiance: Germany; USSR
- Service years: Germany 1911-1942; USSR 1929-1942
- Rank: SS-Hauptsturmführer (captain)
- Nickname: Agent A-201/Breitenbach
- Unit: Gestapo

Willi (Willy) Lehmann (15 March 1884 – 13 December 1942) was a police official and Soviet agent in Nazi Germany.

Lehmann was a criminal inspector and SS-Hauptsturmführer (captain), alias Agent A-201/Breitenbach. During World War II Lehmann was one of the most valuable sources for the NKVD in Germany.

== Biography ==
Lehmann was born into the family of a school teacher. He joined the Berlin Police force in 1911. In 1920, he became deputy division chief of anti-espionage. In 1929, Lehmann began providing information for the NKVD. He initially did this not out of communist sympathy, but because he was married, also had a girlfriend, and needed money. In addition, he had a fondness for horse racing.

In 1933, Lehmann joined the Gestapo. The NKVD code name for the Gestapo was Apotheke (pharmacy). In the Gestapo, Lehmann became director of the division combating Soviet espionage. Thanks to Lehmann's information, the Soviets were able to free their agent Arnold Deutsch, who later recruited Kim Philby.

Lehmann joined the SS in 1934. Toward the end of June, Hermann Göring asked Lehmann to help organize the Röhm Putsch to liquidate opponents of the regime. Lehmann later told the NKVD that the murders he helped organize during the Night of the Long Knives sickened him, albeit they also solidified his position with his Gestapo superiors.

In 1939, Lehmann transferred to the Reich Security Main Office (RSHA), division IV. His responsibility was to prevent the Soviets from spying on the German armaments industry. This position enabled Lehmann to provide valuable information to the Soviets about German armaments. On 19 June 1941, Lehmann reported to the NKVD the exact date and time when the Germans planned to invade the Soviet Union. Operation Barbarossa was launched on 22 June 1941. His message was telegraphed to Beria and Stalin, but the latter dismissed it, like other such reports. That was his last contact, because soon after the invasion all his Soviet contacts left, and all the reserve radios that the German agents used had insufficient range after the capture of Minsk on June 28.

In 1942, with the Germans' discovery of the Red Orchestra, Lehmann was arrested and shot without trial on orders of Heinrich Himmler, who at the same time had the entire matter hushed up.

== Bibliography ==
- Lehrer, Steven (2002). Hitler Sites: A City-by-city Guidebook (Austria, Germany, France, United States). McFarland. p. 224. ISBN 0-7864-1045-0.
- Lehrer, Steven (2006). The Reich Chancellery and Führerbunker Complex: An Illustrated History of the Seat of the Nazi Regime. McFarland. p. 214. ISBN 0-7864-2393-5.
