= German declaration of war on the Soviet Union =

1941 diplomatic note

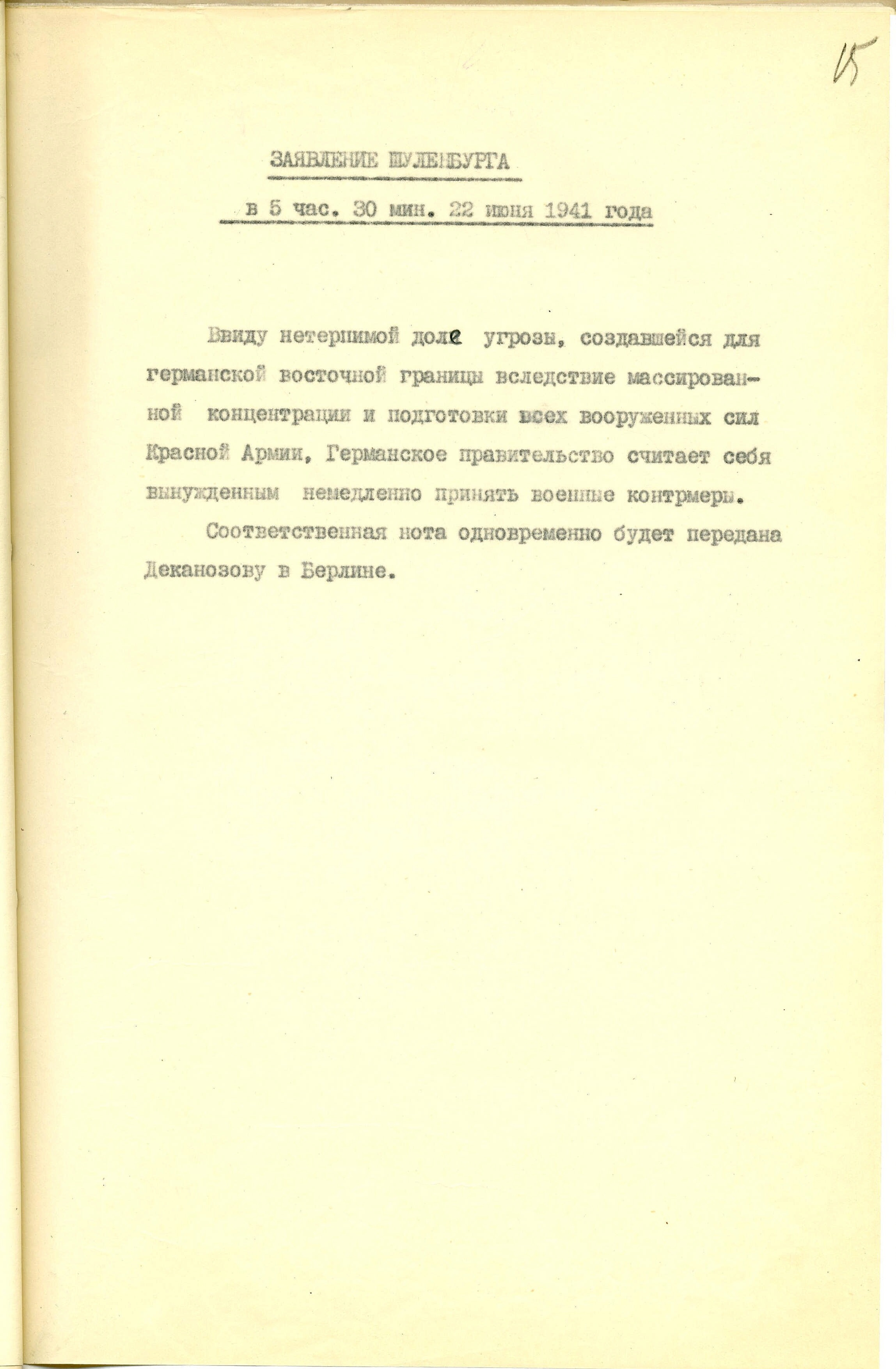
A Russian translation of Schulenburg's declaration dated 5:30 a.m., 22 June 1941. The text reads: "In view of the intolerable threat that arose at the German eastern border as a result of the massive buildup and preparedness of all armed forces of the Red Army, the German government considers itself compelled to immediately take military countermeasures. The corresponding note will be presented to Dekanozov in Berlin at the same time".

The German declaration of war on the Soviet Union, officially Note of the Ministry of Foreign Affairs of Germany to the Soviet government from 21 June 1941 (German: Note des Auswärtigen Amtes an die Sowjetregierung vom 21. Juni 1941), is a diplomatic note presented by German Foreign Minister Joachim von Ribbentrop to Soviet ambassador Vladimir Dekanozov in Berlin on 22 June 1941 at 4 a.m. local time (5 a.m. MSK), informing him about the German invasion of the Soviet Union and the preceding casus belli. Later in the morning of that day German ambassador to the Soviet Union Friedrich-Werner Graf von der Schulenburg presented the note to Soviet Foreign Minister Vyacheslav Molotov in Moscow. On the same day The New York Times published an abridged English translation of the declaration.

The existence of the German declaration of war on the Soviet Union had long been concealed by Soviet authorities, because it mentions the secret protocol to the Molotov–Ribbentrop Pact which was revealed only in 1989. In the Soviet press, the German note was first published in 1991 in the Journal of Military History, although the journal denied the allegation that "in the 1930s and immediately before the war" the Soviet government "ceased all ideological struggle against fascism in order to appease Hitler". The declaration is presently kept in the Archive of Foreign Policy of the Russian Federation.

== Background ==
On 14 June 1941 the Soviet telegraph agency TASS stated that "the USSR, as it follows from its peaceful policy, has observed and intends to comply with the terms of the Soviet–German non-aggression pact, which is why the rumors that the USSR is preparing for war with Germany are false and provocative". On 22 June 1941, in public radio announcements to the Soviet people, Vyacheslav Molotov and Yuri Levitan both said the invasion occurred "without presenting any claims to the Soviet Union, without declaring war". In the public address Molotov said Schulenburg notified him of the invasion only at 5:30 a.m., after it had begun, and called it "perfidy unparalleled in the history of civilized nations". Both during and after World War II the Soviet Union had long officially maintained that the German invasion was undeclared and "perfidious". However, Soviet general Georgy Zhukov in his 1969 memoirs (translated into English in 1971) quoted Molotov as saying "the German government has declared war on us" at a cabinet meeting. The degree of Soviet awareness of German plans and preparedness for the war later became an intensively studied subject.

== Declaration of war ==
The German declaration begins with presenting multiple casus belli. It asserted, among others, that the Communist International embarked on anti-German subversion, sabotage and espionage, contrary to the German–Soviet Boundary and Friendship Treaty which Germany had honored. It further stated that the Soviet Union began to conspire with the United Kingdom against Germany and that there was an offensive buildup of Soviet troops from the Baltic to the Black Sea. As such, it was stated that Hitler has ordered the Wehrmacht to resist this threat with all means at their disposal.

== Reactions ==
Describing ambassador Dekanozov's reaction to the declaration of war, German interpreter Erich Sommer recalled that Dekanozov listened calmly and said "I deeply regret". Then he said "I deeply regret that our leaders, Hitler and Stalin, did not meet in person. Then the whole history of mankind would have taken a different course".

Soviet Foreign Minister Molotov also remained silent while listening to the declaration's read-out by Schulenburg and then said: "This is war. Do you think we deserve that?" Schulenburg was a proponent of the Bismarckian line of avoiding war with Russia and reportedly read the declaration with tears. Schulenburg then said he did not approve of his government's decision (he would later participate in the failed 20 July plot against Hitler). Molotov recorded the German note in his diary, with a timestamp of 5:30 a.m.

The reaction of Soviet leader Joseph Stalin was described particularly in the memoirs of Georgy Zhukov. According to Zhukov, when Molotov reported that Germany had declared war, Stalin "sank down into his chair and lost himself in thought". After a protracted pause Stalin finally allowed the issue of Directive No. 2 on combat readiness at 7:15 a.m. on 22 June. According to admiral Nikolai Kuznetsov, however, Soviet troops were brought into combat readiness already on 21 June, at around 17:00.
