= Rudolf Klement =

German politician

Rudolf Alois Klement (November 4, 1908, in Hamburg – 13 July 1938, in Paris) was a German member of the Trotskyist Left Opposition and Fourth International. Fluent in five languages, he joined Trotsky as his secretary in Büyükada (Prinkipo), Turkey, in 1933, where he learned a sixth language, Russian. Klement accompanied Trotsky to France, where he remained after Trotsky was expelled and ultimately found a home in Mexico. Klement came to lead Trotsky's International Secretariat from France. He was assassinated by the NKVD in Paris in 1938, while preparing a political report that included an investigation of NKVD agent Mark Zborowski, who had infiltrated the Trotskyist movement in France.

== Early life ==
Klement was born in Hamburg, Germany in 1908, his father an architect in the city. A student of philosophy at Hamburg, he spoke five languages. He joined the communist party in his youth, but after expressing interest in Trotskyist political positions, was expelled in 1932. In 1932–33, Klement was recruited by socialist Georg Jungclas (1902–1975) to join the left opposition, and quickly began to learn Russian. Belgian socialist Georges Vereeken described Klement as "Tall and pale, slightly stooped, an unexpressive face, impenetrable." Socialist Gérard Rosenthal wrote that Klement was a large man with sharp features who wore glasses and was short-sighted. Rosenthal described Klement as reserved, precise, tidy, and slow to speak.

== Left Opposition ==
Klement joined Trotsky on the island of Büyükada, a part of Istanbul in Turkey on the Sea of Marmara. Working for Trotsky, he produced German translations of Trotsky's political writings. Klement accompanied Trotsky to France, living with him in Saint-Palais and Ker-Monique, in Barbizon. He also organized political meetings and contacts in Paris. Under surveillance by French police, Klement was arrested in 1935, giving the French government the pretext to expel Trotsky from France in June.

After a short stay in Brussels, Klement returned to France, where he came to direct Trotsky's international secretariat from Paris. Klement became a prolific political writer and translator for the international Left Opposition. As an immigrant and political refugee, Klement's personal safety was difficult to secure, and he used a host of pseudonyms including Frédéric, Ludwig, Walter Steen, Camille, Adolphe, and Roger Bertrand.

After the death of Left Oppositionist Erwin Wolf in 1937 and Trotsky's son Lev Sedov in February 1938, Klement bore greater responsibility for the task of organizing the creation of the Fourth International. Klement served as the founding secretary for the International.

== Investigation into Etienne ==
Prior to his murder, at Trotsky's direction, Klement began a report investigating the assassinations targeting the Trotskyist Left Opposition. A number of Trotskyists suspected Lev Sedov's close associate Mark Zborowski, known in France at that time as Etienne, and later confirmed to be working for the NKVD. Etienne was among the subjects assessed in Klement's report, which was stolen on the Paris metro in the days prior to Klement's death. A Stalinist defector Alexander Orlov subsequently warned Trotsky, anonymously, that a spy named "Mark" was an NKVD agent in Paris. Trotsky did not act on this information, fearing that the letter was written by the NKVD.

Also in Paris at the time were NKVD spies Toman, from Lithuania, and Ramón Mercader, both of whom could have helped steal the documents. Mercader had been introduced to numerous members of Trotsky's circle by Sylvia Ageloff, and would later murder Trotsky in Mexico.

== Death ==
Klement was last seen by his French colleagues on 12 July 1938. According to a later FBI report marked "confidential," American Trotskyist James P. Cannon received a letter from European Trotskyists explaining that Klement had retrieved his mail and that of Etienne from the library at noon on 13 July. The letter further stated that Klement had a scheduled meeting with Etienne that evening at 6pm, but that Klement missed the meeting.

A few days later Klement's colleagues visited his home at Maisons-Alfort, a suburb of Paris, and found a prepared dinner uneaten. Members of the Left Opposition began to receive letters ostensibly written by Klement beginning on 16 July, claiming that Klement had abandoned the Trotskyist movement. The letters were mailed from Perpignan, near the French-Spanish border. On July 26 and 28, Klement's headless body was recovered from the Seine at Meulan-en-Yvelines outside Paris. His murderers, later revealed to be working for the NKVD, were never found.

Klement was the fourth prominent leader of the Left Opposition to be murdered in a period of two years by the NKVD. Others included Erwin Wolf, Ignace Reiss, and Sedov. Trotsky wrote that by assassinating Klement, the Stalinist USSR worked in the aid of imperialism:

Rudolf Klement was a young and as yet little known revolutionist. Nevertheless, the assassination of Klement because he was the secretary of the Fourth International is of profound symbolic significance. Through its Stalinist gangsters imperialism indicates beforehand from what side mortal danger will threaten it in time of war.

Though Klement was known by his colleagues in the Left Opposition to have been preparing a lengthy political report for the Fourth International prior to his death, as recounted by Pierre Naville, his papers disappeared and were never found. Klement's murder would have been ordered by Stalin's Department of Special Tasks.

== See also ==
- Great Purge
- List of Soviet and Russian assassinations (disambiguation)

== Cited works ==
- Bourrinet, Philippe (2017) From the ‘Marx-Lenin-Luxemburg Front’ to the Communistenbond Spartacus (1940–42). Brill, Leiden, p. 442.
- Broué, Pierre (1979) Cahiers Leon Trotsky, no. 1. Translated by Ted Crawford. .
- FBI (1958) Confidential FBI Record No. 124-90080-10051, Agency File No. CR 100-352386-2191. .
- International Committee of the Fourth International (2011) The story of Mark Zborowski: Stalin’s spy in the Fourth International. World Socialist Web Site. .
- Kern, Gary (2013) A Death in Washington: Walter G. Krivitsky and the Stalin Terror. Enigma Books, p. 154-155.
- London, Eric (2021) Sylvia Ageloff and the assassination of Leon Trotsky, part 2. World Socialist Web Site. .
- Lubitz, Wolfgang and Lubitz, Petra (2004) Rudolf Klement. Trotsyana. .
- North, David (2018) On the 80th anniversary of the founding of the Fourth International. World Socialist Web Site. .
- Trotsky, Leon (1938–1939) Writings of Leon Trotsky, 1938- 39. Pathfinder Press (NY); 2nd edition (January 1, 1974); pp. 76–77.
- Weissman, Susan (2011) Mark ‘Etienne’ Zborowski: Portrait of Deception—Part 1. Critique, 39:4, 583-609. .
