= First Chief Directorate =

Department of the Soviet KGB concerned with external intelligence

Первое главное управление КГБ СССР
- First Main Directorate of the KGB of the USSR

Agency overview
- Formed: 13 March 1954
- Dissolved: 25 November 1991
- Superseding agency: Foreign Intelligence Service
- Headquarters: Yasenevel, Moscow, Soviet Union
- Agency executives: Aleksandr Panyushkin, First head; Yevgeny Primakov, Last Head
- Parent agency: Committee for State Security

The First Main Directorate (Russian: Пе́рвое гла́вное управле́ние, romanized: Pérvoye glávnoye upravléniye, IPA: [ˈpʲervəjə ˈɡɫavnəjə ʊprɐˈvlʲenʲɪje], lit. 'First Chief Directive') of the Committee for State Security under the USSR council of ministers (PGU KGB) was the organization responsible for foreign operations and intelligence activities by providing for the training and management of covert agents, intelligence collection administration, and the acquisition of foreign and domestic political, scientific and technical intelligence for the Soviet Union.

The First Chief Directorate was formed within the KGB directorate in 1954, and after the collapse of the Soviet Union became the Foreign Intelligence Service (SVR RF).

The primary foreign intelligence service in Russia and the Soviet Union has been the GRU, a military intelligence organization and special operations force.

== History of foreign intelligence in the Soviet Union ==
From the beginning, foreign intelligence played an important role in Soviet foreign policy. In the Soviet Union, foreign intelligence was formally formed in 1920 as a foreign department of Cheka (Inostrannyj Otdiel—INO), during the Russian Civil War of 1918–1920. On December 19, 1918, the Russian Communist Party (Bolshevik) Central Committee Bureau decided to combine Cheka front formations and the Military Control Units, which were controlled by the Military Revolutionary Committee, and responsible for counter-intelligence activities, into one organ that was named Cheka Special Section (department). The head of the Special Section was Mikhail Sergeyevich Kedrov. The Special Section's task was to run human intelligence: to gather political and military intelligence behind enemy lines, and expose and neutralize counter-revolutionary elements in the Red Army. At the beginning of 1920, the Cheka Special Section had a War Information Bureau (WIB), which conducted political, military, scientific and technical intelligence in surrounding countries. WIB headquarters was located in Kharkiv and was divided in two sections: Western and Southern. Each section had six groups: registration, personal, technical, finance, law, and organization.

WIB had its own internal stations, in Kiev and Odessa. The first had the so-called national section—Polish, Jewish and German.

On December 20, 1920, Felix Dzerzhinsky created the Foreign Department (Innostranny Otdel—INO), made up of the Management office (INO chief and two deputies), chancellery, agents department, visas bureau and foreign sections. In 1922, after the creation of the State Political Directorate (GPU) and connecting it with People's Commisariat for Internal Affairs (NKVD) of the Russian SFSR, foreign intelligence was conducted by the GPU Foreign Department, and between December 1923 and July 1934 by the Foreign Department of Joint State Political Directorate or OGPU. In July 1934, OGPU was reincorporated into NKVD of the Soviet Union, and renamed the Main Directorate of State Security (GUGB). Until October 9, 1936, INO was operated inside the GUGB organization as one of its departments. Then, for conspiracy purposes, People's Commissar of Internal Affairs Nikolai Yezhov, in his order #00362 had introduced a numeration of departments in the GUGB organization, hence Foreign Department or INO of the GUGB became GUGB's Department 7, and later Department 5. By 1941, foreign intelligence was given the highest status and it was enlarged to directorate. The name was changed from INO (Innostranny Otdiel) to INU—Inostrannoye Upravleniye, Foreign Directorate. During the following years, Soviet security and intelligence organs went through frequent organizational changes. From February to July 1941, foreign intelligence was the responsibility of the recently created new administration the People's Commissariat of State Security (NKGB) and was working in its structure as a 1st Directorate and, after the July 1941 organizational changes, as a 1st Directorate of the People's Commisariat for Internal Affairs (NKVD).

It then returned to its former state. Already in April 1943, NKGB dealt with foreign intelligence as a 1st Directorate of NKGB. That state remained until 1946, when all People's Commissariats were renamed Ministries; NKVD was renamed Ministry of Internal Affairs (MVD), and the NKGB was renamed into Ministry of State Security (MGB). From 1946 to 1947, the 1st Directorate of the MGB was conducting foreign intelligence. In 1947, the GRU (military intelligence) and MGB's 1st Directorate was moved to the recently created foreign intelligence agency called the Committee of Information (KI). In the summer of 1948, the military personnel in KI were returned to the Soviet military to reconstitute a foreign military intelligence arm of the GRU. KI sections dealing with the new East Bloc and Soviet émigrés were returned to the MGB in late 1948. In 1951, the KI returned to the MGB, as a First Chief Directorate of the Ministry of State Security.

After the death of longtime Soviet leader Joseph Stalin in March 1953, Lavrenty Beria took over control of the security and intelligence organs, disbanded the MGB and its existing tasks were given to the Ministry of Internal Affairs (MVD) which he was in control of. In the MVD, the foreign intelligence was conducted by the Second Chief Directorate and following the creation of KGB foreign intelligence was conducted by the First Chief Directorate of the Committee for State Security or KGB, subordinate to the council of ministers of the USSR.

== Chiefs of foreign intelligence ==
The first chief of the Soviet foreign intelligence service, Cheka foreign department (Inostranny Otdel—INO), was Yakov Davydov. He headed the foreign department until late 1921, when he was replaced by longtime revolutionary Solomon Mogilevsky. He led INO only for few months, as in 1925 he died in a plane crash.

He was replaced by Mikhail Trilisser, also a revolutionary. Trilisser specialized in tracing secret enemy informers and political spies inside the Bolshevik party. Before becoming INO chief, he led its Section of Western and Eastern Europe. Under Trilisser's management, foreign intelligence had become big professionally and respected by their opponent's services. This period characterized the enlisting of foreign agents, wide use of emigrants for intelligence tasks and organization of a network of independent agents. Trilisser himself was very active, personally traveling to Berlin and Paris for meetings with important agents.

Trilisser left his position in 1930, and was replaced by Artur Artuzov, the former chief of department of counter-intelligence (KRO) and main initiator of the Trust Operation. In 1936, Artuzov was replaced by then State Security Commissar 2nd rank Abram Slutsky. Slutsky was an active participant of the October Revolution and Russian Civil War. He had started work in security organs in 1920 by joining Cheka and later working in OGPU, Economic Department. Then in 1931, he went to serve in OGPU's Foreign Department (INO), and often left the country for Germany, France and Spain, where he participated in the Spanish Civil War. In February 1938, Slutsky was invited to the office of GUGB head komkor Mikhail Frinovsky, where he was poisoned and died.

Slutsky was replaced by Zelman Passov, but soon he was arrested and murdered, his successor Sergey Spigelglas had met with the same fate, and by the end of 1938, he was arrested and murdered. The next chief (acting) of Foreign Department for only three weeks was the experienced NKVD officer Pavel Sudoplatov. Before he became INO head in May, 1938, on Stalin's direct order, he personally assassinated the Ukrainian nationalist leader Yavhen Konovalets.

Later in June 1941, Sudoplatov was placed in charge of the NKVD's Special Missions Directorate, whose principal task was to carry out sabotage operations behind enemy lines in wartime (both it and the Foreign Department had also been used to carry out assassinations abroad). During World War II, his unit helped organize guerrilla bands, and other secret behind-the-lines units for sabotage and assassinations, to fight the Nazis. In February, 1944, Lavrenty Beria (head of NKVD) named Pavel Sudoplatov to also head the newly formed Department S, which united both GRU and NKVD intelligence work on the atomic bomb; he was also given a management role in the Soviet atomic effort, to help with coordination.

After Sudoplatov left his post, he was replaced by Vladimir Dekanozov, before becoming INO head, Dekanozov was Deputy Chairman of the Georgian Council of People's Commissars and after he left his post in 1939 and became the Soviet ambassador in Berlin.

For the next seven years, from 1939 to 1946, the chief of the foreign intelligence department (then 5th Department of the GUGB/NKVD) was a very young NKVD officer and graduate of the first official intelligence school (SHON), Major of State Security Pavel Fitin. Fitin graduated from a program in engineering studies at the Timiryazev Agricultural Academy in 1932 after which he served in the Red Army, then became an editor for the State Publishing House of Agricultural Literature. The All-Union Communist Party (CPSU) selected him for a special course in foreign intelligence.

Fitin became deputy chief of the NKVD's foreign intelligence in 1938, then a year later at the age of thirty-one became chief. The Russian Foreign Intelligence Service credits Fitin with rebuilding the depleted foreign intelligence department after Stalin's Great Terror. Fitin also is credited with providing ample warning of the German Invasion of 22 June 1941 that began the Great Patriotic War. Only the actual invasion saved Fitin from execution for providing the head of the NKVD, Lavrenty Beria, with information General Secretary of the CPSU, Joseph Stalin did not want to believe. Beria retained Fitin as chief of foreign intelligence until the war ended but demoted him.

From June to September 1946, the head of foreign intelligence (MGB 1st directorate), was Lieutenant General Pyotr Kubatkin (born in 1907), when he was replaced by then Lieutenant General Pyotr Fedotov (born in 1900). Before he became head of foreign intelligence, he was working in OGPU/GUGB counter-intelligence and 'Secret Political departments and then he headed the NKVD's counter-intelligence department. From 1949 to 1951, the head of intelligence in the Committee of Information was Sergey Savchenko. Savchenko was born in 1904 and at first he was working as a security guard. He joined Soviet security organs in 1922 and in the 1940s was a top NKVD man in Ukrainian SSR. When Andrey Vyshinsky became Minister for Foreign Affairs and the head of Committee of Information, Savchenko was his deputy and head of foreign intelligence. In 1951, he was replaced by Lt. Gen. Yevgeny Petrovich Pitovranov, longtime secret service worker. Between 1950 and 1951, he was the deputy of MGB head Viktor Abakumov.

On March 5, 1953, MVD and MGB were merged into the MVD by Lavrenty Beria and his people took over all high positions. The foreign intelligence (2nd Chief Directorate of the MVD), was given to Vasili Ryasnoy. After Lavrenty Beria was arrested, along with his people in MVD, Aleksandr Panyushkin became the head of foreign intelligence.

== Early operations ==
In the first years of existence, Soviet Russia did not have many foreign missions that could provide official camouflage for legal outpost of intelligence called residentura, so, foreign department (INO) relied mainly on illegals, officers assigned to foreign countries under false identities. Later when official Soviet embassies, diplomatic offices and foreign missions had been created in major cities around the world, they were used to build legal intelligence post called residentura. It was led by a resident whose real identity was known only to the ambassador.

The first operations of the Soviet intelligence concentrated mainly on Russian military and political emigration organizations. According to Vladimir Lenin's directions, the foreign intelligence department had chosen as his main target the White Guard people (White movement), of which the largest groups were in Berlin, Paris and Warsaw. The intelligence and counter-intelligence department led long so called intelligence games against Russian emigration. As a result of those games, the main representatives of Russian emigration like Boris Savinkov were arrested and sent for many years to prison. Another well known action against a Russian emigration conducted in the 1920s was Operation Trust (Trust Operation). "Trust" was an operation to set up a fake anti-Bolshevik underground organization, "Monarchist Union of Central Russia", MUCR (Монархическое объединение Центральной России, МОЦР). The "head" of the MUCR was Alexander Yakushev (Александр Александрович Якушев), a former bureaucrat of the Ministry of Communications of Imperial Russia, who after the Russian Revolution joined the Narkomat of External Trade (Наркомат внешней торговли), when the Soviets had to allow the former specialists (called "specs", "спецы") to take positions of their expertise. This position allowed him to travel abroad and contact Russian emigrants. MUCR kept the monarchist general Alexander Kutepov (Александр Кутепов), head of a major emigrant force, Russian All-Military Union (Русский общевоинский союз), from active actions and who was convinced to wait for the development of the internal anti-Bolshevik forces.

Among the successes of "Trust" was the luring of Boris Savinkov and Sidney Reilly into the Soviet Union to be arrested. In Soviet intelligence history, the 1930s proceeded as a so-called Era of the Great Illegals. Among others Arnold Deutsch, Theodore Maly and Yuri Modin were officers leading the Cambridge Five case.

One of the biggest successes of Soviet foreign intelligence was the penetration of the American Manhattan Project, which was the code name for the effort during World War II to develop the first nuclear weapons of the United States with assistance from the United Kingdom and Canada. Information gathered in the United States, Great Britain and Canada, especially in USA, by NKVD and NKGB agents then supplied to Soviet physicists, allowed them to carry out the first Soviet nuclear explosion in 1949.

In March 1954, Soviet state security underwent its last major postwar reorganization. The MGB was once again removed from the MVD, but downgraded from a ministry to the Committee for State Security (KGB), and formally attached to the Council of Ministers in an attempt to keep it under political control. The body responsible for foreign operations and intelligence collection activities was First Chief Directorate (FCD).

The first head of FCD was Aleksandr Panyushkin, the former ambassador to the United States and China and former head of Second Chief Directorate in MVD responsible for foreign intelligence. Panyushkin's diplomatic background, however, did not imply any softening in MVD/KGB operational methods abroad. Indeed, one of the first foreign operations personally supervised by Panyushkin was Operation Rhine, the attempted assassination of a Ukrainian émigré leader in West Germany.

In 1956, Panyushkin was succeeded by his former deputy Aleksandr Sakharovsky, who was to remain head of FCD for record period of 15 years. He was remembered in the FCD chiefly as an efficient, energetic administrator. In 1971, Sakharovsky was succeeded by his 53-year-old former deputy Fyodor Mortin, a career KGB officer who had risen steadily through the ranks as a loyal protégé of Sakharovsky. Mortin was on top the FCD only for two years, when, in 1974, he was succeeded by the 50-year-old Vladimir Kryuchkov, who was almost to equal Sakharovsky's record term as head of the FCD. After 14 years in FCD Hq, he was to become chairman of the KGB in 1988. Kryuchkov joined the Soviet diplomatic service, stationed in Hungary until 1959. He then worked for the Communist Party headquarters in Ukraine for eight years before joining the KGB in 1967. In 1988 he was promoted to General of the Army rank and became KGB Chairman. In 1989–1990, he was a member of Politburo. The next and last head of FCD was born on March 24, 1935, in Moscow Leonid Shebarshin.

== First Chief Directorate organization ==
According to published sources, the KGB included the following directorates and departments in 1980s:

- Directorate R: Planning and Analyses
- Directorate S: Illegals
- Directorate T: Scientific and Technical Intelligence
- Directorate K: Counter-Intelligence
- Directorate OT: Operational and Technical Support
- Directorate I: Computers
- Service A: Active Measures
- Directorate RT: Operations in USSR
- First Department: North America
- Second Department: Latin America
- Third Department: United Kingdom, Australia, New Zealand, Scandinavia, Malta
- Fourth Department: East Germany, Austria, West Germany
- Fifth Department: France, Spain, Portugal, Benelux, Switzerland, Greece, Italy, Yugoslavia, Albania, Romania
- Sixth Department: China, Laos, Vietnam, Cambodia, North Korea
- Seventh Department: Thailand, Indonesia, Singapore, Japan, Malaysia, Philippines
- Eight Department: non-Arab Near Eastern countries including Afghanistan, Iran, Turkey, Israel
- Ninth Department: English-speaking Africa
- Tenth Department: French-speaking Africa
- Eleventh Department: liaison with Socialist states
- Fifteenth Department: registry and archives
- Sixteenth Department: signals intelligence and code-breaking
- Seventeenth Department: India, Sri Lanka, Pakistan, Nepal, Bangladesh, Burma
- Eighteenth Department: Arab Near Eastern Countries and Egypt
- Nineteenth Department: Soviet Union Emigres
- Twentieth Department: liaison with Third World states

== Active measures and assassinations ==
"Active measures" (Russian: Активные мероприятия) were a form of political warfare conducted by the Soviet security services to influence the course of world events, "in addition to collecting intelligence and producing politically correct assessment of it". Active measures ranged "from media manipulations to special actions involving various degree of violence". They included disinformation, propaganda, and forgery of official documents. The preparation of forged "CIA" documents which were then shown to third-world leaders was often successful in sowing suspicion.

Active measures included the establishment and support of international front organizations (e.g., the World Peace Council); foreign communist, socialist and opposition parties; wars of national liberation in the Third World; and underground, revolutionary, insurgency, criminal, and terrorist groups. The intelligence agencies of Eastern Bloc and other communist states also contributed to the program, providing operatives and intelligence for assassinations and other types of covert operations.

The Thirteenth Department was responsible for direct action, including assassination and sabotage; at one time it was led by Viktor Vladimirov. They were used both abroad and domestically. Occasionally, KGB assassinated the enemies of the USSR abroad—principally Soviet Bloc defectors, either directly or by aiding Communist country secret services. For instance: the killings of Organization of Ukrainian Nationalists members Lev Rebet and Stepan Bandera by Bohdan Stashynsky in Munich in 1957 and 1959, as well as the unrelated slayings of emigre dissidents like Abdurahman Fatalibeyli, and the surreptitious ricin poisoning of the Bulgarian émigré Georgi Markov, shot with an umbrella-gun of KGB design, in 1978. The defection of assassins like Nikolai Khokhlov and Bohdan Stashynsky severely curtailed such activities however, and the KGB largely stopped assassinations abroad after Stashynsky's defection, although they continued assisting the Eastern European sister services in doing so.

=== First Chief Directorate organization ===
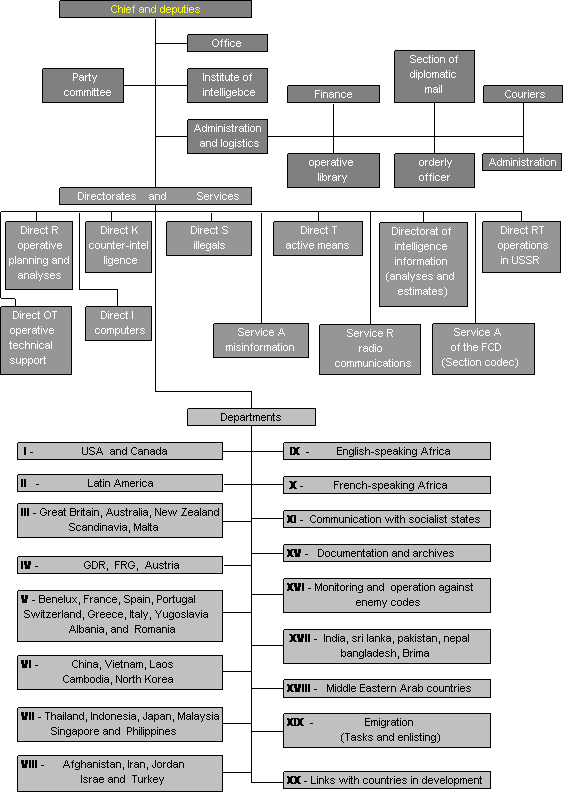
FCD in 1989

=== KGB residents in the United States ===
Washington, DC

- Vasily Zarubin (alias Zubilin): 1942–1944
- Grigori Dolbin: 1946–1948 no refs
- Georgi Sokolov: 1948–1949 no refs
- Alexander Panyushkin (also Soviet ambassador): 1949–1950
- Nikolai Vladykin: 1950–1954 no refs
- Alexander Feklisov (alias Fomin): 1960–1964
- Pavel Lukyanov: 1964–1965
- Boris Aleksandrovich Solomatin: 1966–1968
- Mikhail Polonik: 1968–1975
- Dmitri Yakushkin: 1975–1982
- Stanislav Androsov: 1982–1986
- Yuri B. Shvets: 1985–1987
- Ivan Gromakov: 1987

== FCD residency organization ==
The KGB First Chief Directorate residency was the equivalent of the U.S. Central Intelligence Agency (CIA) station. The chief of residency (Resident) was the equivalent of the CIA's Chief of Station.

A legal resident is a spy who operates in a foreign country under diplomatic cover (e.g., from his country's embassy). He is an official member of the consular staff, such as a commercial, cultural, or military attaché. Thus, he has diplomatic immunity from prosecution and cannot be arrested by the host country if suspected of espionage. The most the host country can do is send him back to his home country. He is in charge of the residency and the personnel. He is also an official contact who well-known people in government can contact in times of crisis.

In 1962, KGB Washington, D.C. Resident Aleksandr Fomin (real name Alexander Feklisov) played a huge role in resolving the Cuban Missile Crisis.

The residency was divided into lines (sections). Each line was responsible for its assigned task of gathering intelligence. For instance, one of the lines was responsible for counterintelligence.

The Line KR (short for "kontrazviedka," counterintelligence) played a big role in the KGB residency, being responsible for counterintelligence and security of the residency and the consulate or embassy that housed the residency. Mainly it used so-called "defensive counterintelligence" tactics. This meant that Line KR attention and force was used for the internal security. Line KR had operational control over residency personnel, surveillance, establishment of any suspicious contacts of residency personnel with citizens of the country where they are staying that they had not reported, checking personal mail, etc. Line KR used such tactics to prevent or uncover anyone from the residency or embassy from being recruited by the enemy, such as the U.S. Federal Bureau of Investigation (FBI).

In 1985, the Line KR's role was increased considerably after CIA counterintelligence officer Aldrich Ames and FBI counterintelligence special agent Robert Hanssen volunteered their services to the KGB residency in Washington, DC.

In return for money, they gave the KGB the names of officers of the KGB residency in Washington, DC, and other places, who cooperated with the FBI and/or the CIA. Line KR officers immediately arrested a number of people, including Major General Dmitri Polyakov, a high-ranking military intelligence officer (GRU). He was cooperating with the CIA and FBI. Ames reported that Colonel Oleg Gordievsky, London resident, had spied for the Secret Intelligence Service (SIS or MI6). Line KR officers arrested many others, whom they sent to Moscow. There they were passed into the hands of the KGB Second Chief Directorate (counterintelligence).

After a quick and secret process, they were sentenced to death. The death sentences were carried out in the Lubyanka Prison. They were buried face down in unmarked graves. Only Oleg Gordievsky was able to escape from the USSR, with SIS help.

Line KR officers did not want to immediately arrest all the KGB personnel identified by Ames and Hanssen because they did not want to draw the attention of the CIA and FBI (which it did). They wanted to run a game of disinformation. But Washington Resident Stanislav Androsov wished to demonstrate his office's effectiveness to his superiors and ordered the immediate arrest of all who helped the CIA and FBI. After those incidents, the security of residencies was increased and the Line KR was assigned more security officers, especially in countries like the United States and Great Britain.

KGB RESIDENCY

The KGB's FCD residency was divided in two parts – Operational Staff and Support Staff

- KGB Resident

Operational staff

- Line PR – collects information about political, economic, and military strategic intelligence, also active measures
- Line KR – counterintelligence and security
- Line X – scientific and technical intelligence, specifically, acquisition of Western technology
- Line N – support to illegals
- Line EM – intelligence on emigres
- Line SK – security and surveillance of the Soviet diplomatic community
- Special Reservists

Support staff

- Driver
- Line OT - operational technical support, including Impulse intercepting station monitoring communications of the local counterintelligence service
- Line RP - signals intelligence
- Line I - computers
- Cipher clerk radio operator
- Secretary/typist
- Accountant

== Heads of Intelligence ==
INO/INU/FCD Head	Service	1920–1991
Yakov Davydov	Foreign Department of Cheka	1920–1921
Ruben Katanyan	Foreign Department of Cheka	1921–1921
Yakov Davydov	Foreign Department of Cheka	1921–1921
Solomon Mogilevsky	Foreign Department of Cheka/GPU	1921–1922
Mikhail Trilisser	Foreign Department of GPU/OGPU	1922–1929
Stanislav Messing	Foreign Department of OGPU	1929–1931
Artur Artuzov	Foreign Department of OGPU/GUGB-NKVD	1931–1935
Abram Slutsky	7th Department of GUGB-NKVD	1935–1938
acting Sergey Spigelglas	5th Department of GUGB-NKVD	1938
Zelman Passov	5th Department of NKVD 1st Directorate (UGB)	1938
acting Pavel Sudoplatov	5th Department of GUGB-NKVD	1938
Vladimir Dekanozov	5th Department of GUGB-NKVD	1938–1939
Pavel Fitin	5th Department of GUGB-NKVD / 1st Directorate of NKVD/NKGB/MGB	1939–1946
Pyotr Kubatkin	1st Directorate of MGB	1946
Pyotr Fedotov	1st Directorate of MGB/Committee of Information	1946–1949
Sergey Savchenko	Committee of Information	1949–1953
Yevgeny Pitovranov	1st Chief Directorate of MGB	1953
Vasili Ryasnoy	2nd Chief Directorate of the MVD	1953
Alexander Korotkov	2nd Chief Directorate of the MVD	1953
Aleksandr Panyushkin	2nd Chief Directorate of the MVD/1st Chief Directorate of KGB	1953–1955
Aleksandr Sakharovsky	1st Chief Directorate of KGB	1955–1971
Fyodor Mortin	1st Chief Directorate of KGB	1971–1974
Vladimir Kryuchkov	1st Chief Directorate of KGB	1974–1988
acting Vadim Kirpichenko	1st Chief Directorate of KGB	1988–1989
Leonid Shebarshin	1st Chief Directorate of KGB	1989–1991
Vyacheslav Gurgenov	1st Chief Directorate of KGB	1991
Yevgeny Primakov	1st Chief Directorate of KGB/Central Intelligence Service	1991

== See also ==
- GRU
- Mitrokhin Archive – Handwritten copies of secret documents made by KGB archivist Vasili Mitrokhin and given to MI6 in 1991.
- Special Activities Division
