= Artur Artuzov =

Soviet intelligence officer (1891-1937)

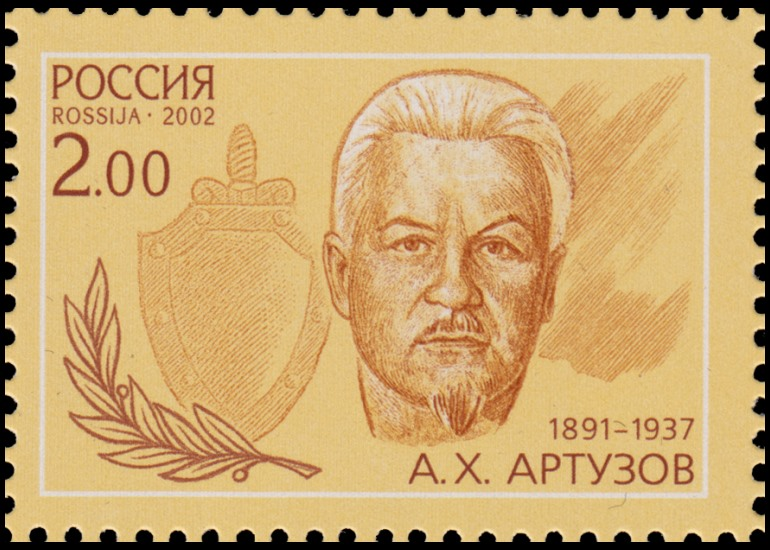
- Image of Artuzov on a commemorative Russian stamp, 2002

Head of the foreign department of OGPU/GUGB-NKVD
- In office July 31, 1931 – May 21, 1935
- Preceded by: Mikhail Trilisser
- Succeeded by: Abram Slutsky

Personal details
- Born: Artur Eugene Leonard Fraucci; 18 February 1891 Tver region, Russian Empire
- Died: 21 August 1937 (aged 46) Moscow, USSR
- Cause of death: Execution
- Party: CPSU (1917–1937)
- Occupation: Intelligence officer
- Known for: Role in the "Trust"

Military service
- Allegiance: Russian Soviet Federative Socialist Republic (1917–1922); Soviet Union (1922–1937)
- Branch/service: Red Army (1918–1919); Cheka; GPU; OGPU; NKVD
- Rank: Corps Commander
- Battles/wars: Russian Civil War

Artur Khristyanovich Artuzov (name at birth: Artur Eugene Leonard Fraucci) (Russian: Арту́р Христиа́нович Арту́зов (Фра́учи); 18 February 1891 – 21 August 1937) was a leading figure in the Soviet international intelligence and counter-intelligence and security officer and spymaster of the Soviet Union in the 1920s and 1930s.

== Early life ==
Artuzov's father was Italian-Swiss and employed as a cheesemaker; his mother was Estonian-Latvian. Artuzov studied metallurgy at St. Petersburg Polytechnical Institute. Since childhood he was familiar with the Bolshevik revolutionaries Nikolai Podvoisky and Mikhail Kedrov, who were the husbands of his mother's sisters.

He started distributing illegal revolutionary literature as a teenager in 1906. In May 1909 he graduated with a gold medal from the Novgorod classical men's gymnasium and entered the metallurgical department of the Petrograd Polytechnic Institute, from which he graduated with honors in February 1917, after which he worked as a design engineer in the Metallurgical Bureau of Professor Vladimir Grum-Grzhimailo.

In August 1917, after returning from a business trip to Nizhny Tagil, he decided to leave the profession of a design engineer and began working in the Office for the Demobilization of the Army and Navy. In December 1917 he became a Bolshevik and after the Russian Revolution he joined the Communist Party.

From December 1917 to March 1918 he worked as secretary of the Audit Commission of the People's Commissariat for Military Affairs in Vologda and Arkhangelsk, and from March to August 1918 he was the head of the partisan detachment of conscripts on the Northern Front. Then he successively held the positions of head of the military information bureau of the Moscow Military District and head of the active part of the Military Control Department of the Revolutionary Military Council of the Republic.

== Spy career ==
=== 1919–1929 ===
In 1918 he joined the Red Army and fought against the White Army during the Russian Civil War. The following year he joined the All-Russian Extraordinary Commission for Combating Counter-Revolution and Sabotage (Cheka). His uncle, Dr. Mikhail Kedrov, was an associate of Vladimir Lenin and was the head of the Cheka's "Special Department," which monitored the Red Army. On 18 July 1921 Artuzov was awarded the Order of the Red Banner by the Presidium of the All-Russian Central Executive Committee.

In the 1920s, Artuzov headed the Cheka's counterintelligence arm, KRO. In 1925 he wrote an operational manual called ABC of Counterintelligence, which recommended using ideologically based operations. An example of this strategy was Operation Trust, which lasted from 1922 to 1927, a series of phony monarchist/counter-revolutionary front organizations that monitored the activities of genuine activists.

Similarly, his Operation Syndicate-2 resulted in the arrest of Boris Savinkov, the head of the anti-Soviet emigrant organization "People's Union for the Defense of Motherland and Freedom". Another success of Artuzov was the arrest in 1925 of Sidney Reilly. Artuzov was the initiator and direct developer of Operation Tarantella.

Operation Trust was shut down in 1927, leading former Trust agent Alexander Kutepov to discover its true origins. Kutepov organized several terrorist operations inside the Soviet Union in retaliation, leading to Artuzov's dismissal in November. He was placed as second deputy assistant of the Secret Operations Directorate of OGPU, the Cheka's replacement, which was headed by Genrikh Yagoda, a protege of Joseph Stalin. Artuzov, a consummate professional spy, often clashed with the less extensively trained Yagoda.

Artuzov replaced Mikhail Trilisser as deputy head of the INO, the foreign intelligence directorate within OGPU, in October 1929. Trilisser had complained about Yagoda, his boss, at a Party meeting. Artuzov defended Yagoda and insisted that his senior position meant that he could only be held to account by the Party's Central Committee. Trilisser was dismissed and Artuzov promoted in his stead.

=== 1930s ===
Encouraged by the success of Operation Trust, Artuzov spearheaded Operation Tarantella in 1930. A deception campaign aimed against British foreign intelligence, "the operation's broad aim was to convince London that industrialisation of the Soviet Union was a huge success."

Artuzov was promoted to head the INO in 1931. Among his priorities was development of training courses for operatives; this was especially important because the organization was moving away from operations conducted under diplomatic cover, in favor of "illegal" operations.

During the command of Artuzov, the INO OGPU carried out dozens of operations, during which dozens of personnel and hundreds of agents were involved. An important aspect of the work of Soviet intelligence was the German work. Artuzov's employees created a network of agents that supplied the Soviet leadership with valuable information about the events that took place in the National Socialist Party of Germany, as well as about the activities of a number of state bodies and special services. During Artuzov's work in the Foreign Department of the OGPU, the famous illegal intelligence officers Fyodor Karin, Arnold Deutsch, Theodor Malli, Dmitry Bystroletov and others worked for Soviet intelligence.

In April and May 1934, Artuzov worked with Stalin to subsume the Fourth intelligence directorate (military intelligence) into the INO, citing the recent collapse of the Fourth's HUMINT efforts. In the process of this transition—under which Artuzov was charged with reviving the Fourth's capabilities—he was made deputy director of the Fourth directorate while also staying on as head of the INO. Later that year, both organizations would become part of the Main Directorate of State Security (GUGB)—itself under the umbrella of NKVD, the People's Commissariat of Internal Affairs.

According to Walter Krivitsky, who was working for Soviet military intelligence at the time, Artuzov accidentally angered Joseph Stalin at a meeting of the Politburo in June 1934, when they were discussing the possibility of an alliance with Poland against the rising threat from Nazi Germany. Artuzov correctly forecast that the Polish government would not consider the proposition. Artuzov stepped down as head of INO on 21 May 1935, and was appointed deputy head of military intelligence, the GRU. This was one of several personnel changes following dismissal of the long-serving head of the GRU, Yan Karlovich Berzin, which may have reflected Stalin's anxiety about Nazi Germany and Japanese expansion.

In 1936, Artuzov helped supervise Operation X, a program to arm the Republicans in the Spanish Civil War.

== Purge and execution ==
Artuzov was sacked on 11 January 1937, as the author of a draft telegram to the Chinese warlord Zhang Xueliang, who had kidnapped the nationalist leader and de facto ruler of China, Chiang Kai-shek, which urged the warlord to kill Chiang. Mao Zedong, leader of the Chinese communists, wanted Chiang dead, to increase the chances of a communist victory in China, but Stalin's prime concern was to avoid a Japanese invasion of Siberia. He ordered Mao to secure Chiang's release.

Artuzov was transferred to the archive department of the NKVD and commissioned to write a history of the organisation. In March 1937, again according to Walter Krivitsky, he tried to save himself when the new head of the NKVD, Nikolai Yezhov, began a purge of officers associated with the former NKVD boss, Genrikh Yagoda, by denouncing both Yagoda and Abram Slutsky, Artuzov's successor as head of the Foreign Department. Slutsky retaliated by denouncing Artuzov.

Artuzov was arrested on 13 May 1937, charged with "espionage", "terror", "participation in a counter-revolutionary conspiratorial organization within the NKVD". On 8 July 1937 he was dismissed from his position.

The investigation was led by Ya. A. Deich, head of the Secretariat of the NKVD. His execution was approved by Stalin, Stanisław Kosior, Vyacheslav Molotov, Lazar Kaganovich, and Kliment Voroshilov on 20 August 1937; he was shot on 21 August 1937. His ashes were buried in the grave of unclaimed ashes No. 1 of the crematorium of the Donskoy cemetery.

== Legacy ==
Much of Artuzov's work developing Soviet human intelligence was undone by Stalin's purges of the NKVD during the Great Terror of 1936–1938, with more than half of the INO's operatives executed or sent to labor camps.

On 7 March 1956 he was posthumously rehabilitated by the All-Union Military Commission of the USSR.

== See also ==
- Commanders of the border troops USSR and RF
