= Pavel Sudoplatov =

Soviet spy (1907–1996)

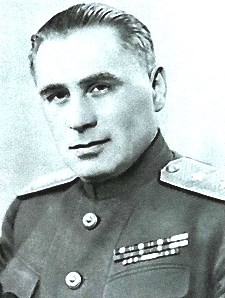
- Pavel Sudoplatov in NKGB/MGB lieutenant general uniform

Acting Head of the 5th Department of GUGB-NKVD
- In office June 9, 1938 – November 2, 1938
- Preceded by: Zelman Passov
- Succeeded by: Vladimir Dekanozov

Personal details
- Born: Pavel Anatolyevich Sudoplatov; July 7, 1907 Melitopol, Russian Empire (present-day Melitopol, Ukraine)
- Died: September 24, 1996 (aged 89) Moscow, Russia
- Nickname: Viktor

Military service
- Allegiance: Russian Soviet Federative Socialist Republic (1919–1922); Soviet Union (1922–1953)
- Branch/service: Red Army; Cheka; GPU; OGPU; NKVD; MGB; MVD
- Years of service: 1919–1953
- Rank: Lieutenant General
- Battles/wars: Russian Civil War; Spanish Civil War; World War II; Cold War

Pavel Anatolyevich Sudoplatov (Russian: Павел Анатольевич Судоплатов; Ukrainian: Павло́ Анато́лійович Судопла́тов, romanized: Pavlo Anatoliiovych Sudoplatov; July 7, 1907 – September 24, 1996) was a senior Soviet official in the intelligence services of the former Soviet Union whose career spanned over 34 years in the different intelligence branches of the Soviet Armed Forces.

Sudoplatov was involved in several major Soviet intelligence operations, including the assassination of Leon Trotsky in 1940 in Mexico, as well as Operation Scherhorn, a Soviet deception operation conducted during World War II. He also provided management of the Soviet espionage efforts which obtained information about the feasibility of the atomic bomb from the Manhattan Project. His autobiography, Special Tasks, published in 1994, made him well known outside the Soviet Union and provided a detailed account of Soviet intelligence and Soviet internal politics during his years at the top. However, some of his claims have been challenged by historians.

== Early life and career ==
Sudoplatov was born in Melitopol, Taurida Governorate, Russian Empire (in present-day Zaporizhzhia Oblast, Ukraine), to a Russian mother and a Ukrainian father, and was baptized into the Russian Orthodox Church. In 1919, at the age of 12, he left home and joined a Bolshevik Red Army regiment near Melitopol. He served in combat against both the loyalist White Army and the nationalist Ukrainian People's Republic during the Russian Civil War.

Sudoplatov identified himself as Ukrainian.

=== Functions in political police and intelligence apparatus ===
Sudoplatov was recruited into the Cheka in 1921, at the age of 14, and was promoted to the Secret Political Department (SPO) of the Ukrainian State Political Directorate (OGPU) in 1927.

He transferred to the Soviet OGPU in 1933, moved to Moscow and after became an "illegal", operating under cover in a number of European countries.

=== Assassination of Yevhen Konovalets ===
On May 23, 1938, in Rotterdam, Sudoplatov assassinated Yevhen Konovalets, the leader of the Organization of Ukrainian Nationalists, by giving him a box of chocolates containing a bomb.

According to Sudoplatov, the order to assassinate Konovalets came directly from Joseph Stalin, who had personally told him: "This is not just an act of revenge, although Konovalets is an agent of German fascism. Our goal is to behead the movement of Ukrainian fascism on the eve of the war and force these "gangsters" to annihilate each other in a struggle for power."

After delivering the bomb to Konovalets, Sudoplatov calmly walked away and waited nearby to verify that it had successfully detonated. He then walked to Rotterdam's railway station and boarded a train for Paris. Soon after, with the assistance of the NKVD, Sudoplatov was smuggled into the Second Spanish Republic, where he briefly served in combat against Francisco Franco's Nationalists.

His sudden disappearance made both the Dutch police and the OUN immediately suspect Sudoplatov of Konovalets' murder. Consequently, a photograph of Sudoplatov and Konovalets together was distributed to every OUN unit. According to Sudoplatov, "[i]n the 1940s, SMERSH [...] captured two guerrilla fighters in Western Ukraine, one of whom had this photo of me on him. When asked why he was carrying it, he replied, 'I have no idea why, but the order is if we find this man to liquidate him'".

=== Near-purge ===
In the fall of 1938, he was appointed acting director of the Foreign Department of the NKVD (the successor organization of the OGPU) after the purging of the previous head, during the Great Purges, which later culminated in the fall of Nikolai Yezhov (who was eventually replaced by Lavrentiy Beria) and other senior NKVD officials. Sudoplatov himself was able to avoid being immediately purged at this time, as Yezhov's order to promote him to a senior role had not been signed yet. Though a meeting was proposed to expel him from the part in January 1939, this did not take place.

=== Assassination of Leon Trotsky ===
In March 1939, Stalin promoted Sudoplatov to deputy director of the Foreign Department, and placed him in charge of organizing the assassination of Trotsky, which was carried out in August 1940.

=== Sabotage ===
In June 1941, Sudoplatov was placed in charge of the NKVD's Administration for Special Tasks, the principal task of which was to carry out sabotage operations behind enemy lines in wartime (both it and the Foreign Department had also been used to carry out assassinations abroad). During World War II, his unit helped organize guerrilla bands, and other secret behind-the-lines units for sabotage and assassinations, to fight the Nazis.

=== Peace offer 1941 ===
In late July 1941, under the orders of Lavrentiy Beria, Sudoplatov met with the ambassador of Axis-allied Bulgaria. Sudoplatov asked the ambassador if Hitler would end the invasion of the Soviet Union in exchange for giving Germany a large amount of Soviet territory. Sudoplatov later said that he understood the offer to be a ruse, although other evidence suggests that Stalin was open to a peace settlement.

=== "Department S" and atomic bomb ===
In February 1944, Beria allegedly named Sudoplatov to head the newly formed Department S, which, according to Sudoplatov, united both the army intelligence (GRU) and NKVD intelligence in an effort to aid and secure the Soviet atomic bomb project. Sudoplatov's exact role and contribution, as well as his claim that he "engineered the theft of atomic secrets from the United States with the aid of four eminent scientists" is under discussion, since, according to the Foreign Intelligence Service of Russia, Department S was established in September 1945, and Sudoplatov had limited access to the Soviet atomic effort from that time until October 1946 and did not have any access to foreign agents tasked with collecting the atomic intelligence. In 1995, the Federal Bureau of Investigation (F.B.I.) conducted an investigation and declared that it "is not in possession of any credible evidence that would suggest that Neils [sic] Bohr, Enrico Fermi, Robert Oppenheimer, or Leo Szilard engaged in any espionage activity on behalf of any foreign power [...], the F.B.I. has classified information available that argues against the conclusions reached by the author of 'Special Tasks.' The F.B.I., therefore, considers such allegations to be unfounded".

=== MGB ===
In the summer of 1946, Sudoplatov was removed from both posts, and in September he was placed in charge of another group at the newly renamed MGB, one which was supposed to plan sabotage actions in Western countries. In November 1949, he was given a temporary job helping suppress a guerrilla Ukrainian nationalist movement in Ukraine that was a relic of World War II.

=== MVD ===
In the spring of 1953, around the time of Stalin's death, Sudoplatov was appointed to head the yet-again renamed MVD's Bureau of Special Tasks, which was responsible for sabotage operations abroad, and ran networks of "illegals" who were given the task of preparing attacks on military establishments in NATO countries, in the event that NATO attacked the Soviet Union.

== Arrest, trial and imprisonment ==
After the fall of Lavrentiy Beria, Sudoplatov was arrested on August 21, 1953, as his alleged collaborator in crimes. He feigned madness to avoid being executed with Beria and so was tried only in 1958. He was accused, among other things, of involvement with Grigory Mairanovsky's laboratory of death:

As established [during the court trial], Beria and his accomplices committed terrible crimes against humanity: they tested deadly poisons, which caused agonizing death, on live humans. A special laboratory, which was established for experiments on the action of poisons on living humans, worked under the supervision of Sudoplatov and his deputy Eitingon from 1942 to 1946. They demanded he provide them only with poisons that had been tested on humans [...].

He was sentenced to 15 years in prison. After serving the full term (he was housed with a number of Stalin's top assistants who were also imprisoned), he was duly released in August 1968.

== Later life and memoirs ==
Sudoplatov worked for some time as a German and Ukrainian translator and also published, under the pen name "Anatoliy Andreev", three books based on his activities during World War II.

After an extensive letter writing campaign, including a publicity effort during the glasnost era of the late 1980s, he was finally rehabilitated and cleared of wrongdoing on 10 January 1992, after the December 1991 dissolution of the Soviet Union. In his memoirs, he wrote with bitterness about his rehabilitation:

The Soviet Union – to which I devoted every fiber of my being and for which I was willing to die; for which I averted my eyes from every brutality, finding justification in its transformation from a backward nation into a superpower; for which I spent long months on duty away from Emma and the children; whose mistakes cost me fifteen years of my life as a husband and father – was unwilling to admit its failure and take me back as a citizen. Only when there was no more Soviet Union, no more proud empire, was I reinstated and my name returned to its rightful place.

In 1994, Sudoplatov's autobiography, Special Tasks, based partly on Sudoplatov's own memories and partly on some KGB documents, written with the help of his son Anatoliy and two American writers, was published and caused a considerable uproar. In addition to extensive details of many Soviet intelligence-operations during Sudoplatov's career and a similarly-extensive discussion of the political machinations in the intelligence services and the Soviet government, it claimed that a number of Western scientists who had worked on the atomic bomb project, such as Robert Oppenheimer, although not recruited agents for the Soviets, had provided important information. The American media initially treated the revelation as a scoop, but the Russian Foreign Intelligence Service and the American Federal Bureau of Investigation would later dispute such claims, while American and Russian scientists and historians have dismissed them.

Sudoplatov died on September 24, 1996 and was buried next to his wife in the New Donskoy Cemetery in Moscow.

== Honors and awards ==
On 1998, Russian president Boris Yeltsin signed a decree on the restoration of the state awards awarded to Sudoplatov in connection to the restoration of Sudoplatov's military rank of lieutenant general.

Order of Lenin (30 April 1946)
Order of the Red Banner, thrice (13 November 1937, 16 June 1941, 3 November 1944)
Order of Suvorov, 2nd class (5 November 1944)
Order of the Patriotic War, 1st class (24 February 1945)
Order of the Red Star, twice (26 April 1940, 20 September 1943)
Medal "To a Partisan of the Patriotic War", 1st class
Medal "For the Defence of Moscow" (1944)
Medal "For the Defence of the Caucasus" (1944)
Medal "For the Victory over Germany in the Great Patriotic War 1941–1945" (1945)
Medal "For the Victory over Japan" (1945)
Jubilee Medal "30 Years of the Soviet Army and Navy" (1948)
Medal "In Commemoration of the 800th Anniversary of Moscow" (1947)

- Honorary State Security Officer (4 February 1942)
- Honored Worker of the Ministry of Internal Affairs

== Legacy ==
- There are streets named after Sudoplatov in the city of Smolensk and the town of Gagarin. There is also a plaque honoring him in Smolensk.
- In 2022, during the Russian occupation of Zaporizhzhia Oblast as part of the 2022 Russian invasion of Ukraine, a monument to Sudoplatov was erected in the city of Melitopol. The occupation authorities also renamed the city's Dmytro Dontsov Street to Sudoplatov Street.
- Later in 2022, pro-Russian collaborators in Russian-occupied Zaporizhzhia Oblast raised the Pavel Sudoplatov Battalion led by Yevgeny Balitsky, the Russian-installed governor whose son also plays a prominent role in the militia.
