= Alekhine's gun (disambiguation) =

"Alekhine's gun" refers to a formation in chess. It may also refer to:

- Alekhine's Gun (video game), a 2016 video game
- Alekhine's Gun (band), a heavy metal band from New York
