= Directorate of Special Departments within NKVD USSR =

- Управление Особых Отделов при НКВД СССР; УОО НКВД СССР; Special Departments or OO

Military counter-intelligence overview
- Formed: 17 July 1941
- Preceding agencies: 3rd NKO Directorate; 3rd NKVMF (Navy) Directorate; 3rd NKVD Department
- Dissolved: 14 April 1943
- Superseding Military counter-intelligence: Main Directorate of Counterintelligence within USSR People's Defence Commissariate
- Type: Military counter-intelligence, Secret Military Police
- Jurisdiction: Soviet Union (World War II)
- Headquarters: Lubyanka (4th and 6th floors) Moscow, and later (Kuibyshev) Soviet Union
- Employees: 387 (in August 1941, in Moscow center) in May 1942 227-man
- Minister responsible: Lavrentiy Beria
- Military counter-intelligence executive: Viktor Abakumov
- Parent department: NKVD, NKVMF part till 1.11.1942
- Parent Military counter-intelligence: Council of People's Commissars

Directorate of Special Departments within NKVD USSR. rus. Управление Особых Отделов при НКВД СССР, (UOO) was an organization created in 1941 to conduct military counterintelligence under one command. The UOO was created to take back control from the retreating Red Army after the German invasion of the USSR and to counter German espionage efforts in the Soviet Armed forces. The principle tactic used by the UOO on Red Army personnel was intimidation and terror.

== History of Military Counterintelligence in Soviet Russia ==
At the beginning of the newly created VCheka, the responsibility for civilian and military counterintelligence fell on the Counterintelligence Bureau or KRB. Created on January 12, 1918, they were responsible for combating internal and external espionage in military and civilian activity.

From May 1918, the KRB was changed and acted as a Department for Fighting with Espionage in the framework of the Counter-Revolution and Sabotage Division within the VCheka, under the leadership of Yakov Blumkin. The department existed only until July 6, when the fight against espionage was taken over by the newly formed Military Sub-Branch, headed by Janushevski. On December 19, 1918, it was reformed again. By combining Military Sub-branch with the 1st Department (responsible for military counterintelligence) of the Registration Directorate or Riegistrupr (RU) by the Field Staff Revolutionary War Council (RWSR) and renamed to the "Military Division".

The final name change came days later when the VCheka Military Division was renamed to VCheka Special Department or (OO), with the standard responsibilities as military and civilian secret police. In the beginning, the Special Department was also responsible for:

1. fighting against counter-revolution and sabotage in the ranks of the Red Army
2. protecting newly created state borders
3. counterintelligence and counter-espionage duties in those military and civilian institutions which are essential to the economy and military industry
4. Surveillance of senior commanders,
5. running foreign and domestic human intelligence networks, mainly in areas occupied by White Army and Entente intervention forces.

In charge of VCheka and its successors (GPU NKVD RSFSR/OGPU CNK), the special department was very high ranking amongst leaders of Lenin's and Stalin's secret police.

People such as the old Bolsheviks Mikhail Sergeevich Kedrov and Felix Dzerzhinsky at the time the VCheka chairman and also from March 30, 1919, from the NKVD RSFSR.Vyacheslav Menzhinsky, future OGPU chairman, Yakov Agranov then chief of Special Department 16th Section later first originating from the GUGB NKVD USSR, and 1st deputy to NKVD head Genrikh Yagoda. In charge of the OO 14 Section, was Solomon Mogilevsky who later became head of the Foreign Department.

=== Reorganization of Soviet Security Services ===
Joseph Stalin began to exert control over Red Army commanders by terror and repressions. He did this by consolidating his power over USSR Secret Services. Before the consolidation of NKGB was renamed back to NKVD, on June 27, 1941, in response to reports of unit disintegration in battle and desertion from the ranks in the Soviet Red Army, the 3rd NKO Directorate (military counterintelligence in Soviet Army) of the USSR. The Narkomat of Defense issued a directive creating mobile barrier forces composed of NKVD personnel to operate on roads, railways, forests, etc. to catch 'deserters and suspicious persons'. These forces were given the acronym SMERSH (from the Russian Smert shpionam – Death to spies). But those self-named mobile barrier forces didn't have the workforce nor manpower as the one introduced by Stalin's famous Order No. 227 and creation of Barrier troops, which were on a massive scale never seen before in the USSR.

The notorious NKVD and newly created NKGB were the main repression tools in Stalin's police state. He started by consolidating Soviet security departments under one leader and one agency. In July 1941, the People's Commissariat of State Security, headed by Vsevolod Merkulov, was liquidated and its main units, the I, II, and III Directorates, supporting departments, and sections were put under NKVD control. Lavrentiy Beria was still NKVD chief with Merkulov as his first deputy. To avoid putting Beria in such a powerful position, he surrounded the NKVD head with deputies and made each of them responsible for a field of NKVD work. They officially answered directly to Beria, the People's Commissar for Internal Affairs but on numerous occasions were called by Stalin's personal secretary Alexander Poskrebyshev.

== Centralization of Military CI within Soviet Secret Services ==
The centralization of all Soviet counterintelligence institutions under one name and one command can be attributed to couple of things. One of the most important was that after the 22 June 1941, the German invasion of the USSR, the huge losses inflicted on the Red Army by the German Armed Forces, and Military counterintelligence Navy, Army branches lost control over their armed forces.

Tragic situations on the Eastern Front included the loss of the city of Smolensk, three hundred thousand Red Army soldiers taken as POWs, and more important the loss of the city of Kyiv, which opened up the main road to Moscow and later Operation Typhoon. Soviet leadership (headed by Joseph Stalin) convinced the retreating Red Army to stop at any cost. This job was left to secret service bosses NKVD chief Lavrenty Beria and NKGB People's Commissar for state security Vsevolod Merkulov.

=== Military CI under NKVD control ===
After the 22 June 1941 German invasion of the USSR, Stalin on 17 July, as Chairman of the State Defense Committee, signed special decree No.187 / ss, by which military counterintelligence was returned to the NKVD as a Directorate of Special Departments or UOO, with Viktor Abakumov as chief. UOO on every level was given much more power and a freer hand in decision-making than at any time since the creation of Cheka. Also on 19 July, by the order of NKVD No.00940, the UOO was moved from Moscow to the city of Kuibyshev. Navy 3rd Directorate was still under Navy control, until 11 January 1942 when it was incorporated into Directorate of Special Departments.

== Organization of UOO NKVD on the central level ==
The decision to create one Military counterintelligence organ subordinate to one command was made on July 17, 1941, by Chairman of the State Defense Committee Iosif Stalin, with the decree number GKO-187/ss.

The organization structure for the Directorate of Special Departments within NKVD was approved by the People's Commissariat on August 15, 1941, and declared by NKVD USSR order number No.001305, in 1941 between September 12 and 16.

Victor Abakumov, as head of UOO NKVD USSR, had a powerful position. Not only he was in charge of the whole Military counterintelligence apparatus (except the Navy branch, which was headed by Alexander Petrov as the 3rd NKVMF Directorate. He was acquired by the UOO in January 1941, but with experience from his time in the Commissar of Internal Affairs for Military counterintelligence.) Having that position, he was officially subordinate to the NKVD USSR head Lavrentiy Beria, but daily he was called to Stalin's office to answer direct questions about cases, especially when was there nothing new since Stalin liked to call the NKGB head Merkulov or the rest of Berias deputies.

His first deputy and deputies, some of the deputies were also in charge of certain departments and responsible for coordinating preferments on the central level as in the field.

First UOO NKVD organization structure was:
- chief – (3rd rank) commissar of state security Viktor Abakumov
  - first deputy (3rd rank) Commissar of state security – Solomon Milshtein 7/19/1941-9/24/1942
  - Afanasiy Klykov – major of state security 7/17/1941-8/22/1941
  - Fyodor Tutushkin – division commissar (from 9/10/1941 – senior major of state security – 8/22/1941-6/30/1942
  - Nikolai Osetrov – 8/22/1941- 4/29/1943
  - Lavrentiy Tsanava – 10/21/1941-4/19/1943, (3rd rank) Commissar of state security.
  - Abakumov helper colonel Ivan Moskalenko 8/1941–4/1943
First UOO NKVD Organization according to NKVD Order No 001305
- Secretariat headed by Yakov Broverman
- Operational Section headed by A Miusov
- 1st Department: responsible for counter-espionage and other security measures in Red Army General Staff, headed by (at the time) state security major – Ivan Moskalenko
- 2nd Department – responsible for Air Force headed by (at the time) brigade commissar Aleksandr Avsyevich
- 3rd Department (responsible for armored forces, artillery, chemical, and railway troops) headed by (at the time) state security captain Vlacheslav Rogov
- 4th Department – running agent networks, and conducting operational work in the main branches of the troops headed by brigade commissar: Gregory Bolotin
- 5th Department – CI protection of Red Army rear, headed by Konstanty Prohorenko.
- 6th Department – NKVD troops headed by Iosif Lokish
- 7th department – searches, registration of operational informants and agents. Counterintelligence work within newly mobilized units headed by state security major Aleksandr Solovyev
- 8th Department – (ciphers) headed by M. Sharikov
- Investigation Unit – at the time State Security Kapitan Boris Pavlovsky

== UOO at the field and OSO NKVD and political commissars' role in the prosecution of RKKA and civilian cases ==
Immediately after the German attack of June 22, 1941, martial law was declared in USSR. Military tribunals were charged with hearing not only cases of servicemen if they involved threats to the defense of the Soviet Union or state security. At this time, the USSR's penal code allowed the OO's officers to prosecute civilian cases under the criminal code paragraph 58-9 (diversions). In a couple of cases, it took civilians very little to be challenged and shot. In this case, factory workers were arrested by OO officers that were responsible for the protection of the military factory for dropping ranch by accident, and making a small fire. The man tried was arrested and charged with diversion (sabotage) and shot, while his wife was sentenced to 15 years in a Gulag.

Cases were prosecuted within 24 hours after the person was charged. Initially, tribunals were obligated to get Moscow's approval for every death sentence. On July 27, 1941, this requirement was abolished. By September 1941, commanders and political commissars of division were also given the right to confer the death sentence. Executions were carried out immediately.

When Stalin signed order #270, he also signed other orders to give more power to political commissars and OO officers in the field from the corps level down through military ranks. He also required all level commanders to report the names of all servicemen taken as POWs and their families.

== Table of UOO representatives in the Red Army fronts ==
OO Directorate heads as of July 1941

Front	Front Military Commander	Head of Front OO Directorate
Northern Front, then Leningrad Front (from August 1941: some troops were included in the Karelian and Volkhov fronts)	1.Lieutenant General Markian M. Popov Jun/Sep 1941 2.USSR Marshal Kliment Voroshilov Sep 1941; Army Gen. Georgy Zhukov Sep/Oct 1941. 4.Maj. Gen. Ivan Fedyuninsky Oct 1941; 5.Lt. Gen. Mikhail Khozin Oct 1941/Jun 1942; 6.Army Gen. Leonid Govorov Jun 1942/Jul 1945	1.Pavel Kuprin Jul/Aug 1942; 2. State Security Senior Major Dimitri Melnikov May/Jun 1942; 3.Aleksandr Bystrov June 1942 – June 1945
Northwestern Front (disbanded in November 1943; later became 1st Belorussian Front	1.Lt. Gen. Fyodor Kuznetsov Jun/Jul 1941; 2.Maj. Gen. Pyotr Sobennikov, Jul/Aug 1941; 3.Lt. Gen. Pavel Kurochkin Sep 1941/Oct 1942; 4.Marshal Semyon Timoshenko Oct 1942/Mar 1943	1.Isai Babich Jun/Jul 1941 2.Victor Bochkov Jul/Dec 1941; 3.Nikolai Korolev Jan/May 1942; 4.Isai Babich May 1942 – 1943
Western Front (in April 1944 divided into the 2nd Belorussian Front| and 3rd Belorussian Front	1.Army. Gen. Dmitry Pavlov June 1941; 2. Marshal Semyon Timoshenko Jul/Sep 1941; 3.Col. Gen. Ivan Konev Sep/Oct 1941; 4.Army Gen.Georgy Zhukov Oct 1941/Aug 1942; 5. Col. Gen. Ivan Konev Aug 1942/Feb 1943; 6. Army Gen. Vasily Sokolovsky Feb 1943/Apr 1944	1. Lavrentiy Tsanava July/Oct 1941; 2. Aleksandr Belanov Oct 1941/Jan 1942; 3. Lavrentiy Tsanava Jan 1942/Mar 1943.
Central Front disbanded in August 1941. Troops moved to Bryansk Front	1. Lt. Gen. Fyodor Kuznetsov; Jul/Aug 1941; 2. Lt. Gen. Mikhail Yefremov Aug 1941	Pavel Begman Jul/Aug 1941
Southwestern Front. Disbanded in October 1942 created again as 3rd Ukrainian Front	1. Lt. Gen. Mikhail Kirponos Jun/Jul 1941; 2.; Marshal of the Soviet Union Semyon Budennyi Jul/Sep 1941; 3. Marshal Semyon Timoshenko Sep/Dec 1941; 4.Lt. Gen. Fyodor Kostenko Dec 1941/Apr 1942; 5.Marshal of the Soviet Union Semyon Timoshenko Apr/Jul 1942.: 6. Col. Gen. Nikolay Vatutin Oct 1942/March 1943	1. Commissar of State Security 3rd Rank Anatoli Mikheev Jul/Sep 1941.; 2. Nikolai Selivanovsky Oct 1941/Aug 1943 3. A.F. Frolov Oct/Dec 1942 4. Pavel Zelin Dec 1942/Apr 1943
Southern Front disbanded in July 1942. Troops transferred to the Northern Caucasian Front	1.Army Gen I. Tyulelnev Jun/Aug 1941; 2. Lt. Gen. D. Ryabyshev, Aug/Oct 1941; 3. Col.Gen. Ya. Chernichenko Oct/Dec 1941; 4. Lt.Gen. Ya Malinovsky Dec/Jul 1942	1. N.S Sazkin Jul/Sep 1941; Pavel Zelin
Front of reserve Armies (on Oct 10, 1941, merged with the Western Front, later 2nd Ukrainian Front)	1. Army General G.Zhukov, Jul–Sep 1941; 2. Marshal S. Budennyi, Sep–Oct 1941	A. Belyanov, Jul–Oct 1941
Source: Vadim J. Birstein, SMERSH: Stalin's Secret Weapon

=== Back to three separate units and creating GURK SMERSH ===
Resolution No. 414-138 ss ordered the NKVD's Directorate of Special Departments to be split into three separate military counterintelligence units, within the NKO, Navy Commissariat and NKVD, respectively, as has been done in early 1941. The same order that created GUKR SMERSH within the NKO created a parallel organisation within the Navy Commissariat, the NKVMF. This organization was known as the Navy UKR SMERSH and was headed by Peter Gladkov and his two deputies Aleksei Lebedev and Sergei Dukhovich. In reality, Gladkov reported to Abakumov, then deputy Commissar of the NKO for Counterintelligence, and Stalin's deputy. Formally Gladkov was subordinate to his superior People's Commissar Nikolay Gerasimovich Kuznetsov, head of the Navy.
