= Death to Spies: Moment of Truth =

2008 video game

- Poster for Death to Spies: Moment of Truth
- Developer: Haggard Games
- Publisher: 1C Company
- Series: Death to Spies
- Platform: Windows
- Release: RU: 28 March 2008; NA: 7 August 2009; EU: 9 October 2009
- Genre: Stealth action
- Mode: Single-player

Death to Spies: Moment of Truth (Russian: Смерть шпионам: Момент истины) is a third-person stealth action set during World War II. It was released for Microsoft Windows in March 2008. Produced by 1C Company along with Russian studio Haggard Games, Moment of Truth is a sequel to the 2007 stealth action game Death to Spies.

== Overview ==
The game's main character is Semion Strogov, who is a captain in the 4th department of the Soviet counterintelligence service called SMERSH. SMERSH is an acronym of the Russian phrase Smert' Shpionam, meaning 'Death to Spies', which was the name for a set of counterintelligence departments in the Soviet Army formed during World War II. Semion Strogov is back from his previous missions and must now participate in a series of even more complicated and exciting covert operations under the code name "Death to Spies: Moment of Truth". The hero possesses all the skills required to accomplish dangerous missions including getting information about the disposition of hostile military and civil units, and assassination of enemy agents and representatives of the Wehrmacht's high-ranking officers and espionage. After having undergone some serious retraining, Semion Strogov will have to accomplish various top secret missions. His task is to capture spies, saboteurs and gather information about their actions using unique technologies and devices. The character's forté is being able to carry out the operations with maximum stealth, using various techniques which include, but are not limited to: picking locks, stunning or using chloroform on enemies, throwing knives, garroting, booby traps: setting traps on dead bodies, doors, etc.

== Features ==
- Reveals the activities of the mysterious SMERSH counterintelligence service of World War II, with missions based on actual historical facts and declassified data on the SMERSH.
- Stealth action with sneaking, knife throwing, silent elimination of enemies, distracting enemies, picking locks, setting mines and other booby traps, covert observation and surveying.
- Various World War II era vehicles, including cars and motorcycles.
Reception

Aggregate scores
Aggregator	Score
GameRankings	71.67%
Metacritic	73/100

Review scores
Publication	Score
GameSpot	7.0
GameZone	7.5

== Reception ==
The game received "mixed or average" reviews, according to review aggregator Metacritic.

== Sequel ==
The third installment in the series was announced in 2010 by 1C Company under the title Death to Spies 3: Ghost of Moscow, which was being developed by Haggard Games. In 2011, 1C Company withdrew from the publishing contract, but Haggard Games continued developing the title. A crowdfunding campaign was launched on Indiegogo in 2013 and another on Kickstarter in 2014, both of which failed. In June 2015, Maximum Games was announced as the new publisher and developer making it their first in-house game, renaming it to Alekhine's Gun, which is a reference to the chess formation of the same name. It saw the light of the day on multiple platforms (Microsoft Windows, PlayStation 4 and Xbox One) on 1 March 2016.
