= Dmitri Pavlov =

Dmitri Pavlov may refer to:

- Dmitry Pavlov (general) (1897–1941), Soviet general
- Dmitri Pavlov (composer) (born 1959), Russian composer
