= SMERSH =

Soviet counterintelligence agencies (1943–46)

Main Directorate of Counter-Intelligence "SMERSH"
- Главное управление контрразведки «СМЕРШ» Glavnoye upravleniye kontrrazvedki "SMERSH"
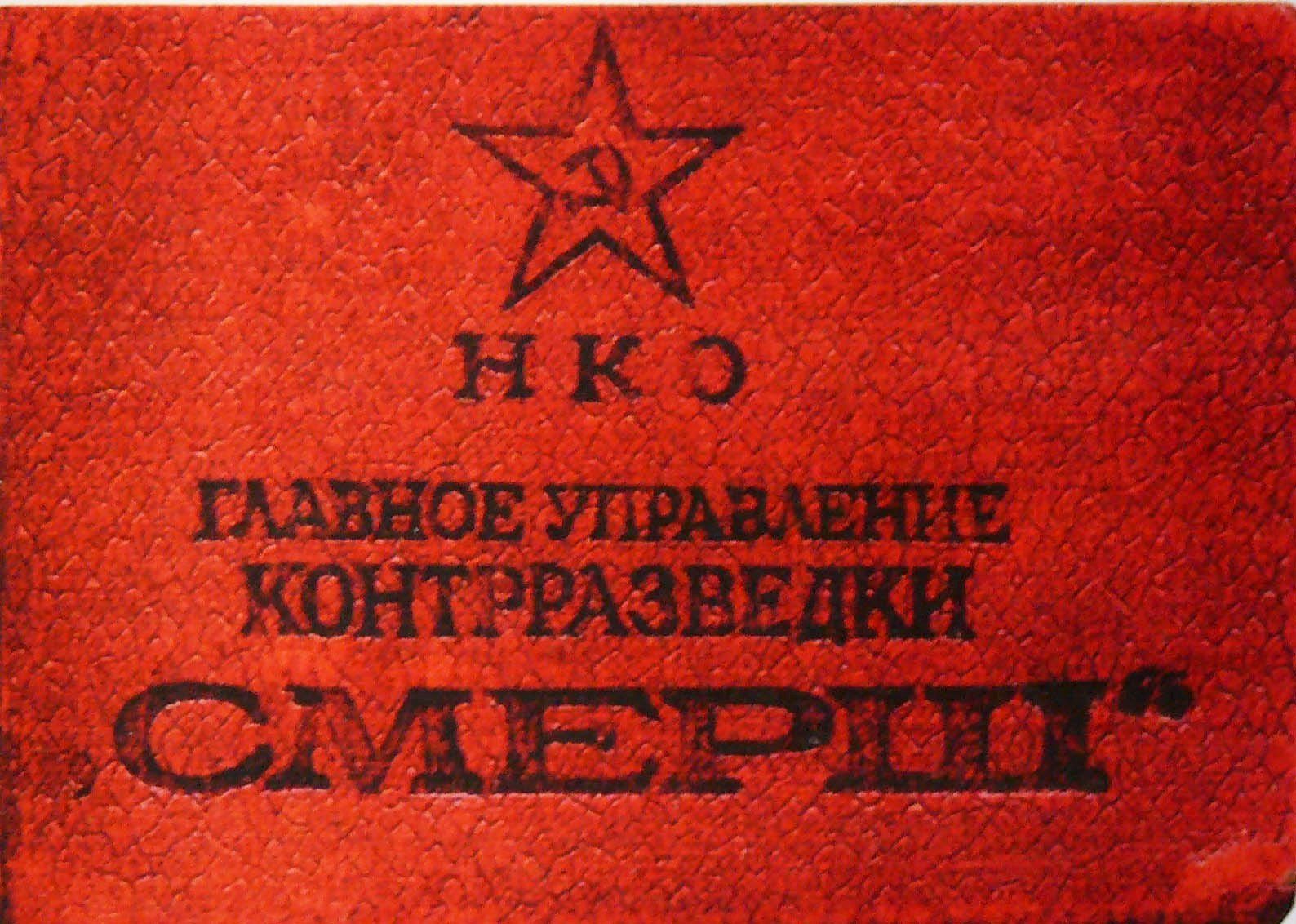

Agency overview
- Formed: 14 April 1943
- Preceding agencies: Directorate of Special Departments within NKVD USSR; III Main Directorate within MGB USSR
- Dissolved: 4 May 1946
- Type: Military counter-intelligence
- Jurisdiction: Soviet Union newly liberated and newly occupied territories (World War II)
- Headquarters: Lubyanka (4th and 6th floors) Moscow, Soviet Union
- Motto: Смерть шпионам! (Death to spies!)
- Agency executive: Viktor Abakumov
- Parent department: State Defense Committee
- Parent agency: State Defense Committee

SMERSH (Russian: СМЕРШ) was an umbrella organization for three independent counter-intelligence agencies in the Red Army formed in late 1942 or even earlier, but officially announced only on 14 April 1943. The name SMERSH was coined by Joseph Stalin. The formal justification for its creation was to subvert the attempts by Nazi German forces to infiltrate the Red Army on the Eastern Front.

The official statute of SMERSH listed the following tasks to be performed by the organisation: counter-intelligence, counter-terrorism, preventing any other activity of foreign intelligence in the Red Army; fighting "anti-Soviet elements" in the Red Army; protection of the front lines against penetration by spies and "anti-Soviet elements"; investigating traitors, deserters, and self-inflicted wounds in the Red Army; and checking military and civil personnel returning from captivity.

The organisation was officially in existence until 4 May 1946, when its duties were transferred back to the Ministry of State Security (MGB). The head of the agency throughout its existence was Viktor Abakumov, who rose to become Minister of State Security in the postwar years.

== Name ==
Joseph Stalin coined the name СМЕРШ (SMERSH) as a portmanteau of the Russian-language phrase Смерть шпионам (Smertʹ shpionam, lit. 'Death to spies'). Originally focused on combating German spies infiltrating the Soviet military, the organization quickly expanded its mandate: to find and eliminate any subversive elements—hence Stalin's inclusive name for it.

== History ==
Until 3 February 1941, the 4th Department (Special Section, OO) of the Main Directorate of State Security (GUGB)—the most important security body within the People's Commissariat of Internal Affairs (NKVD)—was responsible for the Soviet Armed Forces' military counter-intelligence. On that date, the Special Section's 12 Sections and one Investigation Unit were separated from GUGB NKVD. The official liquidation of OO GUGB within NKVD was announced on 12 February by a joint order № 00151/003 of NKVD and NKGB USSR. The rest of GUGB was abolished and staff was moved to newly created People's Commissariat for State Security (NKGB). Departments of former GUGB were renamed Directorates. For example, former Foreign Department (INO) became Foreign Directorate (INU); political police represented by Secret Political Department (SPO) became Secret Political Directorate (SPU), and so on. The former GUGB 4th Department (OO) was split into three sections. One section, which handled military counter-intelligence in NKVD troops (former 11th Section of GUGB 4th Department OO) became 3rd NKVD Department or OKR (Otdel KontrRazvedki), the chief of OKR NKVD was Aleksander Belyanov, Commissar State Security 3rd rank. On 25 February 1941, Viktor Abakumov became NKVD deputy Commissar in charge of supervising this and several other departments.

The second and most significant part went to the Defense Commissariat Soviet Armed Forces (the NKO) becoming its 3rd Directorate or (3 Upravlenie). The 3rd NKO Directorate took over most of the 4th GUGB Department Sections and was headed by division commissar Anatolii Mikheev, the former and last OO GUGB NKVD chief. The third part of former OO (the 10 Section) became the People's Commissariat of the Navy 3rd Directorate. The head of navy KI was Andrei Petrov, a state security captain.

=== Operation Barbarossa ===
After the 22 June 1941 German invasion of the USSR, Stalin on 17 July, as Chairman of State Defense Committee, signed special decree №187 / ss, by which military counterintelligence was returned to the NKVD as a Directorate of Special Departments or UOO, with Viktor Abakumov as chief. UOO on every level was given much more power and a freer hand in decision making than at any time since the creation of Cheka. Also on 19 July, by the order of NKVD №00940, the UOO was moved from Moscow to the city of Kuibyshev. Navy 3rd Directorate was still under Navy control, till 11 January 1942 when it was incorporated into Directorate of Special Departments.

On 2 July 1941, NKGB USSR was incorporated back into the NKVD structure. NKGB did not return as GUGB, but as separate units. The NKVD structure organisation from 31 July 1941 shows that there are independent Directorates as in the 1st: foreign intelligence, 2nd: domestic KI, and so on. There is no GUGB within NKVD after its official liquidation in the beginning of February 1941.

After the situation on the Russian fronts (known as Eastern front) became more stable, on 14 April 1943, the State Defense Committee (GKO), chaired by Stalin, ordered another split of the People's Commissariat for Internal Affairs (NKVD USSR) into three organisations: By decision of the Politburo of the CPSU [then VKP(b)] nr. P 40/91People's Commissariat for State Security or (NKGB) was created for the second time. It was based on NKVD's Directorates. The most important of them were: 1st INU (foreign intelligence), 2nd KRU (domestic counterespionage, fighting anti-Soviet organizations, protection of state economy, house searches, and arrests) NKVD 2nd Department (government and party officials protection) was transferred as NKGB 6th Directorate, NKVD Transportation Directorate was absorbed as NKGB 3rd Directorate and NKVD 4th Directorate was moved to NKGB with the same number. For detailed organization see NKGB. "Regulations of the People's Commissariat of State Security" were approved by SNK in order № 621-191ss from 2 June 1943. After losing most of the operational units to the NKGB, the People's Commissariat for Internal Affairs (NKVD) was still a very powerful government apparatus. It was responsible for public order in USSR by using heavily armed police in each corner of the country, running the largest penal labour camps under the Gulag Directorate, POWs camps and NKVD troops with loyal and well-equipped soldiers, that by the end of the war the numbers of NKVD troops were 1½ million strong with their own air force, armored and cavalry units.

Resolution No. 414-138 ss ordered the NKVD's Directorate of Special Departments to be split into three separate military counterintelligence units, within the NKO, Navy Commissariat and NKVD, respectively, as has been done in early 1941. The same order that created GUKR SMERSH within the NKO created a parallel organisation within the Navy Commissariat, the NKVMF. This organization was known as the Navy UKR SMERSH and headed by Peter Gladkov and his two deputies Aleksei Lebedev and Sergei Dukhovich. In reality, Gladkov reported to Abakumov, by then deputy Commissar of the NKO, and Stalin's deputy. Formally Gladkov was subordinate to his superior People's Commissar Nikolay Gerasimovich Kuznetsov, head of Navy.

OKR SMERSH (Counterintelligence Department) of the NKVD USSR was subordinate to Lavrentiy Beria, People's Commissar of Internal Affairs. The NKVD OKR SMERSH was headed by Semion Yukhimovich and later V. Smirnov.

=== Duties ===
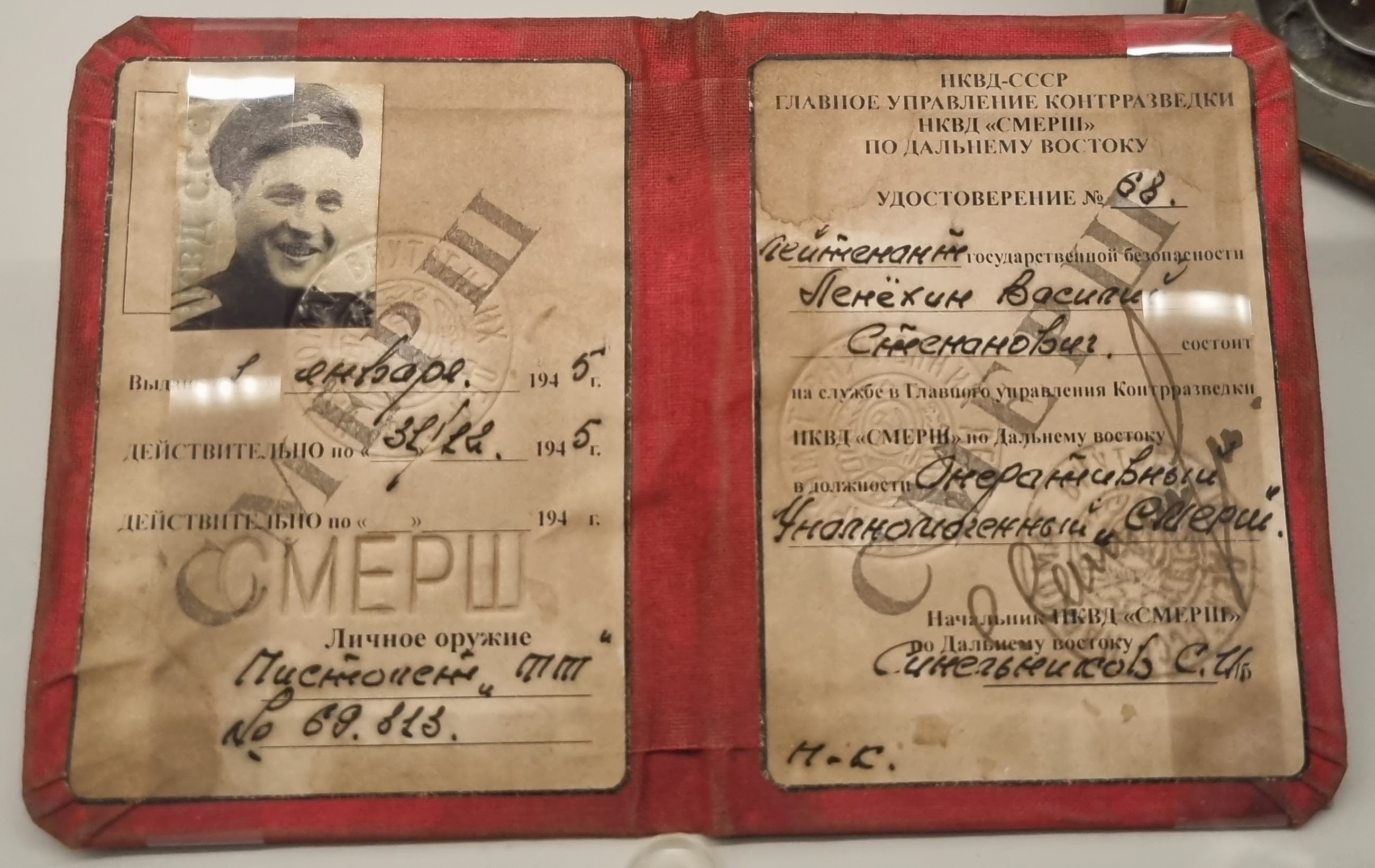
SMERSH identity document

The GKO officially created SMERSH to ensure the Soviet Union's security from internal political threats and foreign espionage, although it carried out a wide variety of other tasks between 1943 and 1946 as well. SMERSH's counterintelligence operations included seeking and destroying counter revolutionaries, finding and interrogating enemy agents, hunting Soviet agents who had not returned by the appointed date, and evaluating the usefulness of captured enemy documents. SMERSH also took an active role in the affairs of the Red Army by ensuring the good quality of Red Army facilities, improving discipline, eliminating poor leaders, and preventing desertion, self-inflicted wounds, panic, sabotage and poor discipline. Other SMERSH activities included: exposing collaborators in areas recently captured by the Red Army; exposing and punishing economic crimes such as black market activity; protecting secret material and headquarters from enemy agents and saboteurs; and determining the "patriotism" of those captured, encircled, and those who had returned from foreign countries. SMERSH operatives also controlled partisan operations behind German lines and evaluated the partisans' loyalty to the Soviet Union. SMERSH would then arrest and neutralise anti-Soviet partisans, saboteurs, spies, conspirators, mutineers, deserters, and people designated as traitors and criminal elements at the combat front.

The strategic directorate focused on counter-espionage wet operations and counter-insurgency pacification operations that answered directly to Stalin. In March 1946, SMERSH Chief Directorate was resubordinated to the People's Commissariat of Military Forces (Наркомат Вооруженных Сил, NKVS). The NKVS was later reorganized into the Ministry of Military Forces (МVS) soon thereafter, and SMERSH was officially discontinued 4 May 1946.

=== Other activities ===
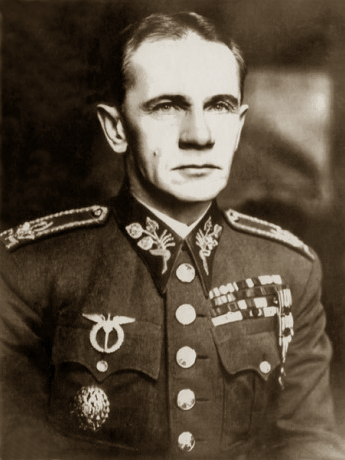
Former Czechoslovak army general and White émigré Sergey Voytsekhovsky was kidnapped from Czechoslovakia by SMERSH in May 1945, and died in a Soviet Gulag in 1951.

SMERSH activities included "filtering" the soldiers and forced labourers recovered from captivity. SMERSH was actively involved in the capture of Soviet citizens who had been active in anti-communist armed groups fighting on the side of Nazi Germany such as the Russian Liberation Army, the Cossack collaborationist formations (the XV SS Cossack Cavalry Corps and the Kazachi Stan militia), and the Organization of Ukrainian Nationalists.

As the war concluded, SMERSH was given the assignment of finding Adolf Hitler and, if possible, capturing him alive or recovering his body. Red Army officers and SMERSH agents reportedly found Hitler's partially burned corpse near the Führerbunker after his suicide and conducted an investigation to confirm his death and identify the remains that were secretly buried at SMERSH headquarters in Magdeburg until April 1970, when they were exhumed, completely cremated, and dumped.

SMERSH fought the Armia Krajowa and post-war organisations participating e.g. in the Augustów roundup.

== GUKR SMERSH HQ organization ==
A separate attachment to GKO decision No. 3222-ss/ov detailed the organisation of SMERSH and its branches in the Army:

The Smersh organs are a centralized organization. At the fronts and military districts the Smersh organs (the NKO Smersh directorates at fronts and NKO Smersh departments at the armies, corps, divisions, brigades, military districts, and other units and organizations of the Red Army) are subordinated to the higher organs. (...) The Smersh organs inform Military Councils and commanders of the corresponding units, troops, and organizations of the Red Army on the matters of their work: on the results of their combat with enemy agents, on the penetration of the army units by anti-Soviet elements, and on the results of combat against traitors of the Motherland, deserters, and self mutilators.

The structure of GUKR SMERSH within Defence Commissariat – April 1943 to May 1946
- Defense Commissariat – headed by (at the time of taking post) Defence Commissar Marshal of the Soviet Union – Joseph Stalin
- Main Counterintelligence Directorate headed by (at the time of taking post) Commissar of State Security 2nd rank Viktor Abakumov.
  - first deputy: (at the time of taking post) Commissar of State Security 2nd rank – Nikolai Selivanovsky
  - deputy: (at the time of taking post) Commissar of State Security 3nd rank – Pavel Meshik
  - deputy: (at the time of taking post) State Security Commissar – Isai Babich
  - deputy for staff affairs: (at the time of taking post) State Security Colonel – Ivan Vradii
- Secretariat – Secretarial work within GUKR SMERSH headed by (at the time of taking post) State Security Colonel Ivan Chernov
- 1st Department – Counterintelligence within the Red Army command. Officers assigned to all military units, from the battalion level upward. Also control of political officers within Red Army – headed by State Security Colonel Ivan Gorgonov 29 April 1943 – 27 May 1946
- 2nd Department – CI Operations within foreign POWs, and also filtering of Soviet armed forces officers and servicemen who had been POWs. Those investigations were result of Order No. 270 and Order No. 227. Also collection of intelligence information from areas immediately behind enemy lines headed by (at the time of taking post) State Security Colonel Sergei Kartashov 29 April 1943 – May 1946
- 3rd Department – was in charge both of identifying German agents working behind the Red Army front, and of radio games. In the field, officers or branches of the 3rd Dep. were assigned to all military units from the corps and higher. Also cooperation with 2nd dep's of UKRs of fronts and the 4th Sections of OKRs of the armies, (at the time of taking post) State Security Colonel Georgii Utekhin Apr/Sep 1943
- 4th Department – Counterintelligence behind enemy lines. Taking measures like finding the channels of penetration of enemy agents into the units and institutions of the Red Army. Sending qualified counterintelligence operatives and turned German agents (double agents) to the occupied German territory to penetrate their intelligence organizations, and German administration. 4th GUKR Dep frequently cooperated with NKGB Directorates like 1st (foreign intelligence, headed by Pavel Fitin), 2nd (domestic counterintelligence ) run by Pyotr Fedotov and especially with 4th Directorate run by famous penetrator of Manhattan Project, Pavel Sudoplatov. Headed by (at the time of taking post) State Security Colonel Pyotr Timofeev Apr/Sep 1943
- 5th Department – was in charge of supervising UKRs of fronts. It also maintained military field courts, headed by (at the time of taking post) State Security Colonel Dimitrii Zenichev, and from July 1944 by State Security Colonel Andrei Frolov
- 6th Department – (also known as Investigation Unit) This unit was not present in a UKRs and OKRs structures. Unit existed only in the GUKR SMERSH headquarters in Moscow. Investigators of 6th Dep worked very closely with 2nd GUKR Dep officers. In charge of (6th Dep) was (at the time of taking post) State Security Lieutenant Colonel Aleksandr Leonov. (Leonov and at the time his deputy Mikhail Likhachev, played important roles in interrogations of German POWs of highest level.) Likhachev headed SMERSH group at the Nuremberg Trials. Also cases prepared by the 6th Department were tried by the Military Collegium or the OSO of the NKVD USSR.
- 7th Department – in charge of statistics and archival data. Also responsible for surveillance of high level military personnel in the Central Committee and the Defense and the Navy Commissariats, as well as those involved in secret work who were sent abroad. Dep 7th was head by (at the time of taking post) State Security Colonel Aleksandr Sidorov

At the end of the Second World War, American forces examining captured German intelligence sources determined that SMERSH was composed of six directorates, six departments, and three other branches. Directorates conducted operations involving agents on the "frontline" of the intelligence war whereas departments received and interpreted the information coming in from agents and enemy intercepts. SMERSH also ran three other groups: the Komendatura, which guarded and managed SMERSH installations and prisoners; the Troika, which acted as a military court and could administer punishment without defense from the accused; and the Administrative Bureau and Secretariat, which acted as the personal staff of the SMERSH commander.

Below is the organization of SMERSH based on German Intelligence. The second chart shows another way SMERSH may have been organized.

SMERSH (per German intelligence)

Stalin	People's Commissariat of Defense (NKO)
Secretariat	GUKR (SMERSH)	Administration Bureau
Staff Surveillance; Directorate	Dept. Tech / Signal Surveillance
Troop Surveillance; Directorate	Dept. Security
Directorate of Counter-intelligence	Dept. Information
Partisan Directorate	Dept. Censorship
Personnel Directorate	Code and Cipher Dept.
Investigations; Directorate	Dept. of Special Investigations
Troika	Kommendataura / Guard Unit
Administrative Bureau and Secretariat

SMERSH (second variant)

People's; Commissariat of Defence
Chief and Deputies
Secretariat
Section 1 Protection of Red Army central institutions	Section 5 Oversight of SMERSH in military districts
Section 2 Work among POWs	Section 6 Investigations
Section 3 Counterespionage and Radio games	Section 7 Information and statistic
Section 4 Organization of Counter-intelligence behind front lines	Section 8 Codes and communications

== UKR SMERSH units at the front ==
GUKR SMERSH directed the work of field directorates, assigned to the fronts. These field organs were referred to as UKR SMERSH (Upravlenie Kontrrazvedki) or Counterintelligence Directorates. The naming distinguished them from the GUKR (HQ) SMERSH headquarters. The difference between GUKR and UKR or OKR was in the status hierarchy in the Red Army Military CI (the same structures were applied in February 1941 to NKO, NKMF and NKVD military counterintelligence units). They were ranked according to their authority. In the case of SMERSH the system of organization was: Main (or Chief) Directorate or GUKR SMERSH, Directorate of Counterintelligence or UKR SMERSH, and Department of Counterintelligence or OKR SMERSH.

GUKR in Moscow consisted of 11 operational and 3 non-operational departments, a total of 646 men. For comparison, GUKR SMERSH's predecessor, UOO NKVD Directorate of Special Departments within the NKVD (Russian: УОО НКВД) consisted of 225 men in 1942. Not all departments corresponded to their UOO NKVD predecessors. With the new focus on the Germans and other enemies, two departments, the 3rd and 4th, transferred from the NKVD/NKGB.^{[p. 257]}

The 3rd Department had the task of capturing German spies in the rear and organizing radio games with their help, and the 4th Department headed counter-intelligence measures behind the front line. Five of the departments, the 1st, 2nd, 3rd, 4th and 6th. were involved directly in investigation.

The UKR SMERSH (Counterintelligence Directorate) of the front, directed the OKRs Counterintelligence Departments (Otdiel Kontrrazvedki) within the armies and units. There SMERSH officers were attached to each rifle corps. The OKR at the division level consisted of 21 men, including a head, his deputy, a ciphering officer, investigators, commandant, and a platoon of guards. The OKR of each army included 57 men, while the size of the front UKR depended on how many armies composed the front. If the front consisted of five armies, its UKR included 130 officers, if there were fewer armies, the UKR had 112 officers.

Military Districts had a different structure. For example, the Moscow Military District, the biggest one at the time, had between 109 and 193 officers; they went through special training for filtering POWs. SMERSH units at the fronts were supported by NKVD internal troops for guarding prisoners, for operational work UKR and OKR SMERSH units were supported by regular Red Army servicemen. SMERSH front directorates were provided with a battalion, SMERSH army departments with a company, and SMERSH departments at the regiment, division, or brigade level, a platoon.

Fronts Commanders and UKR commanding heads

Front or Military District	Front Commander	UKR Head
Karelian Front (disbanded Nov 1944)	Col Gen. Valerian A. Frolov	Aleksei Sidnev then Dmitrii Mel'nikov
Leningrad Front	Marshal Leonid Govorov	A Bystrov
Kalinin Front (1st Baltic Front from Oct 1943, Sambia Group from Mar 1945)	Army Gen. Andrei Yeremenko	N. Khanikov
Volkhov Front (in Feb 1944 divided between the Leningrad and 2nd Baltic Fronts)	Marshal Kirill Meretskov	D. Mel'nikov
Northwestern Front (disbanded Nov 1943, 2nd Belorussian Front from Feb 1944)	Col. Gen. Ivan Konev	Ya. Yedunov
Western Front (3rd Belorussian Front from April 1944)	Army Gen. Vasili Sokolovsky	P. Zelenin
Central Front (Soviet Union) (1st Belorussian Front from Oct 1943)	Marshal K. Rokossovsky	A. Vadis
Voronezh Front (1st Ukrainian Front from Oct 1943)	Army Gen. Nikolai Vatutin	N. Osetrov
Bryansk Front (2nd Baltic Front from Oct 1943)	Col. Gen. Max Reyter	N. Zheleznikov
Southern Front (4th Ukrainian Front from Oct 1943)	Army Gen. Fyodor Tolbukhin	N. Kovalchuk
Steppe Military District (2nd Ukrainian Front from Oct 1943)	Col. Gen. Markian Popov	N. Korolev
Northern Caucasian Front (Primorsk Army from Nov 1943)	Col. Gen. Ivan I. Maslennikov, Col. Gen. I. Petrol from May 1943	M. Belkin
Transcaucasian Front	Army Gen. Ivan Tyulenev	N. Rukhadze
Transbaikal Front	Col. Gen. Mikhail Kovalyov	I. Saloimsky
Far Eastern Front	Army Gen. Purkayev	A. Chesnokov
Moscow Military District	Col. Gen. Pavel Artemiev	F. Tutushkin
Source: Vadim J. Birstein, SMERSH: Stalin's Secret Weapon

== Methods ==
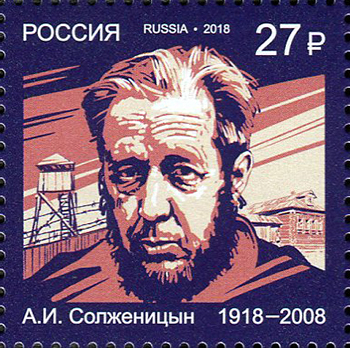
In February 1945, while serving as an officer in the Red Army, Aleksandr Solzhenitsyn was arrested by SMERSH for letters to a friend in which he criticized Stalin and the Soviet regime.

In its counter-espionage and counter-intelligence roles, SMERSH appears to have been extremely successful throughout World War II. SMERSH actions resulted in numerous captures, desertions, and defections of German intelligence officers and agents, some of whom SMERSH turned into double agents. Indeed, the Germans began to consider missions where their losses were less than ninety percent "satisfactory". According to German sources, the Soviets rendered approximately 39,500 German agents useless by the end of the war.

SMERSH utilized a number of different counterintelligence tactics: informants, security troops, radio games, and the passing of disinformation, ensuring both the reliability of the military and the civilian population. SMERSH set up a system of informants by sending a SMERSH officer to each battalion composed of between 1,000 and 1,500 men. Each SMERSH officer would enlist a number of "residents" who recruited their own "reserve resident" and between six and eight informants. Informants reported those sympathetic to the Germans, desertion, unpatriotic attitudes, and low morale and were authorized to take "immediate corrective action" if the need arose. SMERSH recruited between 1,540,000 and 3,400,000 informants, or about twelve percent of the entire Red Army. However, SMERSH coerced up to half of all of its informants to work for them.

In order to secure the Red Army's rear, SMERSH evacuated civilians and set up checkpoints so as to assert physical control. Next, agents sought and arrested "suspicious persons" who might be German agents. Finally, SMERSH interrogated those arrested.

Compared to its predecessor (Directorate of Special Departments – UOO), SMERSH was mostly focused on enemies spies, although Red Army servicemen were still under suspicion. Abakumov kept Stalin updated on all high-ranking commanders, and on the behavior of a number of leading military officers.

THE SYSTEM OF ARRESTS, GKO decision No. 3222-ss/ov
1. The arrest of a private or junior officer should be approved by a prosecutor;
2. The arrest of a mid-level commander should be approved by the commander and prosecutor of military unit.
3. The arrest of a high-level commander should be approved by the Military Council of the [front] and a prosecutor.
4. The arrest of a commander of the highest level should be authorized by the People's Commissar of Defense [Stalin].

To confuse German intelligence with disinformation, SMERSH utilized radio playbacks and played over 183 radio games over the course of the war. Operation "Opyt'" serves as a good example of the effectiveness of these radio games. Between May and June 1943, SMERSH used three German agents to spread disinformation about the Kursk counteroffensive by suggesting the Red Army had begun to dig in rather than prepare for an attack, thus contributing to the success of the Red Army's surprise attack. Before Operation Bagration, the largest Allied operation of the Second World War, SMERSH caught and "doubled" a number of German agents who tricked the German military into underestimating the number of Soviet troops by 1.2 million men.

SMERSH played a major role in creating and controlling partisan operations behind German lines. After capturing German-held territory and reuniting with the Red Army, SMERSH interviewed partisans in order to determine the partisans' loyalty to the regime.

== In popular culture ==
=== In the West ===
SMERSH has been popularized due to the organization's prominence as one of the common antagonists in Ian Fleming's early James Bond novels; however, Fleming's portrayal has been generally criticized as quite inaccurate by historians. In later works, Fleming abandoned the use of SMERSH as his chosen antagonists, introducing the purely fictional villainous organization SPECTRE.

In all Bond films based on Fleming's works that featured SMERSH, the agency was either changed to SPECTRE or omitted altogether. However, SMERSH is mentioned in From Russia With Love. Also, an operation 'smiert shpionam' ('death to spies') forms part of the plot of The Living Daylights, but this was organized by a Russian general acting without approval of the Soviet government.

In 1968, L. Ron Hubbard, the founder of the Church of Scientology, began writing that all of the world's governments had been taken over by SMERSH and that the organization was controlling the world through psychiatry, which the Church opposes. Hubbard proposed to defeat the alleged SMERSH infiltration by smuggling Sea Organization members into Switzerland, taking over the World Federation of Mental Health in Geneva, and then discrediting psychiatry by using the front organization to promote eugenics and mass euthanization to the United Nations. Hubbard abandoned the plan after the Swiss Federal Office of Public Health took notice of the Sea Org's plan.

=== In Russia ===
Intelligence and counter-intelligence work was often a topic of considerable interest in Russia. With millions of veterans after the war, many of them later became writers and directors. The Committee for State Security had a special "KGB Award in the field of literature and art" honoring depictions of an intelligence work. In modern Russia, there is a successor — the "FSB Award". Spy books were printed in editions numbering in the millions in the Soviet Union, with a spy as a one of a sacred figures in mind. Even today, there are regular re-publications of Soviet novels and documentaries under the "Counterintelligence Library" collection. Spy movies also were released every year, with 1968 being a special one: in that year The Shield and the Sword, Dead Season and The Secret Agent's Blunder were released; all three later became classics.

Literature

- The Moment of Truth — a 1973 novel by Vladimir Bogomolov set in 1944, is an example of authentic spy literature, as Bogomolov was a GRU officer at that time who also had an approval and consultations from Ivan Ilyichev — the Head of GRU — and used real war-time documents (orders, reports, summaries, reports, orientations, government telegrams and other official documents). In 2001, a Russian-Belarusian film adaptation was released.
- On Thin Ice — a 1960 novel by Georgy Bryantsev, a writer who during the war was a partisan and an intelligence officer who reached the rank of lieutenant colonel. It was the first book that provided an authoritative public description of the SMERSH counterintelligence group. In 1966, a film of the same name was released and became the highest-grossing movie that year, with 42.5 million tickets being sold.

Movies

- The Shield and the Sword — a four-part spy epic based on Vadim Kozhevnikov's novel and directed by Vladimir Basov. It was one of the first movies that depicted a true-to-life intelligence work. The release was both critical and box-office success with 68 million viewers (top 8 in all of Soviet history). The main song became a classic and the movie itself became one of the best in Soviet cinematography.
- Dead Season — a film directed by Savva Kulish. It was the first Soviet spy film set during Cold War era. Vladimir Vajnshtok wrote the script based on the newest declassified documents at that time by the KGB. It also was the first movie that worked with actual recently retired spies: Rudolf Abel had an opening scene with an appeal to the audience; and Konon Molody worked as a consultant under a Panfilov pseudonym.
- The Secret Agent's Blunder — a film directed by Veniamin Dorman. It is the first part of a tetralogy about Mikhail Tulyev. Set in the 60s, it depicts a theme of a Soviet nuclear arsenal. This film was described as "a psychological detective where emotions hits harder than action".

TV Series

- Seventeen Moments of Spring — a 1973 twelve-part television series, directed by Tatyana Lioznova and based on the novel of the same title by Yulian Semyonov. The series was a huge success among the Soviet viewers with an audience of 80 million. Stierlitz became an immediate folk hero, the musical theme became a cult classic, Tatyana Lioznova was awarded with Order of the October Revolution and Vyacheslav Tikhonov became a Hero of Socialist Labour for his role. Time magazine's reporter John Kohan defined Stierlitz as "the Soviet James Bond".
- TASS Is Authorized to Declare... — a 1984 ten-part series also based on Yulian Semyonov's novel. This time it is set during the Cold War era and depicts a clash between Soviet and American intelligence agencies.

Video games

- Death to Spies trilogy:
  - Death to Spies — released in 2007 by Haggard Games exclusively on PC. It is a stealth-action set in Second World War. Mechanically, it is close to a Hitman series, with an importance of disguise and camouflage.
  - Death to Spies: Moment of Truth — released in 2008 it is a stand-alone DLC that does not require the original Death to Spies.
  - Alekhine's Gun — released in 2016, it is the first game of the studio that was made for the eighth gen consoles. Troubles with funding and porting had a negative impact for the end product, which received mostly negative reviews.

== See also ==
- Military counterintelligence of the Soviet Army
- Gestapo–NKVD Conferences
- Death to Spies
