= Pavlov Ballet =

British ballet company

Pavlov Ballet was a Russian-based ballet company in Bristol. It was the first Russian ballet company incorporated outside of Russia. It was founded by Dmitri Pavlov in 1992 and incorporated in England and Wales in 1997. The company was led by twin sisters Ella Gusova (company director) and Alla Chachina (artistic director).

Pavlov Ballet made its UK debut in September 1998, concluding a triumphant first season in June 1999. The company’s repertoire featured classics such as Giselle, Grand Pas from Paquita, Les Sylphides, along with a selection of variations and pas de deux from a variety of ballets. The company quickly attracted media attention, with coverage from the BBC, HTV, Woman’s Own magazine, and Independent Sunday magazine. BBC Radio 4 reported on the pre-season launch, and BBC Europe Direct later featured the company in a dedicated segment.
