= Death to Spies =

2007 video game

- Developer: Haggard Games
- Publisher: 1C Company
- Designers: Alexey Agamalov, Sergey Gvozdev
- Series: Death to Spies
- Platform: Microsoft Windows
- Release: RU: 2 March 2007; NA: 18 September 2007; EU: 26 October 2007
- Genres: Stealth, third-person shooter
- Mode: Single-player

Death to Spies (Russian: Смерть шпионам) is a stealth third-person shooter video game set in World War II. Produced by 1C Company and Russian studio Haggard Games, it was released in 2007 for Windows and later via Valve's digital distribution system Steam on 12 March 2008. The game received mixed to positive reviews. Two sequels, Death to Spies: Moment of Truth and Alekhine's Gun, were released in 2009 and 2016, respectively.

== Gameplay ==
Death to Spies takes place from a third-person perspective. The player controls Semion Strogov, a captain in SMERSH, a Soviet counterintelligence agency. Strogov is able to run, jump, crouch, crawl, climb over obstacles, and drive vehicles. Taking place in World War II, the player is required to complete various tasks in enemy territory, such as killing targets and stealing documents. Emphasis is placed on stealth, as the player is greatly outnumbered by enemy personnel in every mission, and can fail an assignment if the alarm is raised.

The game's missions are connected by cutscenes, all of which take place in 1951. The plot begins with Strogov being arrested after the downfall of the head of SMERSH, Viktor Abakumov, and being interrogated about a series of missions he participated in from 1943 through 1946 in an effort to determine the extent of his ties to Abakumov.

The Heads-up display shows the level of awareness and suspicion of enemies, both of which are represented with a single bar at the top of the screen and are represented separately as different icons. A vector map can be displayed on the screen, showing characters' locations and their fields of vision, in which the player will be detected either instantly or gradually, depending on the distance. The vector map also shows the radius of noises made by the player; if someone is within the radius of the noise, they may investigate the noise or become alerted.

Disguises can be used to avoid alerting enemies when seen. When a character is knocked unconscious or killed without damaging the uniform, Strogov can change into their clothes. Some enemies are able to see through disguises and can be alerted if the player enters their vision, and all enemies can be alerted to suspicious behaviour which includes picking the lock of a door or looking through a door's keyhole, being in certain stances, or having certain weapons visible.

Before starting a mission, the player is usually able to select equipment to bring to the mission. Strogov can only carry one handgun, one long gun, and eighteen slots for small items such as ammunition and knives; one knife can also be stored in a dedicated slot. A backpack has space for larger items such as pliers and dynamite, and space for small items, but Strogov also has a weight limit to his inventory, and small items stored in a backpack must be moved to the eighteen slots before they can be used.

A variety of firearms (along with ammunition) and explosives are available to choose from, with the choices available depending on the mission. Other weapons include chloroform, knives, a garrote, and poison. German equipment can also be chosen to avoid suspicion from enemy personnel when in disguise and/or to make use of ammunition taken from enemies's bodies.

Several missions take place in Allied areas. The player is forced to begin these missions lightly armed and they cannot select their equipment. However, weapons and ammunition can be found in the level.

== Reception ==
Reception

Aggregate score
Aggregator	Score
Metacritic	69%

Review scores
Publication	Score
GameSpot	7/10
IGN	8/10

Death to Spies received "mixed or average reviews" according to review aggregator Metacritic. GameSpot gave it 7 out of 10, praising its detailed level design variation and challenging missions, but at the same time noting that the game can be overly difficult at times. IGN gave it an 8 out of 10, saying it was "horrifically difficult at times and not without its peculiarities; Death to Spies is nevertheless always interesting and wholly addictive."

== Sequels ==
On 23 March 2009, 1C Company announced a sequel, Death to Spies: Moment of Truth. It was released on 10 August 2009. A third installment was announced in 2010 under the title Death to Spies 3: Ghost of Moscow, but was later cancelled. After years of development issues and various crowdfunding campaigns, the game later resurfaced as Alekhine's Gun and was launched on 1 March 2016 for PlayStation 4, Xbox One, Microsoft Windows.
