= Fischer–Spassky (1992 match) =

Rematch of 1972 World Chess Championship

The 1992 Fischer–Spassky match was a chess match between former world chess champions Bobby Fischer and Boris Spassky. It was billed as a World Chess Championship, though it was an unofficial rematch of their 1972 World Championship match. Fischer won 10–5, with 15 draws. Although there was substantial media coverage, and some drama, public interest in this rematch was not nearly as great as with the 1972 World Championship match in Reykjavík, Iceland.

The match was played in late 1992 in the Federal Republic of Yugoslavia, which was under UN sports sanctions. Due to the breach of sanctions, the United States issued a warrant for Fischer's arrest, and he never returned to his home country.

== Background ==
After defeating Spassky to win the title of World Champion in the World Chess Championship 1972, Fischer was scheduled to defend his title in 1975 against the winner of the 1974 FIDE Candidates Tournament, Anatoly Karpov. Fischer, however, was unhappy with the format of the World Championship. At the time the format was a 24-game match, with the winner being the first player to score 12½ points; if the match were drawn 12–12, then the match would be stopped, the prize money would be split, and the Champion would retain his title. Fischer disliked this format because the player who was leading could play to draw games instead of win, and with each drawn game coast closer to the title. In his match against Spassky in 1972, games 14 to 20 were all draws. This style of chess offended Fischer. Instead, Fischer demanded the format be changed to that used in the very first World Championship, between Wilhelm Steinitz and Johannes Zukertort, where the winner was the first player to score 10 wins with draws not counting. In case of a 9–9 score, the champion would retain title, and the prize fund split equally. A FIDE Congress was held in 1974 during the Nice Olympiad. The delegates voted in favor of Fischer's 10-win proposal, but rejected the 9–9 clause as well as the possibility of an unlimited match. In response, Fischer refused to defend his title, and Karpov was declared World Champion by forfeit.

Seventeen years later, Fischer entered negotiations with sponsors willing to fund a match under his proposed format, settling on a bid from Yugoslav millionaire Jezdimir Vasiljević. Fischer insisted that since he had not been defeated in a match, he was still the true World Champion. He further claimed that all the games in the FIDE-sanctioned World Championship matches, involving Karpov and his challengers Korchnoi and Kasparov, had prearranged outcomes. He then played a rematch of the 1972 World Chess Championship against Spassky. The purse for the rematch was US$5 million, with $3.35M of the purse to go to the winner, and even the loser would get an excellent prize for which Spassky was grateful to Fischer. It was Fischer's fame that made this event possible.

== Match ==
The match started in Sveti Stefan near Budva, an island off the coast of Montenegro. The match rules required a player to win ten games (draws not counting), with no adjournments. After a player had won five games, the match would take a 10-day recess and continue in Belgrade, the capital of Serbia.

Fischer–Spassky 1992 Rematch
	Rank	1	2	3	4	5	6	7	8	9	10	11	12	13	14	15	16	17	18	19	20	21	22	23	24	25	26	27	28	29	30	Wins
Bobby Fischer (USA)	inactive	1	½	½	0	0	½	1	1	1	½	1	0	½	½	½	1	1	½	½	0	1	½	½	½	1	0	½	½	½	1	10
Boris Spassky (France)	96th	0	½	½	1	1	½	0	0	0	½	0	1	½	½	½	0	0	½	½	1	0	½	½	½	0	1	½	½	½	0	5

Spassky at the time was rated 2560, (tied for 96th–102nd on the FIDE rating list at the time), well below World Champion and world number one Garry Kasparov, who was rated 2790. Fischer's score of 17½ out of 30 (counting draws) against Spassky gave him a performance rating of 2660, which would have put him at No. 10 in the world on the January 1993 list.

Yasser Seirawan believed that the match proved that Fischer's playing strength was "somewhere in the top ten in the world". Kasparov himself was dismissive of Fischer, stating that "Bobby is playing OK, nothing more. Maybe his strength is 2600 or 2650. It wouldn't be close between us." Jeremy Silman wrote that Fischer's level of play was inconsistent: Games 1 and 11 were very highly regarded, but overall the level of play was below that of the world championship matches of Kasparov.

== Aftermath ==
After Fischer's victory, he proclaimed himself as the "Undefeated Champion of the World". His status as a World Champion in 1992 is not widely acknowledged.

Both match locations were at the time part of the same country, the Federal Republic of Yugoslavia, which was under UN sports sanctions because of the breakup of Yugoslavia. Fischer's participation led to a conflict with the US government, which warned Fischer that his participation in the match would violate an executive order imposing US sanctions on Yugoslavia. The US government ultimately issued a warrant for his arrest. After that, Fischer lived his life as an émigré.

Fischer never played competitively again after this match, and died in 2008.

For Spassky, this match proved to be his last major challenge. He continued to play occasional events, but never participated in a world championship cycle again.

== Games ==
=== Sveti Stefan venue ===
==== Game 1: Fischer–Spassky, 1–0 (Ruy Lopez Breyer) ====
Fischer–Spassky, game 1

Position: a8 black rook, d8 black queen, e8 black rook, g8 black king, b7 black bishop, d7 black knight, f7 black pawn, g7 black bishop, a6 black pawn, d6 black pawn, f6 black knight, g6 black pawn, h6 black pawn, b5 black pawn, d5 white pawn, e5 black pawn, a4 white pawn, b4 white pawn, c4 black pawn, e4 white pawn, c3 white pawn, f3 white knight, g3 white knight, h3 white pawn, c2 white bishop, d2 white bishop, f2 white pawn, g2 white pawn, a1 white rook, d1 white queen, e1 white rook, g1 white king

Fischer's novelty: 19.b2–b4!

Position: a8 black rook, c8 black rook, e8 black queen, b7 black bishop, e7 black bishop, f7 black pawn, g7 black king, h7 black knight, a6 black pawn, d6 black pawn, f6 black knight, g6 black pawn, b5 black pawn, d5 white pawn, e5 black pawn, h5 black pawn, a4 white pawn, b4 white pawn, c4 black pawn, e4 white pawn, a3 white rook, c3 white pawn, e3 white bishop, f3 white knight, h3 white pawn, a2 white rook, c2 white bishop, d2 white knight, f2 white pawn, g2 white pawn, a1 white queen, g1 white king

Position after 28...Kg7, featuring Alekhine's gun

September 2. 19.b4! was Fischer's novelty preventing ...Nc5. After 22.Ra3 Fischer had the upper hand.

Ruy Lopez: Breyer Variation (ECO C95)
1.e4 e5 2.Nf3 Nc6 3.Bb5 a6 4.Ba4 Nf6 5.0-0 Be7 6.Re1 b5 7.Bb3 0-0 8.c3 d6 9.h3 Nb8 10.d4 Nbd7 11.Nbd2 Bb7 12.Bc2 Re8 13.Nf1 Bf8 14.Ng3 g6 15.Bg5 h6 16.Bd2 Bg7 17.a4 c5 18.d5 c4 19.b4 (first diagram) Nh7 20.Be3 h5 21.Qd2 Rf8 22.Ra3 Ndf6 23.Rea1 Qd7 24.R1a2 Rfc8 25.Qc1 Bf8 26.Qa1 Qe8 27.Nf1 Be7 28.N1d2 Kg7 (second diagram) 29.Nb1 Nxe4 30.Bxe4 f5 31.Bc2 Bxd5 32.axb5 axb5 33.Ra7 Kf6 34.Nbd2 Rxa7 35.Rxa7 Ra8 36.g4 hxg4 37.hxg4 Rxa7 38.Qxa7 f4 39.Bxf4 exf4 40.Nh4 Bf7 41.Qd4+ Ke6 42.Nf5 Bf8 43.Qxf4 Kd7 44.Nd4 Qe1+ 45.Kg2 Bd5+ 46.Be4 Bxe4+ 47.Nxe4 Be7 48.Nxb5 Nf8 49.Nbxd6 Ne6 50.Qe5 1–0

==== Game 2: Spassky–Fischer, ½–½ (King's Indian Sämisch) ====
Spassky–Fischer, game 2

Position: d8 black rook, h8 black rook, a7 black pawn, c7 black knight, e7 black king, g7 black bishop, b6 black pawn, e6 black pawn, f6 black knight, h6 black pawn, c5 black pawn, e5 black pawn, f5 white pawn, c4 white pawn, e4 white knight, e3 white bishop, h3 white bishop, a2 white pawn, b2 white pawn, h2 white pawn, c1 white king, d1 white rook, f1 white rook

Position after 21...Nf6

September 3. If 15.f5? then 15...g5! After 17...f6! the game was even (Krnić).

King's Indian Defence: Sämisch Variation (ECO E80)
1.d4 Nf6 2.c4 g6 3.Nc3 Bg7 4.e4 d6 5.f3 c5 6.dxc5 dxc5 7.Qxd8+ Kxd8 8.Be3 Nfd7 9.Nge2 b6 10.0-0-0 Na6 11.g3 Nc7 12.f4 e6 13.Bh3 Ke7 14.Rhf1 h6 15.e5 Bb7 16.g4 Rad8 17.Ng3 f6 18.Nce4 fxe5 19.f5 Bxe4 20.Nxe4 gxf5 21.gxf5 Nf6 (diagram) 22.Rg1 Rxd1+ 23.Kxd1 Bf8 24.Nxf6 Kxf6 25.Rf1 exf5 26.Rxf5+ Kg7 27.Rxe5 Bd6 28.Re4 Bxh2 29.Ke2 h5 30.Re7+ Kf6 31.Rd7 Be5 32.b3 h4 33.Kf3 Rg8 34.Bg4 h3 35.Rh7 h2 36.Bf4 Rf8 37.Bxe5+ Kg6+ 38.Ke4 Kxh7 39.Bxh2 Re8+ 40.Kf5 Ne6 41.Kf6 Nd4 42.Bd6 Re4 43.Bd7 Re2 44.a4 Rb2 45.Bb8 a5 46.Ba7 Rxb3 47.Ke5 Nf3+ 48.Kd6 Nd2 49.Be6 Rb4 50.Kc6 Nb3 51.Bd5 Rxa4 52.Bxb6 Ra1 53.Bxc5 a4 54.Bb4 a3 55.c5 Nd4+ 56.Kd7 Rd1 57.Bxa3 Nc2 58.c6 Rxd5+ 59.Bd6 ½–½

==== Game 3: Fischer–Spassky, ½–½ (Ruy Lopez Breyer) ====
Fischer–Spassky, game 3

Position: c8 black bishop, c7 black rook, f7 black king, g7 black bishop, a6 black pawn, b5 black pawn, f5 black pawn, g5 black pawn, b4 white knight, b3 white pawn, d3 white knight, a2 white pawn, d2 white rook, f2 white pawn, g2 white pawn, g1 white king

Final position after 39...Rc7

September 5. After 23...Rc8 Spassky was slightly better.

Ruy Lopez: Breyer Variation (ECO C95)
1.e4 e5 2.Nf3 Nc6 3.Bb5 a6 4.Ba4 Nf6 5.0-0 Be7 6.Re1 b5 7.Bb3 0-0 8.c3 d6 9.h3 Nb8 10.d4 Nbd7 11.Nbd2 Bb7 12.Bc2 Re8 13.Nf1 Bf8 14.Ng3 g6 15.Bg5 h6 16.Bd2 exd4 17.cxd4 c5 18.Bf4 cxd4 19.Nxd4 Ne5 20.b3 d5 21.Qd2 dxe4 22.Nxe4 Nd5 23.Bg3 Rc8 24.Re2 f5 25.Bxe5 Rxe5 26.Ng3 Rxe2 27.Ngxe2 Nb4 28.Rd1 Nxc2 29.Nxc2 Qxd2 30.Rxd2 Rc7 31.Ne3 Kf7 32.h4 Bc8 33.Nf4 g5 34.hxg5 hxg5 35.Nd3 Bg7 36.Nd5 Rc6 37.N5b4 Rc7 38.Nd5 Rc6 39.N5b4 Rc7 ½–½

==== Game 4: Spassky–Fischer, 1–0 (QGA Classical) ====
Spassky–Fischer, game 4

Position: a8 black bishop, b8 black rook, b7 black knight, c7 black rook, d7 black knight, f7 black pawn, e6 black pawn, f6 black king, g5 white rook, h5 black pawn, a4 black pawn, b4 white pawn, c4 white knight, e4 white pawn, h4 white pawn, a3 white bishop, e3 white king, f3 white pawn, a2 white pawn, c2 white knight, e2 white bishop

Position after 32...Nb7

September 6. After 13.Nd4! Rc8 the game was even (Krnić).

Queen's Gambit Accepted: Classical Variation (ECO D27)
1.d4 d5 2.c4 dxc4 3.Nf3 Nf6 4.e3 e6 5.Bxc4 c5 6.0-0 a6 7.dxc5 Qxd1 8.Rxd1 Bxc5 9.b3 Nbd7 10.Bb2 b6 11.Nc3 Bb7 12.Rac1 Be7 13.Nd4 Rc8 14.f3 b5 15.Be2 Bc5 16.Kf1 Ke7 17.e4 g5 18.Nb1 g4 19.Ba3 b4 20.Rxc5 Nxc5 21.Bxb4 Rhd8 22.Na3 gxf3 23.gxf3 Nfd7 24.Nc4 Ba8 25.Kf2 Rg8 26.h4 Rc7 27.Nc2 Rb8 28.Ba3 h5 29.Rg1 Kf6 30.Ke3 a5 31.Rg5 a4 32.b4 Nb7 (diagram) 33.b5 Nbc5 34.Nd4 e5 35.Nxe5 Nxe5 36.Rf5+ Kg7 37.Rxe5 Nxe4 38.Bd3 Rc3 39.Bb4 Rxd3+ 40.Kxd3 Nf6 41.Bd6 Rc8 42.Rg5+ Kh7 43.Be5 Ne8 44.Rxh5+ Kg6 45.Rg5+ Kh7 46.Bf4 f6 47.Rf5 Kg6 48.b6 Rd8 49.Ra5 Bxf3 50.h5+ 1–0

==== Game 5: Fischer–Spassky, 0–1 (Ruy Lopez Breyer) ====
Fischer–Spassky, game 5

Position: a8 black rook, e8 black rook, g8 black king, b7 black bishop, d7 black knight, g7 black queen, a6 black pawn, b6 black knight, d6 black pawn, h6 black pawn, c5 black pawn, d5 white pawn, g5 black pawn, e4 black pawn, f4 white knight, h4 white knight, a3 black pawn, b3 white pawn, h3 white pawn, c2 white bishop, f2 white pawn, g2 white pawn, b1 white rook, d1 white queen, e1 white rook, g1 white king

Position after 28...g5

September 9. After 22...b4 the position was unclear (Chandler).

Ruy Lopez: Breyer Variation (ECO C95)
1.e4 e5 2.Nf3 Nc6 3.Bb5 a6 4.Ba4 Nf6 5.0-0 Be7 6.Re1 b5 7.Bb3 d6 8.c3 0-0 9.h3 Nb8 10.d4 Nbd7 11.Nbd2 Bb7 12.Bc2 Re8 13.Nf1 Bf8 14.Ng3 g6 15.Bg5 h6 16.Bd2 exd4 17.cxd4 c5 18.d5 Nb6 19.Ba5 Nfd7 20.b3 Bg7 21.Rc1 Qf6 22.Rb1 b4 23.Ne2 Qe7 24.a3 bxa3 25.Bc3 f5 26.Bxg7 Qxg7 27.Nf4 fxe4 28.Nh4 g5 (diagram) 29.Ne6 Qf6 30.Qg4 Nxd5 31.Nxg5 hxg5 32.Qxd7 Nb4 33.Qxb7 Nxc2 34.Rxe4 a2 35.Rf1 Nb4 36.Rg4 a1=Q 37.Rxa1 Qxa1+ 38.Kh2 Qg7 39.Qf3 Qe5+ 40.g3 Rf8 41.Qg2 Qf6 42.f4 Ra7 43.Rxg5+ Rg7 44.Rh5 Qe6 45.g4 Rxf4 0–1

==== Game 6: Spassky–Fischer, ½–½ (QGA Classical) ====
Spassky–Fischer, game 6

Position: a8 black rook, b8 black rook, d7 black knight, e7 black king, f7 black pawn, g7 black pawn, h7 black pawn, a6 black pawn, e6 black pawn, f6 black knight, c5 black bishop, d5 black bishop, e5 white knight, a4 white rook, b3 white pawn, e3 white pawn, b2 white bishop, d2 white knight, e2 white bishop, f2 white pawn, g2 white pawn, h2 white pawn, c1 white rook, g1 white king

Position after 16.Ne5

September 10. A better line for Fischer would have been 16...Bb4!? 17.Ndf3! a5! 18.Nc6+ Bxc6 19.Rxc6 Rc8 20.Nd4 with a slight plus for Spassky (Seirawan).

Queen's Gambit Accepted: Classical Variation (ECO D27)
1.d4 d5 2.c4 dxc4 3.Nf3 Nf6 4.e3 e6 5.Bxc4 c5 6.0-0 a6 7.dxc5 Qxd1 8.Rxd1 Bxc5 9.b3 Nbd7 10.Bb2 b5 11.Be2 Bb7 12.Nbd2 Ke7 13.a4 bxa4 14.Rxa4 Rhb8 15.Rc1 Bd5 16.Ne5 (diagram) Bd6 17.Nxd7 Nxd7 18.Rxa6 Rxa6 19.Bxa6 f6 20.Bc4 Bxc4 21.Rxc4 Nc5 22.Rc3 f5 23.Ba3 Ne4 24.Rc7+ Kd8 25.Bxd6 Nxd2 26.Rxg7 Rxb3 27.h4 h5 28.Bf4 Ke8 29.Kh2 Rb2 30.Kh3 Ne4 31.f3 Nf2+ 32.Kg3 Nd3 33.Bg5 e5 34.Kh3 Nf2+ 35.Kh2 Nd3 36.Bh6 Ne1 37.Kg1 Nd3 38.Bg5 Rb1+ 39.Kh2 Rb2 40.Re7+ Kf8 41.Re6 Kg7 42.Kh3 Re2 43.Rd6 Ne1 44.Bf6+ Kg8 45.Bxe5 Rxe3 46.Bf4 Re2 47.Rg6+ Kf7 48.Rg5 Ke6 49.Bc7 Ra2 50.Bb6 Nd3 51.Kh2 Ne1 52.Kh3 Nd3 53.Bc7 Rc2 54.Bb6 Ra2 55.Kg3 Ne1 56.Rxh5 Rxg2+ 57.Kf4 Nd3+ 58.Ke3 Ne5 59.Rh6+ Kd5 60.Bc7 Rg7 61.Bxe5 Kxe5 ½–½

==== Game 7: Fischer–Spassky, 1–0 (Ruy Lopez Zaitsev) ====
Fischer–Spassky, game 7

Position: a8 black rook, e8 black rook, f8 black bishop, g8 black king, b7 black bishop, f7 black pawn, a6 black pawn, f6 black knight, g6 black pawn, h6 black pawn, a5 black knight, b5 black pawn, d5 black queen, e5 black pawn, b4 white pawn, e4 white bishop, c3 white pawn, f3 white knight, g3 white knight, h3 white pawn, a2 white pawn, d2 white bishop, f2 white pawn, g2 white pawn, a1 white rook, d1 white queen, e1 white rook, g1 white king

Position after 20.Be4!

September 12. The players reached a Ruy Lopez Pilnik Variation (ECO C90) after 11...Re8, which transposed to the Zaitsev Variation after 13...Bb7. After 17...c4! 18.b4! cxd3 19.Bxd3 Qxd5 20.Be4! Nxe4 (only move) 21.Nxe4 Bg7 22.bxa5 f5 23.Ng3 e4 24.Nh4 Bf6? 25.Nxg6 e3 26.Nf4 Qxd2 27.Rxe3 Qxd1+ 28.Rxd1 Fischer had a decisive advantage (Matanović). If instead 20...Qc4, 21.Qb1! (Fischer) Nc6 22.Bxg6 fxg6 23.Qxg6+ Bg7 24.Nf5 and White wins.

Ruy Lopez: Zaitsev Variation (ECO C92)
1.e4 e5 2.Nf3 Nc6 3.Bb5 a6 4.Ba4 Nf6 5.0-0 Be7 6.Re1 b5 7.Bb3 d6 8.c3 0-0 9.d3 Na5 10.Bc2 c5 11.Nbd2 Re8 12.h3 Bf8 13.Nf1 Bb7 14.Ng3 g6 15.Bg5 h6 16.Bd2 d5 17.exd5 c4 18.b4 cxd3 19.Bxd3 Qxd5 20.Be4 (diagram) Nxe4 21.Nxe4 Bg7 22.bxa5 f5 23.Ng3 e4 24.Nh4 Bf6 25.Nxg6 e3 26.Nf4 Qxd2 27.Rxe3 Qxd1+ 28.Rxd1 Rxe3 29.fxe3 Rd8 30.Rxd8+ Bxd8 31.Nxf5 Bxa5 32.Nd5 Kf8 33.e4 Bxd5 34.exd5 h5 35.Kf2 Bxc3 36.Ke3 Kf7 37.Kd3 Bb2 38.g4 hxg4 39.hxg4 Kf6 40.d6 Ke6 41.g5 a5 42.g6 Bf6 43.g7 Kf7 44.d7 1–0

==== Game 8: Spassky–Fischer, 0–1 (KID Sämisch Panno) ====
Spassky–Fischer, game 8

Position: e8 black king, h8 black rook, c7 black rook, e7 black queen, f7 black pawn, a6 black pawn, d6 black pawn, g6 black pawn, b5 black pawn, c5 black knight, d5 white pawn, e5 black pawn, g5 white pawn, h5 black pawn, d4 black knight, e4 white pawn, h4 white pawn, e3 white knight, f3 white pawn, h3 white bishop, a2 white pawn, b2 white pawn, d2 white queen, f2 white rook, b1 white king, c1 white rook

Position after 31.Rc1

September 13. After 15...Be6! 16.Kb1! Ne8 Spassky had a slight advantage (Krnić).

King's Indian Defence: Sämisch Variation, Panno Variation (ECO E84)
1.d4 Nf6 2.c4 g6 3.Nc3 Bg7 4.e4 d6 5.f3 0-0 6.Be3 Nc6 7.Nge2 a6 8.Qd2 Rb8 9.h4 h5 10.Bh6 e5 11.Bxg7 Kxg7 12.d5 Ne7 13.Ng3 c6 14.dxc6 Nxc6 15.0-0-0 Be6 16.Kb1 Ne8 17.Nd5 b5 18.Ne3 Rh8 19.Rc1 Qb6 20.Bd3 Nd4 21.Nd5 Qa7 22.Nf1 Nf6 23.Nfe3 Bxd5 24.cxd5 Rbc8 25.Rcf1 Qe7 26.g4 Nd7 27.g5 Kf8 28.Rf2 Ke8 29.Bf1 Nc5 30.Bh3 Rc7 31.Rc1 (diagram) Ncb3 32.axb3 Nxb3 33.Rc6 Nxd2+ 34.Rxd2 Kf8 35.Rxa6 Ra7 36.Rc6 Kg7 37.Bf1 Ra1+ 38.Kxa1 Qa7+ 39.Kb1 Qxe3 40.Kc2 b4 0–1

==== Game 9: Fischer–Spassky, 1–0 (Ruy Lopez Exchange) ====
Fischer–Spassky, game 9

Position: d8 black bishop, g8 black knight, h8 black rook, b7 black king, c7 black pawn, g7 black pawn, h7 black pawn, a6 black pawn, b6 black pawn, e6 black bishop, f6 black pawn, a5 white pawn, c5 black pawn, e5 white pawn, e4 white knight, b3 white knight, e3 white bishop, f3 white pawn, b2 white pawn, c2 white pawn, g2 white pawn, h2 white pawn, a1 white rook, g1 white king

Position after 17.Ne4

September 16. After 17...Kc6?? 18.axb6 cxb6 19.Nbxc5! Fischer had a decisive advantage (Matanović).

Ruy Lopez: Exchange Variation (ECO C69)
1.e4 e5 2.Nf3 Nc6 3.Bb5 a6 4.Bxc6 dxc6 5.0-0 f6 6.d4 exd4 7.Nxd4 c5 8.Nb3 Qxd1 9.Rxd1 Bg4 10.f3 Be6 11.Nc3 Bd6 12.Be3 b6 13.a4 0-0-0 14.a5 Kb7 15.e5 Be7 16.Rxd8 Bxd8 17.Ne4 (diagram) Kc6 18.axb6 cxb6 19.Nbxc5 Bc8 20.Nxa6 fxe5 21.Nb4+ 1–0

==== Game 10: Spassky–Fischer, ½–½ (Nimzo-Indian Classical) ====
Spassky–Fischer, game 10

Position: h7 white rook, a6 white king, d5 black bishop, f5 black pawn, h5 black pawn, e4 black king, g4 black pawn, h4 white pawn, b3 black rook, e3 white bishop, g3 white pawn, f2 white pawn

Position after 48.Rh7

September 19. After 18.Bb5? (18.Qxa5 Nxa5 19.Rb5 Nc6 20.h4! was better) Qxd2+ 19.Kxd2 Bd7 Fischer had a slight advantage (Krnić).

Nimzo-Indian Defence: Classical Variation, Noa Variation (ECO E35)
1.d4 Nf6 2.c4 e6 3.Nc3 Bb4 4.Qc2 d5 5.cxd5 exd5 6.Bg5 h6 7.Bh4 c5 8.dxc5 Nc6 9.e3 g5 10.Bg3 Qa5 11.Nf3 Ne4 12.Nd2 Nxc3 13.bxc3 Bxc3 14.Rb1 Qxc5 15.Rb5 Qa3 16.Rb3 Bxd2+ 17.Qxd2 Qa5 18.Bb5 Qxd2+ 19.Kxd2 Bd7 20.Bxc6 Bxc6 21.h4 Ke7 22.Be5 f6 23.Bd4 g4 24.Rc1 Ke6 25.Rb4 h5 26.Rc3 Rhc8 27.a4 b6 28.Kc2 Be8 29.Kb2 Rxc3 30.Bxc3 Rc8 31.e4 Bc6 32.exd5+ Bxd5 33.g3 Bc4 34.Bd4 Kd5 35.Be3 Rc7 36.Kc3 f5 37.Kb2 Ke6 38.Kc3 Bd5+ 39.Kb2 Be4 40.a5 bxa5 41.Rb5 a4 42.Rc5 Rb7+ 43.Ka3 a6 44.Kxa4 Bd5 45.Ka5 Ke5 46.Kxa6 Rb3 47.Rc7 Ke4 48.Rh7 (diagram) Rxe3 49.fxe3 Kxe3 50.Rxh5 Be4 51.Rh8 Kf3 52.Re8 Kxg3 53.h5 Bd3+ 54.Kb6 f4 55.Kc5 f3 56.Kd4 Bf5 57.Rf8 Kf4 58.h6 g3 59.h7 g2 60.h8=Q g1=Q+ 61.Kc4 Qc1+ 62.Kb3 Qc2+ 63.Kb4 Qe4+ 64.Kc3 Qc6+ 65.Kb3 Qd5+ 66.Kc3 Qc5+ 67.Kb2 Qb4+ 68.Ka2 ½–½

==== Game 11: Fischer–Spassky, 1–0 (Sicilian Rossolimo) ====
Fischer–Spassky, game 11

Position: a8 black rook, c8 black bishop, d8 black queen, e8 black king, g8 black knight, h8 black rook, a7 black pawn, d7 black pawn, f7 black pawn, g7 black bishop, h7 black pawn, c6 black pawn, g6 black pawn, c5 black pawn, e5 black pawn, b4 white pawn, e4 white pawn, f3 white knight, a2 white pawn, c2 white pawn, d2 white pawn, f2 white pawn, g2 white pawn, h2 white pawn, a1 white rook, b1 white knight, c1 white bishop, d1 white queen, e1 white rook, g1 white king

Fischer's innovation: 7.b2–b4!?

Position: a8 black rook, f8 black king, h8 black rook, a7 black pawn, b7 black bishop, d7 black queen, f7 black pawn, h7 black pawn, d6 white knight, g6 black pawn, h6 white knight, b4 black pawn, e4 white pawn, b2 black bishop, c2 white pawn, f2 white pawn, g2 white pawn, h2 white pawn, a1 white rook, d1 white queen, e1 white rook, g1 white king

Position after 17.Nxh6

September 20. Fischer innovates with a tactical gambit 7.b4!? Spassky could have evened the game with 13...Ne7 (Timman).

Sicilian Defence: Rossolimo Variation (ECO B31)
1.e4 c5 2.Nf3 Nc6 3.Bb5 g6 4.Bxc6 bxc6 5.0-0 Bg7 6.Re1 e5 7.b4 (first diagram) cxb4 8.a3 c5 9.axb4 cxb4 10.d4 exd4 11.Bb2 d6 12.Nxd4 Qd7 13.Nd2 Bb7 14.Nc4 Nh6 15.Nf5 Bxb2 16.Ncxd6+ Kf8 17.Nxh6 (second diagram) f6 18.Ndf7 Qxd1 19.Raxd1 Ke7 20.Nxh8 Rxh8 21.Nf5+ gxf5 22.exf5+ Be5 23.f4 Rc8 24.fxe5 Rxc2 25.e6 Bc6 26.Rc1 Rxc1 27.Rxc1 Kd6 28.Rd1+ Ke5 29.e7 a5 30.Rc1 Bd7 31.Rc5+ Kd4 32.Rxa5 b3 33.Ra7 Be8 34.Rb7 Kc3 35.Kf2 b2 36.Ke3 Bf7 37.g4 Kc2 38.Kd4 b1=Q 39.Rxb1 Kxb1 40.Kc5 Kc2 41.Kd6 1–0

=== Belgrade venue ===
==== Game 12: Spassky–Fischer, 1–0 (KID Sämisch Panno) ====
Spassky–Fischer, game 12

Position: c8 black bishop, d8 black queen, f8 black bishop, g8 black king, f7 black rook, g7 black rook, h7 black knight, b6 black pawn, d6 black pawn, g6 black knight, a5 black pawn, b5 white knight, c5 black pawn, d5 white pawn, e5 black pawn, g5 white pawn, h5 white rook, a4 white pawn, c4 white pawn, e4 white pawn, f4 black pawn, g4 white pawn, f3 white knight, h3 white queen, b2 white pawn, d2 white bishop, e2 white bishop, c1 white king, h1 white rook

Position after 29...Rbf7

September 30. Instead of 15...c5, better for Fischer was 15...c6 16.Qb3 and White has a slight advantage (Balasov).

King's Indian Defence: Sämisch Variation, Panno Variation (ECO E83)
1.d4 Nf6 2.c4 g6 3.Nc3 Bg7 4.e4 d6 5.f3 0-0 6.Be3 Nc6 7.Nge2 a6 8.h4 h5 9.Nc1 e5 10.d5 Ne7 11.Be2 Nh7 12.Nd3 f5 13.a4 Nf6 14.Nf2 a5 15.Qc2 c5 16.0-0-0 b6 17.Rdg1 Nh7 18.Nb5 Kh8 19.g4 hxg4 20.fxg4 f4 21.Bd2 g5 22.hxg5 Ng6 23.Rh5 Rf7 24.Rgh1 Bf8 25.Qb3 Rb8 26.Qh3 Rbb7 27.Nd3 Kg8 28.Ne1 Rg7 29.Nf3 Rbf7 (diagram) 30.Rh6 Qd7 31.Qh5 Qxg4 32.Rxg6 Qxh5 33.Rxg7+ Rxg7 34.Rxh5 Bg4 35.Rh4 Bxf3 36.Bxf3 Nxg5 37.Bg4 Rh7 38.Rxh7 Kxh7 39.Kc2 Be7 40.Kd3 Kg6 41.Nc7 Kf7 42.Ne6 Nh7 43.Bh5+ Kg8 44.Be1 Nf6 45.Bh4 Kh7 46.Bf7 Nxd5 47.cxd5 Bxh4 48.Bh5 Kh6 49.Be2 Bf2 50.Kc4 Bd4 51.b3 Kg6 52.Kb5 Kf6 53.Kc6 Ke7 54.Ng7 1–0

==== Game 13: Fischer–Spassky, ½–½ (Sicilian Rossolimo) ====
Fischer–Spassky, game 13

Position: c8 black rook, c7 black rook, d7 black king, e7 black pawn, f7 black bishop, a6 black pawn, c6 black pawn, d6 black pawn, f6 black bishop, g6 black pawn, a5 white knight, f5 black knight, b4 white pawn, d4 white pawn, h4 black pawn, a3 white pawn, d3 white king, f3 white pawn, h3 white pawn, c2 white rook, d2 white bishop, e2 white knight, g2 white pawn, c1 white rook

Position after 42...Rbc8

October 1. Fischer could have kept a slight edge with 14.Qxa6 Bxa6 15.Na5! Rfc8 16.Be3 Rab8 17.b3 f5 18.exf5 gxf5 19.Rac1 (Matulović).

Sicilian Defence: Rossolimo Variation (ECO B31)
1.e4 c5 2.Nf3 Nc6 3.Bb5 g6 4.Bxc6 bxc6 5.0-0 Bg7 6.Re1 f6 7.c3 Nh6 8.d4 cxd4 9.cxd4 0-0 10.Nc3 d6 11.Qa4 Qb6 12.Nd2 Nf7 13.Nc4 Qa6 14.Be3 Qxa4 15.Nxa4 f5 16.exf5 Bxf5 17.Rac1 Rfc8 18.Na5 Bd7 19.b3 Rab8 20.Nc3 Kf8 21.a3 Nh6 22.b4 Nf5 23.Red1 Ke8 24.Ne4 Rb5 25.h3 h5 26.Rd2 a6 27.Kf1 Rd5 28.Rcd1 Rb5 29.Ke2 Be6 30.Rc1 Kd7 31.Nc3 Rbb8 32.Kf1 h4 33.Ke2 Bf6 34.Ne4 Bd5 35.Kd3 Bg7 36.Rdc2 Rc7 37.Re1 Rf8 38.f3 Rb8 39.Nc3 Bg8 40.Ne2 Bf7 41.Bd2 Bf6 42.Rec1 Rbc8 (diagram) 43.Nc4 Rb7 44.Na5 Rbc7 45.Nc4 Rb7 ½–½

==== Game 14: Spassky–Fischer, ½–½ (QGA Classical) ====
Spassky–Fischer, game 14

Position: a8 black rook, c8 black rook, g8 black king, b7 black bishop, d7 black knight, f7 black pawn, g7 black pawn, h7 black pawn, a6 black pawn, e6 black pawn, f6 black knight, b5 black pawn, c5 black bishop, b3 white pawn, e3 white pawn, f3 white knight, a2 white pawn, b2 white bishop, d2 white knight, e2 white bishop, f2 white pawn, g2 white pawn, h2 white pawn, c1 white rook, d1 white rook, g1 white king

Position after 13...Rfc8

October 3. After 19...Rc7 the game was even (Damljanović).

Queen's Gambit Accepted: Classical Variation (ECO D27)
1.d4 d5 2.c4 dxc4 3.Nf3 Nf6 4.e3 e6 5.Bxc4 c5 6.0-0 a6 7.dxc5 Qxd1 8.Rxd1 Bxc5 9.b3 b5 10.Be2 Bb7 11.Bb2 Nbd7 12.Nbd2 0-0 13.Rac1 Rfc8 (diagram) 14.h3 Kf8 15.Kf1 Ke7 16.Ne1 Bd6 17.a4 Bc6 18.axb5 axb5 19.Rc2 Rc7 20.Rdc1 Rac8 21.Bf3 Bxf3 22.Ndxf3 e5 23.Rxc7 Rxc7 24.Rxc7 Bxc7 25.Nc2 Ne4 26.Na3 b4 27.Nc4 f6 28.Ne1 Ndc5 29.Nc2 Nxb3 30.Nxb4 Nbd2+ 31.Nxd2 Nxd2+ 32.Ke2 Nc4 ½–½

==== Game 15: Fischer–Spassky, ½–½ (Catalan Closed) ====
Fischer–Spassky, game 15

Position: d8 black rook, e8 black rook, g8 black king, a7 black pawn, e7 black queen, f7 black pawn, h7 black pawn, g6 black pawn, c5 black pawn, d5 black bishop, c4 white knight, b3 white queen, c3 white rook, e3 black pawn, f3 white pawn, g3 white pawn, a2 white pawn, b2 white pawn, e2 white pawn, h2 white pawn, c1 white rook, g1 white king

Position after 22...g6

October 4. After 19.f3 the game was even.

Catalan Opening: Closed Variation (ECO E07)
1.c4 e6 2.Nf3 Nf6 3.g3 d5 4.Bg2 Be7 5.0-0 0-0 6.d4 Nbd7 7.Nbd2 b6 8.cxd5 exd5 9.Ne5 Bb7 10.Ndf3 Ne4 11.Bf4 Ndf6 12.Rc1 c5 13.dxc5 bxc5 14.Ng5 Nxg5 15.Bxg5 Ne4 16.Bxe7 Qxe7 17.Bxe4 dxe4 18.Nc4 e3 19.f3 Rad8 20.Qb3 Rfe8 21.Rc3 Bd5 22.Rfc1 g6 (diagram) 23.Qa3 Bxf3 24.exf3 e2 25.Re1 Rd1 26.Kf2 Rxe1 27.Kxe1 Qd7 28.Qb3 Qh3 29.Ne3 Qxh2 30.g4 Rb8 31.Qd5 Rxb2 32.Qd8+ Kg7 33.Nf5+ gxf5 ½–½

==== Game 16: Spassky–Fischer, 0–1 (King's Indian) ====
Spassky–Fischer, game 16

Position: c8 black king, d8 black rook, f8 black rook, a7 black pawn, b7 black pawn, d7 black bishop, e7 black pawn, d6 black pawn, f6 black queen, h6 black pawn, c5 black pawn, d5 white pawn, e5 black knight, c4 white pawn, e4 white queen, h4 white pawn, d3 white bishop, g3 white knight, a2 white pawn, c2 white rook, f2 white pawn, g2 white pawn, g1 white king, h1 white rook

Position after 21...0-0-0

October 7. The players reached a Benoni Defense (ECO A56) after 5...Bg7, which transposed to a King's Indian Defence after 6.Bg5. Spassky should have played 9.Qd2 Nh5 10.Be2 Nxg3 11.hxg3 a6 12.Nf3 Nd7 13.0-0 Rb8 14.a4 with a slight advantage for White (Minev).

King's Indian Defence (ECO E70)
1.d4 Nf6 2.c4 c5 3.d5 d6 4.Nc3 g6 5.e4 Bg7 6.Bg5 h6 7.Bh4 g5 8.Bg3 Qa5 9.Bd3 Nxe4 10.Bxe4 Bxc3 11.bxc3 Qxc3+ 12.Kf1 f5 13.Rc1 Qf6 14.h4 g4 15.Bd3 f4 16.Ne2 fxg3 17.Nxg3 Rf8 18.Rc2 Nd7 19.Qxg4 Ne5 20.Qe4 Bd7 21.Kg1 0-0-0 (diagram) 22.Bf1 Rg8 23.f4 Nxc4 24.Nh5 Qf7 25.Qxc4 Qxh5 26.Rb2 Rg3 27.Be2 Qf7 28.Bf3 Rdg8 29.Qb3 b6 30.Qe3 Qf6 31.Re2 Bb5 32.Rd2 e5 33.dxe6 Bc6 34.Kf1 Bxf3 0–1

==== Game 17: Fischer–Spassky, 1–0 (Sicilian Closed) ====
Fischer–Spassky, game 17

Position: e8 black rook, g8 black king, a7 black pawn, b7 black pawn, d7 black queen, f7 black pawn, g7 black pawn, h7 black pawn, c6 black knight, e6 black bishop, c5 black pawn, d4 black pawn, f4 white bishop, g4 white pawn, d3 white pawn, f3 white queen, h3 white pawn, a2 white pawn, b2 white pawn, c2 white pawn, f2 white pawn, g2 white bishop, a1 white rook, g1 white king

Position after 20.Qf3

October 10. Spassky had the possibility 16...Qe7!? 17.Qd1 Re8 18.Qf3 Bc8 with an even game (Matanović).

Sicilian Defence: Closed Variation (ECO B23)
1.e4 c5 2.Nc3 Nc6 3.Nge2 e6 4.g3 d5 5.exd5 exd5 6.Bg2 d4 7.Nd5 Nf6 8.Nef4 Nxd5 9.Nxd5 Bd6 10.0-0 0-0 11.d3 Be6 12.Nf4 Bf5 13.h3 Rb8 14.Bd2 Re8 15.Re1 Rxe1+ 16.Qxe1 Qd7 17.g4 Re8 18.Qd1 Bxf4 19.Bxf4 Be6 20.Qf3 (diagram) Nb4 21.Qxb7 Nxc2 22.Rc1 Qxb7 23.Bxb7 Nb4 24.Be4 Bxa2 25.Bd2 Bd5 26.Bxd5 Nxd5 27.Rxc5 Nb6 28.Kf1 f6 29.Ra5 Re7 30.Bb4 Rd7 31.Bc5 Kf7 32.Ke2 g5 33.Kf3 Kg6 34.Ke4 h5 35.Bxd4 Re7+ 36.Kf3 h4 37.Bc5 Re1 38.Rxa7 Nd5 39.Bf8 Re8 40.Bd6 Re6 41.Rd7 Nb6 42.Rd8 Nd5 43.b4 Re1 44.b5 Rb1 45.Rb8 Rb3 46.Ke4 Nc3+ 47.Kd4 Nxb5+ 48.Kc4 Rc3+ 49.Kxb5 Rxd3 50.Kc6 Rxh3 51.Kd5 Rf3 52.Ke6 Rxf2 53.Rg8+ Kh7 54.Kf7 Ra2 55.Rg7+ Kh6 56.Bf8 Ra7+ 57.Kxf6 Ra6+ 58.Kf7 1–0

==== Game 18: Spassky–Fischer, ½–½ (QGA Classical) ====
Spassky–Fischer, game 18

Position: b8 black knight, c8 black bishop, c7 black bishop, e7 black king, h7 black pawn, a6 black pawn, f6 black pawn, g6 black pawn, b5 black pawn, c5 white knight, b4 white pawn, c4 black knight, e4 white bishop, f4 white pawn, a3 white pawn, d3 white knight, h3 white pawn, b2 white bishop, g2 white pawn, g1 white king

Position after 29...Nc4

October 11. After 20.Na5 Spassky had a slight edge.

Queen's Gambit Accepted: Classical Variation (ECO D27)
1.d4 d5 2.c4 dxc4 3.Nf3 a6 4.e3 Nf6 5.Bxc4 e6 6.0-0 c5 7.dxc5 Qxd1 8.Rxd1 Bxc5 9.Nbd2 0-0 10.a3 b5 11.Be2 Bb7 12.b4 Be7 13.Bb2 Nbd7 14.Rac1 Rfc8 15.Nb3 Rxc1 16.Rxc1 Rc8 17.Rxc8+ Bxc8 18.Nfd4 Nb8 19.Bf3 Kf8 20.Na5 Bd6 21.Ndb3 e5 22.Nc5 Ke7 23.h3 Nfd7 24.Nd3 f6 25.Be4 g6 26.f4 exf4 27.exf4 Nb6 28.Nb7 Bc7 29.Nbc5 Nc4 (diagram) 30.Bc1 Nd7 31.Kf1 Nxc5 32.Nxc5 Bb6 33.Bd3 Bxc5 34.bxc5 Be6 35.Kf2 Kd7 36.Bxc4 Bxc4 ½–½

==== Game 19: Fischer–Spassky, ½–½ (Sicilian Closed) ====
Fischer–Spassky, game 19

Position: h7 black king, c5 black pawn, c4 white pawn, d4 white pawn, h4 black queen, c3 white king, e3 white queen

Position after 67...Kh7

October 14. Instead of 14.Rb1, 14.f5 would have yielded a slight edge to Fischer (Matanović).

Sicilian Defence: Closed Variation (ECO B23)
1.e4 c5 2.Nc3 Nc6 3.Nge2 e5 4.Nd5 Nge7 5.Nec3 Nxd5 6.Nxd5 Be7 7.g3 d6 8.Bg2 h5 9.h4 Be6 10.d3 Bxd5 11.exd5 Nb8 12.f4 Nd7 13.0-0 g6 14.Rb1 f5 15.b4 b6 16.bxc5 bxc5 17.c4 0-0 18.Qa4 Bf6 19.Rb7 Nb6 20.Qb5 Rf7 21.Rxf7 Kxf7 22.Bd2 Rb8 23.Qc6 Nc8 24.Re1 Ne7 25.Qa4 Qc7 26.Kh2 exf4 27.Bxf4 Be5 28.Re2 Rb6 29.Kh3 Ng8 30.Rxe5 dxe5 31.Bxe5 Qe7 32.d6 Rxd6 33.Bxd6 Qxd6 34.Bd5+ Kf8 35.Qxa7 Ne7 36.Qa8+ Kg7 37.Qb7 Kf8 38.a4 f4 39.a5 fxg3 40.a6 Qf4 41.Bf3 Nf5 42.Qe4 g2 43.Qxf4 g1=Q 44.Be4 Qa1 45.a7 Qxa7 46.Bxf5 gxf5 47.Qxf5+ Kg7 48.Qg5+ Kf8 49.Qh6+ Kg8 50.Qxh5 Qc7 51.Qg6+ Kh8 52.Qf6+ Kg8 53.Qe6+ Kh8 54.Qd5 Qf7 55.Kg2 Qg6+ 56.Kh3 Qf7 57.Qe5+ Kh7 58.Kg4 Qg6+ 59.Kf4 Qh6+ 60.Kf3 Qg6 61.Qe4 Kh8 62.Ke2 Qd6 63.Qe3 Qh2+ 64.Kd1 Qh1+ 65.Kd2 Qh2+ 66.Kc3 Qxh4 67.d4 Kh7 (diagram) 68.d5 Qf6+ 69.Kc2 Qd6 70.Qg5 Kh8 71.Kd2 Qb6 72.Qe5+ Kg8 73.Qe8+ Kg7 74.Qb5 Qc7 75.Kc2 Kf8 76.Qa6 Qh2+ 77.Kb3 Qb8+ 78.Qb5 Qc7 79.Ka3 Qa7+ 80.Kb3 Ke7 81.Kc2 Kd8 82.Kd2 Qc7 83.Qa6 Qf4+ 84.Kc2 Qe4+ ½–½

==== Game 20: Spassky–Fischer, 1–0 (Sicilian Closed) ====
Spassky–Fischer, game 20

Position: a8 black bishop, b8 black rook, c8 black rook, g8 black king, c7 black queen, d7 black knight, e7 black knight, f7 black pawn, g7 black bishop, h7 black pawn, d6 black pawn, e6 black pawn, g6 black pawn, a5 black pawn, g5 white pawn, b4 black pawn, c4 white knight, d4 white knight, e4 white pawn, f4 white pawn, b3 white pawn, d3 white pawn, h3 white pawn, a2 white rook, c2 white pawn, d2 white queen, g2 white bishop, f1 white rook, g1 white bishop, h1 white king

Position after 23.Nc4

October 15. After 14.g4 Spassky had a slight edge (Acers, Ciamara).

Sicilian Defence: Closed Variation (ECO B24)
1.e4 c5 2.Ne2 Nf6 3.Nbc3 e6 4.g3 Nc6 5.Bg2 Be7 6.0-0 d6 7.d3 a6 8.a3 Qc7 9.f4 b5 10.Kh1 0-0 11.Be3 Bb7 12.Bg1 Rab8 13.h3 Ba8 14.g4 b4 15.axb4 cxb4 16.Na4 Nd7 17.Qd2 Rfc8 18.b3 a5 19.g5 Bf8 20.Ra2 Ne7 21.Nd4 g6 22.Nb2 Bg7 23.Nc4 (diagram) d5 24.Nxa5 dxe4 25.dxe4 e5 26.Ne2 exf4 27.Nxf4 Ne5 28.Nd3 Rb5 29.Nxe5 Qxe5 30.Nc4 Qxg5 31.Be3 Qh4 32.Nd6 Bc3 33.Qf2 Qxf2 34.Rxf2 Rbb8 35.Nxc8 Rxc8 36.Ra7 Kf8 37.Bh6+ Ke8 38.Bg5 f6 39.Bxf6 Bxf6 40.Rxf6 Bc6 41.Kg1 Bd7 42.Rd6 Bc6 43.Bf1 1–0

==== Game 21: Fischer–Spassky, 1–0 (Sicilian Taimanov) ====
Fischer–Spassky, game 21

Position: b8 black rook, g8 black king, f7 black pawn, g7 black pawn, c6 black bishop, d6 white knight, e6 black pawn, h6 black pawn, b5 black pawn, c5 white pawn, e5 white pawn, a4 black queen, d4 black rook, f4 white pawn, g3 white pawn, h3 white pawn, a2 white pawn, c2 white rook, e2 white queen, h2 white king, e1 white rook

Position after 35...Qa4

October 17. After 16.Qd2, Fischer had a slight advantage.

Sicilian Defence: Taimanov Variation, Szén Variation (ECO B44)
1.e4 c5 2.Nf3 Nc6 3.d4 cxd4 4.Nxd4 e6 5.Nb5 d6 6.c4 Nf6 7.N5c3 Be7 8.g3 0-0 9.Bg2 a6 10.0-0 Rb8 11.Na3 Qc7 12.Be3 Bd7 13.Rc1 Ne5 14.h3 Rfc8 15.f4 Ng6 16.Qd2 Be8 17.Rfd1 b6 18.Qf2 h6 19.Kh2 Qa7 20.Qe2 Qc7 21.Bf3 Bc6 22.Nab1 Qb7 23.Nd2 b5 24.cxb5 axb5 25.b4 Qa8 26.Rc2 d5 27.e5 Ne4 28.Bxe4 dxe4 29.Bc5 Bxc5 30.bxc5 Rd8 31.Re1 Ne7 32.Ncxe4 Nf5 33.Nb3 Nd4 34.Nxd4 Rxd4 35.Nd6 Qa4 (diagram) 36.f5 Ra8 37.Rb2 Qa3 38.fxe6 fxe6 39.Nxb5 Bxb5 40.Qxb5 Rd3 41.Rg2 Qc3 42.Ree2 Ra3 43.Rc2 Qxe5 44.Rce2 Re3 45.Rxe3 Rxe3 46.a4 Rc3 47.c6 Qd6 48.c7 Rxc7 49.Qb8+ Kh7 50.a5 h5 51.h4 Qc5 52.a6 Rf7 53.Qb1+ Kh6 54.Qa2 Re7 55.Qd2+ Kg6 56.Re2 Kh7 57.Qc2+ Qxc2 58.Rxc2 Kg6 59.Ra2 Ra7 60.Ra5 e5 61.Kg2 Kf6 62.Kf2 Ke6 63.Ke3 Kf5 64.Kf3 g6 65.Ra3 g5 66.hxg5 Kxg5 67.Ke4 1–0

==== Game 22: Spassky–Fischer, ½–½ (Sicilian Closed) ====
Spassky–Fischer, game 22

Position: d8 black queen, e8 black knight, f8 black rook, g8 black king, a7 white rook, e7 black pawn, f7 black pawn, g7 black bishop, h7 black pawn, c6 black bishop, d6 black pawn, g6 black pawn, e4 white pawn, f4 white pawn, c3 white knight, e3 white bishop, g3 white pawn, h3 white pawn, b2 black rook, c2 white pawn, g2 white bishop, d1 white queen, f1 white rook, g1 white king

Position after 16...Rxb2

October 18. After 18...Nc7 the game was even.

Sicilian Defence: Closed Variation (ECO B25)
1.e4 c5 2.Ne2 Nf6 3.Nbc3 d6 4.g3 Nc6 5.Bg2 g6 6.0-0 Bg7 7.d3 0-0 8.h3 Rb8 9.f4 Bd7 10.Be3 b5 11.a3 Ne8 12.d4 cxd4 13.Nxd4 b4 14.Nxc6 Bxc6 15.axb4 Rxb4 16.Rxa7 Rxb2 (diagram) 17.e5 Bxg2 18.Kxg2 Nc7 19.exd6 exd6 20.Na4 Ra2 21.Bb6 Qe8 22.Rxc7 Qxa4 23.Qxd6 Rxc2+ 24.Rxc2 Qxc2+ 25.Bf2 Qe4+ 26.Kg1 ½–½

==== Game 23: Fischer–Spassky, ½–½ (Sicilian Closed) ====
Fischer–Spassky, game 23

Position: c8 black rook, e8 black rook, f8 black bishop, a7 black pawn, b7 black pawn, f7 black pawn, g7 black king, h7 black pawn, c6 black knight, e6 black bishop, g6 black pawn, c5 black pawn, d5 white knight, d4 black pawn, e4 white knight, g4 white pawn, a3 white pawn, d3 white pawn, h3 white pawn, b2 white pawn, c2 white pawn, f2 white pawn, g2 white bishop, a1 white rook, e1 white rook, g1 white king

Position after 19...Be6

October 21. After 19...Be6 the game was even.

Sicilian Defence: Closed Variation (ECO B23)
1.e4 c5 2.Nc3 e6 3.Nge2 Nc6 4.g3 d5 5.exd5 exd5 6.d3 Nf6 7.Bg2 Be7 8.Bg5 d4 9.Bxf6 Bxf6 10.Ne4 Be7 11.Nf4 0-0 12.0-0 Re8 13.Qh5 g6 14.Qd5 Bf5 15.Rfe1 Kg7 16.a3 Rc8 17.h3 Qxd5 18.Nxd5 Bf8 19.g4 Be6 (diagram) 20.Nef6 Red8 21.g5 Bd6 22.Re4 Ne7 23.Rh4 Rh8 24.Re1 Nf5 25.Rhe4 h6 26.h4 hxg5 27.hxg5 Rh4 28.Rxh4 Nxh4 29.Re4 Nf5 30.Nf4 Ba2 31.N4d5 Bxd5 32.Nxd5 Kf8 33.Kf1 Re8 34.Rxe8+ Kxe8 35.Nf6+ Kd8 36.Bxb7 Bf4 37.Ne4 Bc1 38.a4 Bxb2 39.Nxc5 Bc1 40.Be4 Bxg5 41.Bxf5 gxf5 42.Nb3 Bf6 43.Kg2 Kd7 44.Kg3 Ke6 45.Na5 Be5+ 46.Kh4 Bf6+ 47.Kh5 Kd5 48.Kh6 Kc5 49.Kh7 Kb4 50.Nc6+ Kc3 51.Kg8 Kxc2 52.Kxf7 Bh8 53.a5 Kxd3 54.a6 Ke2 55.Nxa7 d3 56.Nc6 d2 57.a7 d1=Q 58.a8=Q Qd5+ 59.Kg6 Qe6+ 60.Kh7 Bc3 61.Nd8 Qe7+ 62.Kg6 Qf6+ 63.Kh5 Qh8+ 64.Kg6 Qg7+ 65.Kxf5 Qf6+ 66.Kg4 Qg6+ 67.Kf4 Bd2+ 68.Ke5 Bc3+ 69.Kf4 Qd6+ 70.Kf5 Qd7+ 71.Kg5 Qe7+ 72.Kf5 Qf6+ 73.Kg4 Qg7+ 74.Kf5 Qf6+ 75.Kg4 Qg6+ 76.Kf4 Bd2+ 77.Ke5 Qg5+ 78.Ke6 Qg4+ 79.Kf7 Qd7+ 80.Kg6 ½–½

==== Game 24: Spassky–Fischer, ½–½ (Sicilian Dragon) ====
Spassky–Fischer, game 24

Position: c8 black rook, f8 black rook, a7 black pawn, d7 black queen, e7 black pawn, f7 black pawn, g7 black king, d6 black pawn, f6 black knight, g6 black pawn, h6 black pawn, d5 white pawn, c4 white pawn, d4 white knight, f4 white pawn, g3 white pawn, a2 white pawn, d2 white queen, h2 white pawn, c1 white rook, f1 white rook, g1 white king

Position after 24.bxc4

October 24. After 14...Kh7 the game was even.

Sicilian Defence: Dragon Variation (ECO B70)
1.e4 c5 2.Ne2 Nf6 3.Nbc3 d6 4.g3 g6 5.Bg2 Nc6 6.0-0 Bg7 7.d4 cxd4 8.Nxd4 Bg4 9.Nde2 Qc8 10.f3 Bh3 11.Bxh3 Qxh3 12.Bg5 0-0 13.Qd2 h6 14.Be3 Kh7 15.Rac1 Qd7 16.Nd5 Nxd5 17.exd5 Ne5 18.b3 b5 19.Bd4 Rac8 20.f4 Ng4 21.Bxg7 Kxg7 22.Nd4 Nf6 23.c4 bxc4 24.bxc4 (diagram) e6 25.dxe6 fxe6 26.Rfe1 Rfe8 27.Nb3 a6 28.Qd4 Rc6 29.Red1 e5 30.fxe5 Rxe5 31.Qxe5 dxe5 32.Rxd7+ Nxd7 33.Rd1 Nf6 34.c5 Kf7 35.Rc1 Nd7 36.Kf2 Ke6 37.Ke3 Kd5 38.Rd1+ Ke6 39.Rc1 Kd5 ½–½

==== Game 25: Fischer–Spassky, 1–0 (Sicilian Scheveningen) ====
Fischer–Spassky, game 25

Position: b8 black rook, f8 black rook, h8 black king, f7 black pawn, g7 white rook, h7 white pawn, d6 black pawn, e6 black bishop, f6 black queen, e5 black pawn, b4 black pawn, e4 white pawn, b3 white pawn, d3 white bishop, c2 white pawn, g2 white queen, b1 white king, g1 white rook

Final position after 35.h7

October 28.

Sicilian Defence: Scheveningen Variation, English Attack (ECO B80)
1.e4 c5 2.Nc3 Nc6 3.Nge2 e6 4.d4 cxd4 5.Nxd4 d6 6.Be3 Nf6 7.Qd2 Be7 8.f3 a6 9.0-0-0 0-0 10.g4 Nxd4 11.Bxd4 b5 12.g5 Nd7 13.h4 b4 14.Na4 Bb7 15.Nb6 Rb8 16.Nxd7 Qxd7 17.Kb1 Qc7 18.Bd3 Bc8 19.h5 e5 20.Be3 Be6 21.Rdg1 a5 22.g6 Bf6 23.gxh7+ Kh8 24.Bg5 Qe7 25.Rg3 Bxg5 26.Rxg5 Qf6 27.Rhg1 Qxf3 28.Rxg7 Qf6 29.h6 a4 30.b3 axb3 31.axb3 Rfd8 32.Qg2 Rf8 33.Rg8+ Kxh7 34.Rg7+ Kh8 35.h7 1–0

==== Game 26: Spassky–Fischer, 1–0 (King's Indian) ====
Spassky–Fischer, game 26

Position: e8 black knight, g8 black king, f7 black knight, h7 black pawn, a6 black pawn, d6 black pawn, g6 black pawn, h6 white pawn, c5 black pawn, d5 white pawn, f5 black pawn, g5 white pawn, c4 white pawn, f4 white pawn, g3 white knight, a2 white pawn, b2 black bishop, d2 white bishop, g2 white king, b1 white bishop

Position after 35...Bb2

October 29. The players reached a Benoni Defense (ECO A56) after 6.Bd3, which transposed to a King's Indian Defence after 7.Nf3. After 16.g4! Spassky had a slight edge (Krnić).

King's Indian Defence (ECO E90)
1.d4 Nf6 2.c4 c5 3.d5 d6 4.Nc3 g6 5.e4 Bg7 6.Bd3 0-0 7.Nf3 Bg4 8.h3 Bxf3 9.Qxf3 Nbd7 10.Qd1 e6 11.0-0 exd5 12.exd5 Ne8 13.Bd2 Ne5 14.Be2 f5 15.f4 Nf7 16.g4 Nh6 17.Kg2 Nc7 18.g5 Nf7 19.Rb1 Re8 20.Bd3 Rb8 21.h4 a6 22.Qc2 b5 23.b3 Rb7 24.Rbe1 Rxe1 25.Rxe1 Qb8 26.Bc1 Qd8 27.Ne2 bxc4 28.bxc4 Ne8 29.h5 Re7 30.h6 Bh8 31.Bd2 Rb7 32.Rb1 Qb8 33.Ng3 Rxb1 34.Qxb1 Qxb1 35.Bxb1 Bb2 (diagram) 36.Kf3 Kf8 37.Ke2 Nh8 38.Kd1 Ke7 39.Kc2 Bd4 40.Kb3 Bf2 41.Nh1 Bh4 42.Ka4 Nc7 43.Ka5 Kd7 44.Kb6 Kc8 45.Bc2 Nf7 46.Ba4 Kb8 47.Bd7 Nd8 48.Bc3 Na8+ 49.Kxa6 Nc7+ 50.Kb6 Na8+ 51.Ka5 Kb7 52.Kb5 Nc7+ 53.Ka4 Na8 54.Kb3 Kc7 55.Be8 Kc8 56.Bf6 Nc7 57.Bxg6 hxg6 58.Bxd8 1–0

==== Game 27: Fischer–Spassky, ½–½ (Ruy Lopez Exchange) ====
Fischer–Spassky, game 27

Position: c6 black pawn, b5 black pawn, c5 black bishop, e5 black pawn, f5 white knight, h5 black king, a4 black pawn, c4 black pawn, e4 white pawn, a3 white pawn, c3 white pawn, f3 white king, b2 white pawn, g2 white pawn

Final position after 46...Bc5

October 31. If 14.b3 instead (to prevent 14...Nc4), then either 14...Bd6 or 14...c4 15.f3 give a level game (Balashov).

Ruy Lopez: Exchange Variation (ECO C69)
1.e4 e5 2.Nf3 Nc6 3.Bb5 a6 4.Bxc6 dxc6 5.0-0 f6 6.d4 exd4 7.Nxd4 c5 8.Ne2 Qxd1 9.Rxd1 Bd7 10.Nbc3 Ne7 11.Bf4 0-0-0 12.Rd2 Ng6 13.Bg3 Ne5 14.Bxe5 fxe5 15.Rad1 c4 16.Kf1 Bc5 17.Ng1 Bg4 18.Rxd8+ Rxd8 19.Rxd8+ Kxd8 20.Nce2 Ke7 21.Ke1 b5 22.c3 Kf6 23.h3 Bh5 24.Ng3 Bf7 25.Nf3 g6 26.Nf1 g5 27.Ke2 Bg6 28.N3d2 h5 29.Ne3 c6 30.Kf3 Bf7 31.Ndf1 a5 32.Ke2 Be6 33.Ng3 Kg6 34.a3 Bf7 35.Ngf5 Be6 36.Kf3 Bd7 37.Kg3 Be6 38.h4 Bd7 39.hxg5 Kxg5 40.Nh4 Bg4 41.Nxg4 hxg4 42.Nf5 a4 43.f3 gxf3 44.Kxf3 Bf8 45.Ne3 Kh5 46.Nf5 Bc5 ½–½

==== Game 28: Spassky–Fischer, ½–½ (KID Sämisch Panno) ====
Spassky–Fischer, game 28

Position: e8 black bishop, h8 black rook, b7 black pawn, e7 black queen, f7 black pawn, g7 black king, h7 black rook, c6 black pawn, d6 black pawn, g6 black pawn, a5 black pawn, c5 black knight, d5 white pawn, e5 black pawn, g5 white pawn, a4 white pawn, c4 white pawn, e4 white pawn, h4 white pawn, b3 white pawn, c3 white knight, g3 white queen, a2 white king, f2 white rook, d1 white bishop, h1 white rook

Final position after 35...Be8

November 1. After 15.0-0-0 Spassky had a slight advantage.

King's Indian Defence: Sämisch Variation, Panno Variation (ECO E83)
1.d4 Nf6 2.c4 g6 3.Nc3 Bg7 4.e4 d6 5.f3 0-0 6.Be3 Nc6 7.Nge2 a6 8.h4 h5 9.Nc1 e5 10.d5 Nd4 11.Nb3 Nxb3 12.Qxb3 Kh7 13.Be2 Bh6 14.Bxh6 Kxh6 15.0-0-0 Kg7 16.Kb1 Qe7 17.Rdg1 Rh8 18.g4 hxg4 19.fxg4 Nd7 20.g5 Nc5 21.Qd1 a5 22.Rf1 Bd7 23.Qe1 Rh7 24.Qg3 Rf8 25.Rf6 Rfh8 26.b3 Bc8 27.Bg4 Bd7 28.Bd1 Be8 29.Bg4 Bd7 30.Bd1 Be8 31.Rf2 c6 32.a4 Qd8 33.Ka2 Qe7 34.Bg4 Bd7 35.Bd1 Be8 ½–½

==== Game 29: Fischer–Spassky, ½–½ (Ruy Lopez Breyer) ====
Fischer–Spassky, game 29

Position: a8 black rook, f8 black rook, g8 black king, b7 black bishop, d7 black knight, e7 black queen, f7 black pawn, g7 black pawn, d6 black pawn, h6 black pawn, c5 black pawn, e5 white pawn, b4 black pawn, e4 black knight, b3 white bishop, f3 white knight, h3 white pawn, a2 white pawn, b2 white pawn, f2 white pawn, g2 white pawn, a1 white rook, b1 white knight, d1 white queen, e1 white rook, g1 white king

Position after 18...Qxe7

November 4. After 22...Nb6, Spassky had a slight advantage.

Ruy Lopez: Breyer Variation (ECO C95)
1.e4 e5 2.Nf3 Nc6 3.Bb5 a6 4.Ba4 Nf6 5.0-0 Be7 6.Re1 b5 7.Bb3 d6 8.c3 0-0 9.h3 Nb8 10.d4 Nbd7 11.c4 c6 12.cxb5 axb5 13.Nc3 Bb7 14.Bg5 b4 15.Nb1 h6 16.Bh4 c5 17.dxe5 Nxe4 18.Bxe7 Qxe7 (diagram) 19.exd6 Qf6 20.Nbd2 Nxd6 21.Nc4 Nxc4 22.Bxc4 Nb6 23.Ne5 Rae8 24.Bxf7+ Rxf7 25.Nxf7 Rxe1+ 26.Qxe1 Kxf7 27.Qe3 Qg5 28.Qxg5 hxg5 29.b3 Ke6 30.a3 Kd6 31.axb4 cxb4 32.Ra5 Nd5 33.f3 Bc8 34.Kf2 Bf5 35.Ra7 g6 36.Ra6 Kc5 37.Ke1 Nf4 38.g3 Nxh3 39.Kd2 Kb5 40.Rd6 Kc5 41.Ra6 Nf2 42.g4 Bd3 43.Re6 Kd5 44.Rb6 Kc5 45.Re6 ½–½

==== Game 30: Spassky–Fischer, 0–1 (KID Sämisch Panno) ====
Spassky–Fischer, game 30

Position: a8 black rook, c8 black bishop, d8 black queen, f8 black rook, g8 black king, e7 black pawn, f7 black pawn, g7 black bishop, b6 black pawn, d6 black pawn, g6 black pawn, a5 black pawn, c5 black knight, h5 white pawn, a4 white pawn, b4 black knight, c4 white pawn, d4 white knight, e4 white pawn, g4 white pawn, c3 white knight, e3 white bishop, b2 white pawn, e2 white bishop, a1 white rook, d1 white queen, e1 white king, h1 white rook

Position after 16...Nc5!

November 5. After 13.g4? (13.Qd2!?) hxg4! 14.fxg4 c5 15.h5 cxd4 16.Nd4 Nc5! Fischer had the upper hand (Krnić).

King's Indian Defence: Sämisch Variation, Panno Variation (ECO E83)
1.d4 Nf6 2.c4 g6 3.Nc3 Bg7 4.e4 d6 5.f3 0-0 6.Be3 Nc6 7.Nge2 a6 8.h4 h5 9.Nc1 Nd7 10.Nb3 a5 11.a4 Nb4 12.Be2 b6 13.g4 hxg4 14.fxg4 c5 15.h5 cxd4 16.Nxd4 Nc5 (diagram) 17.Nd5 Bb7 18.Nf5 gxf5 19.gxf5 Bxd5 20.exd5 Bxb2 21.Kf1 Qd7 22.Qb1 Bxa1 23.Rg1+ Kh8 24.Qxa1+ f6 25.Qb1 Rg8 26.Rg6 Rxg6 27.hxg6 Kg7 0–1

== See also ==
- World Chess Championship 1972
