= Battery (chess) =

Chess formation

Position: a8 black rook, d8 black king, h8 black rook, a7 black pawn, b7 black pawn, d7 black pawn, f7 black pawn, g7 black bishop, h7 black pawn, c6 black knight, g6 black pawn, c3 white knight, d3 white rook, f3 white knight, a2 white pawn, b2 white pawn, c2 white pawn, f2 white pawn, g2 white pawn, h2 white pawn, d1 white rook, g1 white king

The white rooks form a battery to capture the pawn protecting the black king.

A battery in chess is a formation that consists of two or more pieces on the same rank, file, or diagonal. It is a tactic involved in planning a series of captures to remove the protection of the opponent's king, or to simply gain a material advantage in the exchanges.

Other chess authors limit battery to "an arrangement of two pieces in line with the enemy king on a rank, file, or diagonal so that if the middle piece moves a discovered check will be delivered." However, in Chessgames.com blogs and game annotations of other chess websites, the term is also used in cases where moving the middle piece will uncover a threat other than a check along the opened line.

== Discussion and examples ==
It is particularly effective to form a battery using rooks because they may be combined to occupy the same rank or file. In theory, bishops may also form a battery in a case of underpromotion of a pawn to a bishop occupying the same diagonal as the other bishop. In actual games, however, the queen and rooks are usually employed.

Batteries are often used as part of a combination which may involve other types of chess tactics as well. In some chess openings, the queen is often involved in the set up, and becomes part of a battery but is reserved for the final capture in the series of exchange of pieces. For example, in the main line of the Closed Sicilian characterized by 1.e4 c5 2.Nc3 Nc6 3.g3 g6 4.Bg2 Bg7 5.d3 d6, where White's main options are 6.Be3 followed by Qd2 and 0-0-0; and 6.f4 followed by Nf3 and 0-0, White's intention is to form a battery with the rooks.

Position: a8 black rook, b8 black knight, d8 black queen, e8 black king, h8 black rook, a7 black pawn, b7 black pawn, e7 black pawn, f7 black pawn, g7 black bishop, h7 black pawn, d6 black pawn, f6 black knight, g6 black pawn, f4 white pawn, c3 white knight, d3 white pawn, e3 white rook, f3 white knight, g3 white pawn, a2 white pawn, b2 white pawn, c2 white pawn, e2 white queen, g2 white bishop, h2 white pawn, c1 white king, e1 white rook

It is often more effective to involve the queen in forming a battery with the rooks as shown. The battery is attacking the pawn protecting the black king. In this situation, Black has to defend the pawn to be captured, with the bishop, with either of the knights, or by playing e6.

== See also ==
- Alekhine's gun, a specific type of battery involving both rooks and the queen
