= Jezdimir Vasiljević =

Serbian criminal and television personality (born 1948)

- Born: 2 November 1948 (age 77); Topolovnik, PR Serbia, FPR Yugoslavia
- Other name: Gazda Jezda (Boss Jezda)

Jezdimir Vasiljević (Serbian Cyrillic: Јездимир Васиљевић; born 2 November 1948) is a Serbian convicted criminal and former television personality. He is most known for running a nation-wide Ponzi scheme in the Federal Republic of Yugoslavia from 1991 to 1993, through the Jugoskandik Savings Bank. He unsuccessfully ran for President of Serbia in the 1992 election.

Vasiljević also organized and sponsored the 1992 match between Bobby Fischer and Boris Spassky, which took place in the exclusive resort of Sveti Stefan and drew significant media attention both in Yugoslavia and abroad. Since Yugoslavia was under UN sanctions at the time, participation in the match caused Bobby Fischer legal trouble and practically forced him to live as an émigré.

According to some sources, Vasiljević's initial investment capital was made through a marriage with a Swedish woman from a wealthy family. The Jugoskandik was established in 1991, and had its banking licence provided by Banka Privatne Privrede (BPP), bank owned by the local government of Montenegro (another constituent republic within Yugoslavia).

The origin of the fictitious revenue meant to support the unrealistically high interests to depositors was claimed by Vasiljević to be coming from investments made through mechanisms meant to bypass internationally imposed sanctions and import oil into Yugoslavia via Montenegrin seaports. However, Jugoskandik itself was merely a front for a Ponzi Scheme (the scheme has more commonly been described in his country as a Pyramid scheme, although the two terms are not entirely identical in meaning).

The Jugoskandik collapse in 1993, together with the almost simultaneous collapse of another pyramidal bank, Dafiment, represented a disastrous blow to the Serbian economy, already weakened by the Yugoslav Wars. An estimated 80,000 people were left without their money. Vasiljević sued the Republic of Montenegro in 1993, but without success. He fled Yugoslavia on 8 March 1993, becoming a fugitive.

Vasiljević made claims that, in early 1993, he supplied the Serbian side in the Yugoslav wars with a "Hertz-machine", allegedly a machine which kills people via phone by emitting strong frequencies. Such claims were almost immediately debunked by the Serbian media.

In 2001, Vasiljević and the PBB's ex-CEO were charged separately for embezzlement. In 2004, Vasiljević's trial began in front of the Serbian court of law; he escaped to the Netherlands, where he was arrested and extradited to Serbia. He was sentenced to five years of prison.

In 2013, Vasiljević entered the popular TV reality show "Farma", where some contestants confronted him regarding their missing savings. He was kicked off due to low votes.
