= Nikolai Selivanovsky =

NKVD officer

Nikolai Selivanovsky was an officer in the NKVD and a Deputy Head of SMERSH during World War Two. Following the war Selivanovsky become the deputy head of the Ministry of State Security (MGB). He was also the chief Soviet advisor to the Polish Ministry of Public Security after the war.

== World War Two ==
During the Battle of Stalingrad Selivanovsky was a Senior NKVD Major and the head of Special Sections for the Stalingrad Front. He reported on the conditions of the Soviet soldiers in Stalingrad in great detail to Viktor Abakumov. His detailed reports were important in helping Stalin and Soviet generals gauge the moral of the Red Army defenders as well as assess the performance of its commanders.

In 1943 Selivanovsky was in charge of SMERSH efforts to infiltrate agents into the rear areas of the German army.
