= Alekhine's Gun (video game) =

2016 video game

- Developer: Maximum Games (Note: Originally developed by Haggard Games (2010–2014))
- Publisher: Maximum Games
- Series: Death to Spies
- Platforms: Microsoft Windows; PlayStation 4 Xbox One
- Release: Microsoft Windows: NA: March 1, 2016; EU: March 11, 2016; PlayStation 4, Xbox One: NA: March 1, 2016; EU: March 25, 2016
- Genre: Stealth action
- Mode: Single-player

Alekhine's Gun (previously known as Death to Spies 3: Ghost of Moscow) is a third-person stealth action video game set during World War II and the Cold War developed and published by Maximum Games. It was released on March 1, 2016, for Microsoft Windows, PlayStation 4 and Xbox One. It is the third installment in the Death to Spies series. Alekhine's Gun features open maps with multiple methods to complete levels. The name is borrowed from that of a powerful chess formation used by former World Champion Alexander Alekhine in a match against fellow grandmaster Aron Nimzowitsch.

== Gameplay ==
The protagonist is Semyon Strogov, designated as Agent "Alekhine", a KGB agent recruited by the CIA. The game takes place primarily during the 1960s era of the Cold War, with flashback missions set in World War II. The game features eleven missions which are set in Austria, Cuba, Florida, Germany, New York City, Norway, Sweden, Switzerland, and Texas. Each mission is described as being non-linear in design, featuring multiple ways of completing tasks. The plot features around historical events such as the Bay of Pigs Invasion and the assassination of U.S. President John F. Kennedy. The game allows players to choose between straightforward shootouts or more subtle stealth-orientated gameplay with the use of items such as poison and garrotes and by staging "accidents" as distractions or means of eliminating targets. Each mission can be replayed differently to improve the player's performance. At the end of each level the player receives a different ranking depending on their style of play such as "Maniac" or "Ghost". They are also graded on "Noise", "Violence", "Accuracy" and "Professionalism". In addition, points are awarded which can be used to buy or upgrade weapons and equipment.

== Plot ==
On November 22, 1963, CIA officer Vincent Rambaldi commits suicide after his family is murdered an hour after President John F. Kennedy's assassination.

A year earlier, KGB Colonel Semyon Strogov is questioned by his superior about his first meeting with Rambaldi. In 1943, Strogov had infiltrated Bergenhus Castle in Norway, occupied by Waffen-SS forces conducting experiments to develop a "super-soldier serum", and eliminated German scientist Dr. Hans Heinrich and his handler, SS commander Martin Fichtner. While escaping, he found Rambaldi held captive in an underground cell. After agreeing to swap documents taken from Heinrich's office in return for his freedom, the two men escaped together.

A year later, Strogov is sent to a hotel in neutral Switzerland to identify and kill a mole in Soviet intelligence and retrieve stolen information from Paolo Minelli, an Italian diplomat and Abwehr contact. Upon finishing the mission, he discovers Rambaldi outside and learns that he also sought the documents but was misled by a captured Soviet operative about where Minelli was staying. The two are ambushed by Gestapo agents monitoring the hotel, and are forced to fight their way out. Afterwards, Strogov secretly shares the intel with Rambaldi. Their paths cross again when Strogov is assigned to a joint operation with the OSS. Strogov, with Rambaldi's assistance, assassinates Dr. Berthold Stoltz and his assistant Adolf Krause, both key members of the "Uranium Project", in a secret underground facility beneath Salzburg, Austria. On his way out, he is discovered by German soldiers, but Rambaldi's partner, Andrew Pearson, rescues him when he's held at gunpoint.

In October 1963, Strogov and his collaboration with Rambaldi is fully reviewed by his superior and a fellow agent, KGB Lieutenant Vera Pavlova. Strogov and Vera, posing as a married couple, travel to New York and make contact with Rambaldi, who is working on exposing an anti-government conspiracy within the CIA to trigger a war between the United States and the Soviet Union. Given the code-name "Alekhine", Strogov is informed that no government official or intelligence agency should learn about his mission, otherwise he and Vera will be disavowed. Vera and Strogov rendezvous with Rambaldi, who takes them to his safe house, where he and Pearson have put together a small team of trustworthy CIA agents.

Rambaldi explains to Strogov that the conspirators are working with the Mafia to sabotage American bases and defense assets. He requests that Strogov go to the Red Dragon, a social club in New York's Chinatown, where mafia soldier Paul Capello and CIA analyst Terrence Shaw are meeting to review details of the operation. Strogov sneaks in, assassinates the targets, and obtains Capello's plans. His next mission takes him to the headquarters of a biker gang in Texas, as their president, Alejandro Vargas, is a longtime CIA informant suspected of abducting a reporter investigating his gang. Strogov goes to Texas and discovers that the reporter was tortured to death. He eliminates Vargas's second-in-command Phil Munson, abducts Vargas himself, and brings him to Rambaldi. Vargas discloses the existence of training camps for preparing soldiers, but Pearson accidentally kills him in interrogation before he can reveal anything else.

Strogov goes to Miami, where he kills the boss and consigliere of the Cataldo crime family, both of whom are involved in the conspiracy, while framing their rivals for the murders. Rambaldi identifies one of the camps, located just off the coast of Miami, and has Vera drive Strogov to its location, where he kills the commandant and plants tracking devices on the ships. Strogov finds that he is growing closer to Vera, who asks him to retire from the KGB after their mission is complete. Having learned that Rambaldi also intends to retire to spend more time with his family, Strogov seriously considers the possibility.

A second camp, located near Cuba, is dismantled by the Cuban military after Strogov sends them a transmission from the camp's radio, kills the officer in charge, and steals sensitive documents. When he returns to find Vera, he discovers her on the verge of death, learning that the group has been betrayed. Vera dies, but not before urging Strogov to finish their mission. Forced to act alone, Strogov foils a plot by Cuban saboteurs and a disgruntled Navy captain to blow up an aircraft carrier and frame the Soviets. A few hours later, President Kennedy is killed, followed by the murder of Rambaldi's family and his suicide. Strogov finds a memo left to him by Rambaldi, deducing that Pearson is the traitor. Having anticipated this, Pearson has Strogov arrested in New York, having already contacted both the CIA and the FBI to frame him for the deaths of Rambaldi's team.

Strogov breaks out of custody, steals back the evidence against him from police lockup, and abducts Pearson to question him. Pearson reveals that the two primary leaders of the conspiracy are Admiral Bruce Gardner, a senior Kennedy administration official, and an unnamed German man with ties to the Department of Defense. Strogov kills Pearson and locates the conspiracy's leaders, who have taken refuge in a high-security military bunker in an undisclosed location to finalize their plans.

Strogov infiltrates the base, assassinates Gardner, and finds the office of the unnamed German. Stepping inside, he is held at gunpoint by the man, who turns out to be a former high-level Nazi officer who once ran the Bergen operation that Strogov dismantled in 1943. The latter explains that after the surrender of Germany, he deliberately surrendered to the Americans and was recruited as an American asset to work in intelligence. He used this position to resurrect his primary goal of bringing about a new world order by manipulating the United States into declaring war on Communism. Strogov kills him and exposes the conspiracy to the CIA, who arrest the other top conspirators. Vice President Lyndon B. Johnson assumes Kennedy's office and seeks a new peace with the Soviet Union.

In 1964, a retired Strogov visits Vincent Rambaldi's grave, pays him homage, salutes as a fellow soldier, and quietly walks away.

== Development ==
The game was first announced in 2010 by 1C Company under the title Death to Spies 3: Ghost of Moscow, developed by Haggard Games. In 2011, 1C Company withdrew from the publishing contract. Haggard Games continued developing the title. A crowdfunding campaign was launched on Indiegogo in 2013 and another on Kickstarter in 2014, both of which failed. In June 2014, Maximum Games was announced as the new publisher and developer making it their first in-house game.

== Release ==
The game was originally set to be released on November 10, 2015, for Microsoft Windows, PlayStation 4 and Xbox One but was delayed to February 9, 2016, due to a delay with the console versions and to allow for a simultaneous worldwide release. A pre-order edition is available for PlayStation 4 and Xbox One featuring a limited edition chess piece. Then, it was delayed once again to March 1, 2016.

== Reception ==
Reception

Aggregate scores
Aggregator	Score
GameRankings	35.00%
Metacritic	36/100

Review score
Publication	Score
Hardcore Gamer	2/5

Alekhine's Gun has received negative reviews from critics, scoring 36/100 on Metacritic, and 35.00% on GameRankings.

Jason Bohn of Hardcore Gamer gave the game a 2-out-of-5, saying, "The right ideas are in place, but everything about the execution falls flat on its face. Considering how much I wanted to enjoy this, the average player probably won't be able to handle a full playthrough."

== Possible sequel ==
In late 2019, it was announced by Haggard Games that they had regained the rights to the Death to Spies franchise from Maximum Games and that they had begun development on a new project entitled Death to Spies X. From time to time, the studio would release development builds of the project on their YouTube channel, showing off the games mechanics and how it was improved over its predecessor.[1] They are currently in the final stages of the pre-alpha phase and plan to start a Kickstarter for the project as soon as its finished.

== See also ==
- Death to Spies, the first video game in the series.
- Death to Spies: Moment of Truth, the second video game in the series.
