= Dmitri Pavlov (composer) =

Russian composer (born 1959)

Dmitri Aleksandrovich Pavlov is a Russian composer and director based in Berlin. He is known for his work as a film composer and perhaps best known for his score for the film The Cuckoo (Кукушка in Russian) directed by Aleksandr Rogozhkin.

Apart from music for film, Dmitri Pavlov has written for ballet, theatre and orchestra. He formed Pavlov Ballet in 1992, and also arranged for the "Spirit of Mozart'"concert in Vienna, commemorating the 250th anniversary of Mozart's birth. One of his works is Concerto for piano, computer and orchestra, which breaks boundaries and successfully merges sampled computer generated sounds with classical. He composed the orchestral works for The Song of the Little Mermaid, a 2004 ballet in two acts choreographed by Kim Sun-hee.

He used computer generated sounds in the recording of The Fall of Babylon, biblical Allegory for Choir and Orchestra, which is based on Old and New Testament Texts.

Pavlov studied music theory at Rimsky-Korsakov Saint Petersburg State Conservatory.

== Film music ==
Dmitri Pavlov has written music for the following films:

- 1988 "Bells of the North", director - M Micheev
- 1988 "Requiem", director - K Artjuchov
- 1988 "Return", director - A Golovin
- 1989 "Alexander Nevsky", director - A Golovin
- 1989 "The Lost Soul", director - M Micheev
- 1990 "The Paternal House" The House of F Dostoievsky, director - M Micheev
- 1992 "Kolyma", director - M Micheev
- 1992 "Maximilian Voloshin" director - A Rjabokon
- 1993 "Tchekist", director A.Rogozhkin
- 1994 "Boule de Suif" film-ballet, produced by "Telefilm", director - Alexander Tikhonov
- 1994 "Cameo Gonzaga", 1994, director - L Volkov
- 1994 "Physiology of Russian Life " / Great Russian physiologist Ivan Pavlov, director - I Alimpiev
- 2002 "The Cuckoo", director A Rogozhkin
- 2003 "Sapiens"(short film), director A Rogozhkin
- 2004 "The one's strange life", music for a film serial, director A Rogozhkin
- 2006 "Peregon" director A Rogozhkin
- 2008 "Igra" (ORT), director A Rogozhkin

== Awards ==
Pavlov has won awards for his compositions, including the 2004 State Prize from the Russian Federation.

== See also ==
- The Cuckoo (film)
