= Alekhine's gun =

Chess formation

Alekhine vs. Nimzowitsch, 1930

Position: b8 black rook, f8 black king, a7 black pawn, c7 black rook, d7 black queen, e7 black knight, g7 black pawn, a6 white pawn, b6 black pawn, c6 black knight, e6 black pawn, h6 black pawn, b5 white bishop, d5 black pawn, e5 white pawn, f5 black pawn, b4 white pawn, d4 white pawn, f4 white pawn, c3 white rook, f3 white knight, c2 white rook, g2 white pawn, h2 white pawn, c1 white queen, g1 white king

Position after 26.Qc1

Alekhine's gun is a formation in chess named (by Jeremy Silman) after the former world chess champion Alexander Alekhine. It is a specific kind of battery. This formation was named after a game he played against Aron Nimzowitsch in San Remo, in 1930, ending with Alekhine's decisive victory.

== Concept ==
The idea consists of placing the two rooks stacked one behind another and the queen at the rear. This can lead to substantial material loss for the opponent, as it places considerable pressure on the "target" of the gun, especially if it is pinned (in the scenario shown on the right it was only four moves before resignation).

== Original "Alekhine's gun" game ==
Here is the game that spawned Alekhine's gun:

Alexander Alekhine vs. Aron Nimzowitsch, San Remo 1930:
1. e4 e6 2. d4 d5 3. Nc3 Bb4 4. e5 c5 5. Bd2 Ne7 6. Nb5 Bxd2+ 7. Qxd2 0-0 8. c3 b6 9. f4 Ba6 10. Nf3 Qd7 11. a4 Nbc6 12. b4 cxb4 13. cxb4 Bb7 14. Nd6 f5 15. a5 Nc8 16. Nxb7 Qxb7 17. a6 Qf7 18. Bb5 N8e7 19. 0-0 h6 20. Rfc1 Rfc8 21. Rc2 Qe8? 22. Rac1 Rab8 23. Qe3 Rc7 24. Rc3 Qd7 25. R1c2 Kf8 26. Qc1 (diagram; this is the point at which Alekhine forms the gun) 26... Rbc8 27. Ba4 (threatening 28.b5, winning the pinned knight) b5 28. Bxb5 Ke8 29. Ba4 Kd8 (guarding c7, so that the knight can move away on 30.b5) 30. h4! (but now all Black's pieces are committed to the defence against the gun, and he is running out of moves) h5 31. Kh2 g6 32. g3 (zugzwang) 1–0

== Other games ==
Six years later, in 1936, Alekhine defeated William Winter using Alekhine's gun again. Since then, players have learned much about using and guarding against this formation; however, some modern international games are still decided by this tactic. In November 2018, it was successfully used by Ju Wenjun against Kateryna Lagno in game 4 of the FIDE Women's World Championship. The attack could have been refuted with perfect defense, but Lagno was unable to find it and resigned five moves later. Ju Wenjun went on to win the match and with it the title. Bobby Fischer used Alekhine's gun in game 1 of his 1992 match against Boris Spassky to penetrate Spassky's queenside.

== In popular culture ==
The video game Alekhine's Gun is named after this chess formation.

The weapon of the character Solomon from the video game Deadlock shares the name of the chess formation.
