= A Trial in Prague =

A Trial in Prague is an 83 min colour documentary film directed by Zuzana Justman, about the Slánský trial, a high-profile show trial in 1952 Communist Czechoslovakia.

== Content ==
At the height of the Cold War, an infamous political show trial, known as the Slánský trial, took place in Czechoslovakia. In 1952, 14 leading Communists, including Rudolf Slánský, the second most powerful man in the country, were tried on charges of high treason and espionage. Although they were innocent of the charges, they confessed and were convicted. Most of the men were hanged, but three received life sentences. Eleven of the fourteen were Jews.

The film tells the story of the trial and the paranoia of the period through testimonies, trial footage, archival films and extensive documentation. Among the people who appear in the film as interviewees are Lise London, whose late husband Artur London was one of the defendants and wrote about the trial in a widely published memoir The Confession; Eduard Goldstucker, a Kafka scholar and the first Czech ambassador to Israel who was jailed and forced to testify at the trial; and Jan Kavan, the former Czech Minister of Foreign Affairs, whose father, also a trial defendant, died shortly after his release from prison. The widows of defendants Rudolf Margolius and Otto Šling are also interviewed: Heda Margolius Kovály and Marian Šlingová-Fagan.

What led these men to their passionate belief in Communism and why did they publicly confess to crimes they did not commit? The film explores the questions, as well as the role of Moscow, the motives for the trial and its anti-Semitic thrust. It deals with the personal stories of the condemned men and the legacy they left their children, who "feel a need to live out the interrupted lives of their fathers".

== Comments ==
Metacritic, which uses a weighted average, assigned the film a score of 68 out of 100, based on 5 critics, indicating "generally favorable" reviews.

"Sensitive, intelligent & moving ... shows the human face of both communism and its victims" - New York Times

"Harrowing and enlightening, a tale that even Kafka would find hard to imagine" (Boston Phoenix).

"Measured, informative...neatly structured" (Variety).

“The film is as compelling for these painful details as for the tough-minded analysis that ties them together.” ( The Village Voice)

“Powerful, important and refreshingly straightforward documentary.” (New York Post)

== Sources ==
Slánská, Josefa (1969). Report On My Husband. London: Hutchinson. ISBN 0-09-097320-8.

London, Artur (1971). Confession. USA: Ballantine Books. ISBN 0-345-22170-2.

Margolius, Ivan (2006). Reflections of Prague: Journeys through the 20th century. Chichester: Wiley. ISBN 0-470-02219-1.

Kaplan, Karel (1990). Report on the Murder of the General Secretary. London: I. B. Tauris & Co. ISBN 1-85043-211-2.

Heda Margolius Kovaly (1997) Under a Cruel Star: A life in Prague 1941-1968 (ISBN 0-8419-1377-3).
