= Jan Hanuš (composer) =

Czech composer (1915–2004)

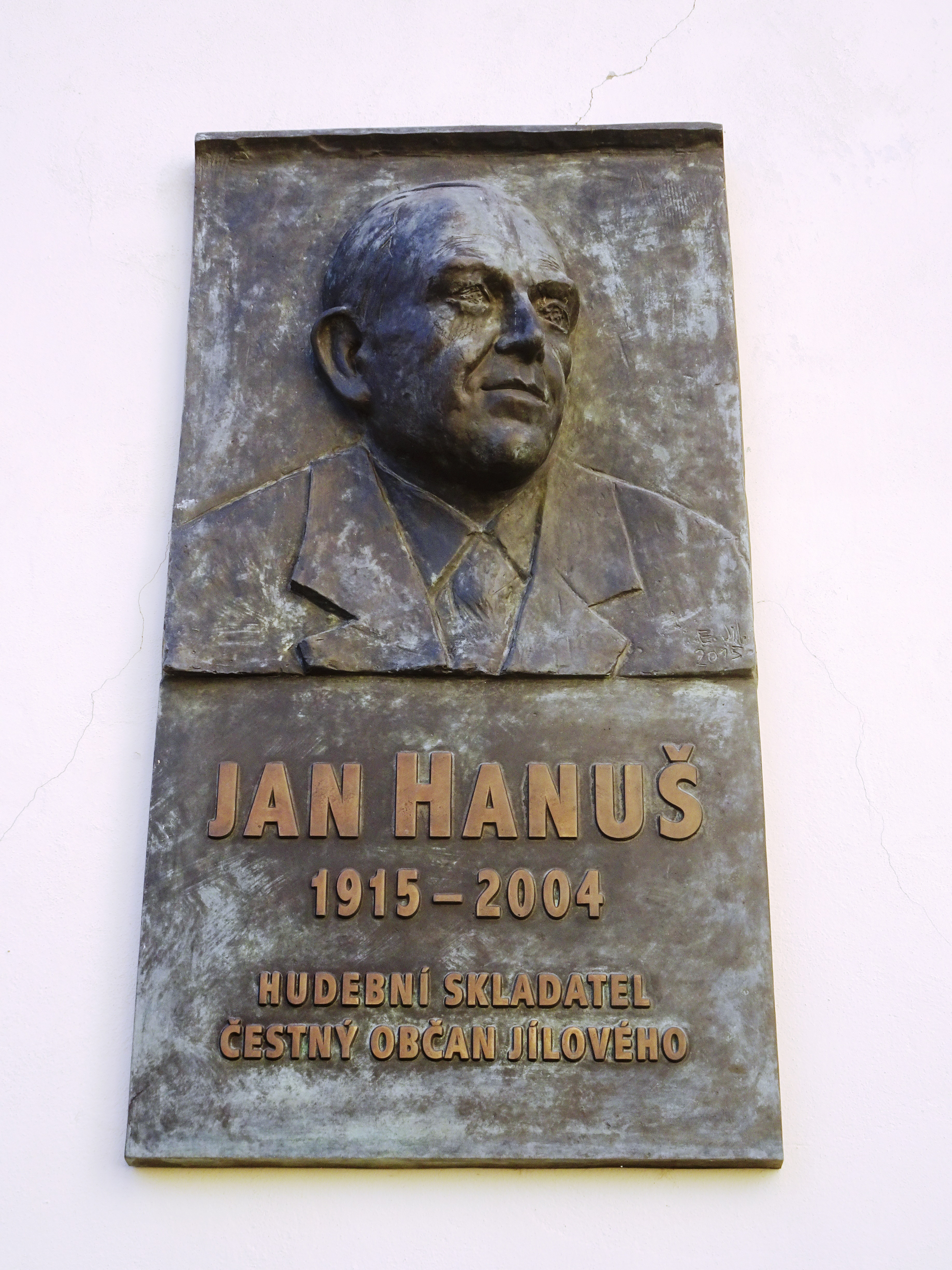
Memorial plaque for Jan Hanuš in Jílové u Prahy

Jan Hanuš (May 2, 1915 – July 30, 2004) was a prolific Czech composer of the 20th century. Almost every category of composition is represented among his works, many of which are overtly political, expressing anti-Nazi, anti-Fascist and anti-Communist sentiments.

== Biography ==
Hanuš studied composition independently with Otakar Jeremiáš while attending school at the Prague Conservatory, where he graduated in 1940. He subsequently studied at a business school, and then worked both as editor and editor-in-chief of several major publishing houses, including F. A. Urbánek & Sons, and Panton (Müller 2001). As an editor he played an important role in overseeing the editions of the collected works of Antonín Dvořák and Zdeněk Fibich, both of whom he later emulated in his works, as well as the complete works of Leoš Janáček (Müller 2001). Hanuš's early works were principally aimed at the passionate, the philosophic, and the patriotic, as exhibited in his opera The Flames. The first post-war decade witnessed lyricism near to national tradition, but since the late fifties a new tendency of dramaticism in his works arose and a musically expressive innovation, reaching as far as the combination of traditional classics with electronics (as seen in the opera The Torch of Prometheus) was born. During the seventies and eighties, his work synthesized all of his preceding influences. Much of Hanuš's work is inspired by the work of Czech authors, most notably Jaroslav Seifert (Müller 2001).

After the Velvet revolution in 1989 Hanuš returned all the honours bestowed on him by the Communist regime. In 1999 Václav Havel rewarded Hanuš with a Medal of Merit. During the 1950s Hanuš bravely and publicly defended his friend Rudolf Margolius who was the victim of the Slánský trial.

== Selection of works ==
=== Operas ===
- The Flames, Opera-rhapsody on the text by Hanuš and J. Pokorny, op. 14 (1944)
- Salt above Gold, Ballet in five pictures after the popular fairy-tale by Božena Němcová, op. 28 (1953)
- Othello, Dance drama in 7 pictures after Shakespeare, op. 36 (1955)
- The Servant of Two Masters, Opera in 5 pictures after the comedy by Goldoni, libretto J. Pokorny, op. 42 (1958)
- The Torch of Prometheus, Opera in 3 parts on the motifs of Aeschylus, libretto J. Pokorny, op. 54 (1961)
- The Fairy-tale of One Night, Opera on the motifs of a fairy-tale from A Thousand and one Nights, libretto J. Pokorny, op. 62 (1961)
- Labyrinth, Dance meditations on the motifs of Dante's Divine Comedy, op. 98 (1980)
- Contention over a Goddess, Opera burlesque in Prologue and three pictures after Aristophanes, libretto J. Hanuš, op. 105 (1983)

=== Symphonies ===
- Symphony No.1 in E major for large orchestra and alto solo, on the text of the sequence Stabat mater by Jacopon da Todi, op. 12 (1942)
- Symphony No.2 in G major, op. 26 (1951)
- Symphony No.3 in D minor (The World's Truth, dedicated to the memory of his friend Rudolf Margolius), op.38 (1956)
- Symphony No.4, op. 49 (1960)
- Symphony No.5, op. 58 (1964)
- Symphony No.6, op. 92 (1978)
- Symphony No.7, for orchestra, mixed choir, soprano and baritone solo on Latin sacred texts, op. 116 (1989)

=== Orchestral works ===
- 1st Suite from the ballet Salt above Gold, for orchestra, op. 28a (1952)
- Concertante Symphony for organ, harp, timpani and strings, op. 31 (1953)
- Peter and Lucia, Symphonic fantasia after the story Pierre et Luce by Rolland, op. 35 (1955)
- 1st Suite from the ballet Othello, op. 36a (1956)
- 2nd Suite from the ballet Othello, op.36b (1956)
- Galeria Goldoni, Partia buffa for small orchestra and prepared piano, op. 42a (1977)
- The Secret Trumpeter, Overture for trumpet solo and orchestra after the theme of Whitman, op. 53 (1961)
- Fragments from Prometheia, 1st Suite for symphonic orchestra and electronic sounds, op. 54a (1964)
- Concerto doppio for oboe, harp and orchestra, op.59 (1965)
- Concerto grosso for large brass orchestra, op. 71 (1971)
- Prague Nocturnes (Notturni di Praga) for chamber orchestra, op. 75 (1972)
- Three Essays, Symphonic triptych, op. 86 (1975)
- Three Dantesque Preludes from the ballet Labyrinth for orchestra, op. 98a (1983)
- Variations and Collages for orchestra, op. 99 (1982)
- Passacaglia concertante for two violoncellos, celesta and chamber strings, op. 102 (1984)
- Umbrella from Piccadilly songs for low male voice and orchestra, op. 103 (1984), dedicated to Heda Margolius Kovály
- Variations in the Manner of Aristophanes, for small orchestra and piano, op. 105a (1987)
- Towers of Babylon, symphonic parable about pride, fall and recognition for orchestra, op. 122 (1995)
- Eulogy, Idyll - one movement sinfonietta for orchestra and soprano solo to words by Ladislav Stehlik, op. 16 (1945)

=== Solo and Orchestral works ===
- Concerto for violin and orchestra, op. 112 (1986)
- Concerto-fantasia for violoncello and orchestra, op. 117 (1990)

=== Chamber music ===
- Sonata for cello and piano "Rapsodia", Op.9 (1941, rev.1988)
- Sonatina for viola and piano, Op.37 (1956)
- Concertino for timpani and tape, Op.69 (1973)
- Diptych for cello or viola solo, Op.115 (1988–1989)

== Literature ==
- Hanuš, Jan. 1996. Labyrint svět: svědectví z konce času. Prague: Odeon. ISBN 80-207-0525-2.

== See also ==
- Rudolf Margolius
- Heda Margolius Kovály
