= Otto Šling =

Czechoslovak politician

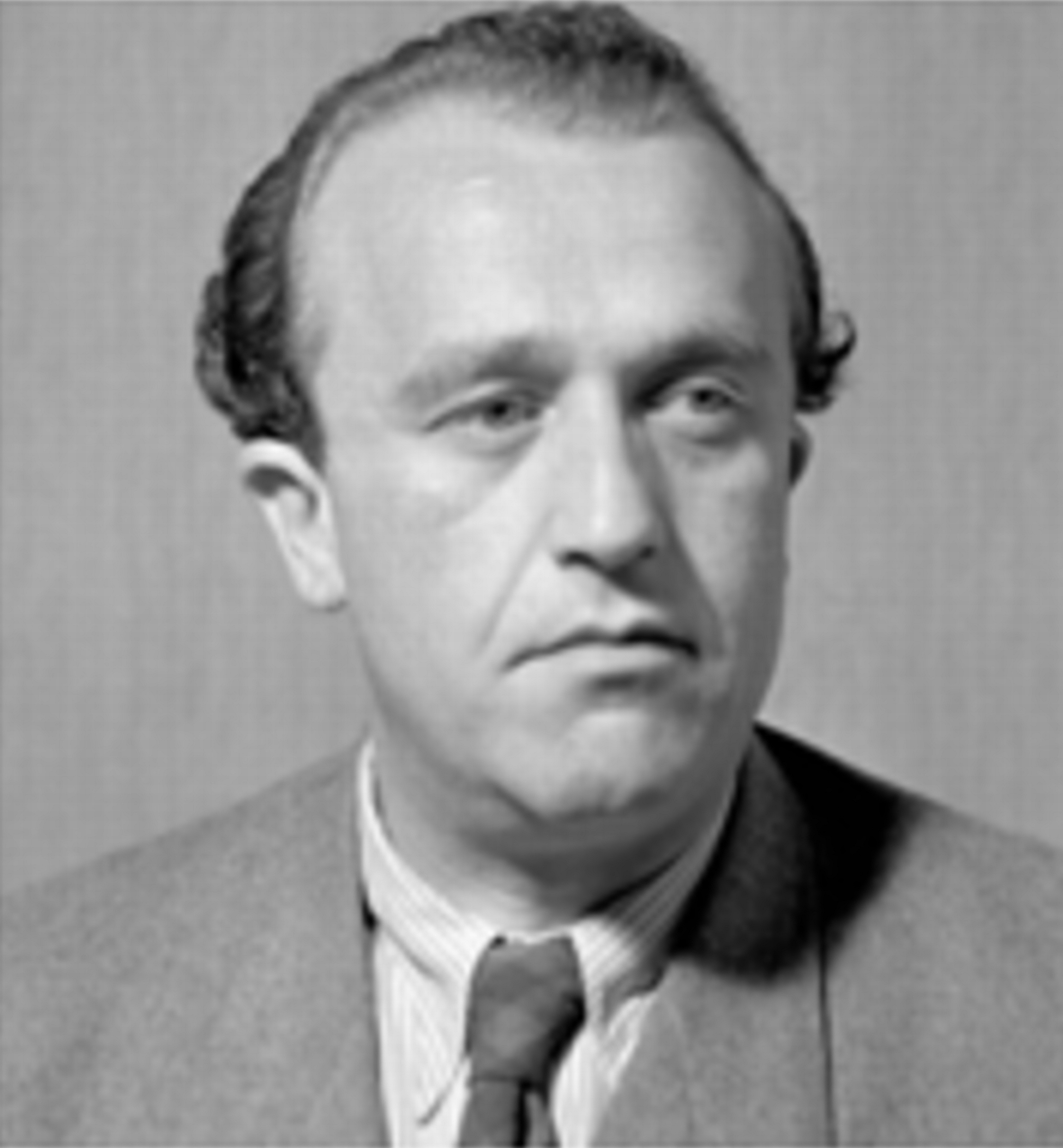
- Born: Otto Schling; August 24, 1912; Nová Cerekev, Kingdom of Bohemia, Austria-Hungary
- Died: December 3, 1952 (aged 40); Pankrác Prison, Prague, Czechoslovak Republic
- Cause of death: Judicial murder
- Education: German Charles-Ferdinand University
- Years active: 1936–1952
- Era: 20th century
- Known for: Defendant in the Slánský trial
- Political party: KSČ
- Movement: Communism
- Criminal penalty: Death by hanging
- Spouse: Marian
- Father: Emil Schling
- Military career
- Allegiance: Communist International
- Brigade: International Brigades
- Conflict: Spanish Civil War

Otto Šling (24 August 1912 – 3 December 1952) was a Czechoslovak politician. He was born into a Jewish family in Nová Cerekev, a market town in south Bohemia, then part of the Austria-Hungary. After World War II, Šling became the Communist Party's Regional Secretary of Brno in Czechoslovakia.

In 1952, Šling fell out of political favor as Stalin was trying to increase his power in Eastern Europe. He was accused of Zionism, convicted and sentenced to death at a show trial, and executed. He was later politically rehabilitated by the Communist Party of Czechoslovakia (KSČ).

== Background ==
Otto Šling was born in 1912, the son of a Jewish factory owner and his wife. In his teenage years, he became politically active and joined the communist movement that developed after the Great War.

After graduating from the German high school of Teplicích, Šling in 1932 entered German Charles-Ferdinand University in Prague to study medicine. He never finished his course or qualified; with the outbreak Spanish Civil War in 1936, he joined the International Brigades in a medical capacity and went to Spain in 1937.

Šling was injured in Spain. After returning home briefly and the German advance into the Sudetenland in 1938, he emigrated to exile in London with others involved in the Communist cause. There he met Marian, whom he married in 1941. During World War II, he worked as the secretary of Young Czechoslovakia, a Communist organization for the émigrés in London.

After the War ended, Šling returned to Czechoslovakia. He was elected to the Provisional National Assembly and became the KSČ Regional Party Secretary of Moravia in Brno. The KSČ took power in a coup in February 1948 amidst little opposition.

== Suppression of dissent ==
Following Yugoslavia’s expulsion from Cominform in 1948, the Communist regimes across Eastern Europe embarked on a period of terror and show trials. In 1949, trials were conducted in Hungary, Poland, and Bulgaria, but prime minister Klement Gottwald asserted that the KSČ had not been infiltrated by any conspirators.

Pressure from the Soviet Union led the KSČ to begin its own search for conspirators. It had to respond to the growing trend in other Eastern European countries (especially obvious in the trial of László Rajk in Hungary) to link internal treason to an international conspiracy.

In the autumn of 1949, there was a push to reaffirm Soviet, not national, socialism, by routing out "bourgeois" nationalists and Zionists, and Šling came under scrutiny. The Rajk trial had revealed the possibility that the center of the international plot was in Czechoslovakia. Šling's name was culled from interrogations from the Hungarian trials, as were the names Artur London and Gustáv Husák.

Up through mid-1950, Šling was still supported by the Central Committee. After he conducted a controversial review of Znojmo district officials, the Party grew more suspicious. In the summer of 1950, Bruno Köhler drafted a resolution on the errors in the Brno Regional Party.

== Arrest and imprisonment ==
On 6 October 1950, Šling was arrested. The only evidence of his conspiring against the Party was a letter of unconfirmed authorship, supposedly sent by Šling to Emanuel Viktor Voska. It did not confirm espionage. Šling's wife and two children were taken to Prague on the night of 5 October. His wife was imprisoned there for more than two years, until the conclusion of his trial. Rudolf Slánský, General Secretary of the KSČ, distanced himself from Šling, although they had been quite close.

The final draft of the resolution, submitted by Köhler and a Central Committee delegation from Prague, accused Šling of being an enemy agent, committing espionage, incorrect methods, suppressing criticism, sabotage, and not recognizing opposition from the class enemy. Šling was expelled from the party. "Šlingism" became synonymous with the slightest deviation from the party line.

By February 1951, fifty people were imprisoned in connection with the Šling investigation, including Marie Švermová. During interrogations, Šling would often confess and then retract his confession. Records indicate that Šling was conscious that the investigations were shaped by Moscow. Eventually, he believed that he had to be sacrificed for the Party. He apparently felt obligated to produce evidence against Slánský when he in turn became the target of investigations.

== The trial ==
The scripted show trial that included Šling, Slánský, and twelve others began on 20 November 1952. All were accused of being Trotskyist-zionist-Titoist-bourgeois-nationalist enemies of the Czech people.

A curious incident occurred during the trial: Šling was wearing the same trousers as at his arrest. Because he had lost so much weight since his arrest, and because the prisoners were not given belts, lest they use them to commit suicide, he had to hold his trousers up with his hands. During his cross-examination, Šling was gesticulating and accidentally let trousers fall down, causing a merry uproar in the courtroom from all, including Šling, except for the interrogators.

In Šling’s closing statement, he said, “I was a treacherous enemy within the Communist Party…I am justly an object of contempt and deserve the maximum and the hardest punishment.” On 27 November 1952, Rudolf Slánský, Bedrich Geminder, Ludvik Frejka, Vladimir Clementis, Bedrich Reicin, Karel Šváb, Rudolf Margolius, Otto Fischl, Otto Šling, and André Simone were sentenced to death; the remaining three, including Eugen Loebl and Artur London, received life sentences.

Šling was executed on 3 December 1952. His last words were, "Mr. President [of the Court], I wish every success to the Communist Party, the Czechoslovak people, and the President of the Republic. I have never been a spy.”

== Rehabilitation and posthumous references to Šling ==
On 21 August 1963, Šling and the others convicted in his trial were officially rehabilitated by the KSČ and acquitted of all indictments. Three years earlier, the USSR had stated publicly that an anti-state conspiracy center had never existed. In the Dubček Government's Commission of Inquiry, Václav Kopecký’s report in February 1951 is labeled a "mass of fabrications, idle gossip, and irresponsible dramatics about the Šling-Švermová case."

This rehabilitation came at a time of de-Stalinization, when governments blamed the previous regimes and ideologies for the current situation. Reports on the trials came out during the Prague Spring period of 1968 in Czechoslovakia, though were quickly suppressed after the invasion of the Warsaw Pact troops in August that year.

== See also ==
- Artur London
- Rudolf Margolius
- Milada Horáková
- Slánský trial

== Sources ==
Please be advised that of the sources used, the Dubček Government's report came out as part of a political push for the reform of socialism, and the Loebl, London, and Šlings texts are all memoirs that reference Czech records.

== Works cited ==
- Crampton, R. J. Eastern Europe in the Twentieth Century – and After. 2nd ed. New York: Routledge, 1994.
- "Executed Czechs ‘Rehabilitated.’" The Times. 22 August 1963, issue 52476: p. 6.
- Loebl, Eugen. My Mind on Trial. New York: Harvest/HBJ, 1976.
- London, Artur. The Confession. New York: William Morrow and Company, Inc, 1970.
- Lukes, Igor. Rudolf Slánský: His Trials and Trial. Cold War International History Project No. 50. (pdf)
- Pelikán, Jiří, ed. The Czechoslovak Political Trials 1950–1954: The Suppressed Report of the Dubček Government's Commission of Inquiry, 1968. Stanford: Stanford University Press, 1971.
- Šlingova, Marian. Truth Will Prevail. London: Merlin Press, Ltd., 1968.
