= Alice Glasnerová =

Czech communist

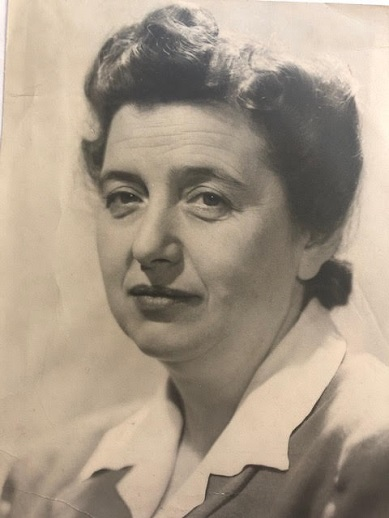
Alice Glasnerová, c. 1950

Alice Glasnerová (17 December 1905 – 19 December 1986) was a Czech communist, who was part of the International Brigades in the Spanish Civil War, working as a hospital administrator in Guadalajara and Benicàssim. She spent World War II in the USA working for the Slovak section of the International Workers Order. On her return to Czechoslovakia in 1946, she worked in the government. When, on Stalin’s orders, Czechoslovakia began a search for an imperialist spy ring in the Slánský trial, she was implicated and accused of espionage as a result of her connection with Noel Field. She was imprisoned for two periods: between July 1949 and March 1950, and again between June 1951 and June 1955. The judgement of the Czech Supreme Court of 15 June 1954, condemning her to eight years in prison, was annulled on 30 June 1955.

== Early life ==
Born in Ružomberok to a wealthy Jewish family, she was the elder of two daughters. She attended the local Piarist (Catholic) school and then studied law at Charles University in Prague. She joined the Communist Party officially in 1938, having been working for them unofficially since 1931.

In 1929, she married MUDr Erwin Kohn and they moved to Žilina, where she worked as a lawyer, one of the first women in Slovakia to do so.www.lookingforalice.com

== Spanish Civil War ==
In 1937 she went to Spain where she worked first in Guadalajara and later in Benicàssim as the hospital administrator. She escaped from Spain in 1938 to France where she was arrested and imprisoned for a month in Perpignan.

== World War II ==
She spent the war years in America, where alongside her work for the International Workers Order (Slovak section), she helped Czech refugees emigrate to America by her work in the American Society for Aid to Democrats of Spain, the American Refugee Relief Society and the American Relief Society for Czechoslovakia. Among those she helped escape were Jan Werich and Jiri Voskovec. Artur London paid her the following tribute in his book "Španělsko, Španělsko", referring to "people like Alice Glasnerova who organised a joint action with progressive compatriots in the USA and gained support for imprisoned interbrigadists, and for those who continued the struggle.."

== Political activity ==
On her return to Czechoslovakia in 1946, she worked first in the office of the Secretary General Josef Púček at the General Secretariat. From June 1948, she worked in the cabinet office of the deputy prime minister Viliam Široký as a national economist. In September 1938 she took up job as head of social law division at Czechoslovak hotels. She was one of several people who wrote supporting Noel Field’s application for a Czech residence permit and reported on his actions to the Communist Party.

== Arrest and trial ==
Following the arrest of Noel Field in May 1949 and his testimony naming her as one of his contacts, she was arrested and imprisoned for nine months. She was re-arrested in June 1951 and finally brought to trial and sentenced on 25 June 1954, on the charge of espionage. On June 10, 1955, the judgement was reversed and she was released.

== Later life ==
After her release, Glasnerová lived in Prague with her sister, Eva. She worked for N.P.Kniha in the legal department. After her retirement on grounds of ill health, she taught English to private pupils.
