= Margolius =

Margolius is a surname. Notable people with the surname include:

- Ivan Margolius (born 1947), Czech author and architect
- Rudolf Margolius (1913–1952), Czechoslovak politician

== See also ==
- Margolis
