= Under a Cruel Star =

Czech memoir covering 1941-1968

Under a Cruel Star: A Life in Prague 1941-1968
- Title page for Under a Cruel Star: A Life in Prague 1941-1968 (1986)
- Author: Heda Margolius Kovály
- Genre: Memoir
- Publication date: 1986

Under a Cruel Star: A Life in Prague 1941-1968 was published first under this title by Plunkett Lake Press, Cambridge, Massachusetts in 1986. The memoir was written by Heda Margolius Kovály and translated with Franci and Helen Epstein. It was available in a Holmes & Meier, New York 1997 edition and now distributed by Lynne Rienner Publishers, Boulder, Colorado (ISBN 0-8419-1377-3), in a Plunkett Lake Press 2010 eBook edition and in a Granta, London 2012 edition (ISBN 978-1-84708-476-7). Prague Farewell was the book title in the UK in previous editions. The memoir was originally written in Czech and published in Canada under the title Na vlastní kůži by 68 Publishers, a well-known publishing house for Czech expatriates, in Toronto in 1973. An English translation appeared in the same year as the first part of the book The Victors and the Vanquished published by Horizon Press in New York. A British edition of the book excluded the second treatise and was published by Weidenfeld and Nicolson under the title I Do Not Want To Remember in 1973. The book is also available in Chinese (ISBN 978-7-5360-6942-8), Danish (ISBN 978-87-7467-106-0), Dutch (ISBN 90-254-6826-8), French (ISBN 2-228-88397-2), German (ISBN 3-87134-035-9), Romanian (ISBN 978-606-8653-57-0), Spanish (ISBN 978-84-15625-26-1), Italian (ISBN 978-88-459-3164-2), Persian (ISBN 978-964-209-360-1) and the original Czech editions (ISBN 978-80-200-2038-3). Additional background information to the book is available in Heda Margolius Kovály and Helena Třeštíková: Hitler, Stalin and I: An Oral History, DoppelHouse Press 2018, Los Angeles, (ISBN 978-0-9987770-0-9), (ISBN 978-0-9978184-7-5).

== Summary ==
Heda Margolius Kovály (1919-2010) was born in Prague. Of Jewish ancestry, she spent the years of the Second World War in the Łódź Ghetto and then in concentration camps Auschwitz and Gross Rosen sub-camps including Christianstad. After her camp was evacuated, she escaped from a death march and made her way back to Prague, where many of her friends refused to take her in due to the Nazis' harsh punishments for those sheltering camp escapees. Kovály took part in the Prague uprising against the Nazis in May 1945. The only member of her family to survive the war was her husband, Rudolf Margolius.

Kovály's memoir describes in detail the continuing antisemitism that Jews returning from concentration camps faced. It also depicts the growing interest in communism among many Czechoslovaks, including her husband, who later became Deputy Minister of Foreign Trade. In January 1952 her husband was arrested and in November 1952, he was convicted in the Soviet-staged Slánský trial and executed on December 3, 1952. In the wake of her husband's trial, Kovály became a social pariah, barely able to survive and stay out of imprisonment as few would hire her for work, as at that time unemployment was illegal under the Czechoslovak constitution.

The book ends with the Warsaw Pact armies invasion of Czechoslovakia in August 1968 as a response to the Prague Spring. After the invasion, Kovály emigrated to the United States.

== Reception ==
In his book Cultural Amnesia: Necessary Memories from History and the Arts (2007), Clive James admired Kovály's "psychological penetration and terse style" and stated: “Given 30 seconds to recommend a single book that might start a serious student on the hard road to understanding the political tragedies of the 20th century, I would choose this one."

In their book Thinking the Twentieth Century: Intellectuals and Politics in the Twentieth Century (2012) Tony Judt and Timothy Snyder recommend Under a Cruel Star.

Writing for The New York Times, Anthony Lewis said: "Once in a while we read a book that puts the urgencies of our time and ourselves in perspective, making us confront the darker realities of human nature."

San Francisco Chronicle-Examiner called Kovály's memoir "a story of human spirit at its most indomitable … one of the outstanding autobiographies of the century."

Josef Škvorecký, a fellow Czech writer and expatriate, stated that the book was "written with the sophistication of a litterateur and the immediacy of a survivor."

== Music Interpretation ==
Jan Margolius' 'Under a Cruel Star' music interpretation, of his grandmother's, Heda Margolius Kovály's book, was judged as the best in the Composition category of the 2021 Trinity Laban Conservatoire Gold Medal Showcase.

== See also ==
- Ivan Margolius, Kovály's son, who also wrote a memoir, Reflections of Prague: Journeys through the 20th century
