= Heda Margolius Kovály =

Czech writer and translator (1919-2010)

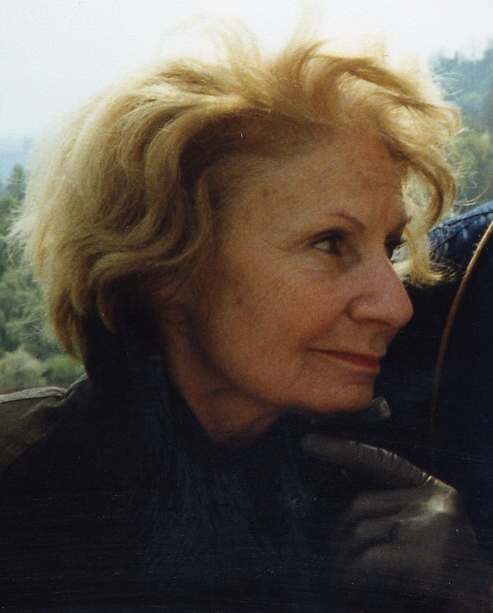
- Kovály in Prague, 1992
- Born: Heda Bloch; 15 September 1919; Prague, Czechoslovakia
- Died: 5 December 2010 (aged 91); Prague, Czech Republic
- Occupations: Writer and translator
- Spouse(s): Rudolf Margolius, Pavel Kovály
- Children: Ivan Margolius
- Writing career
- Pen name: Helena Nováková
- Genre: Memoirist
- Notable work: Under a Cruel Star

Heda Margolius Kovály (15 September 1919 – 5 December 2010) was a Czech writer and translator. As a Jewish woman during the Holocaust, she survived the Łódź Ghetto and Auschwitz where her parents were murdered. She later escaped while being marched to Bergen-Belsen. Her first husband Rudolf Margolius was the Deputy Minister for Foreign Trade in Czechoslovakia from 1949 until 1952, when he was sentenced to death as a traitor in the antisemitic Slánský show trial. She remarried to Pavel Kovály in 1955, using his name to submit her later work.

== Early life and World War II ==
Heda Margolius Kovály was born Hedvika Bloch to Jewish parents in Prague, Czechoslovakia In 1939, while Czechoslovakia was occupied by Nazi Germany, Hedvika Helena Bloch married her childhood sweetheart Rudolf Margolius.

In 1941, Heda Margolius and her husband together with her parents were rounded up along with the first 5,000 of the city's Jewish population and taken to the Łódź Ghetto in central Poland. Margolius was separated from her parents when the Jews were taken out of the Łódź Ghetto on arrival to the Auschwitz concentration camp in 1944. Margolius was chosen to work as a laborer in the Christianstadt labour camp. Margolius and her husband survived, but her parents were immediately gassed.

When the Eastern Front of the war between Germany and the Soviet Union approached the camp, its prisoners were evacuated in the first months of 1945. With a few other women, while on their journey to the Bergen-Belsen concentration camp, Margolius decided to escape back to Prague. After arriving in the city, Margolius discovered that most of the people who remained in the city during the war were too frightened by the threat of German punishment to aid an escapee from the camps. She and her husband reunited and tried to rebuild a life together in Prague. They had a son, Ivan Margolius.

== Communist party ==
When Soviet forces finally liberated Prague from Nazi control, the Communist Party began to rise. The experiences of her husband at Auschwitz and Dachau concentration camps had led him to become a member of the Communist party in 1945. After the Communist takeover of Czechoslovakia in 1948, Margolius' husband was offered a job with the Communist government of Klement Gottwald as Deputy Minister of Foreign Trade, which he was forced to accept despite his and his wife's reservations about the position. Margolius feared for her husband's safety and tried to make him leave his post, but he was arrested along with the Communist leader Rudolf Slánský and accused of "anti-state conspiracy".

== Slánský trial ==
In 1952, Margolius' husband was found guilty of conspiracy during the Slánský trial, which was a "show trial". Her husband was one of eleven Jews on the list of fourteen total people accused. They gave false confessions extracted by torture. Her husband was sentenced to death and then executed in December 1952. Margolius had been prevented from seeing her husband for eleven months after his arrest, and she later learned that he had been hanged and his body cremated and given to security officials for disposal. His ashes were thrown on an icy road.

== The trial aftermath ==
While the Communist Party remained in power, Margolius was kept from good jobs and socially shunned. She raised her son Ivan in impoverished conditions, through her determination to look after them both. She survived by translating books of well-known authors into Czech and also designing dust jackets, passing them on to publishers under pseudonyms.

Margolius protested against the Slánský trial to the Czechoslovak authorities and to the office of the Presidents of the Republic a number of times. In 1966 she smuggled out of Czechoslovakia to Pavel Tigrid in Paris the secret ruling of the Czechoslovak Supreme Court cancelling the trial and its indictments in totality, which Tigrid published as a supplement to his Svědectví magazine in 1967.

== Later life ==
Margolius remarried to Pavel Kovály (1928–2006) in 1955, using his name to submit her later work. Facing persecution in 1968 due to the Warsaw Pact invasion of Czechoslovakia, when Soviet Union troops invaded Prague after the Prague Spring, Margolius Kovály and her second husband fled Czechoslovakia to the United States.

Margolius Kovály published her autobiography Under A Cruel Star – A Life in Prague 1941–1968 in 1973. She worked as a reference assistant librarian in the Harvard Law School Library at Harvard University, in Cambridge, Massachusetts.

Margolius Kovály returned to Prague to retire with her second husband in 1996.

== Writing and media ==
Margolius Kovály's memoir was originally written in Czech and published in Canada under the title Na vlastní kůži by 68 Publishers in Toronto in 1973. An English translation appeared in the same year as the first part of the book The Victors and the Vanquished published by Horizon Press in New York. A British edition of the book excluded the second treatise and was published by Weidenfeld and Nicolson under the title I Do Not Want To Remember in 1973.

In 1986, Margolius Kovály re-published her memoir as Under A Cruel Star – A Life in Prague 1941–1968 (published in the United Kingdom as Prague Farewell). The memoir is dedicated to her son; it has been widely translated, and is available in French and English as an e-book. The memoir is also available in Chinese, Spanish, Italian, Danish, Romanian, German, Dutch, Norwegian, Japanese, Persian.

In 1985, Margolius Kovály published a novel called Nevina (Innocence) in Czech by Index, Köln and republished in the Czech Republic in 2013 by Mladá fronta, Praha. The English translation, by Alex Zucker, was published by Soho Press, New York in June 2015. Professor Marci Shore said of the book: "Although it is crime fiction and designed to be fine reading there is a deeper philosophical point which is that there is no innocence ... To participate in the resistance is to take on the guilt of retaliation and to not participate is to take on the guilt of passivity."

Between 1958 and 1989 Margolius Kovály translated from German or English into the Czech language more than 24 works of well-known authors such as Arnold Zweig, Raymond Chandler, Philip Roth, Saul Bellow, Arnold Bennett, Muriel Spark, William Golding, John Steinbeck, H. G. Wells and many others.

Jan Zábrana wrote: "Heda Kovályová was truly one of the best English translators who worked in Czechoslovakia from the late 1950s to the early 1970s. Her translations were clever, fresh, inspired, they had a smooth flow of prose, their own essence."

In 2000, Margolius Kovály participated in the making of Zuzana Justman's film A Trial in Prague. In 2015 Mladá fronta, Praha, published Hitler, Stalin a já: Ústní historie 20. století by Heda Kovályová and Helena Třeštíková based on the full transcript of the 2001 TV film documentary Hitler, Stalin a já.

Faces Of The Century series published online their view of Heda Margolius Kovály's life on July 31, 2026.

== Death ==
Margolius Kovály died in Prague, age 91, after a long illness. Heda Margolius Kovály is buried at the Margolius family tomb at New Jewish Cemetery, Izraelská 1, Prague 3, sector no. 21, row no. 13, plot no. 33, directly behind Franz Kafka's grave. The tomb also has a memorial plaque dedicated to her first husband JUDr Rudolf Margolius.

== Bibliography ==
- Kovály, Heda and Kohák, Erazim (1973). The Victors and the Vanquished. Horizon Press (New York). ISBN 0-8180-1603-5. (In Czech: Na vlastní kůži. 68 Publishers (Toronto). 1973)
- Margolius, Heda (1973). I Do Not Want To Remember Auschwitz 1941 - Prague 1968. Weidenfeld and Nicolson (London). ISBN 0-297-76671-6.
- Nováková, Helena (1985, pseudonym of Heda Margolius Kovály). Nevina. Index (Köln). In Czech.
- Margolius Kovály, Heda (1986). Under A Cruel Star – A Life in Prague 1941–1968. Plunkett Lake Press (Cambridge, Massachusetts). ISBN 0-9614696-1-7.
- Margolius Kovály, Heda (1997). Prague Farewell. Indigo (London). ISBN 0-575-40086-2. (Kindle edition on Amazon.com or Amazon.co.uk also available.)
- Margolius Kovály, Heda (1997). Under A Cruel Star – A Life in Prague 1941–1968. Holmes & Meier (New York, now distributed by Lynne Rienner Publishers, Boulder, Colorado. ISBN 0-8419-1377-3. In Czech: Na vlastní kůži. Academia (Praha). 2003, 2012.
- Margolius Kovály, Heda (2010). Under A Cruel Star – A Life in Prague 1941–1968. Plunkett Lake Press e-book (Kindle edition on Amazon.com or Amazon.co.uk)
- Margolius Kovály, Heda (2012). Under A Cruel Star - A Life in Prague 1941-1968. Granta (London). ISBN 978-1-84708-476-7.
- Kovályová, Heda (2013) Nevina aneb Vražda v Příkré ulici. Mladá fronta (Praha). ISBN 978-80-204-2592-8. In Czech.
- Margolius Kovály, Heda (2015). Innocence; or Murder on Steep Street. Soho Crime (New York). ISBN 978-1-61695-496-3.
- Kovályová, Heda a Třeštíková, Helena (2015). Hitler, Stalin a já: Ústní historie 20. století. Mladá fronta (Praha). ISBN 978-80-204-3625-2. In Czech.
- Heda Margolius Kovály and Helena Třeštíková (2018). Hitler, Stalin and I: An Oral History. DoppelHouse Press (Los Angeles). ISBN 978-0-9987770-0-9, ISBN 978-0-9978184-7-5.

== See also ==
- Cultural Amnesia (book)
- Erazim Kohák
- Helen Epstein
