= Ivry Cemetery =

Extramural cemetery of Paris

Coordinates: 48°48′45″N 02°22′03″E

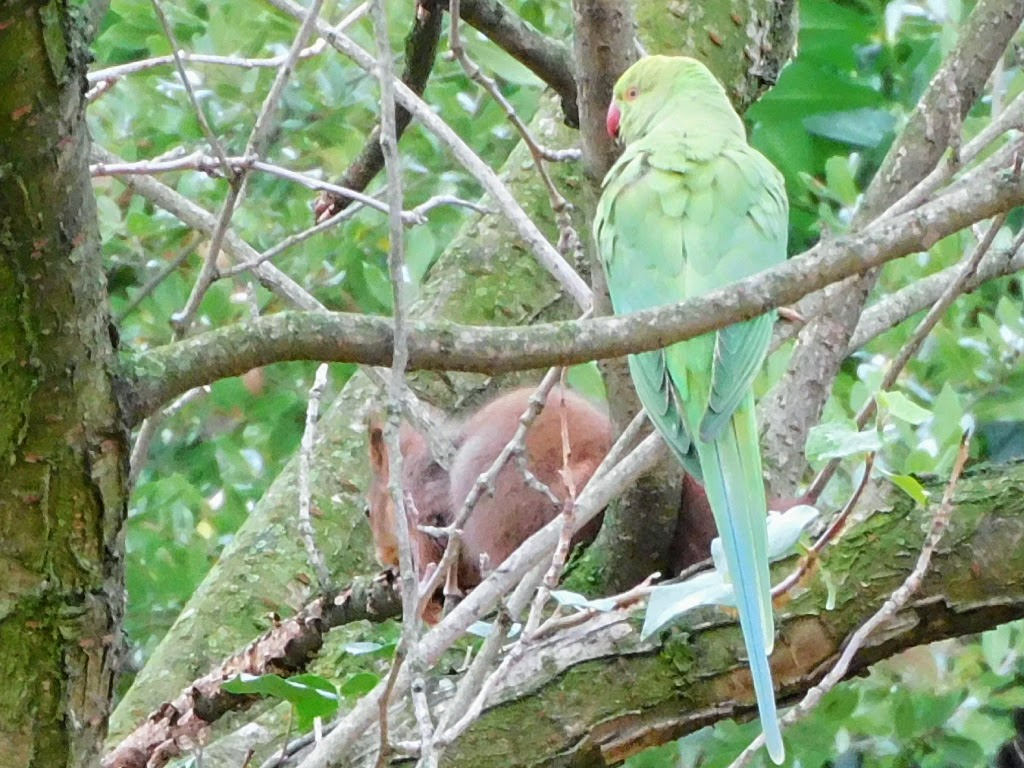
A squirrel and a parakeet at the cemetery

Ivry Cemetery (cimetière parisien d'Ivry) is one of the extramural cemeteries of Paris, located in the neighbouring town of Ivry-sur-Seine in Val-de-Marne, less than 500 metres outside Paris's intramural area. As well as a green space, it is a refuge for wild flora and fauna and bears the QualiPARIS label.

It is made up of two enclosures separated by the rue Paul-Andrieux. The north enclosure opened in 1861, covering 7.69 hectares, with a western part bought in 1897 to become the separate Kremlin-Bicêtre Cemetery. The south enclosure was set up in 1874 and covers 20.69 hectares. In total the two enclosures contain 48,000 concessions split into 47 divisions, with 240,000 burials between 1861 and 2007 and still receiving 1,000 burials a year. It has 1800 trees, making it a green space under ecological management.

Since 2015 it has been mechanically weeded, with no more chemical weedkiller used. Plants have been grown up the cemetery walls and some paths grassed over. Nesting boxes and hedgehog shelters were installed by the ville de Paris's environmental services. Tawny owls, hedgehogs, bats, foxes, hawks and woodpeckers were recorded at the cemetery late in 2016. Fruit trees were planted to feed bees and birds.

== History ==
=== Paris Commune ===
In May 1871 it was the burial site for several of those sentenced to summary execution after the fall of the Paris Commune. Estimates vary from 650 according to the fiercely anti-Commune Maxime Du Camp, 5000 according to Camille Pelletan and 15,000 according to Xavier Raspail. The third of these estimates would make it the largest Communard burial site, though only excavation would allow a more precise number to be reached.

=== Communist Resistance ===
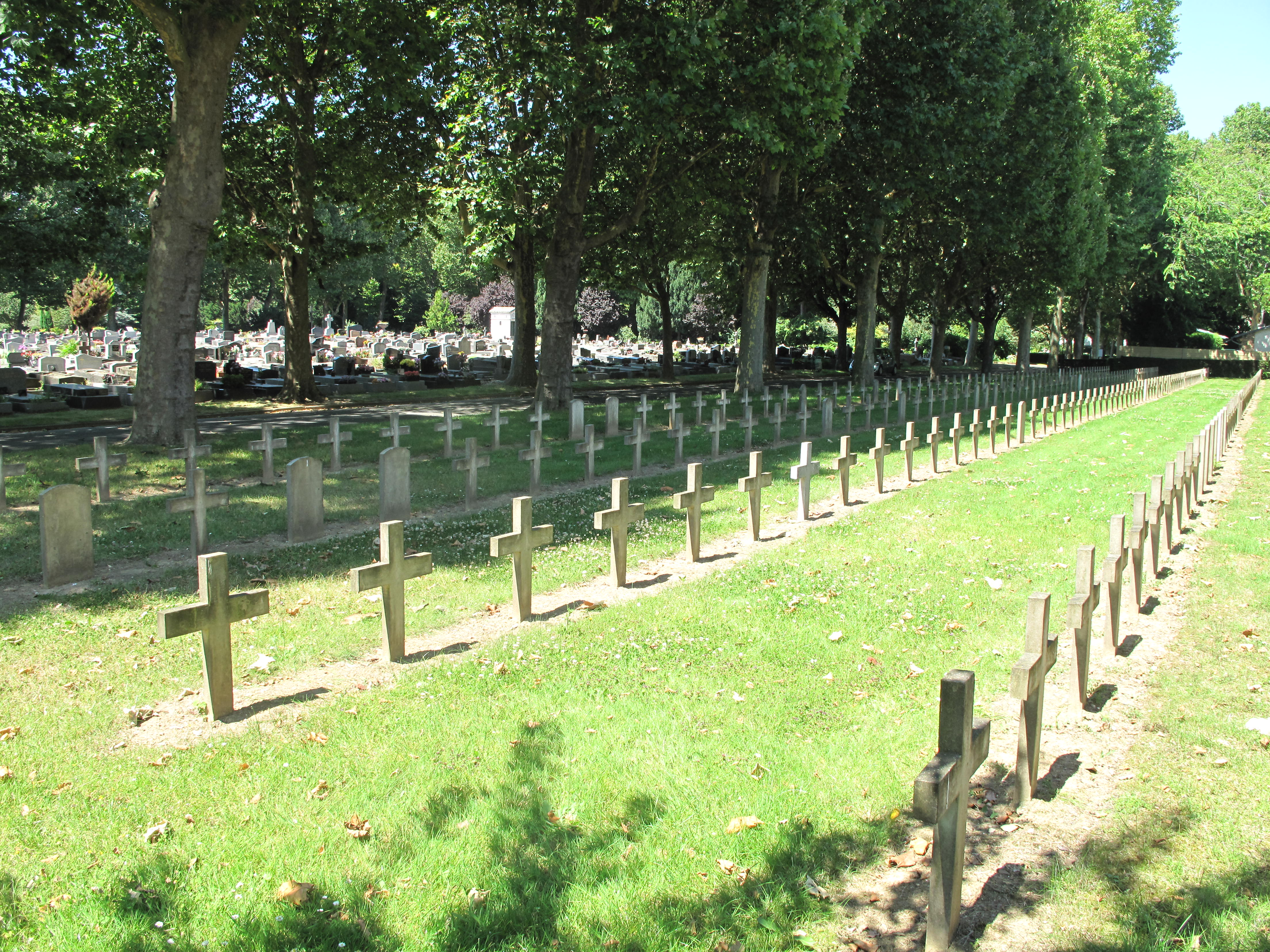
Resistance fighters' graves.

After the Second World War the Parti communiste français (PCF) acquired an important plot, known as the "carré des fusillés", in the 39th division. It was the PCF's equivalent of the Pantheon. It includes the graves of several resistance fighters executed in the clearing at the Fort Mont-Valérien, including Missak Manouchian (1906–1944), Marcel Rajman (1923–1944), Fernand Zalkinow (1923–1942) and several members of the Affiche rouge, a resistance group made up of recent immigrants to France. Also in the plot are the grave of ethnologist, linguist, resistance fighter and founder of the groupe du musée de l'Homme Boris Vildé (1908–1942) and wall plaques in memory of Olga Bancic (1912–1944), symbol of foreign female volunteers in the French Resistance, and Pierre Rebière (1909–1942). International Brigades and author of L'Aveu Artur London (1915–1986) and his wife Lise London (1916–2012), both PCF resistance fighters, are both also buried there.

=== Non-political executions ===
From 1885 to 1972 those executed at the prison de la Santé were buried in the "carré des suppliciés" division 27 of the cemetery, totalling 128 burials. They include:

- Paul Gorgulov (1895–1932), président Doumer's assassin
- Doctor Marcel Petiot (1897–1946)
- Émile Buisson (1902–1956)
- Claude Buffet (1936–1972)

They were all buried in unmarked graves. At the end of the 1990s all the remains were removed on government orders and either placed in an ossuary or returned to their families and reburied elsewhere. Today only the paving stones marking the plot's boundaries survive.

== Other notable burials ==
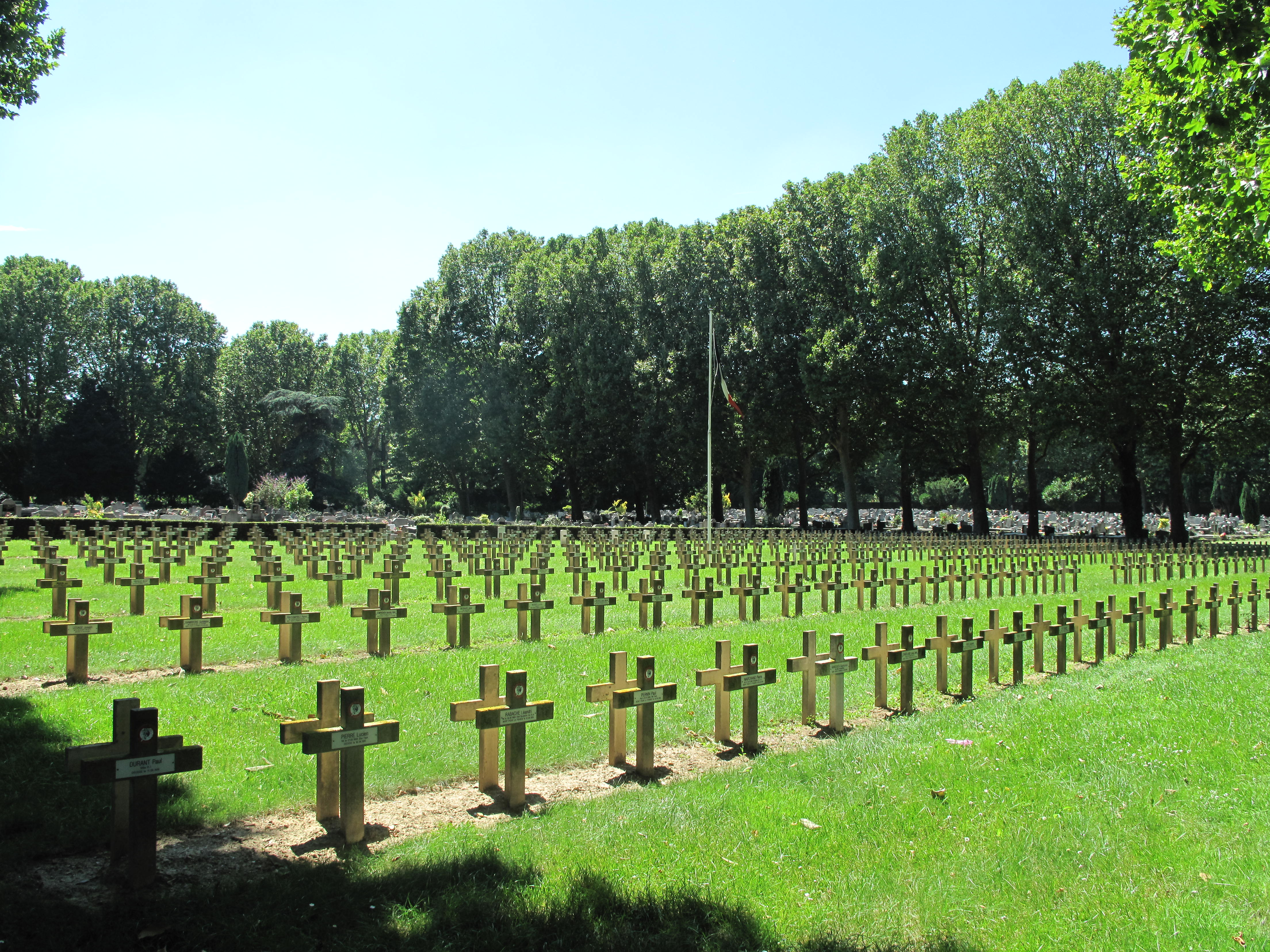
First World War graves at the cemetery

- Arthur Adamov (1908–1970), writer and playwright (44th division)
- Louis Caput (1921–1985), cyclist (44th division)
- André Chastel (1912–1990), art historian, professor at the Collège de France (9th division)
- Marius Constant (1925–2004), composer (24th division)
- René Dagron (1819–1900), photographic pioneer (10th division)
- Pierre Daix (1922–2014), resistance fighter and journalist (44th division)
- Louis Delapchier (1878–1959), sculptor and illustrator (13th division)
- Nicolas Eekman (1889–1973), Dutch painter (21st division)
- Fernand Faniard (1894–1955), lyric artist (32nd division)
- Yves Giraud-Cabantous (1904–1973), driver (21st division)
- Natalia Gontcharova (1881–1962), Russian painter, wife of Michel Larionov (7th division)
- Michel Larionov (1881–1964), Russian painter, husband of Natalia Gontcharova (7th division)
- Éliphas Lévi (1810–1875; later disinterred and thrown in a common grave in 1881), ecclesiastic and occultist
- Lazare Ponticelli (1897–2008), last surviving World War One poilu (41st division)
- Pierre Prins (1838–1913), painter (29th division)
- Eugène Rubens-Alcais (1884–1963), French deaf activist in sport (5th division)
- Louis Seigner (1903–1991), actor (7th division)
- Roger Stéphane (1919–1994), writer and journalist (7th division)

The cemetery contains Commonwealth war graves of 4 British Army soldiers of World War I whose graves are in the 42nd division.
