= Josef Urválek =

Czech judge and prosecutor

Urválek during the show-trial of Rudolf Slánský

Josef Urválek (28 April 1910, České Budějovice – 29 November 1979, Prague) was a Czech judge and prosecutor. He was the procurator and later judge of the Czechoslovak State Court. Urválek is known for his participation in the political processes in socialist Czechoslovakia during the 1950s. In a number of show trials, most notably during the Slánský trial, he was responsible for securing the death sentences of Milada Horáková and of 14 communist functionaries, including Rudolf Slánský, on trumped-up charges of treason.

When cross-examining the accused, Urválek would frequently interrupt them and compare the accused to insects and human waste. At Slánský's trial, Urválek said in his final speech "I demand the death sentence for all accused. Let justice smash like an iron fist, without the slightest pity. Let it be the fire that shall burn out this nest of enemies."

After the trials Urválek rose within the party ranks, being made leader of the highest court in 1957. He retired from this post in 1963 to join the Výzkumný ústav kriminalistiky ("Research Institute of Criminalistics") in the general prosecution. Urválek wrote an article "Některé poznatky z výzkumu ochranného dohledu v souvislosti s prokurátorským dozorem" ("Some findings from protective supervision research in the context of prosecution") together with future Czech politician Helena Válková. He died in 1979.
