= Kurt Epstein =

Czech water polo player (1904–1975)

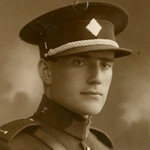
- Born: 29 January 1904; Roudnice nad Labem, Bohemia, Austria-Hungary
- Died: 1 February 1975 (aged 71)
- Citizenship: Czechoslovakia, United States
- Occupation: Water polo player
- Known for: Played water polo in two Olympics; Incarcerated in Nazi concentration camps
- Height: 6 ft 1 in (185 cm)
- Children: Helen Epstein, Tom Epstein, David Epstein

Kurt Epstein (29 January 1904 – 1 February 1975) was a Czech water polo player and survivor of Nazi concentration camps. He represented Czechoslovakia at two Summer Olympic Games, but after 1948, he emigrated to the United States.

== Early life ==
Kurt Epstein was born on 29 January 1904 in Roudnice nad Labem in Bohemia, Austria-Hungary, to Maximilian and Helena Epstein. Their family was of Jewish-German ethnicity. He grew up in Roudnice nad Labem on the bank of the Elbe River. He lived in a house built by his father in 1900, on the site on which his grandfather built the first ever house owned by a Jew outside the Jewish quarter of Prague in 1830. While in high school, he became a competitive rower and swimmer, and also a swimming coach.

In 1924, he joined the Czechoslovak Army, was picked for reserve officers school, and became a second lieutenant. The Czechoslovak National Swim Club asked that he be granted leave of absence to compete for them.

== Water polo career ==
Epstein represented Czechoslovakia in water polo at the 1928 Summer Olympics and the 1936 Summer Olympics. His team finished tied in ninth position in both Olympics.

== Incarceration in Nazi concentration camps ==
After the German occupation of Czechoslovakia in 1938, Epstein was incarcerated at various Nazi concentration camps, including Theresienstadt concentration camp, Auschwitz concentration camp, and a labour camp at Frýdlant. The remaining members of his family were gassed by the Nazis.

== Later life ==
He returned to Prague after World War II, and was elected a member of the Czechoslovak Olympic Committee. After the Communists took over in 1948, he emigrated to the United States.

He married Franci Rabinek Solar, a dress designer who had herself been interned at Theresienstadt concentration camp, then Auschwitz concentration camp, and finally Bergen-Belsen concentration camp from which the British had liberated her. She was also the only survivor in her family. They had a daughter, Helen Epstein, who became a writer and an associate professor of journalism at New York University, and two sons.

In New York City during 1948, the New York Athletic Club permitted Kurt to observe one of their water polo matches, but clarified that as they did not accept Jews as members, he would not be hired as a coach. After a decade of being unable to find steady employment, he ultimately became a cutter in a clothing factory of Star Children's Wear in the Garment District.

== See also ==
- List of select Jewish water polo players
