= Rudolf Margolius =

Czech lawyer and economist

JUDr Rudolf Margolius
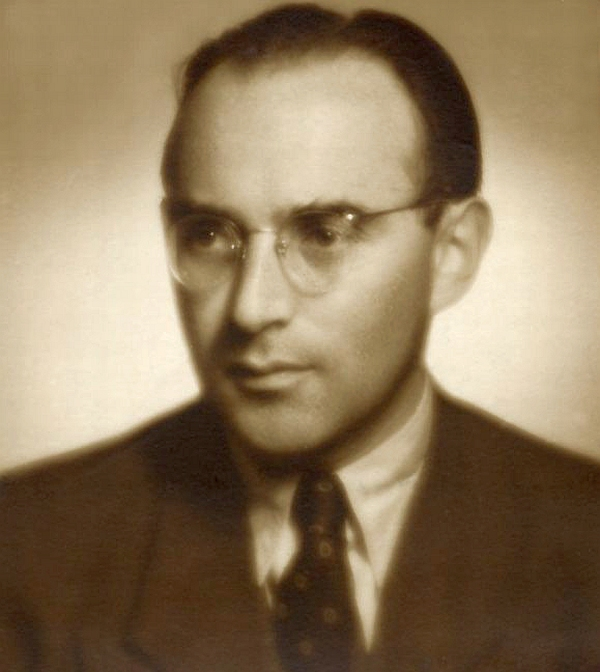
- Margolius in 1950

Deputy Minister for Foreign Trade
- In office April 1949 – January 1952

Personal details
- Born: 31 August 1913 Prague, Austria-Hungary
- Died: 3 December 1952 (aged 39) Prague, Czechoslovakia
- Party: Czechoslovak Communist Party
- Spouse: Heda Margolius Kovály
- Children: Ivan Margolius
- Awards: Order of the Republic
- Website: www.margolius.co.uk

Rudolf Margolius (31 August 1913 – 3 December 1952) was a Czech lawyer and economist, deputy minister for foreign trade in Czechoslovakia (1949–1952), and a co-defendant in the Slánský trial in November 1952.

Imprisoned by the Nazis in the Łódź Ghetto and several concentration camps, he survived the Holocaust and joined the Czechoslovak Communist Party, working as an economist. The 1952 show trial involved the Communist Party General Secretary, Rudolf Slánský, and his thirteen co-defendants. They were arrested, unjustly accused, tried, and executed as traitors and western spies. The trial was orchestrated by Soviet advisors, sent to Prague by Soviet premier Joseph Stalin, and assisted by Czechoslovak Secret Service interrogators and the members of Czechoslovak Communist Party Central Committee. The destruction of the Czechoslovak Communist high-ranking party officials by their own colleagues has defied attempts to rationalize it, and our understanding of the affair remains superficial. One of the people who were thrown into the alleged conspiracy was Dr Rudolf Margolius.

The Slánský group consisted of many personalities. On one side was Slánský, an extremist and one of those who helped to usher Czechoslovakia into the Stalinist era. At the centre stood Vladimír Clementis (minister of foreign affairs), a Communist and one of the conductors of the February 1948 communist coup, but also a man who had dared to criticize the Molotov–Ribbentrop Pact. On the other extreme of the scale was Margolius. Unlike others in the Slánský group, he joined the Communist Party late – in December 1945 – and acquired faith in socialism as a result of his experience in Nazi concentration camps. Margolius never held any party appointments; he was purely an economist.

== Life ==
Rudolf Margolius was born to a Jewish family in Prague, in a patriotic Czech, middle-class milieu. As a law student in the thirties at Charles University, studying together with the Czech poet Hanuš Bonn, he devoted much of his time to the YMCA travelling in Western Europe, Middle East and America. During Czechoslovakia's Munich crisis with Nazi Germany he was an Army reservist serving together with his friend, music composer, Jan Hanuš.

In 1939, while Czechoslovakia was already occupied by the Third Reich, Margolius married his childhood sweetheart, Heda Bloch (later known as Heda Margolius Kovály). In 1941, they were deported to the Łódź Ghetto and subsequently to concentration camps in Auschwitz and Dachau. In May 1945, after escaping from Dachau, Margolius was made a leader of the Garmisch-Partenkirchen camp for the war refugees. After returning to Prague in June 1945, together with Jarmila Čapková, he went to Bergen-Belsen to search for Josef Čapek.

In December 1945, Margolius joined the Czechoslovak Communist Party influenced by his war experiences and murder of his parents and relatives in the concentration camps and hope of instituting better future for the country. Between 1945 and 1948 he worked for the Central Federation of Czechoslovak Industry in Prague. Afterwards he was promoted to the Chief of Staff of the Minister for Foreign Trade (1948–49) and subsequently became Deputy Minister for Foreign Trade responsible for the sector trading with Western countries (1949–52). Together with his colleague, Evžen Löbl, Margolius was the author of dollar offensive in the Czechoslovak economic policy. In 1949 in London Margolius negotiated and signed several important economic and financial agreements with Ernest Bevin and Sir William Strang who represented the British Government. The agreements through Margolius' effort were weighted in favour of the Czechoslovak trade rather than the British trade. Czechoslovak government was satisfied with the outcome of the negotiations and requested that the effort of all those who had participated would be appreciated. Margolius was a lawyer and economist and was not directly involved in the contemporary Communist Party machinations or politics. Having realised the Party corruption and suppression of freedom he resigned his position in May 1951, but his resignation was not accepted, he was ordered to continue in his post.

Rudolf Margolius was arrested on 10 January 1952. After months of physical and psychological coercion in addition to being forced to sign a false confession, Margolius met for the first time his alleged conspirators led by Rudolf Slánský at the Czechoslovak High Court attached to the Pankrác Prison in Prague in November 1952. Margolius was chosen as a member of the ‘conspiracy’ because in his capacity as Deputy Minister at the Ministry of Foreign Trade he made trade agreements with capitalist countries against the wishes of the Soviet Union to increase trade with other socialist countries and he dealt with large sums of money. These details had a great impact on contemporary public opinion. As had been determined in advance in Moscow and by the Czechoslovak Communist Party's Central Committee, the court sentenced Margolius and ten others to death, three received life sentences. The Times on 28 November 1952 commented: "The only surprising aspect...is that Margolius...is not among those who have been given the reduced penalty." On 3 December 1952, at the execution, Margolius did not pronounce any last words.

Pavel Tigrid wrote: "Margolius… survived the Nazi concentration camps and after the war enrolled into the Communist Party from the real conviction: that never again would be repeated what had happened in the past, that no one would be persecuted for his or hers racial, national or social origins, in order for all people to be equal, in order to establish an era of real freedom. A couple of years later the comrades succeeded in what the Nazis had not managed: they killed him."

== Posthumous exoneration ==
The Scotsman reported on 16 May 1968:

Czechoslovak President Ludvík Svoboda has awarded the Order of the Republic posthumously to Rudolf Margolius, former Deputy Foreign Trade Minister executed in 1952 after the Stalinist Slánský trial. Margolius was accused of being a member of the “anti-party conspiratorial centre,” and was sentenced to death along with former Party Secretary Rudolf Slánský and nine others on November 27, 1952. Slánský and the others were judicially rehabilitated by the Supreme Court in 1963. All had been accused of high treason, espionage and sabotage and organizing a Jewish plot to bring down the régime.

A memorial plaque dedicated to Rudolf Margolius is located on the family tomb at New Jewish Cemetery, Izraelská 1, Prague 3, sector no. 21, row no. 13, plot no. 33, directly behind Franz Kafka’s grave.

== Film documentary and media ==
A Trial in Prague, a 83 min U.S./Czech documentary film by Zuzana Justman about the Slánský trial was released in 2000. It includes archival material about Rudolf Margolius and an interview with his wife Heda Margolius Kovály. Other interviewees include Lise London, whose late husband Artur London was one of the defendants and wrote about the trial in a widely published memoir The Confession; Jan Kavan, the former Czech Minister of Foreign Affairs, whose father Pavel Kavan was also a trial defendant; and Marian Šlingová-Fagan who was the widow of defendant Otto Šling.

Le Procès - Prague 1952, a 1hr 10min French documentary film by Ruth Zylberman for ARTE France & Pernel Media, had its world premiere at FIPADOC International Documentary Festival, Biarritz, France on January 18, 2022. The new documentary made from the Slánský trial film and audio archives found by chance in 2018 in a warehouse in the suburb of Prague served as a starting point for the film. The director tells the trial through the descendants of three of the condemned: the daughter and grandson of Rudolf Slánský, the son and granddaughter of Rudolf Margolius, and the three children of Artur London, sentenced to life imprisonment. Slánský and Margolius were both executed after the trial.

Historian David Hertl emphasised that Margolius held no roles in the government or in the Communist Party in the programme called The Youngest Hanged in the Trial with the Slánský Group was Rudolf Margolius. But Why Him, is a Mystery to Historians. (Nejmladším oběšeným v procesu se skupinou Slánského byl Rudolf Margolius. Proč zrovna on, je ale pro historiky záhadou.) held in Czech on the Czech Radio Plus, December 1, 2022.

Medium.Seznam.cz published an article on December 1st, 2023 stating: "... On the other hand, there were personalities like Rudolf Margolius, who was a pure technocrat, and about whom one can say with a clear conscience that he was completely innocent."

Petr Mallota et al in the book Popravení z politických důvodů v komunistickém Československu (Persons executed for political reasons in Communist Czechoslovakia) published in November 2024, confirmed Margolius' party non-activity as follows: "... He never became an active communist functionary, he was too occupied with professional economical tasks. His colleagues assessed him as a very capable, terribly self-sacrificing person, and a hard worker. However, politically, according to them, he was not involved, in fact, he was not even interested in political activity."

On March 3, 2025, Robert Břešťan wrote an article entitled 'The Case of an Executed Man. And the Fight for an Apology from Gottwald, Havel to Pavel' (Případ popraveného muže. A boj o omluvu u Gottwalda, Havla až k Pavlovi) published on the website hlidacipes.org, where he describes Ivan Margolius's efforts to obtain an apology for the murder of his father.

Cold War History series published online their view of Rudolf Margolius' case on February 4, 2026.

Faces Of The Century series published online their view of Rudolf Margolius' case on July 29, 2026.

A collection of Rudolf Margolius' final letters, Rudolf Margolius: Poslední dopisy, was published in Czech by Argo spol., Prague in October 2026.

== See also ==
- Heda Margolius Kovály
- Ivan Margolius
- Under a Cruel Star (book)
- Artur London
- Milada Horáková
- Jan Hanuš
- Slánský trial
- Josef Čapek
- List of Czech and Slovak Jews
