= Bedřich Geminder =

Czech politician

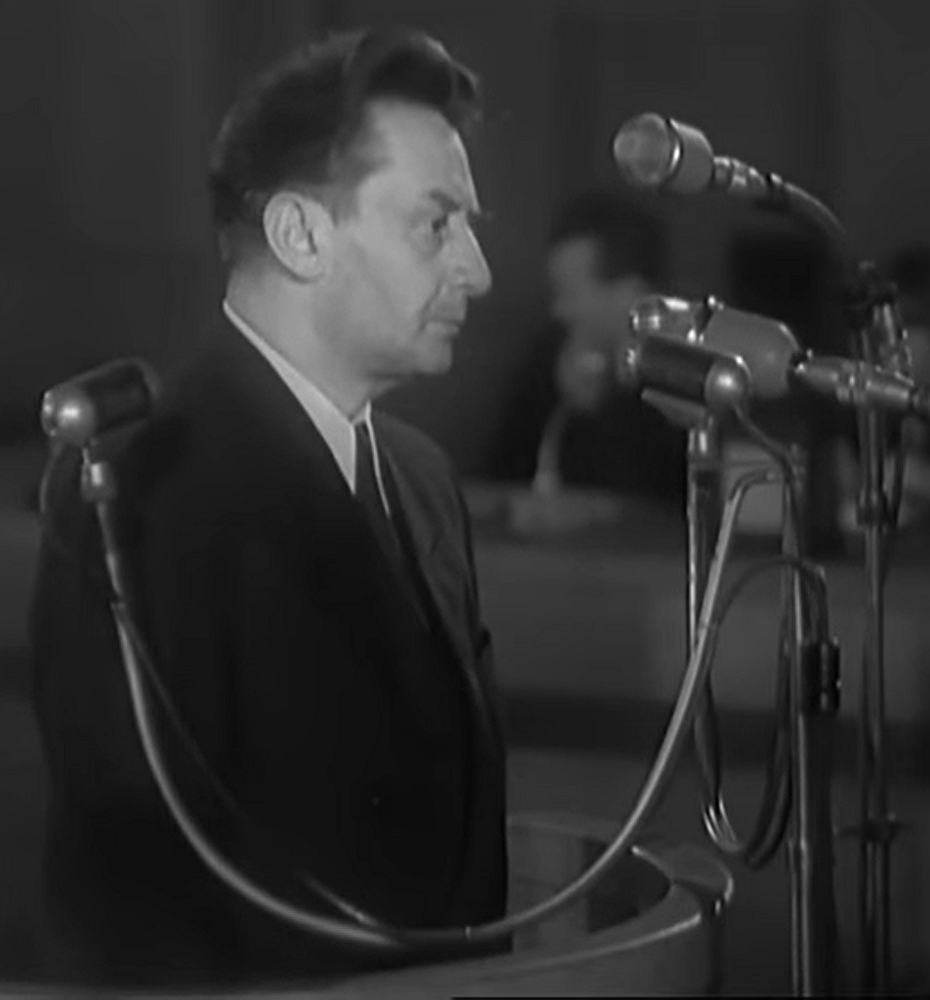
- Geminder during the Slánský trial
- Born: Friedrich Geminder; 19 November 1901; Witkowitz, Margraviate of Moravia, Austria-Hungary
- Died: 3 December 1952 (aged 51); Pankrác Prison, Prague, Czechoslovak Republic
- Political party: Communist Party of Czechoslovakia
- Awards: Order of Lenin; Medal "For the Victory over Germany in the Great Patriotic War 1941–1945"

Bedřich Geminder (born Friedrich Geminder; 19 November 1901 – 3 December 1952) was a Czechoslovak politician and journalist.

== Biography ==
Geminder was born into a German-speaking Jewish middle class family in Vítkovice, Ostrava. He attended German-language schools: first a gymnasium in Ostrava, and then technical schools in Děčín and Berlin. Geminder approached the Jewish youth movement after World War I, where he was exposed to socialist ideas In 1919 he joined the Free Socialist Youth (FSJ) in Berlin, and was involved in illegal organizational activities in Germany and Austria; he was arrested in Berlin in 1920, and again in Vienna in 1921, after which he was expelled to Czechoslovakia. Geminder joined the Communist Party of Czechoslovakia (KSČ) in the same year, and would serve as a regional secretary of the Young Communist League of Czechoslovakia until 1925.

Between 1926 and 1930 he lived in Moscow, where he worked as a member of the Executive Committee of the Young Communist International; from 1928 he was also an alternate member of the Executive Committee of the Secretariat of the Communist International (Comintern). Geminder returned to Czechoslovakia in May 1930, to work as a propaganda secretary of the KSČ, and as editor of several of the party's newspapers. In these roles, he worked closely with Klement Gottwald.

Geminder did not hold Czechoslovak citizenship during the interwar period; his application for neutralization had been rejected by a commission in 1921, which considered him a Jew of German nationality. He was arrested in Ústí nad Labem in 1930, but escaped and continued to live clandestinely in Czechoslovakia. After a second arrest in 1935, Geminder was deported to the Soviet Union after spending one month in prison. There, he obtained Soviet citizenship and worked in several high positions within the Press and Radio Broadcasting Department of the Comintern, becoming its head in November 1939. After the German invasion of the Soviet Union in 1941, he was in charge of propaganda aimed at the fascist powers and German-occupied countries in Europe, including radio broadcasts and bulletins. After the dissolution of the Comintern, Geminder became head of the press department of the Communist Party of the Soviet Union in November 1943. He held this position until July 1946, when he returned to Czechoslovakia.

After his return Geminder became head of the international department of the KSČ, being responsible for propaganda abroad and for maintaining contacts with international communist parties. In this role, Geminder provided financial assistance to the French Communist Party, to refugees in the aftermath of the Greek Civil War, and to the anti-Titoist opposition in Yugoslavia.

Geminder had a close personal relationship with Rudolf Slánský; the two had worked closely together while in Soviet exile during the war, and Geminder had at one point even lived with the Slánskýs. He was arrested together with Slánský on 24 November 1951, and charged with high treason. He was found guilty in the so-called Slánský trial in November 1952, and executed at Pankrác Prison in Prague on 3 December.
