= Memorial to the Victims of Communism =

Memorial in Prague, Czech Republic

- Pomník obětem komunismu
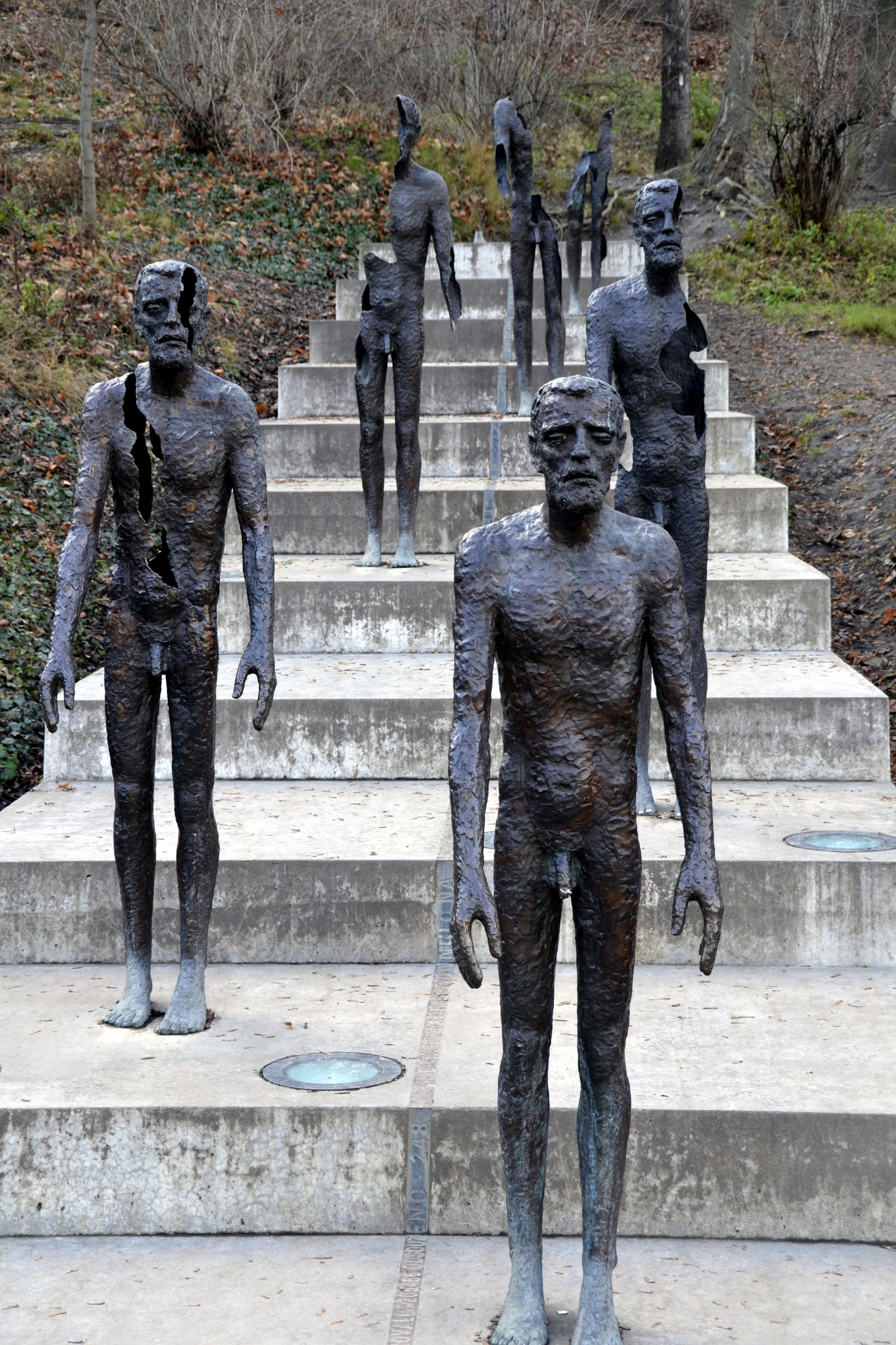
- Memorial to the Victims of Communism
- Interactive map of Memorial to the Victims of Communism
- Location: Prague
- Coordinates: 50°04′52″N 14°24′15″E
- Designer: Olbram Zoubek
- Type: Memorial
- Opening date: 22 May 2002
- Dedicated to: Victims of the communist era

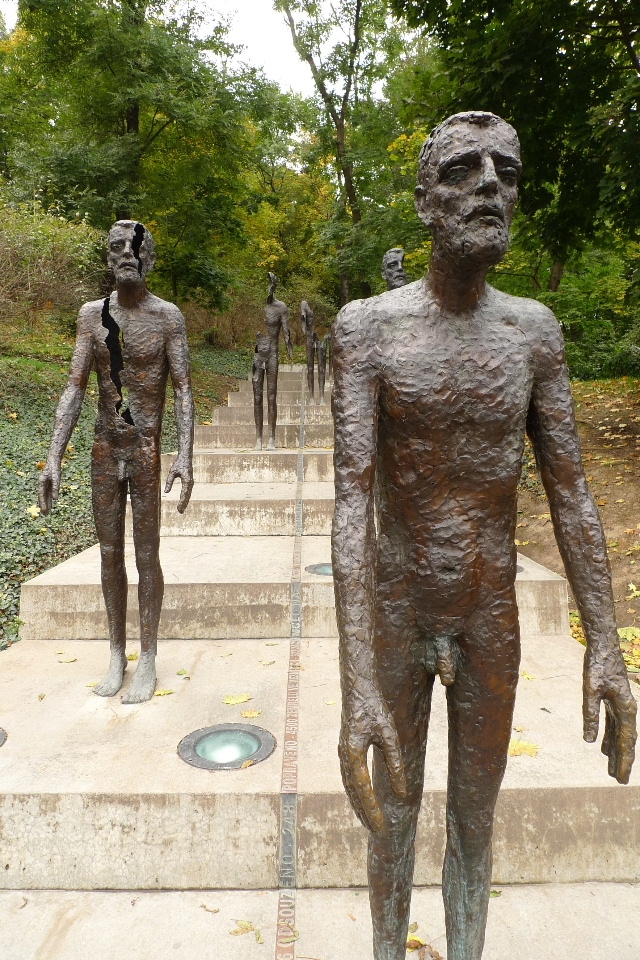

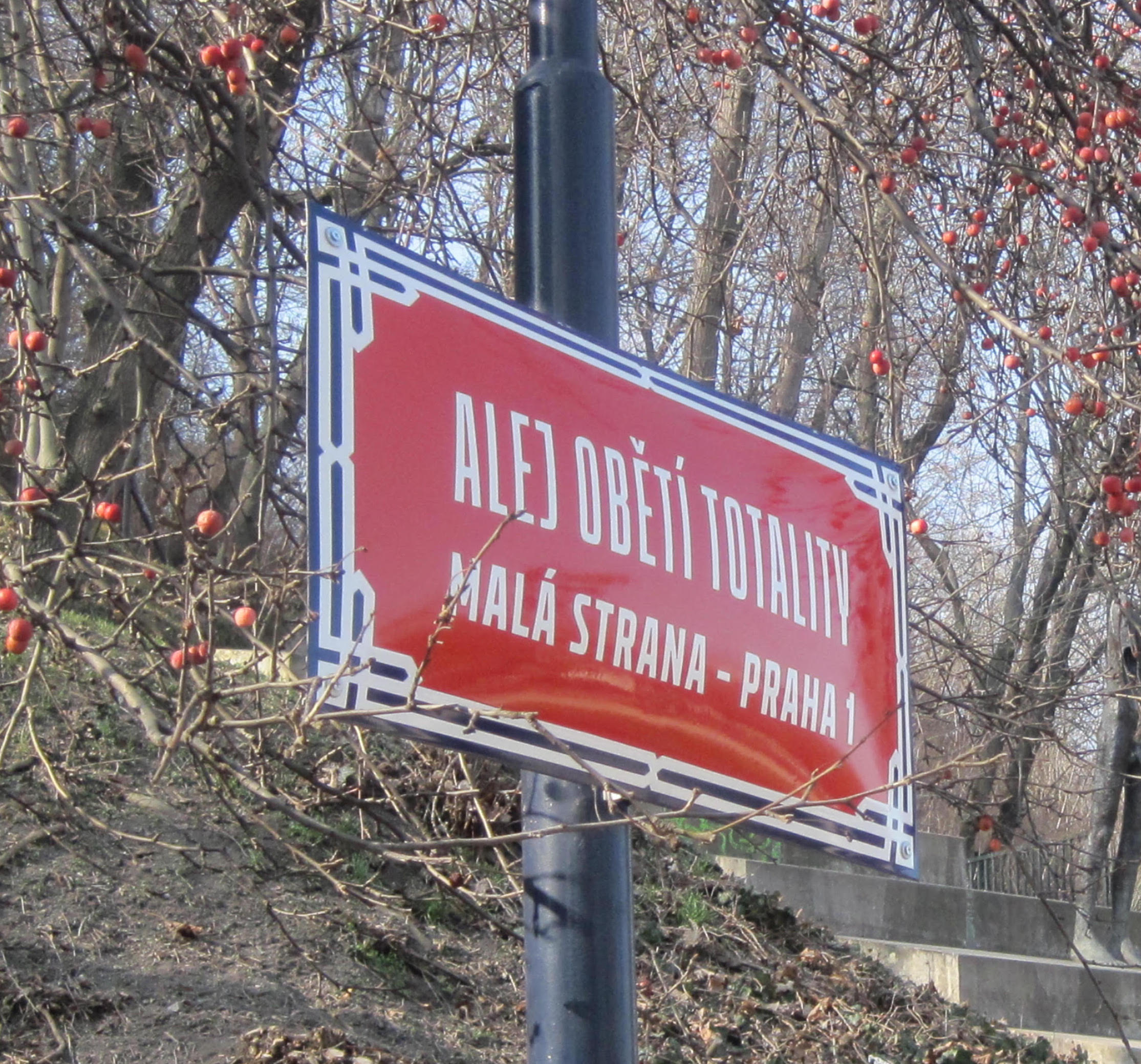
Alleyway of Victims of Totalitarianism, Malá Strana Prague 1

The Memorial to the Victims of Communism (Czech: Pomník obětem komunismu) is a series of statues in Prague commemorating the victims of the communist regime in Czechoslovakia between 1948 and 1989. It is located at the base of Petřín hill, Újezd street in the Malá Strana or the Lesser Town area.

It was unveiled on the 22 May 2002, twelve years after the fall of communism in the Eastern Bloc, and is the work of Czech sculptor Olbram Zoubek and architects Jan Kerel and Zdeněk Holzel. It was supported by the local council and Confederation of Political Prisoners (KPV).

== Description ==
The memorial shows six bronze statues depicting a single individual standing on a flight of stairs. Each statue is in a different state of decay representing the different stages of the individual's destruction. This symbolizes the treatment of political prisoners by the Communist government. The individual's continual defiance is represented by the fact that all of the statues, regardless of the level of decay, remain standing.

There is also a bronze strip that runs along the centre of the memorial, showing the estimated numbers of individuals that faced state repression during the communist era:

- 205,486 arrested
- 170,938 forced into exile
- 4,500 died in prison
- 327 shot trying to escape
- 248 executed

A bronze plaque nearby reads:

"The memorial to the victims of communism is dedicated to all victims not only those who were jailed or executed but also those whose lives were ruined by totalitarian despotism."

On February 24, 2018, the adjacent pedestrian way to the memorial was named "Alej obětí totality" as suggested to the Prague City Council by Ivan Margolius.

== Controversy ==
Prior to the memorial being unveiled, there were reports in the local media about an apparent political row over who should attend the unveiling ceremony. Then-President Václav Havel, despite having been a leading dissident in the communist era, was not an original invitee and only received an invitation two days before the ceremony. Havel ended up visiting the monument with its sculptor Zoubek the day prior to its unveiling.

The memorial has not been universally welcomed, with some artists saying the memorial is kitsch and others critical that female figures were not included.

One of the statues was damaged during two bomb blasts in 2003. The perpetrator was 63-year-old pensioner Vladimír Štěpánek, who had conducted numerous bombing attacks targeting railways, public infrastructure, and other monuments.
