= Ivan Margolius =

Czech architect and writer

- Born: 27 February 1947 (age 79); Prague, Czechoslovakia
- Citizenship: British
- Education: Czech Technical University, The Polytechnic
- Occupations: Architect, author, automotive historian
- Writing career
- Language: Czech, English
- Notable awards: Honorary Silver Medal of Jan Masaryk, Miroslav Ivanov Prize for Non-fiction Literature
- Website: www.margolius.co.uk

Ivan Margolius (born 27 February 1947) is an author, architect and propagator of Czech culture and technology.

== Life ==
Margolius was born in Prague, son of JUDr Rudolf Margolius, Deputy Minister for Foreign Trade, and Heda Margolius Kovály, Czech writer and translator, both parents being Holocaust survivors. He attended primary and secondary schools there and started to study architecture at the Czech Technical University in Prague. Margolius left Czechoslovakia in 1966 because of political persecution of his family. He settled in the United Kingdom where he became a naturalized citizen in 1973 and where he completed his architectural studies at the Polytechnic of Central London. He practised architecture at Yorke Rosenberg Mardall, Foster and Partners, Koetter Kim and Associates and Skidmore, Owings and Merrill. Margolius co-operated extensively with Jan Kaplický founder of Future Systems. Margolius is an author of numerous articles and books on art, architecture, automobiles, design and history. Since April 2021 he is a regular contributor to the classic car magazine The Automobile.

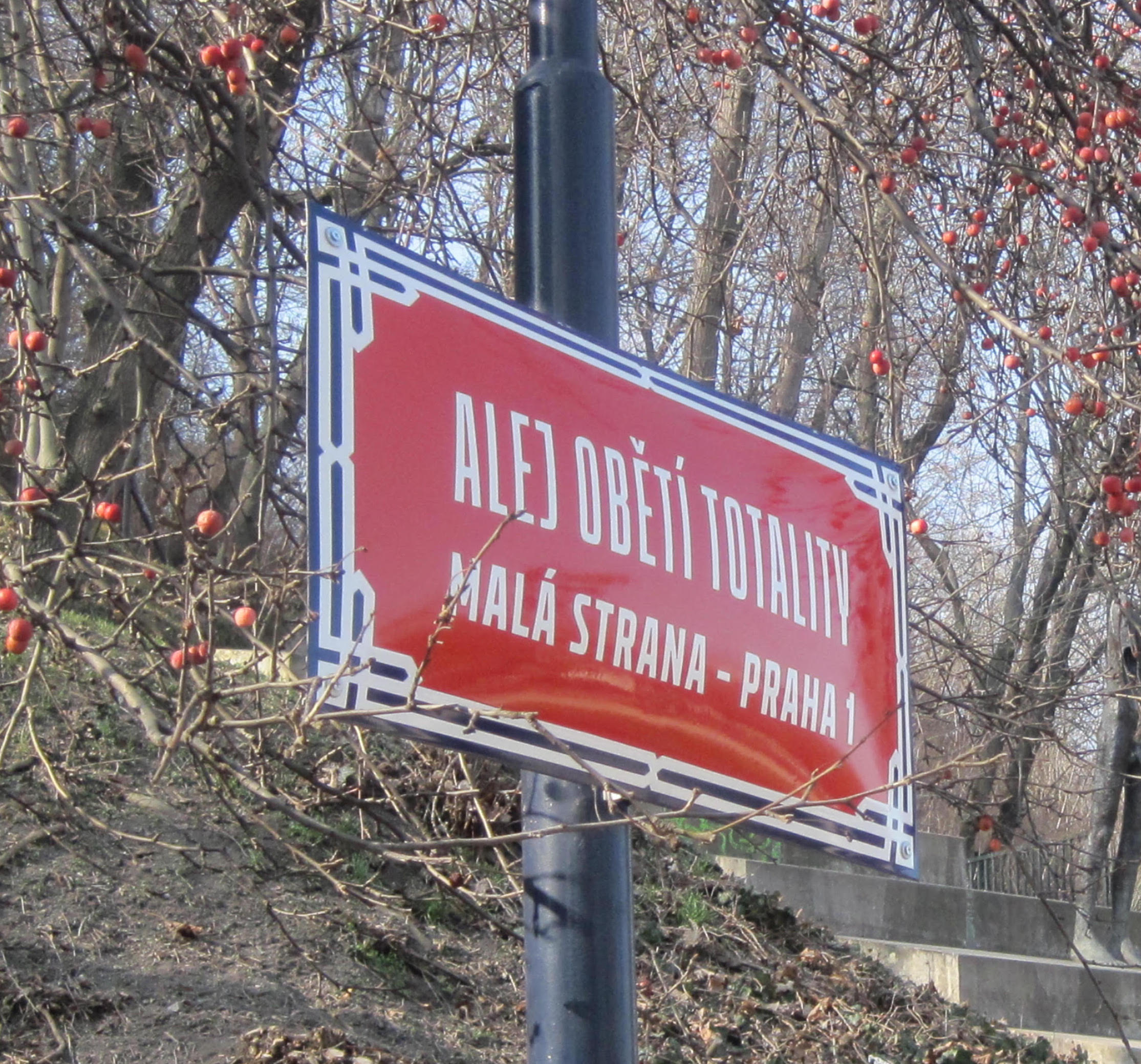
Alleyway of Victims of Totalitarianism, Malá Strana Prague 1

In 2016 Margolius suggested to the Prague Council for a street to be named ‘Obětí totality’ (Víctims of totalitarianism) which was realised in February 2018 by naming in such a way the alley adjacent to the Memorial to the Victims of Communism at Újezd, Malá Strana.

== Published works ==
- Cubism in Architecture and the Applied Arts, David & Charles, Newton Abbot & North Vermont 1979, ISBN 0-7153-7673-X.
- Tatra – The Legacy of Hans Ledwinka, SAF Publishing, Harrow 1990, ISBN 0-946719-06-3 (written with John G Henry) Cugnot Book Award of Distinction 1991.
- Škoda Laurin & Klement, Osprey Automotive, London 1992, ISBN 1-85532-237-4 (written with Charles Meisl) Cugnot Book Award of Distinction 1993.
- Prague – a guide to 20th century architecture, Ellipsis, London 1996, ISBN 1-899858-18-0.
- Church of the Sacred Heart, Jože Plečnik, 1922-33, Architecture in Detail, Phaidon Press, London 1995, ISBN 0-7148-3351-7.
- Automobiles by Architects, Wiley-Academy, London 2000, ISBN 0-471-60786-X.
- Architects + Engineers = Structures, Wiley-Academy, London 2002, ISBN 0-471-49825-4.
- Future Systems, Zlatý řez, Prague 2002, ISBN 80-901562-6-6, (written with Jan Kaplický, Michaela Kadnerová and Jana Tichá).
- ‘Art + Architecture’, Architectural Design, no. 163, vol. 73, no. 3, guest editor, May/June 2003, ISBN 0-470-84773-5.
- Czech Inspiration – Česká inspirace, Fraktaly, Praha 2005, ISBN 80-86627-09-8, (written with Jan Kaplický).
- Reflections of Prague: Journeys through the 20th century, John Wiley & Sons, Chichester 2006, ISBN 0-470-02219-1.
- Praha za zrcadlem: Putování 20. stoletím, Argo, Praha 2007, ISBN 978-80-7203-947-0.
- Jan Kaplický Drawings, Circa Press, London 2015, ISBN 978-0-9930721-0-9 (written with Richard Rogers) International Deutsches Architekturmuseum Architectural Book Award, 2015.
- Tatra – The Legacy of Hans Ledwinka, new edition, Veloce Publishing, Dorchester 2015, ISBN 978-1-845847-99-9, (written with John G. Henry, foreword by Norman Foster and prologue by Erich Ledwinka).
- Heda Margolius Kovály and Helena Třeštíková, Hitler, Stalin and I: An Oral History, DoppelHouse Press, Los Angeles 2018 ISBN 978-0-9987770-0-9, ISBN 978-0-9978184-7-5, prepared for publication and translated by Ivan Margolius.
- Tatra – Odkaz Hanse Ledwinky, Argo, Praha 2020, ISBN 978-80-257-3066-9, (Czech edition, written with John G. Henry, foreword by Norman Foster, and prologue by Erich Ledwinka)
- Jan Kaplický – Pro budoucnost a pro krásu, CPress, Brno 2020, ISBN 978-80-264-3350-7. Miroslav Ivanov Prize for Non-fiction Literature 2021.
- Jan Kaplický - For the Future and For Beauty, Edition Axel Menges, Stuttgart 2022, ISBN 978-3-86905-025-6.
- Riflessi di Praga, Poldi Libri, Granze 2023, ISBN 978-88-940346-3-9.
- Škoda Laurin & Klement 1856-1991 - značka osvědčená v celém světě, Argo, Praha 2024, ISBN 978-80-257-4259-4, (written with Charles Meisl).
- Rudolf Margolius, Poslední dopisy (Final Letters), Argo, Praha 2026, ISBN 978-80-257-4999-9 (in Czech, for publication prepared and postscript written by Ivan Margolius).

== Awards ==
- 1991 Cugnot Book Award of Distinction, Society of Automotive Historians.
- 1993 Cugnot Book Award of Distinction, Society of Automotive Historians.
- 2014 Second Prize, British Czech and Slovak Association International Writing Competition.
- 2015 International Deutsches Architekturmuseum Architectural Book Award.
- 2017 First Prize, British Czech and Slovak Association International Writing Competition.
- 2019 Honorary Silver Medal of Jan Masaryk.
- 2021 Miroslav Ivanov Prize for Non-fiction Literature.
- 2024 Second Prize, British Czech and Slovak Association International Writing Competition.

== See also ==
- Milada Horáková
- Slánský trial
- A Trial in Prague
- Tatra (company)
- Cantilever chair
- Memorial to the Victims of Communism

== Literature ==
- Margolius Kovály, Heda (1997): Under A Cruel Star: A Life in Prague 1941-1968, New York: Holmes & Meier, now distributed by Lynne Rienner Publishers, Boulder, Colorado ISBN 0-8419-1377-3
- Margolius, Ivan (2006): Reflections of Prague: Journeys through the 20th Century, London: Wiley, ISBN 0-470-02219-1
- Bell, Matthew (2019): 'Auto-Biography - Ivan Margolius', The Automobile, April 2019, Volume 37, Number 2, pp. 34 - 37.
