= Cultural Amnesia (book) =

2007 book of biographical essays by Clive James

- First edition (UK)
- Author: Clive James
- Cover artist: Peter Behrens
- Subject: essays
- Published: 2007 (MacMillan UK)
- Media type: hardcover
- Pages: 876

Cultural Amnesia is a book of biographical essays by Clive James, first published in 2007. The British title, published by MacMillan, is Cultural Amnesia: Notes in the Margin of My Time, while the American title, published by W. W. Norton, is Cultural Amnesia: Necessary Memories from History and the Arts. The cover illustration was adapted from a work by the German Modernist designer Peter Behrens.

== Contents ==
The book is a series of essays on 106 people James has been fascinated by, most of them from the 20th century. The chapters are in alphabetical order of the subject's name, as follows:

- Anna Akhmatova
- Peter Altenberg
- Louis Armstrong
- Raymond Aron
- Walter Benjamin
- Marc Bloch
- Jorge Luis Borges
- Robert Brasillach
- Sir Thomas Browne
- Albert Camus
- Dick Cavett
- Paul Celan
- Chamfort
- Coco Chanel
- Charles Chaplin
- Nirad C. Chaudhuri
- G. K. Chesterton
- Jean Cocteau
- Gianfranco Contini
- Benedetto Croce
- Tony Curtis
- Ernst Robert Curtius
- Miles Davis
- Sergei Diaghilev
- Pierre Drieu La Rochelle
- Alfred Einstein
- Duke Ellington
- Federico Fellini
- W. C. Fields
- F. Scott Fitzgerald
- Gustave Flaubert
- Sigmund Freud
- Egon Friedell
- François Furet
- Charles de Gaulle
- Edward Gibbon
- Terry Gilliam
- Joseph Goebbels
- Witold Gombrowicz
- William Hazlitt
- Georg Wilhelm Friedrich Hegel
- Heinrich Heine
- Adolf Hitler
- Ricarda Huch
- Ernst Jünger
- Franz Kafka
- John Keats
- Leszek Kołakowski
- Alexandra Kollontai
- Heda Margolius Kovály
- Karl Kraus
- Georg Christoph Lichtenberg
- Norman Mailer
- Nadezhda Mandelstam
- Golo Mann
- Heinrich Mann
- Michael Mann
- Thomas Mann
- Mao Zedong
- Chris Marker
- John McCloy
- Zinka Milanov
- Czesław Miłosz
- Eugenio Montale
- Montesquieu
- Alan Moorehead
- Paul Muratov
- Lewis Namier
- Grigory Ordzhonokidze
- Octavio Paz
- Alfred Polgar
- Beatrix Potter
- Jean Prévost
- Marcel Proust
- Edgar Quinet
- Marcel Reich-Ranicki
- Jean-François Revel
- Richard Rhodes
- Rainer Maria Rilke
- Virginio Rognoni
- Ernesto Sabato
- Edward Said
- Sainte-Beuve
- José Saramago
- Jean-Paul Sartre
- Erik Satie
- Arthur Schnitzler
- Sophie Scholl
- Wolf Jobst Siedler
- Manès Sperber
- Tacitus
- Margaret Thatcher
- Henning von Tresckow
- Leon Trotsky
- Karl Tschuppik
- Dubravka Ugrešić
- Miguel de Unamuno
- Pedro Henríquez Ureña
- Paul Valéry
- Mario Vargas Llosa
- Evelyn Waugh
- Ludwig Wittgenstein
- Isoroku Yamamoto
- Aleksandr Zinoviev
- Carl Zuckmayer
- Stefan Zweig

== Reception ==
Reviewing the book for The Atlantic, Christopher Hitchens argued that James tries "to glamorize the uninspiring - tries to show how tough and shapely were the common sense formulations of Raymond Aron for example, when set against the seductive, panoptic bloviations of Jean-Paul Sartre" and that he "succeeds in it by trying to comb out all centrist clichés and by caring almost as much about language as it is possible to do." Additionally, Hitchens noted that "a unifying principle of the collection is its feminism" and that "one of James's charms as a critic is that he genuinely seems to enjoy praising people."
