= Lise London =

French communist (1916 – 2012)

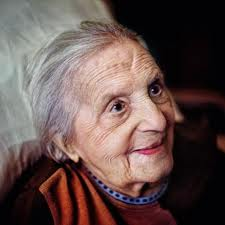
- Born: Élizabeth Ricol; 15 February 1916; Montceau-les-Mines, Saône-et-Loire, French Third Republic
- Died: 31 March 2012 (aged 96); 13th arrondissement of Paris, French Fifth Republic
- Resting place: Ivry Cemetery
- Occupations: Communist politician and activist

Lise London (15 February 1916 – 31 March 2012) was a French communist politician and activist. She fought for the International Brigades during the Spanish Civil War and for the French Resistance during World War II. She was the widow of Artur London, a Czechoslovak communist politician and co-defendant in the Slánský trial. Following her husband's show trial and imprisonment, she became a strong critic of Joseph Stalin and Stalinism.

== Biography ==
Élizabeth (nickname, Lise) Ricol was born in Montceau-les-Mines, France, in 1916 to parents from Spain. She became a member of the French Communist Party as a teenager. She moved to Moscow in the Soviet Union, where she first met and then married her husband, Artur London. The couple moved to Spain and joined the International Brigades at the outbreak of the Spanish Civil War in 1936. In a 2011 interview with El País, London described her involvement with the International Brigade as the "best moment" of her life, saying, "The Spanish people are always in my memories. I am constantly reminded of the Brigades, of my old friends; I dream about them. Spain was an ideal, our most beloved ideal, and it continues to be a valid ideal."

Lise and Artur moved to Paris in 1939 following the end of Spanish Civil War and the establishment of Francoist Spain. Nazi Germany soon invaded and occupied France in 1940. Both joined the French Resistance. In 1942, London was arrested and sent to Ravensbrück concentration camp, where she was held prisoner for the remainder of the war. In 1944 she was held with Louise Aslanian, with whom she became friends.

Lise London moved to Czechoslovakia with her husband after World War II. Artur London joined the new Communist Czechoslovak government as a deputy foreign minister. However, her husband fell out with authorities and Stalin, and was sentenced to life in prison during the Slánský trial in 1952. He was released in 1956 after Stalin's death and the couple returned to Paris. Artur London would later publish a play about his trial, The Confession, which was published in 1968. Artur London died in 1986. Lise London became a writer and author, especially focused on the experiences of her husband during the 1950s. Her books include "Mégère de la rue Daguerre", published in 1995.

In a 2011, interview with El País, London revealed that she had "tore up my membership card" and left the French Communist Party, though she remained a supporter of communism.

Lise London died on 31 March 2012 in Paris at the age of 96 and was buried with her husband at Ivry Cemetery in Ivry-sur-Seine.
