= Helen Epstein =

American writer of memoir, journalism and biography

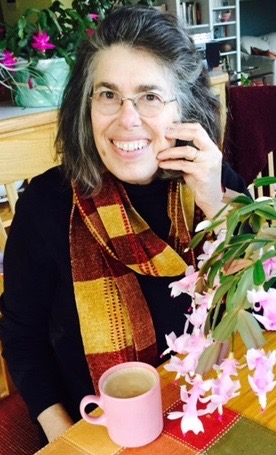
- Helen Epstein in 2016
- Born: November 27, 1947 (age 78); Prague, Czechoslovakia
- Education: Hunter College High School, Hebrew University, Columbia University Graduate School of Journalism
- Occupations: Writer of memoir, biography, and journalism
- Spouse: Patrick Mehr (m 1983)
- Children: Daniel Mehr, Samuel Mehr
- Writing career
- Notable work: Children of the Holocaust
- Website: www.helenepstein.com

Helen Epstein (born November 27, 1947) is an American writer of memoir, journalism and biography. Born in Czechoslovakia, she lives in Lexington, Massachusetts, United States.

== Early life and education ==
Helen Epstein is the daughter of Kurt Epstein and Franci Rabinek, both survivors of Nazi concentration camps. She was born in Prague in November 27, 1947, grew up in New York City, and graduated from Hunter College High School, Hebrew University, and the Columbia Graduate School of Journalism.

== Career ==
She became a journalist at the age of 20, while caught in the Soviet Invasion of Czechoslovakia. Her account was published in the Jerusalem Post and she has been a journalist ever since. Her articles and reviews have appeared in many major American publications and include profiles of art historian Meyer Schapiro and musicians Vladimir Horowitz and Leonard Bernstein.

Epstein is the author, co-author, translator or editor of ten books of narrative non-fiction including the non-fiction trilogy Children of the Holocaust, Where She Came From: A Daughter’s Search for Her Mother’s History and The Long Half-Lives of Love and Trauma; and Joe Papp: An American Life, the biography of a theater producer . She translated and edited Heda Kovaly’s Under a Cruel Star, co-wrote Paul Ornstein’s Looking Back: Memoir of a Psychoanalyst, and edited the tribute anthology Archivist on a Bicycle.''The Long Half-Lives of Love and Trauma was published in English and Czech in 2018. In 2020, she published her late mother's memoir as Franci's War and in 2022, her cancer memoir Getting Through It.

She was the first tenured female journalism professor in New York University (1981) and taught about 1,000 students over 12 years. She guest lectures extensively at universities, libraries and religious institutions in North America and abroad.

== Works ==
- Children of the Holocaust. Penguin Books. ISBN 0140112847
- Music Talks. McGraw-Hill. ISBN 0070195447
- Where She Came from: A Daughter's Search for Her Mother's History. Little Brown & Co. ISBN 0316246085
- The Companies She Keeps. Plunkett Lake Press. ISBN 0961469609
- Joe Papp. Da Capo Press. ISBN 0316246042
- Écrire la vie. La Cause des Livres. ISBN 2917336072
- Un athlète juif dans la tourmente. La Cause des Livres. ISBN 2917336196
- Under a Cruel Star. Holmes & Meier Publishers. ISBN 0841913773
- Acting in Terezín. Plunkett Lake Press.
- Looking Back: Memoir of a Psychoanalyst. Plunkett Lake Press. ISBN 0961469633
- Archivist on a Bicycle. Plunkett Lake Press.
- Franci's War. Penguin
- Getting Through It: My Year of Cancer during Covid Plunkett Lake Press
