= Artur London =

Czechoslovak communist politician

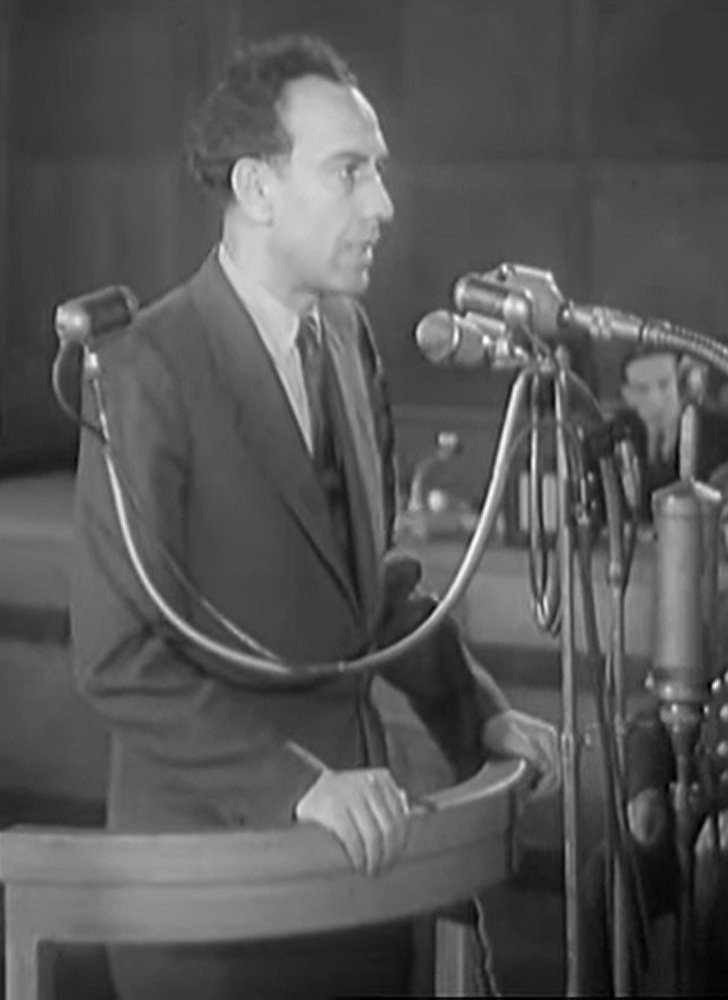
- London during the Slánský trial
- Born: February 1, 1915; Ostrava, Margraviate of Moravia, Austria-Hungary
- Died: November 8, 1986 (aged 71); Paris, French Fifth Republic
- Resting place: Ivry Cemetery
- Era: 20th century
- Known for: Defendant during the Slánský Trial
- Notable work: The Confession
- Political party: KSČ
- Other political affiliations: PCE
- Movement: Communism
- Criminal charges: Espionage
- Criminal penalty: Life imprisonment
- Criminal status: Commuted
- Spouse: Lise London
- Children: 3
- Father: Emil London
- Military career
- Allegiance: Spanish Republic; Free France
- Branch: SIM; French Resistance
- Service years: 1937–1939; 1940–1943
- Conflicts: Spanish Civil War; WWII

Artur London (1 February 1915 – 8 November 1986) was a Czechoslovak communist politician and co-defendant in the Slánský Trial in 1952. Though he was sentenced to life in prison, he was freed in 1955; he then settled in France with his wife Lise London. In 1968 he published his memoirs in L'Aveu (The Confession), a book which resonated internationally, adapted by Costa-Gavras as the movie of the same name.

== Biography ==
London was born in Ostrava, Moravia, Austria-Hungary (now Czech Republic) to a Jewish family.

London spent 1934 to 1937 in Moscow. In 1937, during the Spanish Civil War, he left for Barcelona where he worked for SIM (Servicio de Información Militar), an intelligence service run by the Soviet NKVD. He moved to France after the defeat of the Republicans. In World War II, he was active in the French resistance, was arrested by the Nazis and sent to the Mauthausen concentration camp. After the war, he lived in Switzerland but soon moved with family to Prague, where he became a leading figure in the Communist Party of Czechoslovakia and was eventually nominated deputy minister of foreign affairs in 1948.

In 1951, he was arrested and became a co-defendant with Rudolf Slánský in the Slánský trial, one of several show trials against Eastern European communists at the time. Accused of being a Zionist, Trotskyite and Titoist, he was forced to confess and sentenced to life in prison. After the Slánský trial, London collaborated with the authorities and served as a lead witness in other construed political processes against top Czechoslovak communists, such as Eduard Goldstücker, Josef Pavel, Osvald Závodský, Gustáv Husák, Otakar Hromádko and others.

Following Joseph Stalin's death in 1953, London was released in 1955. After his rehabilitation in 1963, he moved to France with his wife, Lise London, a French communist he had met in Moscow. In 1963, London published Espagne, a book about his time in the Spanish civil war. The couple wrote the book L’Aveu (1968), an autobiographical account of his ordeal in the Prague Trials. The English translation The Confession by Alastair Hamilton appeared in 1968. (In the United Kingdom, the translation was published in 1970 under the title On Trial). While the main defendants were senior to London, he gained prominence worldwide by writing the book.

The book was the basis for the film The Confession (1970) directed by Costa-Gavras, starring Yves Montand and Simone Signoret. Chris Marker made the short film On vous parle de Prague: Le deuxième procès d'Artur London, an on-set documentary about the making of this movie. Lise London later was interviewed for the documentary A Trial in Prague, directed by Zuzana Justman (2000, 83min).

Artur London died in Paris in 1986, aged 71. Lise died there in 2012, aged 96. They are both buried in the PCF plot at Ivry Cemetery in Ivry-sur-Seine.
