= Rudolf Slánský =

Czechoslovak politician (1901–1952)

- Born: 31 July 1901; Nezvěstice, Austria-Hungary
- Died: 3 December 1952 (aged 51); Prague, Czechoslovakia
- Occupation: Politician
- Known for: General Secretary of the Communist Party of Czechoslovakia

Rudolf Slánský (31 July 1901 – 3 December 1952) was a leading Czech communist politician. General Secretary of the Communist Party of Czechoslovakia immediately after World War II, he was one of the leading organizers of the party's rule from 1948.

Following the Tito-Stalin split, a wave of purges occurred in the ruling communist parties of Eastern Europe designed to ensure alignment to the Soviet Union. In Czechoslovakia, Slánský was one of 14 leaders arrested in 1951 and tortured into confessing "crimes". Put on show trial in November 1952, after eight days he was convicted of high treason and along with 10 others sentenced to death. Slánský was executed five days later in December 1952.

== Early life ==
Born at Nezvěstice, now in Plzeň-City District. Slánský's family was Jewish and conservative. He attended secondary school in Plzeň at the Commercial Academy.

After the end of World War I, he went to Prague, the capital, where he discovered a leftist intellectual scene in institutions such as the Marxist Club. In 1921, Slánský joined the Communist Party of Czechoslovakia when it broke away from the Social Democratic Party. He rose within the party and became a senior lieutenant of its leader, Klement Gottwald. At the Fifth Party Congress in 1929, Slánský was named a member of the party Presidium and the Politburo, and Gottwald became General Secretary.

From 1929 to 1935, Slánský lived in hiding due to the illegal status of the Communist Party. In 1935, after the party was allowed to participate in politics, both he and Gottwald were elected to the National Assembly. Their gains were halted, however, when Czechoslovakia was carved up at the Munich Conference in 1938. After Nazi Germany occupied the Sudetenland in October 1938, Slánský, along with much of the rest of the Czechoslovak communist leadership, fled to the Soviet Union.

In Moscow, Slánský worked on broadcasts to Czechoslovakia over Radio Moscow. He lived through the defense of Moscow against the Germans during the winter of 1941–42. His experience in Moscow brought him into contact with Soviet Communists and the often brutal methods they favored for maintaining party discipline.

In 1943 in Moscow, Slánský's infant daughter, Naďa (Nadia), was forcibly abducted from her baby carriage by a woman. The infant was in the company of her eight-year-old brother, Rudolf, who put up resistance. The woman revealed details about their mother, Mrs. Slánská, including her job with Radio Moscow. Neither Nadia nor the perpetrators were ever found. In her 1969 memoir, Josefa Slánská, Slánský's widow, recounted that written inquiries were made to the police and to Stalin himself, all of which went unanswered.

While in exile in the Soviet Union, Slánský also organized Czechoslovak army units. He returned with them to Czechoslovakia in 1944 to participate in the Slovak National Uprising.

== Power in the postwar period ==
In 1945, after World War II, Slánský and other Czechoslovak leaders returned from exile in London and Moscow, holding meetings to organize the new National Front government under Edvard Beneš. At the 8th Party Congress of the Communist Party of Czechoslovakia in March 1946, Slánský was chosen as General Secretary of the Communist Party. He was the number two man in the party behind party chairman Gottwald, who became leader of a coalition government after elections held that year.

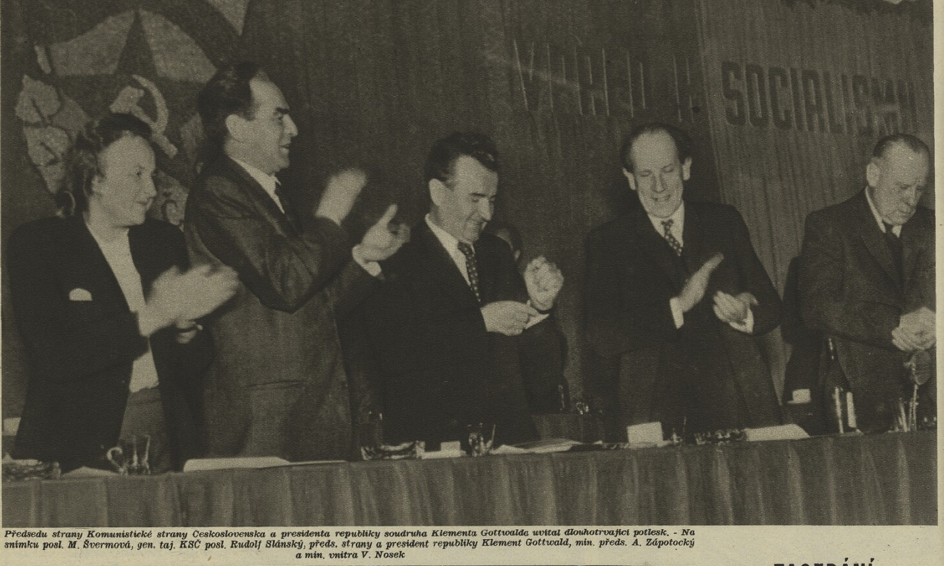
Meeting of the Central Committee of the KSŠ (1948); from left Marie Švermová, Slánský, Gottwald, Antonín Zápotocký, Václav Nosek

In 1948, after the Communist Party seized power in the February coup, Slánský became the second most powerful man in the country after Gottwald. At that point Slánský was blamed for economic and industrial troubles, costing him popular support. But he was also awarded the Order of Socialism, a top decoration, on 30 July 1951. Publication was planned for a book of his speeches in support of socialism, to be titled Towards the Victory of Socialism.

== Trial ==
In 1951, after Josip Broz Tito of Yugoslavia broke with him, Stalin decided to "purge" the Communist parties of the satellite countries of the Soviet Union in order to deter any further revolts against his rule. Most historians think that, fearing arrest and death, President Gottwald of Czechoslovakia decided to sacrifice his best friend, Rudolf Slánský, in order to save himself. On November 24, 1951, at 1 a.m. Slánský was arrested and imprisoned. During the following year he was tortured into confessing his "crimes". Bedřich Geminder and Jarmila Taussigová were also arrested the same day. Official USSR rhetoric had turned against Zionism. Stalin was intent on keeping power in the Eastern bloc countries.

Party rhetoric asserted that Slánský was spying as part of an international western capitalist conspiracy to undermine socialism and that punishing him would avenge the Nazi murders of Czech communists Jan Šverma and Julius Fučík during World War II.

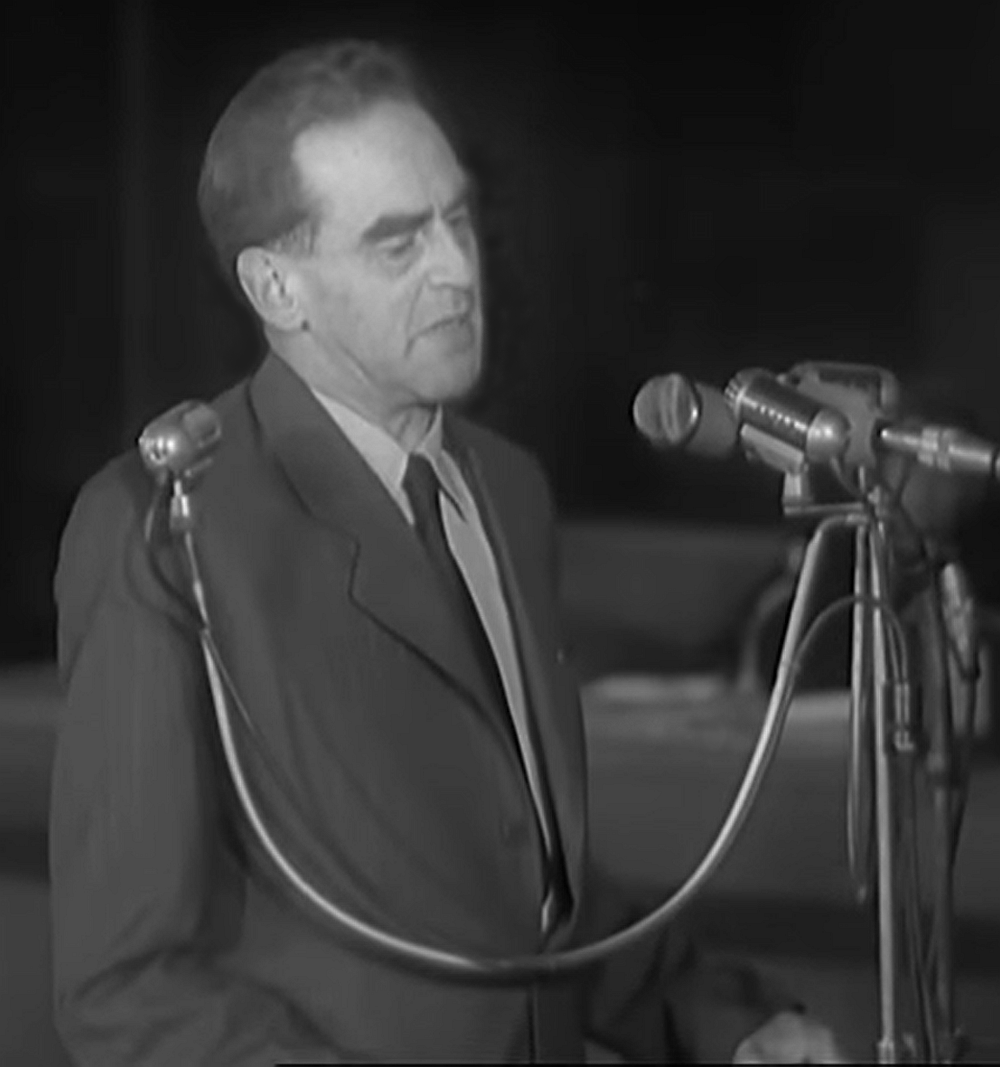
Slánský speaking during the trials

Some historians say that Stalin desired complete obedience from leaders of the so-called "People's Democracies" (that is, Eastern bloc countries), as well as at home. He threatened to conduct "purges" of the "nationalistic communists".

Other historians, though, say that the rivalry between Slánský and Gottwald escalated after the 1948 coup. Slánský began consolidating his power within the party secretariat and placing more of his party supporters in governmental positions, encroaching on Gottwald's position as president after the resignation of Beneš. Stalin backed Gottwald because he was believed to have a better chance of building up the Czechoslovak economy into a position where it could start producing useful goods for the Soviet Union.

Slánský was thought to be weakened by his image as a "cosmopolitan" figure. Gottwald and his ally Antonín Zápotocký, both populists, tarred Slánský with charges of belonging to the bourgeoisie. Slánský and his allies were also opposed by old-time party members, the government, and the party's Political Bureau. In prison after his arrest, Slánský was tortured and he attempted suicide.

The trial of the 14 national leaders began on 20 November 1952, in the Senate of the State Court, with the prosecutor being Josef Urválek. It lasted eight days. As in the Moscow show trials of the late 1930s, the defendants admitted guilt in court and requested a death sentence. Slánský was found guilty of "Trotskyite-Titoist-Zionist activities in the service of American imperialism." He was hanged at Pankrác Prison on 3 December 1952. His body was cremated, and the ashes were scattered on an icy road outside of Prague.

== Posthumously ==
Reflecting changes in Czechoslovakia, in April 1963 Slánský and other victims of the purge trials were cleared under the penal code. They were fully rehabilitated and exonerated in May 1968. After the Velvet Revolution of 1989, the new president Václav Havel, appointed Slánský's son, also named Rudolf, as the Czech ambassador to the Soviet Union.

Slánský was the most powerful politician to be executed during the rule of the Communist Party in Czechoslovakia and under the influence of Stalinism. Afterwards the treatment of leaders who had fallen out of favour with the government was more moderate; they were stripped of power and ordered to retire.

== See also ==
- Antisemitism in Europe
- Slánský trial
- Josef Urválek
- Vladimír Clementis
- Klement Gottwald
- Rudolf Margolius
- Artur London
- Traicho Kostov
- László Rajk
- Josef Smrkovský
- Eastern Bloc politics
- Hotel Lux
