= Slánský trial =

Antisemitic show trial

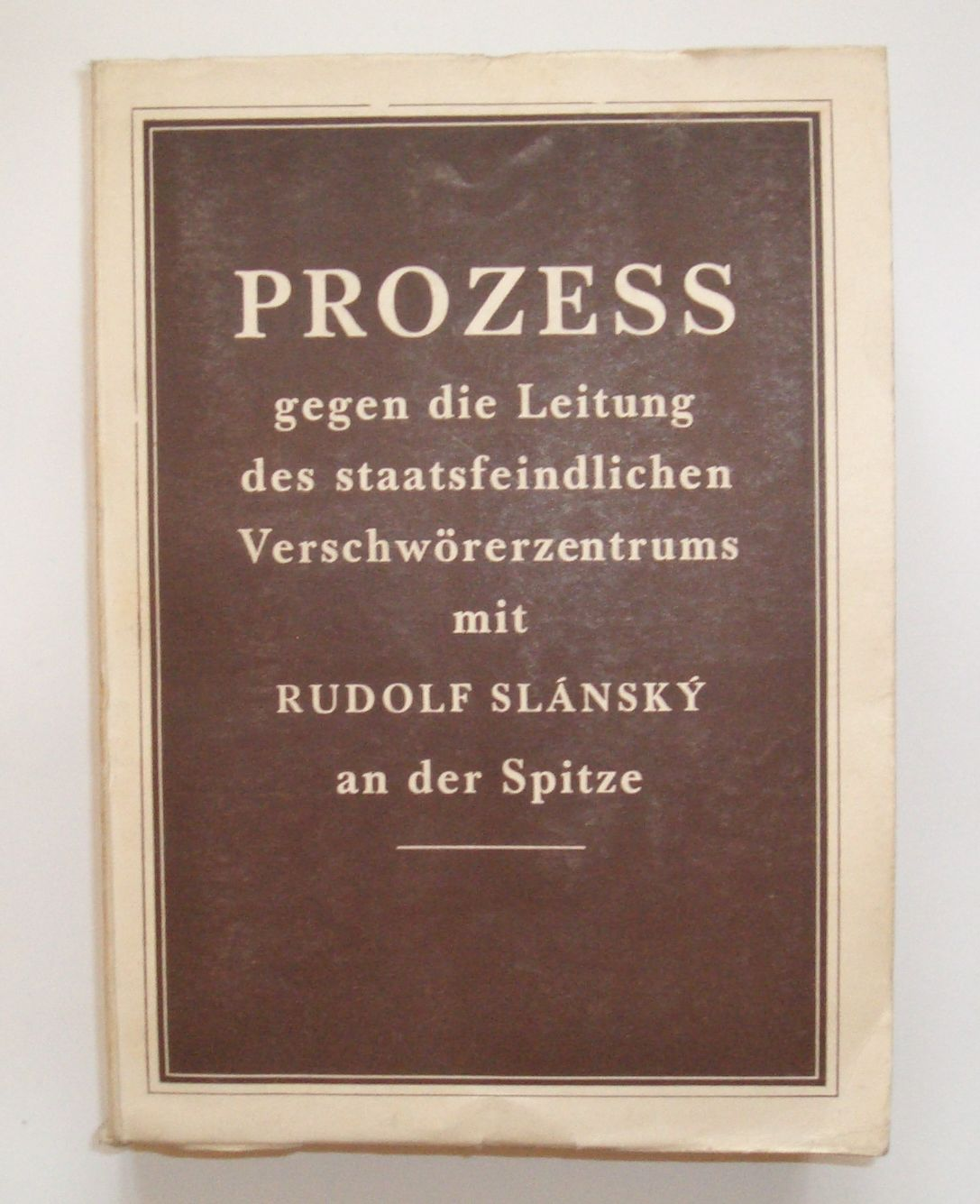
The official 1953 protocol, printed in Prague in at least seven languages (German edition pictured)

The Slánský trial (Note: Officially: Proces s vedením protistátního spikleneckého centra v čele s Rudolfem Slánským; English: "Trial of the Leadership of the Anti-State Conspiracy Centre Headed by Rudolf Slánský".) was a 1952 antisemitic show trial against fourteen members of the Communist Party of Czechoslovakia (KSČ), including many high-ranking officials. Several charges, including high treason, were announced against the group on the grounds of allegedly participating in a Zionist conspiracy against the Czechoslovak Republic. General Secretary of the KSČ Rudolf Slánský was the alleged leader of conspirators.

All fourteen defendants were found guilty. Eleven of them were sentenced to death and executed; the remaining three received life sentences. Eleven of the defendants were "of Jewish origin" and historians have referred to it as a key example of antisemitism in the Soviet Bloc.

== Background ==
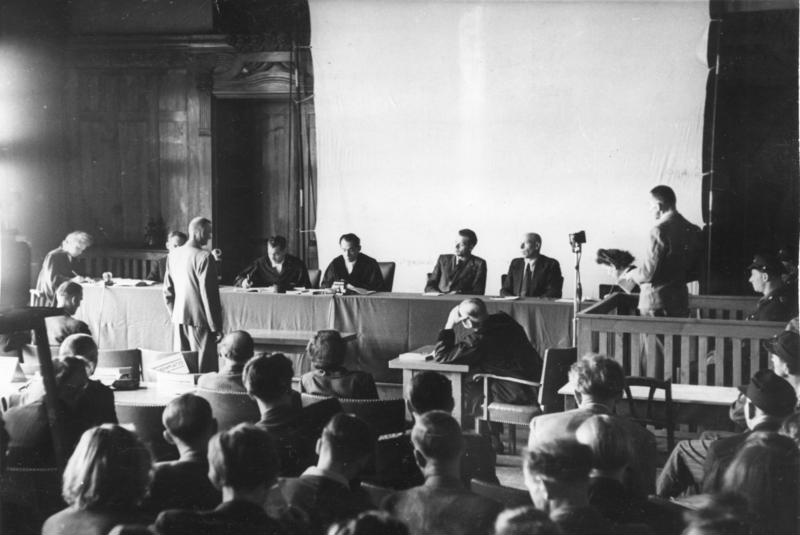
Waldheim Trials in East Germany, 21 June 1950

After World War II, Czechoslovakia initially enjoyed limited democracy. This changed with the February 1948 coup, carried out by the Communist Party of Czechoslovakia without the direct assistance of the Soviet Union. According to literature scholar Peter Steiner, the one-party Communist state had to find or conjure up imaginary enemies from within to justify its continuing existence; this was the motive for show trials. After the 1948 Tito–Stalin split, a sequence of high-level political trials against alleged Titoist and Western imperialist elements were held in Bulgaria, Hungary, and Albania, but these trials were not overtly antisemitic. The anti-cosmopolitan campaign, a thinly disguised antisemitic campaign in the Soviet Union under Joseph Stalin, began in the fall of 1948. In the year before Stalin's death in 1953 another Soviet antisemitic campaign, the Doctors' Plot, began to unfold. During this period, the Jewish Anti-Fascist Committee's leadership was murdered and antisemitic purges spread to other countries in the Soviet's Eastern Bloc.

== Arrests and interrogation ==
The trial was orchestrated (and the subsequent terror staged in Czechoslovakia) on the order of Moscow leadership by Soviet advisors, who were invited by Rudolf Slánský and Klement Gottwald, with the help of the Czechoslovak State Security personnel following the László Rajk trial in Budapest in September 1949. Klement Gottwald, president of Czechoslovakia and leader of the Communist Party, feared being purged and decided to sacrifice Slánský, a longtime collaborator and personal friend, who was the second-in-command of the party. The others were picked to convey a clear threat to different groups in the state bureaucracy. A couple of them (Šváb, Reicin) were brutal sadists, conveniently added for a more realistic show.

Those put on trial confessed to all crimes (under duress or after torture) and were sentenced to punishment. Slánský attempted suicide while in prison. The people of Czechoslovakia signed petitions asking for death for the alleged traitors, with 8,520 resolutions addressed to the CC KSČ and the state court arriving by December 5. Prosecutors claimed that a "Zionist-Imperialist" summit had taken place in Washington DC in April 1947 with President Harry S. Truman, undersecretary of state Dean Acheson, former treasury secretary Henry Morgenthau Jr., David Ben-Gurion and Moshe Sharret in attendance. The prosecution charged that defendants were acting in accordance with a so-called "Morgenthau Plan" (Note: not to be confused with the contemporaneous Morgenthau Plan for German heavy industry) to commit espionage and sabotage against Czechoslovakia for the US in exchange for American support for Israel. Czechoslovakia was seen as especially pro-Zionist due to their armament support for Israel during the Palestine War. The historian and polemicist Stephen Norwood has claimed that most of the defendants were in fact anti-Zionist.

== Trial ==
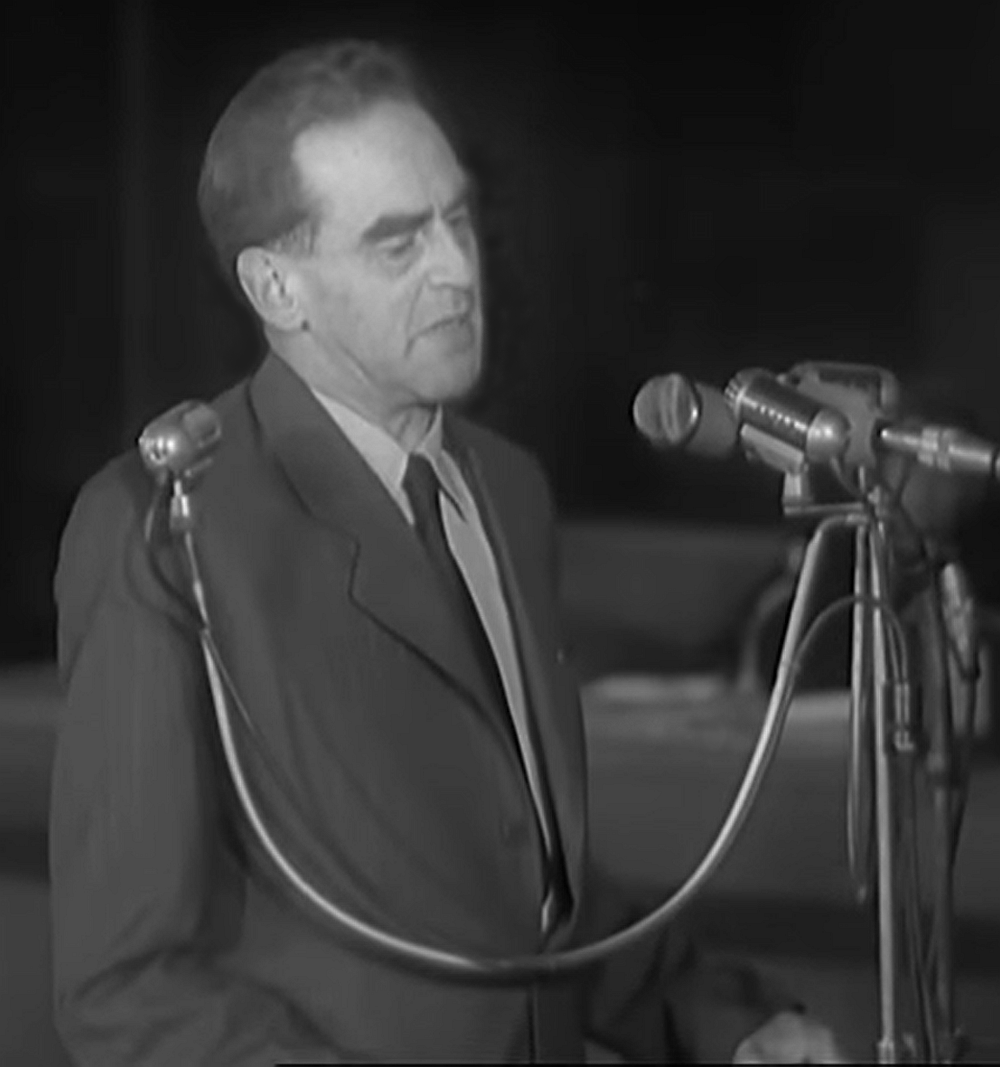
Slánský during the trial

The trial of Rudolf Slánský and 13 other high-ranking Communists (Bedřich Geminder, Otto Šling, André Simone, Karel Šváb, Otto Fischl, Rudolf Margolius, Vladimir Clementis, Ludvík Frejka, Bedřich Reicin, Artur London, Eugen Löbl, Josef Frank and Vavro Hajdů), 11 of whom, the lead prosecutor said, were "of Jewish origin", began on Thursday 20 November 1952. The state prosecutor at the trial in Prague was Josef Urválek, known for his participation in highest-profile show trials and theatrical speeches. The trial was recorded with daily broadcasts on the radio, as well as filmed.

The proceedings lasted eight days including the weekend; on 27th, only the judgment was delivered. Many of the defendants, denounced as Titoists and Zionists, admitted their guilt and requested death. All were pronounced guilty of high treason (velezrada), 11 also of espionage, 6 of sabotage, and Slánský with Frank and Reicin of military treason for supposedly giving aid to Nazis during the War. Eleven were hanged at Pankrác Prison in Prague on 3 December, and three sentenced only to life imprisonment: London and Hajdů were both rehabilitated in 1956, Löbl released in the 1960 amnesty.

== Reaction ==
=== Domestic ===
A Czech worker sent to attend the trial reported that the defendants did not display any emotion. He wondered why they were not afraid for their lives. On 14 December 1952, a few days after the execution, Zdeněk Nejedlý, Minister of Education, denied rumors that the confessions had been obtained with torture or drugs. Instead, the defendants admitted to their crimes because of the overwhelming evidence against them and because of their shame and guilt. Many Czechoslovak citizens were in favor of harsh measures against the supposed traitors. Czech poet Ivan Skála called for "a dog's death for [such] dogs" (Czech: Psovi psí smrt!).

After the deaths of both Stalin and Gottwald in March 1953, the harshness of the persecutions slowly decreased, and the victims of the trial quietly received amnesty one by one, including those who had survived the Prague Trial. Later, the official historiography of the Communist Party was rather quiet on the trial, vaguely putting blame on errors that happened as a result of a "cult of personality." Many other political trials followed on, sending many innocent victims to jail and hard labour in the Jáchymov uranium mines and labour camps.

The full transcript of the trial was released in 1953; Steiner described it as "an utterly indigestible book, crammed with so many names, dates, and particulars that I had a hard time finishing it and remembering all the details."

=== International ===
Raphael Lemkin considered the trial an example of judicial murder and, along with the fabrication of evidence to claim Jewish doctors were plotting to kill Soviet officials (the spuriously alleged Doctors' Plot), a potential precursor to the genocide of Jews in the Soviet bloc. He asked the United Nations to launch an investigation into the alleged genocide of Jews in the Soviet bloc. In Commentary, Peter Meyer wrote that "the Prague trial with its lurid tale of a 'Zionist conspiracy' recalled the Czarist-invented and Nazi-popularized legend of the Elders of Zion".

David Ben-Gurion, speaking hypothetically in the wake of both the Doctors Plot trial and the Slánský trial, considered suppressing Maki, the Israeli communist party. In internal discussions, Ben-Gurion suggested he would favor this even to the point of throwing communist activists in concentration camps, though he spoke of this as being a potential response rather than an imminent necessity. "If there is a need to build camps, we will do it. If there is a need to shoot, we will shoot. We have already been through times when there was a need to shoot people – people who were even closer to us." This last comment referred to an earlier moment in Israel's recent history where he first warned and then approved firing on the right-wing paramilitary group Irgun. A majority of the cabinet opposed Ben-Gurion's view, including Golda Meir and Pinhas Lavon. Lavon observed in the discussion that an attempt to detain members of Maki would result in greater, not lesser influence for the party. The cabinet, by a vote of 13–7, voted for an alternate proposal which permitted "the employment of all means at the government's disposal, in the framework of the existing law and of laws yet to be passed, to deny Maki the opportunity to take public action, without declaring it an organization that exists outside the law."

Defense of the American Jewish Soviet spies Julius and Ethel Rosenberg surged in November and December 1952 and was organized by the Communist Party of the Soviet Union—confirmation of which occurred with the publication of KGB documents obtained by Alexander Vassiliev in 2011. Proponents of clemency argued that the Rosenbergs were actually "innocent Jewish peace activists". According to American historian Ronald Radosh, the Soviet Union's goal was "to deflect the world's attention from the sordid execution of the innocent [Slánský trial defendants] in Prague".

== Modern interpretations ==
The Israeli-American scholar Martin Wein observed that although Slánský was not guilty of the charges he was forced to admit, he was guilty of mass murder as a high-level functionary in the Communist government. In Wein's opinion, because all of the defendants (except Simone and Margolius) occupied high positions in the Czechoslovak Communist regime, they had command responsibility for crimes committed by it. Wein further commented that the three reprieved defendants all came from an upper-class background, while all of the middle-class and working-class defendants were executed. He hypothesizes that this was because if an upper-class person was a traitor to the Communist Party, he was not a traitor to his class. According to Stephen Norwood, the Slánský trial was the "clearest illustration yet of state-sponsored antisemitism in the Soviet bloc" and "a secularized version of the Spanish Inquisition's racialized antisemitism", because it insisted on that Jewish origin was an indelible defect which would pass to all descendents (similar to the guilt of Jewish deicide).

== In popular culture ==
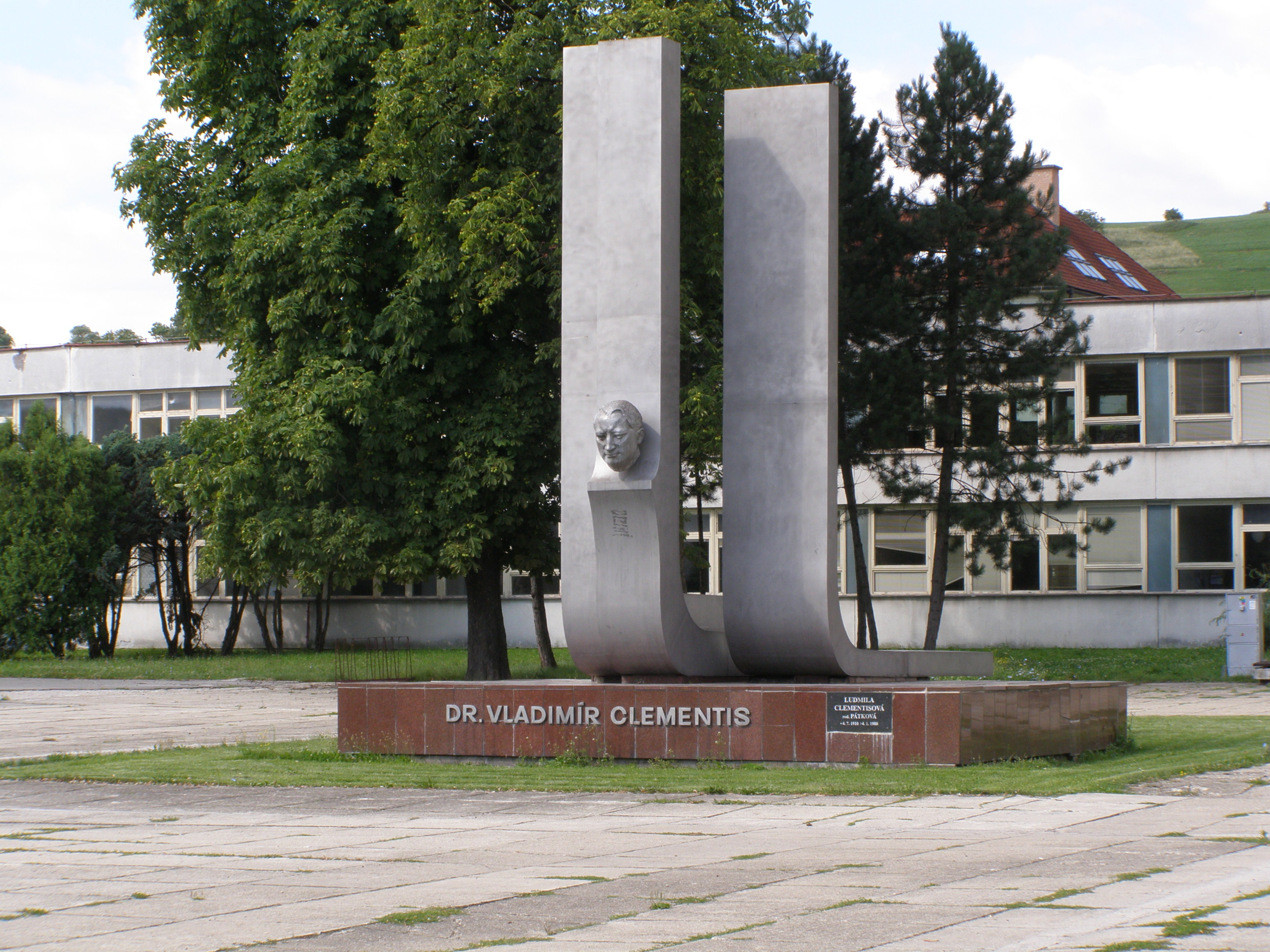
Bust of Clementis in Tisovec, Slovakia

Artur London, one of the survivors of the trial, eventually moved to France, where he published his memoirs in 1968. His book L'Aveu ("The Confession"), is a major source about the trial. L'Aveu (1970), a film based on London's book, was directed by Costa-Gavras and starred Yves Montand and Simone Signoret.

The Slánský trial is also a key element of the book Under a Cruel Star. A memoir by Heda Margolius Kovály, the book follows the life of a Jewish woman, starting with her escape from a concentration camp during World War II, up until her departure from Czechoslovakia after the Warsaw Pact countries invasion of 1968. Kovály's husband, Rudolf Margolius, a fellow Holocaust survivor, was one of the 11 men executed during the Slánský trial. More encompassing information is available in the more recent book Hitler, Stalin and I, an interview of Heda Margolius Kovály by Helena Třeštíková published in 2018. Martin Wein was critical of the positive image of Margolius in Kovály's book and in other media (Igor Lukes described him as "a clean man in a filthy time"), which he felt downplayed Margolius' complicity with the Stalinist regime. David Hertl on the other hand emphasised the mystery of Rudolf Margolius inclusion in the trial in his recent Czech interview program, The Youngest Hanged in the Trial with the Slánský Group was Rudolf Margolius. But Why Him, is a Mystery to Historians. (Nejmladším oběšeným v procesu se skupinou Slánského byl Rudolf Margolius. Proč zrovna on, je ale pro historiky záhadou.) broadcast on Czech Radio Plus, December 1, 2022.

The Slánský trial is the subject of the 2000 documentary A Trial in Prague, directed by Zuzana Justman.

On 22 March 2018, it was announced that insolvency administrators discovered 8.5 hours of original footage from the trial at a factory near Prague. The film was heavily damaged, and restoration is expected to take several years, to be paid for by the Ministry of Culture.

== Film documentary ==
Le Procès – Prague 1952, an 1hr 10min French documentary film by Ruth Zylberman for ARTE France & Pernel Media had the world premiere at FIPADOC International Documentary Festival, Biarritz, France on January 18, 2022. The new documentary made from the Slánský trial film and audio archives found by chance in 2018 in a warehouse in the suburb of Prague served as a starting point for the film. The director tells the trial through the descendants of three of the condemned: the daughter and grandson of Rudolf Slánský, the son and granddaughter of Rudolf Margolius, both executed after the trial, and the three children of Artur London, sentenced to life imprisonment.

== See also ==
- 1968 Polish political crisis
- Doctors' plot
- Anti-Jewish violence in Central and Eastern Europe, 1944–1946
- Night of the Murdered Poets
- László Rajk
