= Joseph Stalin and antisemitism =

The accusation that Joseph Stalin was antisemitic is much discussed by historians. Although part of a movement that included Jews and ostensibly rejected antisemitism, he privately displayed a contemptuous attitude toward Soviet Jews on various occasions that were witnessed by his contemporaries, and are documented by historical sources. Stalin argued that the Jews possessed a national character but were not a nation and were thus unassimilable. He argued that Jewish nationalism, particularly Zionism, was hostile to socialism. At the time of his death, Stalin was allegedly planning an even larger campaign against Jews, which included the deportation of all Jews within the Soviet Union to Northern Kazakhstan. According to his successor Nikita Khrushchev, Stalin was fomenting the doctors' plot as a pretext for further anti-Jewish repressions.

Stalin publicly condemned antisemitism, although he was repeatedly accused of it. People who knew him, such as Khrushchev, suggested he long harboured negative sentiments toward Jews. It has been argued that antisemitic trends in his policies were fuelled by Stalin's struggle against Leon Trotsky. After Stalin's death, Khrushchev claimed that Stalin encouraged him to incite antisemitism in Ukraine, allegedly telling him that "the good workers at the factory should be given clubs so they can beat the hell out of those Jews." In 1946, Stalin allegedly said privately that "every Jew is a potential spy". Robert Conquest stated that although Stalin had Jewish associates, he promoted antisemitism. Robert Service cautioned that there was no irrefutable evidence of antisemitism in Stalin's published work, although his private statements and public actions were "undeniably reminiscent of crude antagonism towards Jews"; Service added that throughout Stalin's life, he "would be the friend, associate or leader of countless individual Jews". According to Beria, Stalin had affairs with Jewish women.

== History ==
=== Early years ===
No aspect of Stalin's upbringing in Gori, Georgia, his education at an Orthodox seminary in Tiflis, or his political activities up to 1906 stands out as a motive to later antisemitism. Interactions with Jews were infrequent and unlikely to concern him as such. He began meeting Jews more frequently with the Stockholm Congress, including zealous revolutionaries whose competition he might have resented.

Stalin's earliest antisemitic rhetoric appears in relation to the rivalry between the Bolshevik and Menshevik political factions. Jews were active in both groups, but more prominent among the Mensheviks. Stalin took note of the ethnic proportions represented on each side, as seen from a 1907 report on the Congress published in the Bakinsky rabochy (Baku Workman), which quoted a coarse joke about "a small pogrom" (погромчик) Stalin attributed to then-Bolshevik Grigory Aleksinsky:

Not less interesting is the composition of the congress from the standpoint of nationalities. Statistics showed that the majority of the Menshevik faction consists of Jews—and this of course without counting the Bundists—after which came Georgians and then Russians. On the other hand, the overwhelming majority of the Bolshevik faction consists of Russians, after which come Jews—not counting of course the Poles and Letts—and then Georgians, etc. For this reason one of the Bolsheviks observed in jest (it seems Comrade Aleksinsky) that the Mensheviks are a Jewish faction and the Bolsheviks a genuine Russian faction, so it would not be a bad idea for us Bolsheviks to arrange a small pogrom in the party.

=== 1917 to 1930 ===
Although the Bolsheviks regarded all religious activity as counter-scientific superstition and a remnant of the old pre-communist order, the new political order established by Lenin's Soviet after the Russian Revolution ran counter to the centuries of antisemitism under the Romanovs. The Council of People's Commissars adopted a 1918 decree condemning all antisemitism and calling on the workers and peasants to combat it. Lenin continued to speak out against antisemitism. Information campaigns against antisemitism were conducted in the Red Army and in the workplaces, and a provision forbidding the incitement of propaganda against any ethnicity became part of Soviet law. State-sponsored institutions of secular Yiddish culture, such as the Moscow State Jewish Theater, were established in Soviet Russia and the Soviet Union during this time, as were institutions for other minorities.

As People's Commissar for Nationalities, Stalin was the cabinet member responsible for minority affairs. In 1922, Stalin was elected the first-ever General Secretary of the party—a post not yet regarded as the highest in the Soviet government. Lenin began to criticize Stalin shortly thereafter. In his December 1922 letters, the ailing Lenin (whose health left him incapacitated in 1923–1924) criticized Stalin and Dzerzhinsky for their chauvinistic attitude toward the Georgian nation during the Georgian Affair. Eventually made public as part of Lenin's Testament—which recommended that the party remove Stalin from his post as General Secretary—the 1922 letters and the recommendation were both withheld from public circulation by Stalin and his supporters in the party: these materials were not published in the Soviet Union until de-Stalinization in 1956.

After the incapacitated Lenin's death on 21 January 1924, the party officially maintained the principle of collective leadership, but Stalin soon outmaneuvered his rivals in the Central Committee's Politburo. At first collaborating with Jewish and half-Jewish Politburo members Grigory Zinoviev and Lev Kamenev against Jewish arch-rival Leon Trotsky, Stalin succeeded in marginalizing Trotsky. By 1929, Stalin had also effectively marginalized Zinoviev and Kamenev as well, compelling both to submit to his authority. The intransigent Trotsky was forced into exile. According to Polish historian, Marian Kamil Dziewanowski, Kamenev was denied the position of Chairman of the Soviet Union on Stalin's suggestion due to his Jewish origins. Stalin favoured Alexei Rykov and placed him in the position due to his Russian, peasant background. When Boris Bazhanov, Stalin's personal secretary who had defected to France in 1928, produced a memoir critical of Stalin in 1930, he alleged that Stalin made crude antisemitic outbursts even before Lenin's death.

At the 15th Party Congress in December 1927, Stalin publicly condemned growing antisemitism among workers, calling it an "evil" that "must be combated with utmost ruthlessness."

=== 1930s to 1940s ===
==== Stalin's 1931 condemnation of antisemitism ====
On 12 January 1931, Stalin gave the following answer to an inquiry on the subject of the Soviet attitude toward antisemitism from the Jewish News Agency in the United States:

National and racial chauvinism is a vestige of the misanthropic customs characteristic of the period of cannibalism. Anti-semitism, as an extreme form of racial chauvinism, is the most dangerous vestige of cannibalism.

Anti-semitism is of advantage to the exploiters as a lightning conductor that deflects the blows aimed by the working people at capitalism. Anti-semitism is dangerous for the working people as being a false path that leads them off the right road and lands them in the jungle. Hence Communists, as consistent internationalists, cannot but be irreconcilable, sworn enemies of anti-semitism.

In the U.S.S.R. anti-semitism is punishable with the utmost severity of the law as a phenomenon deeply hostile to the Soviet system. Under U.S.S.R. law active anti-semites are liable to the death penalty.

==== Establishment of Jewish Autonomous Oblast ====
To offset the growing Jewish national and religious aspirations of Zionism and to successfully categorize Soviet Jews under Stalin's nationality policy, an alternative to the Land of Israel was established with the help of Komzet and OZET in 1928. The Jewish Autonomous Oblast with the center in Birobidzhan in the Russian Far East was to become a "Soviet Zion". Yiddish, rather than "reactionary" Hebrew, would be the national language, and proletarian socialist literature and arts would replace Judaism as the quintessence of culture. Despite a massive domestic and international state propaganda campaign, the Jewish population there never reached 30% (as of 2003 it was only about 1.2%). The experiment ground to a halt in the mid-1930s, during Stalin's first campaign of purges, as local leaders were not spared during the purges.

==== Great Purge ====
Stalin's harshest period of mass repression, the Great Purge (or Great Terror), was launched in 1936–1937 and involved the execution of over a half-million Soviet citizens accused of treason, terrorism, and other anti-Soviet crimes. The campaign of purges prominently targeted Stalin's former opponents and other Old Bolsheviks, and included a large-scale purge of the Communist Party of the Soviet Union, repression of the kulak peasants, Red Army leaders, and ordinary citizens accused of conspiring against Stalin's administration. Although many of Great Purge victims were ethnic or religious Jews, they were not specifically targeted as an ethnic group during this campaign according to Mikhail Baitalsky, Gennady Kostyrchenko, David Priestland, Jeffrey Veidlinger, Roy Medvedev, and Edvard Radzinsky. Antony Polonsky argued that Jews suffered significantly during the 1936 phase of the Purge because they were overrepresented among Soviet officials.

==== German–Soviet rapprochement and the Molotov–Ribbentrop Pact ====
According to glasnost leader Alexander Yakolev, during his meeting with Nazi Germany's foreign minister Joachim von Ribbentrop, Stalin promised him to get rid of the "Jewish domination", especially among the intelligentsia. After dismissing Maxim Litvinov as Foreign Minister in 1939, Stalin immediately directed incoming Foreign Minister Vyacheslav Molotov to "purge the ministry of Jews", to appease Hitler and to signal Nazi Germany that the USSR was ready for non-aggression talks. When recalling this statement, however, Molotov said Stalin probably didn’t have antisemitic intent, for he was concerned more with bringing more ethnic Russians into top positions. Many Jewish figures such as Alexander Weissberg-Cybulski and Fritz Houtermans were arrested in 1937 by the NKVD and turned over to the German Gestapo.

Antisemitic trends in Stalin's policies were fueled by his struggle against Leon Trotsky and his global base of support. In the late 1930s, 1940s, and 1950s far fewer Jews were appointed to positions of power in the state apparatus than previously, with a sharp drop in Jewish representation in senior positions evident from around the time of the beginning of the late 1930s rapprochement with Nazi Germany. The percentage of Jews in positions of power dropped to 6% in 1938, and to 5% in 1940.

==== Relocation and deportation of Jews during the war ====
Following the Soviet invasion of Poland, Stalin began a policy of deporting Jews to the Jewish Autonomous Oblast and other parts of Siberia. When these populations reached their destinations, work was oftentimes arduous and they were subjected to poor conditions due to lack of resources caused by the war effort.

=== World War II and Zionism ===
Stalin wanted a Jewish state in Palestine friendly to the Soviet Union and even remarked to Franklin D. Roosevelt at the sidelines of the Yalta Conference that he was a Zionist "in principle" when Roosevelt probed him on the issue. However, when Roosevelt quipped that he was going to send six million American Jews as a "gift" to King Ibn Saud of Saudi Arabia in their upcoming meeting, Stalin complained about the lack of cooperation from Soviet Jews in his plan in establishing an autonomous Jewish region in Birobidzhan and noted that Jews were "middlemen, profiteers and parasites."

=== After World War II ===
The experience of the Holocaust, which resulted in the murder of approximately six million Jews in Europe under Nazi occupation, and left millions more homeless and displaced, contributed to growing concern about the situation of the Jewish people worldwide. However, the trauma breathed new life into the traditional idea of a common Jewish peoplehood and became a catalyst for the revival of the Zionist idea of creating a Jewish state in the Middle East. The Jewish Autonomous Oblast experienced a revival as the Soviet government sponsored the migration of as many as 10,000 Eastern European Jews to Birobidzhan in 1946–1948. In early 1946, the Council of Ministers of the USSR announced a plan to build new infrastructure, and Mikhail Kalinin, a champion of the Birobidzhan project since the late 1920s, stated that he still considered the region to be a "Jewish national state" that could be revived through "creative toil."

==== Israel ====
From late 1944 onward, Joseph Stalin adopted a pro-Zionist foreign policy, apparently believing that the new country would be socialist and would speed the decline of British influence in the Middle East. Accordingly, in November 1947, the Soviet Union, together with the other Soviet bloc countries voted in favor of the United Nations Partition Plan for Palestine, which paved the way for the creation of the State of Israel. On May 17, 1948, three days after Israel declared its independence, the Soviet Union became the first state to officially recognize Israel. In the 1948 Arab–Israeli War, the Soviet Union supported Israel with weaponry supplied via Czechoslovakia.

Nonetheless, Stalin began a new purge by repressing his wartime allies, the Jewish Anti-Fascist Committee. In January 1948, Solomon Mikhoels was assassinated on Stalin's personal orders in Minsk. His murder was disguised as a hit-and-run car accident. Mikhoels was taken to an MGB dacha and killed, along with his non-Jewish colleague Golubov-Potapov, under supervision of Stalin's Deputy Minister of State Security Sergei Ogoltsov. Golubov-Potapov, who was an agent of the MGB, was used to lure Mikhoels to the dacha and both were forced to drink alcohol. Both were killed and their bodies were then dumped by the side of a road in Minsk.

Despite Stalin's initial willingness to support Israel, various historians speculate that antisemitism in the late 1940s and early 1950s was motivated by Stalin's possible perception of Jews as a potential "fifth column" in light of a pro-Western Israel in the Middle East. Orlando Figes suggests that

"After the foundation of Israel in May 1948, and its alignment with the USA in the Cold War, the 2 million Soviet Jews, who had always remained loyal to the Soviet system, were portrayed by the Stalinist regime as a potential fifth column. Despite his personal dislike of Jews, Stalin had been an early supporter of a Jewish state in Palestine, which he had hoped to turn into a Soviet satellite in the Middle East. But as the leadership of the emerging state proved hostile to approaches from the Soviet Union, Stalin became increasingly afraid of pro-Israeli feeling among Soviet Jews. His fears intensified as a result of Golda Meir's arrival in Moscow in the autumn of 1948 as the first Israeli ambassador to the USSR. On her visit to a Moscow synagogue on Yom Kippur (13 October), thousands of people lined the streets, many of them shouting Am Yisroel Chai! (The People of Israel Live!)—a traditional affirmation of national renewal to Jews throughout the world but to Stalin a dangerous sign of 'bourgeois Jewish nationalism' that subverted the authority of the Soviet state."

Historians Albert S. Lindemann and Richard S. Levy observe: "When, in October 1948, during the high holy days, thousands of Jews rallied around Moscow's central synagogue to honor Golda Meir, the first Israeli ambassador, the authorities became especially alarmed at the signs of Jewish disaffection. Jeffrey Veidlinger writes: "By October 1948, it was obvious that Mikhoels was by no means the sole advocate of Zionism among Soviet Jews. The revival of Jewish cultural expression during the war had fostered a general sense of boldness among the Jewish masses. Many Jews remained oblivious to the growing Zhdanovshchina and the threat to Soviet Zionist Jews that the brewing campaign against "rootless cosmopolitans" signaled. Indeed, official attitudes toward Jewish culture were ambivalent during this period. On the surface, Jewish culture seemed to be supported by the state: public efforts had been made to sustain the Yiddish theater after Mikhoels's death, Eynikayt was still publishing on schedule, and, most important, the Soviet Union recognized the establishment of a Jewish state in Palestine. To most Moscow Jews, the state of Soviet Jewry had never been better."

==== Purges ====
In November 1948, Soviet authorities launched a campaign to liquidate what was left of Jewish culture. The leading members of the Jewish Anti-Fascist Committee were arrested. They were charged with treason, bourgeois nationalism, and planning to set up a Jewish republic in Crimea to serve American interests. The Museum of Environmental Knowledge of the Jewish Autonomous Oblast (established in November 1944) and The Jewish Museum in Vilnius (established at the end of the war) were closed in 1948. The Historical-Ethnographic Museum of Georgian Jewry, established in 1933, was shut down at the end of 1951.

In Birobidzhan, the various Jewish cultural institutions that had been established under Stalin's earlier policy of support for "proletarian Jewish culture" in the 1930s were closed between late 1948 and early 1949. These included the Kaganovich Yiddish Theater, the Yiddish publishing house, the Yiddish newspaper Birobidzhan, the library of Yiddish and Hebrew books, and the local Jewish schools. The same happened to Yiddish theaters all over the Soviet Union, beginning with the Odessa Yiddish Theater and including the Moscow State Jewish Theater.

In early February 1949, the Stalin Prize-winning microbiologist Nikolay Gamaleya, a pioneer of bacteriology and member of the Academy of Sciences, wrote a personal letter to Stalin, protesting the growing antisemitism: "Judging by absolutely indisputable and obvious indications, the reappearance of antisemitism is not coming from below, not from the masses. . . but is directed from above, by someone's invisible hand. Antisemitism is coming from some high-placed persons who have taken up posts in the leading party organs." The ninety-year-old scientist wrote to Stalin again in mid-February, again mentioning the growing antisemitism. In March, Gamaleya died, still having received no answer.

During the night of 12–13 August 1952, remembered as the "Night of the Murdered Poets" (Ночь казнённых поэтов), thirteen of the most prominent Yiddish writers of the Soviet Union were executed on the orders of Stalin. Among the victims were Peretz Markish, David Bergelson and Itzik Fefer.

In a 1 December 1952 Politburo session, Stalin announced: "Every Jewish nationalist is the agent of the American intelligence service. Jewish nationalists think that their nation was saved by the USA. . . They think they are indebted to the Americans. Among doctors, there are many Jewish nationalists." He also quoted Jean-Jacques Rousseau's "eat the rich" in this speech..

A notable campaign to quietly remove Jews from positions of authority within the state security services was carried out in 1952–1953. The Russian historians Zhores and Roy Medvedev wrote that according to MVD General Sudoplatov, "simultaneously all Jews were removed from the leadership of the security services, even those in very senior positions. In February the anti-Jewish expulsions were extended to regional branches of the MGB. A secret directive was distributed to all regional directorates of the MGB on 22 February, ordering that all Jewish employees of the MGB be dismissed immediately, regardless of rank, age or service record. . . ."

The outside world was not ignorant of these developments, and even the leading members of the Communist Party USA complained about the situation. In the memoir Being Red, the American writer and prominent Communist Howard Fast recalls a meeting with Soviet writer and World Peace Congress delegate Alexander Fadeyev during this time. Fadeyev insisted that "There is no anti-Semitism in the Soviet Union", despite the evidence "that at least eight leading Jewish figures in the Red Army and in government had been arrested on what appeared to be trumped-up charges. Yiddish-language newspapers had been suppressed. Schools that taught Hebrew had been closed."

==== Doctors' plot ====
In secondary evidence and memoirs, there is a view that the Doctors' plot case was intended to trigger mass repressions and deportations of the Jews, similar to the population transfer in the Soviet Union of many other ethnic minorities, but the plan was not accomplished because of the sudden death of Stalin. Zhores Medvedev wrote that there are no documents found in support of the deportation plan, and Gennady Kostyrchenko writes the same. Nevertheless, the question remains open.

According to Louis Rapoport, the genocide was planned to start with the public execution of the imprisoned doctors, and then the "following incidents would follow", such as "attacks on Jews orchestrated by the secret police, the publication of the statement by the prominent Jews, and a flood of other letters demanding that action be taken. A three-stage program of genocide would be followed. First, almost all Soviet Jews ... would be shipped to camps east of the Urals ... Second, the authorities would set Jewish leaders at all levels against one another ... Also the MGB [Secret Police] would start killing the elites in the camps, just as they had killed the Yiddish writers ... the previous year. The ... final stage would be to 'get rid of the rest.'"

Four large camps were built in southern and western Siberia shortly before Stalin's death in 1953, and there were rumors that they were for Jews. A special Deportation Commission to plan the deportation of Jews to these camps was allegedly created. Nikolay Poliakov, the secretary of the Deportation Commission, stated years later that according to Stalin's initial plan the deportation was to begin in the middle of February 1953, but the monumental task of compiling lists of Jews had not yet been completed. "Pure blooded" Jews were to be deported first, followed by "half-breeds" (polukrovki). Before his death in March 1953, Stalin allegedly had planned the execution of Doctors' plot defendants already on trial in Red Square in March 1953, and then he would cast himself as the savior of Soviet Jews by sending them to camps away from the purportedly enraged Russian populace. There are further statements that describe some aspects of such a planned deportation.

Similar purges against Jews were organised in the Eastern Bloc countries, such as with the Prague Trials. During this time, Soviet Jews were dubbed persons of Jewish ethnicity. A dean of the Marxism–Leninism department at a Soviet university explained the policy to his students: "One of you asked if our current political campaign can be regarded as antisemitic. Comrade Stalin said: "We hate Nazis not because they are Germans, but because they brought enormous suffering to our land. Same can be said about the Jews." It has also been said that at the time of Stalin's death, "no Jew in Russia could feel safe." Throughout this time, the Soviet media avoided overt antisemitism and continued to report the punishment of officials for antisemitic behavior.

== Associates and family ==
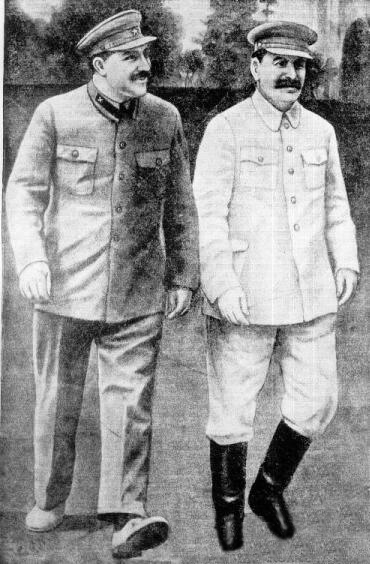
Stalin with Lazar Kaganovich (left)

Stalin had Jewish in-laws and grandchildren. Some of Stalin's close associates were also Jews or had Jewish spouses, including Lazar Kaganovich, Maxim Litvinov, and Lev Mekhlis. Many of them were purged, including Nikolai Yezhov's wife and Polina Zhemchuzhina, who was Vyacheslav Molotov's wife, and also Bronislava Poskrebysheva. Historian Geoffrey Roberts points out that Stalin "continued to fête Jewish writers and artists even at the height of the anti-Zionist campaign of the early 1950s." However, when Stalin's young daughter Svetlana fell in love with prominent Soviet filmmaker Alexei Kapler, a Jewish man twenty-three years her elder, Stalin was strongly irritated by the relationship. According to Svetlana, Stalin "was irritated more than anything else by the fact that Kapler was Jewish." Kapler was sentenced to ten years of hard labor in Gulag on the charges of being an "English spy." Stalin's daughter later fell in love with Grigori Morozov, another Jew, and married him. Stalin agreed to their marriage after much pleading on Svetlana's part, but refused to attend the wedding. Stalin's son Yakov also married a Jewish woman, Yulia Meltzer, and though Stalin disapproved at first, he began to grow fond of her. Stalin's biographer Simon Sebag Montefiore wrote that Lavrenty Beria's son noted that his father could list Stalin's affairs with Jewish women.

In his memoirs, Nikita Khrushchev wrote: "A hostile attitude toward the Jewish nation was a major shortcoming of Stalin's. In his speeches and writings as a leader and theoretician there wasn't even a hint of this. God forbid that anyone assert that a statement by him smacked of antisemitism. Outwardly everything looked correct and proper. But in his inner circle, when he had occasion to speak about some Jewish person, he always used an emphatically distorted pronunciation. This was the way backward people lacking in political consciousness would express themselves in daily life—people with a contemptuous attitude toward Jews. They would deliberately mangle the Russian language, putting on a Jewish accent or imitating certain negative characteristics [attributed to Jews]. Stalin loved to do this, and it became one of his characteristic traits." Khrushchev further professed that Stalin frequently made antisemitic comments after World War II.

Analyzing various explanations for Stalin's perceived antisemitism in his book The Lesser Terror: Soviet State Security, 1939–1953, historian Michael Parrish wrote: "It has been suggested that Stalin, who remained first and foremost a Georgian throughout his life, somehow became a 'Great Russian' and decided that Jews would make a scapegoat for the ills of the Soviet Union. Others, such as the Polish writer Aleksander Wat (himself a victim), claim that Stalin was not an antisemite by nature, but the pro-Americanism of Soviet Jews forced him to follow a deliberate policy of antisemitism. Wat's views are, however, colored by the fact that Stalin, for obvious reasons, at first depended on Jewish Communists to help carry out his post-war policies in Poland. I believe a better explanation was Stalin's sense of envy, which consumed him throughout his life. He also found in Jews a convenient target. By late 1930, Stalin, as [his daughter's] memoirs indicate, was suffering from a full-blown case of antisemitism."

In Esau's Tears: Modern Anti-Semitism and the Rise of the Jews, historian Albert S. Lindemann wrote: "Determining Stalin's real attitude to Jews is difficult. Not only did he repeatedly speak out against anti-Semitism but both his son and daughter married Jews, and several of his closest and most devoted lieutenants from the late 1920s through the 1930s were of Jewish origin, for example Lazar Moiseyevich Kaganovich, Maxim Litvinov, and the notorious head of the secret police, Genrikh Yagoda. There were not so many Jews allied with Stalin on the party's right as there were allied with Trotsky on the left, but the importance of men like Kaganovich, Litvinov, and Yagoda makes it hard to believe that Stalin harbored a categorical hatred of all Jews, as a race, in the way that Hitler did. Scholars as diverse in their opinions as Isaac Deutscher and Robert Conquest have denied that anything as crude and dogmatic as Nazi-style anti-Semitism motivated Stalin. It may be enough simply to note that Stalin was a man of towering hatreds, corrosive suspicions, and impenetrable duplicity. He saw enemies everywhere, and it just so happened that many of his enemies—virtually all his enemies—were Jews, above all, the enemy, Trotsky." Lindemann added that "Jews in the party were often verbally adroit, polylingual, and broadly educated—all qualities Stalin lacked. To observe, as his daughter Svetlana has, that 'Stalin did not like Jews,' does not tell us much, since he 'did not like' any group: His hatreds and suspicions knew no limits; even party members from his native Georgia were not exempt. Whether he hated Jews with a special intensity or quality is not clear."

== See also ==
- Antisemitism in the Soviet Union
- History of the Jews in the Soviet Union
- Population transfer in the Soviet Union
- Soviet Anti-Zionism
- Soviet pro-Arab propaganda
- The Hitler Book
