= Soviet anti-Zionism =

Opposition to Zionism within the Soviet Union

Soviet anti-Zionism was an anti-Zionist and pro-Arab doctrine promulgated in the Soviet Union during the Cold War. While the Soviet Union initially pursued a pro-Zionist policy after World War II due to its perception that the Jewish state would be socialist and pro-Soviet, its outlook on the Arab–Israeli conflict changed as Israel began to develop a close relationship with the United States and aligned itself with the Western Bloc.

Anti-Israel Soviet propaganda intensified after Israel's sweeping victory in the 1967 Arab–Israeli War, and it was officially sponsored by the agitation and propaganda media of the Communist Party of the Soviet Union as well as by the KGB. Among other charges, it alleged that Zionism was a form of racism. The Soviets framed their anti-Zionist propaganda in the guise of a study of modern Zionism, dubbed Zionology. The Soviet anti-Israel policy included the regulated denial of permission for Jews in the Soviet Union to emigrate, primarily to Israel, but also to any other country.

== History ==
The official Soviet ideological position on Zionism condemned the movement as akin to bourgeois nationalism. Vladimir Lenin rejected Zionism as a reactionary movement, "bourgeois nationalism", "socially retrogressive", and a backward force that deprecates class divisions among Jews. From late 1944, however, Joseph Stalin adopted a pro-Zionist foreign policy, apparently believing that a Jewish state would emerge socialist and pro-Soviet, and thus would speed the decline of British influence in the Middle East. Accordingly, in November 1947, the Soviet Union, together with the other countries of the Eastern Bloc, voted in favour of the United Nations Partition Plan for Palestine, which would pave the way for the establishment of the State of Israel. On 17 May 1948, three days after the Israeli Declaration of Independence, the Soviet Union granted de jure recognition to Israel, becoming the second country to recognize Israel overall (preceded by the United States' granting of de facto recognition) and the first country to grant it de jure recognition. Nevertheless, Stalin soon returned to the preexisting "party line" regarding Zionism in response to Israel's growing alliance with the United States, starting an anti-Jewish campaign within the Soviet Union and the Eastern Bloc, which would culminate in the Doctors' plot, an antisemitic Soviet conspiracy theory. The Soviet press engaged in attacks on Zionism, Jewish culture, and "rootless cosmopolitanism".

In his 1969 book Beware! Zionism, Yuri Ivanov, the Soviet Union's leading Zionologist, defined modern Zionism as follows:

Modern Zionism is the ideology, a ramified system of organisations and the practical politics of the wealthy Jewish bourgeoisie which has closely allied itself with monopoly circles in the USA and other imperialist countries. The main content of Zionism is bellicose chauvinism and anti-communism.

Soviet leaders denied that their anti-Zionism was antisemitic. As proof, they pointed to the fact that several prominent Zionologists were ethnic Jews representing an expert opinion. Many—including some within the Soviet Union itself—argued that Zionology exhibited antisemitic themes. For example, in November 1975, the Soviet historian and academic M. Korostovtsev wrote a letter to the Secretary of the Central Committee of the Communist Party of the Soviet Union, Mikhail Suslov, regarding the book The Encroaching Counter Revolution by Vladimir Begun: "...it perceptibly stirs up anti-Semitism under the flag of anti-Zionism."

Some Zionology books, "exposing" Zionism and Judaism, were included in the mandatory reading list for military and police personnel, students, teachers and Communist Party members and were mass published.

The third edition of the thirty-volume Great Soviet Encyclopedia (Большая Советская энциклопедия, БСЭ), published in 1969–1978, qualifies Zionism as racism and makes the following assertions:

- "The main posits of modern Zionism are militant chauvinism, racism, anti-Communism and anti-Sovietism"
- "The anti-human reactionary essence of Zionism" is "overt and covert fight against freedom movements and against the USSR"
- "International Zionist Organization owns major financial funds, partly through Jewish monopolists and partly collected by Jewish mandatory charities", it also "influences or controls significant part of media agencies and outlets in the West"
- "Serving as the front squad of colonialism and neo-colonialism, international Zionism actively participates in the fight against national liberation movements of the peoples of Africa, Asia and Latin America"
- "A natural and objective assimilation process of Jews is growing around the world."

The official position of the Soviet Union and its satellite states and agencies was that Zionism was a tool used by the Jews and the Americans for "racist imperialism." The meaning of the term Zionism was defined by the ruling Communist Party of the Soviet Union: "the main posits of modern Zionism are militant chauvinism, racism, anti-Communism and anti-Sovietism... overt and covert fight against freedom movements and the USSR."

In his book A History of the Jews in the Modern World, Howard Sachar argues that the atmosphere of the Soviet "anti-Zionist" campaign in the wake of the Six-Day War was antisemitic, and even compares it to Nazism:

"In late July 1967, Moscow launched an unprecedented propaganda campaign against Zionism as a 'world threat.' Defeat was attributed not to tiny Israel alone, but to an 'all-powerful international force.' ... In its flagrant vulgarity, the new propaganda assault soon achieved Nazi-era characteristics. The Soviet public was saturated with racist canards. Extracts from Trofim Kichko's notorious 1963 volume, Judaism Without Embellishment, were extensively republished in the Soviet media. Yuri Ivanov's Beware: Zionism, a book essentially replicated The Protocols of the Elders of Zion, was given nationwide coverage."

A similar picture was drawn by Paul Johnson:

the mass media "all over the Soviet Union portrayed the Zionists (i.e. Jews) and Israeli leaders as engaged in a world-wide conspiracy along the lines of the old Protocols of Zion. It was, Sovietskaya Latvia wrote 5 August 1967, an 'international Cosa Nostra with a common centre, common programme and common funds'".

The Israeli government was also referred to as a "terrorist regime" which "has raised terror to the level of state politics." Even regarding the Entebbe hostage crisis, Soviet media reported: "Israel committed an act of aggression against Uganda, assaulting the Entebbe airport."

Paul Johnson and other historians have also argued that United Nations General Assembly Resolution 3379 of 10 November 1975 that equated "Zionism" with "racism" was orchestrated by the Soviet Union. Resolution 3379 was pioneered by the Soviet Union and passed with numerical support from Arab, Muslim and African states amidst accusations that Israel was supportive of the apartheid regime in South Africa. Prior to the vote, US representative at the UN, Daniel Patrick Moynihan, warned of the impact of thus resolution, stating "The UN is about to make antisemitism an international law." Though ten days before the Dissolution of the Soviet Union, Soviet sponsored United Nations General Assembly Resolution 46/86 was adopted on 16 December 1991 which revoked the determination in Resolution 3379.

On 1 April 1983, official newspaper of the Communist Party of the Soviet Union, Pravda, ran a full front-page article titled From the Soviet Leadership:

"By its nature, Zionism concentrates ultra-nationalism, chauvinism and racial intolerance, excuse for territorial occupation and annexation, military opportunism, cult of political promiscuousness and irresponsibility, demagogy and ideological diversion, dirty tactics and perfidy... Absurd are attempts of Zionist ideologists to present criticizing them, or condemning the aggressive politics of the Israel's ruling circles, as antisemitic... We call on all Soviet citizens: workers, peasants, representatives of intelligentsia: take active part in exposing Zionism, strongly rebuke its endeavors; social scientists: activate scientific research to criticize reactionary core of that ideology and aggressive character of its political practice; writers, artists, journalists: fuller expose anti-populace and anti-humane diversionary character of propaganda and politics of Zionism."

Also, at the same time, the CPSU set up the Anti-Zionist Committee of the Soviet Public as an anti-Zionist propaganda tool.

In March 1985 Mikhail Gorbachev became the Secretary General of the CPSU and in April he declared perestroika. It took more than six years before Moscow consented to restore diplomatic relations with Israel on 19 October 1991, just 2 months before the collapse of the USSR and ten days before the Dissolution of the Soviet Union. The Soviet Union was one of the sponsors of United Nations General Assembly Resolution 46/86 which was adopted on 16 December 1991 and revoked Resolution 3379 that had called Zionism a form of racism.

== See also ==
- Antisemitism in Russia
- Antisemitism in the Soviet Union
- Soviet Union and the Arab–Israeli conflict
- Soviet pro-Arab propaganda
- Anti-Zionist Committee of the Soviet Public
- History of the Jews in Russia
- History of the Jews in the Soviet Union
- Izabella Tabarovsky
- Racism in the Soviet Union
- Refusenik
- Jackson–Vanik amendment
- Rootless cosmopolitan
- Doctors' plot
- Slánský trial
- Joseph Stalin and antisemitism
