= Kennan Institute =

American institute for Russian and Soviet studies

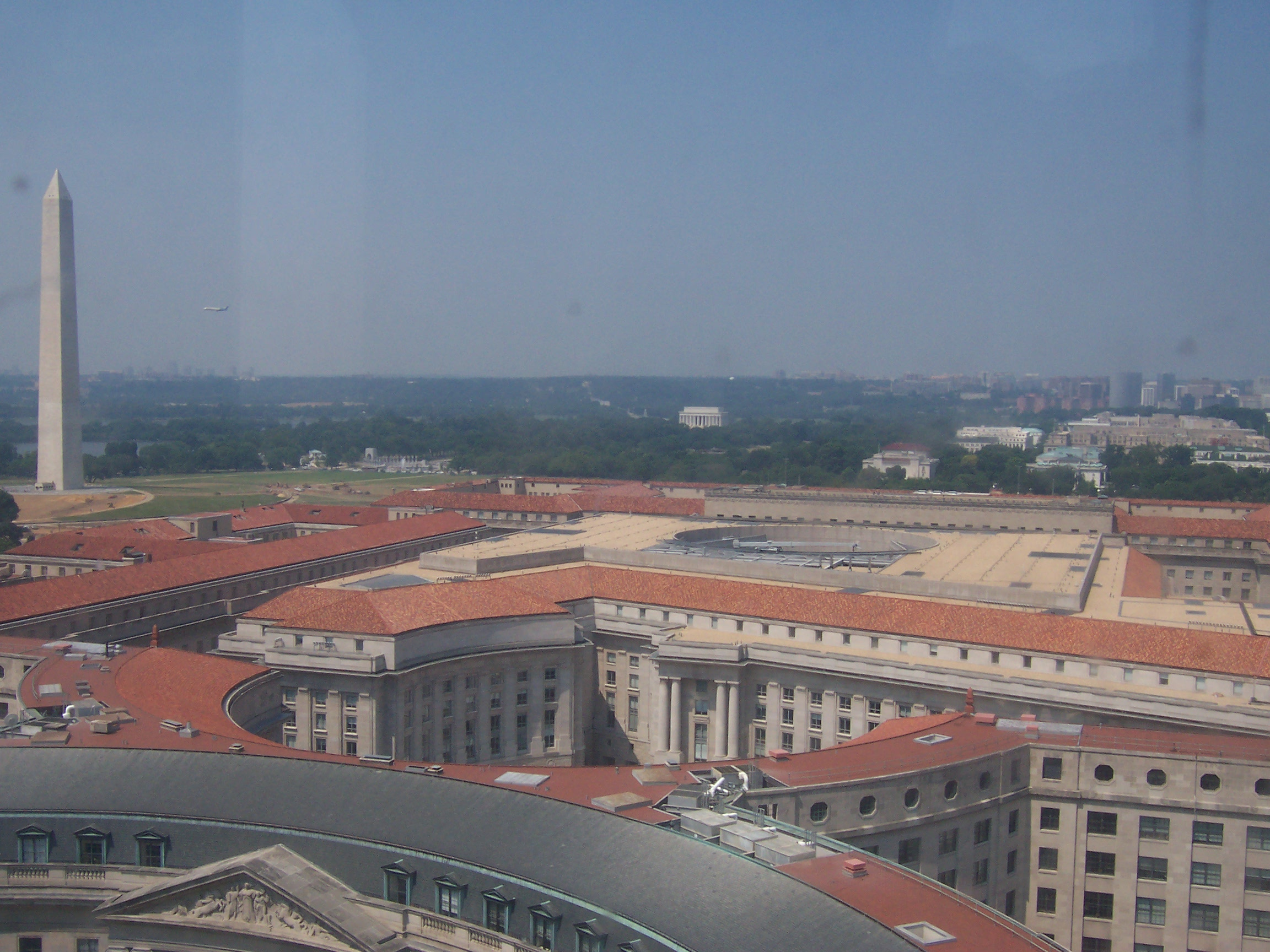
The Kennan Institute and the Ronald Reagan Building are in the middle of the image

The Kennan Institute was founded in 1974 to carry out studies of the Soviet Union (Sovietology), and subsequently of post-Soviet Russia and other post-Soviet states. The institute is widely regarded as the foremost institute studying Russia in the United States.

The institute is named after George Kennan, a 19th-century American explorer of Russia and Siberia, who was a much older cousin of the eminent American diplomat George F. Kennan. Ambassador Kennan was best known as the author of the U.S. containment policy toward the Soviet Union during the Cold War. Together with Wilson Center Director James Billington and historian S. Frederick Starr, he initiated the establishment of the Kennan Institute at the Woodrow Wilson Center.

In 2025, in response to the closure of most programs of the Woodrow Wilson Center by the Trump administration, the Kennan Institute declared itself an independent non-profit, transferring its collections and endowment out of the Wilson Center's control.

In addition to its office in Washington, the Kennan Institute operates an office in Kyiv, Ukraine. Kennan's Kyiv office provides on-the-ground assistance to the Washington staff and a communication link with various Ukrainian organizations. The office also organizes publications, seminars, and conferences on major events of the day featuring Kennan Institute alumni.

== Activities ==
The institute offers residential scholarships in the humanities and social sciences to academic scholars and specialists from government, the media, and the private sectors. Thanks to its location in Washington, D.C., scholars at the Kennan Institute have access to libraries, archives, research facilities, and human resources that are among the finest in the world.

The institute also administers an active program of public lectures and conferences featuring scholars and public figures from the United States, Ukraine, Russia, and other states from the region. The institute makes the results of its activities known through a variety of publications including Meeting Reports, Occasional Papers, Special Reports, and commercially published books.

=== Research areas ===
Most recent research topics include:

- Religion in Post-Soviet Societies
- Migration in the Post-Soviet space

== Cooperation ==
The Kennan Institute is a partner of the Russian and Eurasian Security Specialized Network (RES) of the international Center for Security Studies (CSS), ETH Zurich, Zurich, Switzerland.

The Kennan Institute cooperated with the ISE Center (Information. Scholarship. Education.), Moscow, in administering the Centers for Advanced Study and Education (CASE) program. The CASE program, launched with support from Carnegie Corporation of New York and the John D. and Catherine T. MacArthur Foundation, established nine thematic research centers at regional Russian universities in order to foster scholarship in the social sciences and humanities.

== See also ==
- Izabella Tabarovsky
