= Lenin's Testament =

Document dictated by Vladimir Lenin on his deathbed

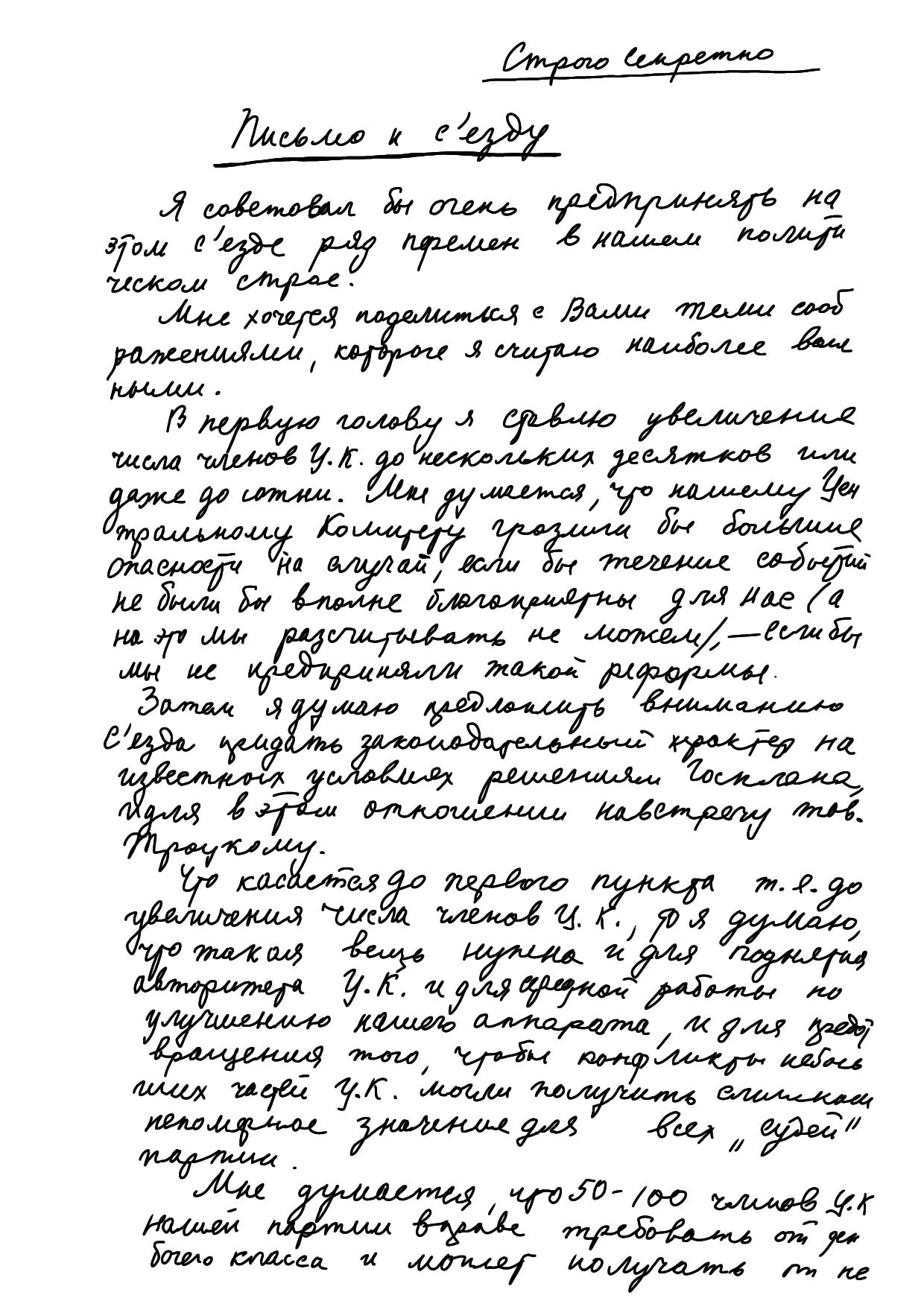

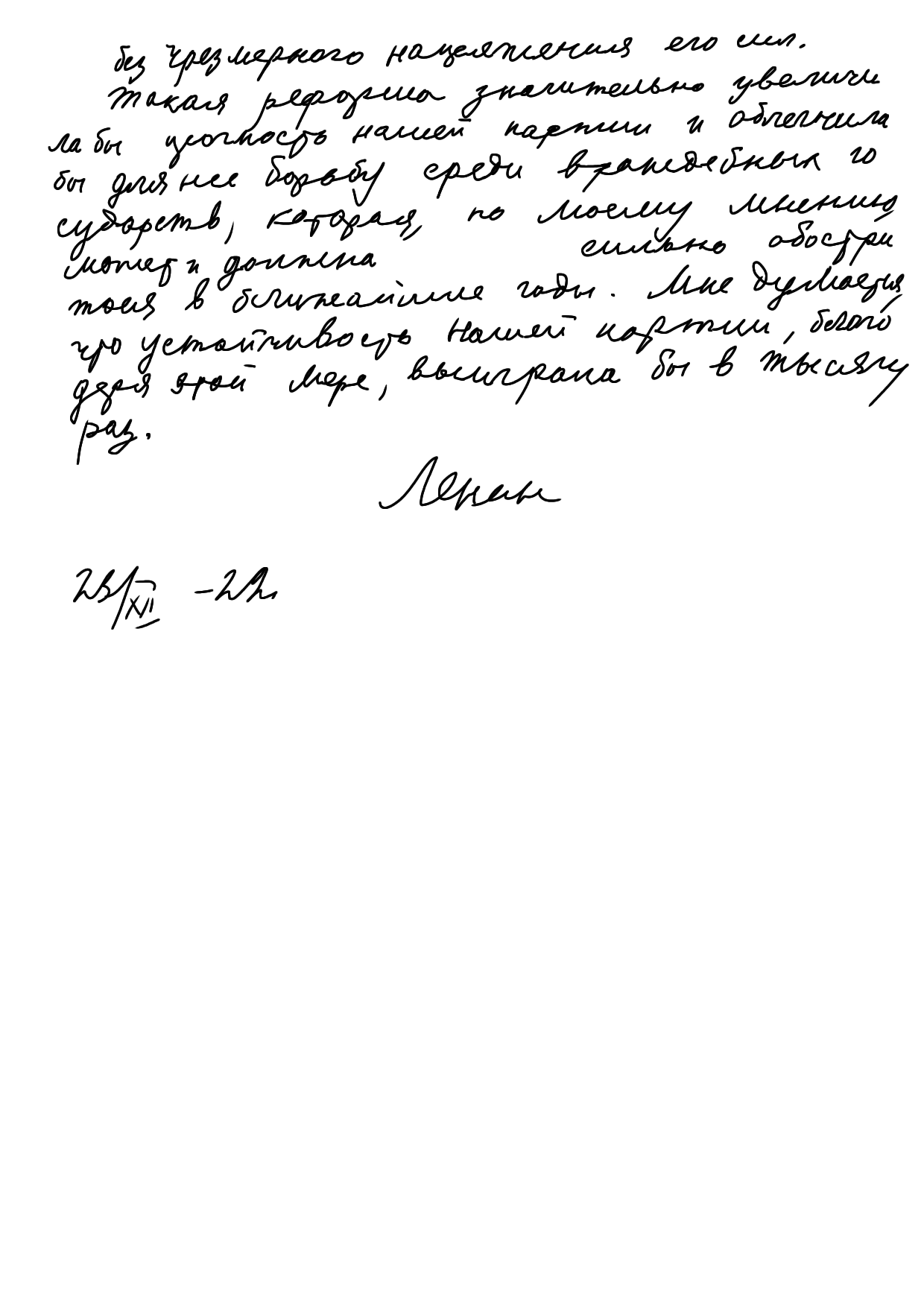
- Dated December 23, 1922
- Created: 1922–1923
- Presented: January 1924
- Author: Vladimir Lenin
- Subject: Future leadership of the Soviet Union

Lenin's Testament (Russian: Письмо к съезду, romanized: Pismo k sezdu, lit. 'Letter to the Congress') is a document dictated by Vladimir Lenin in late 1922 and early 1923, during and after his suffering of multiple strokes. In the testament, Lenin proposed changes to the structure of the Soviet governing bodies; sensing his impending death, he also criticised Bolshevik leaders Zinoviev, Kamenev, Trotsky, Bukharin, Pyatakov, and crucially Stalin. He warned of the possibility of a split developing in the party leadership between Trotsky and Stalin if proper measures were not taken to prevent it. In a post-script it is also suggested Joseph Stalin be removed from his position as General Secretary of the Russian Communist Party's Central Committee; Stalin suppressed the document.

Although there are some historical questions regarding the document's origins and authenticity, the majority view is that the document was authored by Lenin.

== Background ==
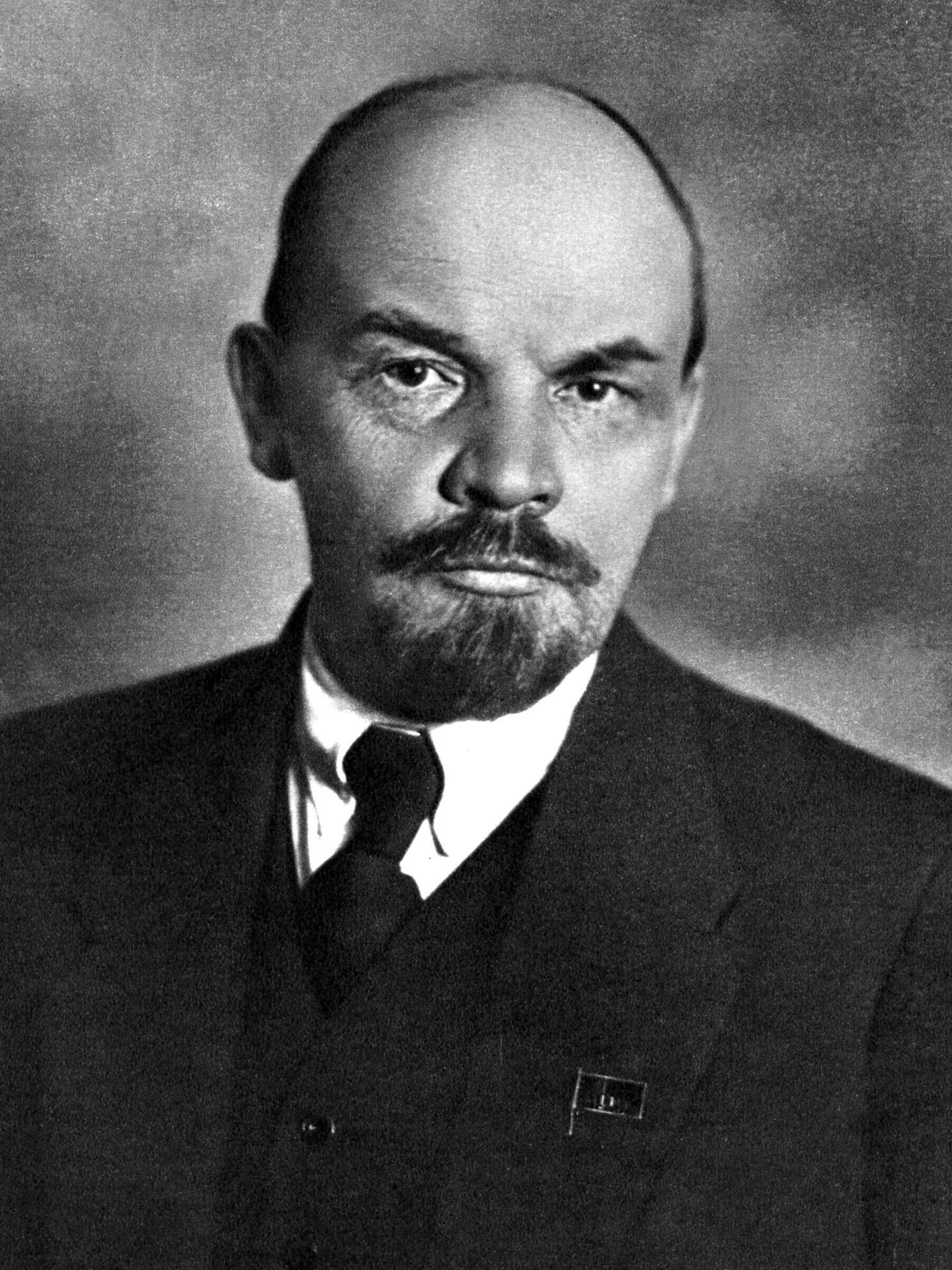
Lenin in 1920

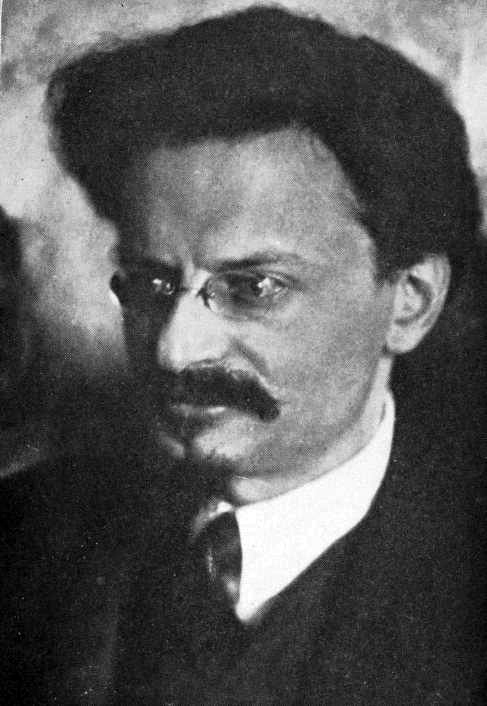
Lenin and Trotsky (both photographed in 1920) were viewed as the leading figures in the first Soviet government

Lenin was seriously ill by the latter half of 1921, experiencing hyperacusis, insomnia, and regular headaches. At the Politburo's insistence, in July he left Moscow for a month's leave at his Gorki mansion, where he was cared for by his wife, Nadezhda Krupskaya, and sister. Lenin began to contemplate the possibility of suicide, asking both Krupskaya and Stalin to acquire potassium cyanide for him. Twenty-six physicians were hired to help Lenin during his final years; many of them were foreign and had been hired at great expense. Some suggested that his sickness could have been caused by metal oxidation from the bullets that were lodged in his body from the 1918 assassination attempt; in April 1922 he underwent a surgical operation to remove them. The symptoms continued after this, with Lenin's doctors unsure of the cause; some suggested that he had neurasthenia or cerebral arteriosclerosis. In May 1922, he had his first stroke, temporarily losing his ability to speak and being paralysed on his right side. He convalesced at Gorki, and had largely recovered by July. In October, he returned to Moscow; in December, he had a second stroke and returned to Gorki.

In Lenin's absence, Stalin had begun consolidating his power both by appointing his supporters to prominent positions, and by cultivating an image of himself as Lenin's closest intimate and deserving successor. In December 1922, Stalin took responsibility for Lenin's regimen, being tasked by the Politburo with controlling who had access to him.

Lenin was increasingly critical of Stalin; while Lenin was insisting that the state should retain its monopoly on international trade during mid-1922, Stalin was leading other Bolsheviks in unsuccessfully opposing this. There were personal arguments between the two as well; Stalin had upset Krupskaya by shouting at her during a phone conversation, which in turn greatly angered Lenin, who sent Stalin a letter expressing his annoyance.

Lenin also threatened to break relations with Stalin in a letter, written in March 1923, after learning of his rudeness towards his wife. Lenin had also expressed strong criticism of the People's Commissariat of the Workers' and Peasants' Inspection (or Rabkrin) which had been overseen by Stalin from 1920 until 1922. He stated: "Everybody knows that no other institutions are worse organised than those of our Workers’ and Peasants’ Inspection, and that under present conditions nothing can be expected from this People's Commissariat". Trotsky had also attempted to publish Lenin's criticisms of the Rabkrin for several weeks but the Politburo, under the control of the triumvirate, refused.

Conversely, Lenin expressed hostility to the initial attempts by the triumvirate to remove Trotsky from the leadership. In a 1922 memo written to Kamenev, he chastised the efforts by the Central Committee to "throw Trotsky overboard" as the "height of stupidity. If you do not consider me already hopelessly foolish, how can you think of that?".

Various historians have cited Lenin's proposal to appoint Trotsky as a Vice-chairman of Soviet of People's Comissaries of the Soviet Union as evidence that he intended Trotsky to be his successor as head of government. He had been expected to assume responsibility over the Council of National Economy or Gosplan. Prior to the introduction of the factional ban in 1921, due to intra-party controversies and the wider conflict of the Civil War, Trotsky had a considerable following among the party activists and members of the Central Committee against the narrow majority supporting Lenin. His supporters also controlled the newly established Orgburo and the Party Secretariat before the appointment of Stalin as General Secretary. According to historian Sheila Fitzpatrick, Trotsky would have been the likely successor to Lenin had he assumed the position of first deputy at Sovnarkom and this position would have given him an institutional base against Stalin's base in the party.

In 1922, Lenin allied with Leon Trotsky against the party's growing bureaucratisation and the influence of Joseph Stalin. All evidence suggests that Lenin spent the winter of 1923 preparing to launch an attack on Stalin during the Twelfth Party Congress and had approached Trotsky to take on responsibility for the Georgian Affair. Lenin had also encouraged Trotsky in his absence to challenge Stalin at the Twelfth Party Congress over his methods in managing Georgian Bolsheviks.

During December 1922 and January 1923, Lenin dictated "Lenin's Testament", in which he discussed the personal qualities of his comrades, particularly Trotsky and Stalin. An early, typed version of the testament, which was based on the shorthand notes, was burned by Lenin's secretary, Mariya Volodicheva on the orders of Stalin. However, four other copies of the testament were stored in a safe.

== Document history and authenticity ==
Lenin wanted the testament to be read out at the 12th Party Congress of the Communist Party of the Soviet Union, to be held in April 1923. The document was originally dictated to Lenin's personal secretary, Lydia Fotiyeva. However, after Lenin's third stroke in March 1923 that left him paralyzed and unable to speak, the testament was kept secret by his wife, Nadezhda Krupskaya, in the hope of Lenin's eventual recovery. She possessed four copies while Maria Ulyanova, Lenin's sister, had one. It was only after Lenin's death, on January 21, 1924, that she turned the document over to the Communist Party Central Committee Secretariat and asked for it to be made available to the delegates of the 13th Party Congress in May 1924.

The text of the testament and the fact of its concealment soon became known in the West, especially after the circumstances surrounding the controversy were described by Max Eastman in Since Lenin Died (1925). The full English text of Lenin's testament was published as part of an article by Eastman that appeared in The New York Times in 1926. In response to Eastman's article, Trotsky described the claim that the Central Committee concealed the testament as "pure slander". Trotsky also rejected the characterization of the document as a "will", describing the document as one of Lenin's letters providing advice on organizational matters. Trotsky would later explain his decision during the Dewey Commission hearing in 1937, in which he stated that Eastman had made the publication without his consent and pressure from the majority of the Politburo members had led him to disavow Eastman's publication.

Historian Stephen Kotkin argued that the evidence for Lenin's authorship of the Testament is weak and suggested that the Testament could have been created by Krupskaya. However, the Testament has been accepted as genuine by other historians, including E. H. Carr, Isaac Deutscher, Dmitri Volkogonov, Vadim Rogovin and Oleg Khlevniuk, and Kotkin's argument was specifically rejected by Richard Pipes. Moshe Lewin cited the document as a representation of Lenin's views and argued that “the Soviet regime underwent a long period of “Stalinism”, which in its basic features was diametrically opposed to the recommendations of the testament”.

Historian Ronald Suny wrote that Kotkin's hypothesis lacked mainstream support in a review:

"Few other scholars doubt the authorship of the document, which accurately reflected Lenin’s views, nor was it questioned at the time it was written and debated in high party circles. Kotkin’s interpretation, fascinating as it is, relies on conjecture rather than evidence".

A number of modern Russian historians, most notably Valentin Sakharov author of the book “Political testament” of V. I. Lenin" express doubts about the authorship of Lenin, affirming that Krupskaya or even Leon Trotsky could be the true author of the letter, a view which is shared by historians Vladimir Ermakov and Yuri Zhukov.

Conversely, historian Mark Edele was critical of this hypothesis and argued that Kotkin "went as far as embracing the empirically shaky thesis that Lenin’s 'Testament' was a forgery. As one of his critics pointed out, this discredited position is otherwise embraced only by Russian neo-Stalinists".

Historian Hiroaki Kuromiya has attributed claims of a forgery to Russian historian Valentin Sakharov who argued that Lenin's entourage had forged some of the documents to discredit Stalin. However, Kuromiya stated that Sakharov's claim had "generated much controversy and little consensus".

Sakharov set out his case in a 736-page monograph published by Moscow University Press in 2003. According to the economic historian Andrei Belykh, Sakharov's work influenced foreign scholars, among them Kotkin. Sakharov agreed with most Western scholars that the document consisted of Lenin's characterizations of six possible successors, dictated on the night of December 24–25, 1922, and an addendum of January 4, 1923. He argued, however, that it could not have been written before the 12th Party Congress in April 1923, and that its author was not Lenin but a person or group who sought to remove Stalin and advance Trotsky. He held that the text survived only as a copy made by Trotsky from a lost document. He also dated the conflict between Stalin and Krupskaya to early 1923, after the supposed date of the addendum. Sakharov wrote that none of the anti-Stalin texts bore Lenin's signature or a certifying note, and he treated all of them as falsifications, including the second and third parts of the "Letter to the Congress". In a review of the book, Alexis Pogorelskin cited Roy Medvedev's finding that Volodicheva had typed five copies of Lenin's characterizations. Pogorelskin also noted that none of the leaders criticized in the document challenged its authenticity, and that it became the basis on which the United Opposition formed in 1926. Belykh endorsed the view of Oleg Khlevniuk, who called the forgery thesis a conspiracy theory and argued that the lack of doubt among Lenin's associates, Stalin included, was the key proof that the dictations were genuine. Belykh added that a forgery would have required accomplices in Lenin's small circle, whose secretaries included Stalin's wife, Nadezhda Alliluyeva. He also argued that Trotsky's supporters would not have written about Trotsky's "non-Bolshevism", a description that Stalin later used against him.

Historian Peter Kenez believed that Trotsky could probably have removed Stalin with the use of Lenin's testament but he acquiesced to the collective decision not to publish the document.

Historian Geoffrey Roberts stated that none of the Soviet figures questioned the authenticity of the document at the time. He noted that Stalin himself quoted the full passage of the testament and commented that "Indeed I am rude, Comrades, to those who rudely and perfidiously destroy and split the party. I have not hidden this, and still do not". Similarly, historian Roman Brackman stated that Krupskaya circulated copies of Lenin's testament to all the Politburo members and noted that Stalin upon reading the Lenin's testament had "exploded with obscene swearing at Lenin in the presence of Kamenev and Zinoviev". Historian Vadim Rogovin cited a letter written by Grigori Zinoviev between July and August 1923 which referenced Lenin's characterization of Stalin in the testament as "a thousand times correct". Rogovin also cited a published correspondence from Zinoviev and Bukharin which was addressed to Stalin and stated, "there exists a letter by V.I., in which he advised (the Twelfth Party Congress) not to elect you Secretary". According to Stalin's secretary, Boris Bazhanov, Lenin "in general leaned towards a collegial leadership, with Trotsky in the first position". Old Bolshevik and historian, Vladimir Nevsky, believed that Stalin was appointed the General Secretary because he used false rumors to convince Lenin that the party faced a split. Nevsky also claimed that Lenin would later deeply regret trusting Stalin and strove to correct this mistake with his "Testament". According to Kuromiya, Stalin pleaded with the People's Commissar for Finance, Grigory Sokolnikov, not to discuss Lenin's testament at the 15th party Congress.

=== Related documents ===
This term is not to be confused with "Lenin's Political Testament", a term used in Leninism to refer to a set of letters and articles dictated by Lenin during his illness on how to continue the construction of the Soviet state. Traditionally, it includes the following works:

- A Letter to a Congress, "Письмо к съезду"
- About Assigning of Legislative Functions to Gosplan, "О придании законодательных функций Госплану"
- To the "Nationalities Issue" or about "Autonomization", "К 'вопросу о национальностях' или об 'автономизации' "
- Pages from the Diary, "Странички из дневника"
- About Cooperation, "О кооперации"
- About Our Revolution, "О нашей революции"
- How shall We Reorganise the Rabkrin, "Как нам реорганизовать Рабкрин"
- Better Less but Better, "Лучше меньше, да лучше"

== Contents ==
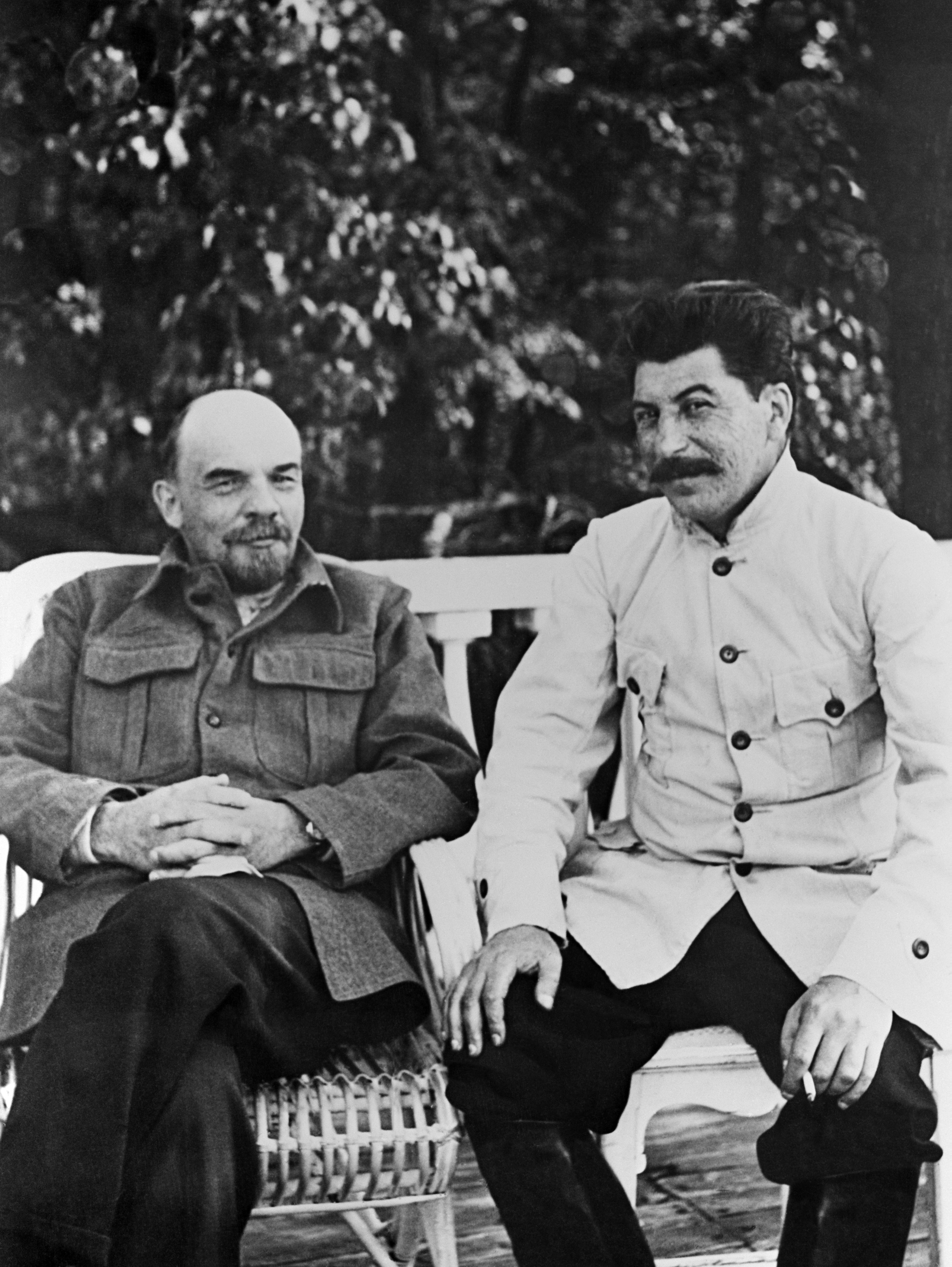
Lenin and Stalin at Gorki, 1922. Stalin attempted to use photos like this to show his closeness to Lenin, however, not long after this photo was taken Lenin fell out with Stalin and wrote his testament against him

The letter is a critique of the Soviet government as it then stood. It warned of dangers that he anticipated and made suggestions for the future. Some of those suggestions included increasing the size of the Party's Central Committee, giving the State Planning Committee legislative powers and changing the nationalities policy, which had been implemented by Stalin.

Stalin and Trotsky were criticised:

Comrade Stalin, having become Secretary-General, has unlimited authority concentrated in his hands, and I am not sure whether he will always be capable of using that authority with sufficient caution. Comrade Trotsky, on the other hand, as his struggle against the C.C. on the question of the People's Commissariat of Communications has already proved, is distinguished not only by outstanding ability. He is personally perhaps the most capable man in the present C.C., but he has displayed excessive self-assurance and shown excessive preoccupation with the purely administrative side of the work. These two qualities of the two outstanding leaders of the present C.C. can inadvertently lead to a split, and if our Party does not take steps to avert this, the split may come unexpectedly.

Lenin felt that Stalin had more power than he could handle and might be dangerous if he was Lenin's successor. In a postscript written a few weeks later, Lenin recommended Stalin's removal from the position of General Secretary of the Party:

Stalin is too coarse and this defect, although quite tolerable in our midst and in dealing among us Communists, becomes intolerable in a Secretary-General. That is why I suggest that the comrades think about a way of removing Stalin from that post and appointing another man in his stead who in all other respects differs from Comrade Stalin in having only one advantage, namely, that of being more tolerant, more loyal, more polite and more considerate to the comrades, less capricious, etc. This circumstance may appear to be a negligible detail. But I think that from the standpoint of safeguards against a split and from the standpoint of what I wrote above about the relationship between Stalin and Trotsky it is not a [minor] detail, but it is a detail which can assume decisive importance.

Marxist historian Ludo Martens argues that the postscript's complaints about Stalin's coarseness refers to a rebuke that Stalin had made to Krupskaya twelve days earlier.

By power, Trotsky argued Lenin meant administrative power, rather than political influence, within the party. Trotsky pointed out that Lenin had effectively accused Stalin of a lack of loyalty.

In the 30 December 1922 article, Nationalities Issue, Lenin criticized the actions of Felix Dzerzhinsky, Grigoriy Ordzhonikidze and Stalin in the Georgian Affair by accusing them of "Great Russian Chauvinism".

I think that a fatal role was played here by hurry and the administrative impetuousness of Stalin and also his infatuation with the renowned "social-nationalism". Infatuation in politics generally and usually plays the worst role.

Lenin also criticised other Politburo members:

[T]he October episode with Zinoviev and Kamenev [their opposition to seizing power in October 1917] was, of course, no accident, but neither can the blame for it be laid upon them personally, any more than non-Bolshevism can upon Trotsky.

Finally, he criticised two younger Bolshevik leaders, Bukharin and Pyatakov:

They are, in my opinion, the most outstanding figures (among the younger ones), and the following must be borne in mind about them: Bukharin is not only a most valuable and major theorist of the Party; he is also rightly considered the favorite of the whole Party, but his theoretical views can be classified as fully Marxist only with the great reserve, for there is something scholastic about him (he has never made a study of dialectics, and, I think, never fully appreciated it).

As for Pyatakov, he is unquestionably a man of outstanding will and outstanding ability, but shows far too much zeal for administrating and the administrative side of the work to be relied upon in a serious political matter.

Both of these remarks, of course, are made only for the present, on the assumption that both these outstanding and devoted Party workers fail to find an occasion to enhance their knowledge and amend their one-sidedness.

Isaac Deutscher, a biographer of both Trotsky and Stalin, wrote that "the whole testament breathed uncertainty".

== Political impact and repercussions ==
=== Short term ===
Lenin's testament presented the ruling triumvirate or troika (Joseph Stalin, Grigory Zinoviev, and Lev Kamenev) with an uncomfortable dilemma. On the one hand, they would have preferred to suppress the testament since it was critical of all three of them as well as of their ally Nikolai Bukharin and their opponents, Leon Trotsky and Georgy Pyatakov. Although Lenin's comments were damaging to all of the communist leaders, Joseph Stalin stood to lose the most since the only practical suggestion in the testament was to remove him from the position of the General Secretary of the Party's Central Committee.

On the other hand, the leadership dared not go directly against Lenin's wishes so soon after his death, especially with his widow insisting on having them carried out. The leadership was also in the middle of a factional struggle over the control of the Party, the ruling faction being loosely allied groups that would soon part ways, which would have made a coverup difficult.

The final compromise proposed by the triumvirate at the Council of the Elders of the 13th Congress after Kamenev read out the text of the document was to make Lenin's testament available to the delegates on the following conditions (first made public in a pamphlet by Trotsky published in 1934 and confirmed by documents released during and after glasnost):

- The testament would be read by representatives of the party leadership to each regional delegation separately.
- Taking notes would not be allowed.
- The testament would not be referred to during the plenary meeting of the Congress.

The proposal was adopted by a majority vote, over Krupskaya's objections. As a result, the testament did not have the effect that Lenin had hoped for, and Stalin retained his position as General Secretary, with the notable help of Aleksandr Petrovich Smirnov, then People's Commissar of Agriculture.

According to Rogovin, Lenin's proposals for party reform such the elevation of the Central Control Commission and Rabkrin were significantly watered down. Rogovin stated that the membership of the Central Committee increased by nearly ten times but two-thirds of those elected to Congress were local officials subject to party and state control.

Stalin later stated that he had offered to resign as General Secretary after the Congress. In a speech to a joint plenum of the Central Committee and the Central Control Commission on October 23, 1927, he recalled:

At the very first meeting of the plenum of the Central Committee after the Thirteenth Congress I asked the plenum of the Central Committee to release me from my duties as General Secretary. The congress itself discussed this question. It was discussed by each delegation separately, and all the delegations unanimously, including Trotsky, Kamenev and Zinoviev, obliged Stalin to remain at his post.

He added that a year later he had again asked to be released, "but I was again obliged to remain at my post".

Economic historian Andrei Belykh noted that Lenin's proposal to enlarge the party's leading bodies was formally implemented. The Central Committee grew from 27 members elected at the 11th Congress to 40 at the 12th, 53 at the 13th, 63 at the 14th and 71 at the 15th, while the Central Control Commission grew from 5 to 50, 151, 163 and 195 members. However, Belykh argued that it was "not a given" that this growth was a consequence of Lenin's articles and wrote that "rather, it may have been Parkinson's law at work". He considered there was "no doubt" that the merger of the Central Control Commission with Rabkrin, both headed by Valerian Kuybyshev from the spring of 1923, took place under their influence, but stated that control over the Politburo by the Central Committee and the commission was never established. Kuybyshev himself became a member of the Politburo in 1926 after leaving the commission, which ceased to exist in 1934. Belykh concluded that Lenin's attempt to organize democratic procedures within the party was doomed to fail, since "real democracy in a ruling party can exist only where the country has democracy, a multi-party system, a free press and independent courts".

=== Long term ===
Failure to make the document more widely available within the party remained a point of contention during the struggle between the Left Opposition and the Stalin-Bukharin faction in 1924 to 1927. Under pressure from the opposition, Stalin had to read the testament again at the July 1926 Central Committee meeting. In his October 1927 speech, Stalin added that a plenum of the Central Committee and the Central Control Commission had decided in 1926 "to ask the Fifteenth Congress for permission to publish this document".

Lenin's concerns over Stalin's harsh leadership and over a split between Trotsky and Stalin were later confirmed, with Trotsky being expelled from the Soviet Union by the Politburo in February 1929. He spent the rest of his life in exile, writing prolifically and engaging in open critique of Stalinism. In his later autobiography, My Life, Trotsky would view Lenin's "testament" as reflective of his wider struggle against the bureaucratization of the party. He also maintained that Lenin had intended for him to be his successor as Chairman of Sovnarkom of the Soviet Union with his proposed appointment as deputy chairman. He explained that this process would have begun after their alliance in 1923 with the formation of a commission to mitigate the growth of the state bureaucracy. Trotsky maintained that this action would have facilitated the conditions for his succession in the party. In February 1940, Trotsky would write his own "Testament" modelled on Lenin's, shortly before his assassination, in which he reiterated his belief in a communist future of mankind and that his personal honour among thousands of other purged victims would be rehabilitated by a "new revolutionary generation".

In 1938 Trotsky and his supporters founded the Fourth International in opposition to Stalin's Comintern. After surviving multiple attempts on his life, Trotsky was assassinated in August 1940 in Mexico City by Ramón Mercader, an agent of the Soviet NKVD. Written out of Soviet history books under Stalin, Trotsky was one of the few rivals of Stalin to not be rehabilitated by either Nikita Khrushchev or Mikhail Gorbachev. Trotsky's rehabilitation came in June 2001 by the Russian Federation.

From the time that Stalin consolidated his position as the unquestioned leader of the Communist Party and the Soviet Union, in the late 1920s, all references to Lenin's testament were considered anti-Soviet agitation and punishable as such. The denial of the existence of Lenin's testament remained one of the cornerstones of historiography in the Soviet Union until Stalin's death on March 5, 1953.

The document was mentioned in Nikita Khrushchev's 1956 speech, 'On the Cult of Personality and Its Consequences', at the 20th Congress of the Communist Party. Following this mention it was finally released to the public. The "Letter to the Congress" was first published in the Soviet Union in the party journal Kommunist (No. 9, 1956). In the "secret speech", Khrushchev utilized the document in an attempt strengthen his criticisms of Stalin's legitimacy and pursue the policy of De-Stalinization announced at the same Congress. Specifically, Khrushchev referenced the document due to the significant authority of Lenin within the party, therefore aiming to strengthen his denunciation of Stalin by appealing to the opinion of this beloved figure.
