= Alexander Poskrebyshev =

Soviet politician

- Александр Поскрёбышев
- Poskrebyshev and two daughters, Natasha (right) and Galya (left), 1940

Head of the Special Section of the Central Committee
- In office 22 July 1930 – 15 August 1952
- Preceded by: Ivan Tovstukha
- Succeeded by: Dmitri Sukhanov

Personal details
- Born: Alexander Nikolaevich Poskrebyshev; 7 August 1891 Uspenskoye, Russian Empire
- Died: 3 January 1965 (aged 73) Moscow, Soviet Union
- Party: Communist Party of the Soviet Union (1917–1956)
- Spouse(s): Stankevich Jadwiga Ippolitovna (1919–1929); Metallikova-Poskrebysheva Bronislava Solomonovna (1934–1941)
- Children: Galina Egorova-Poskryobysheva (1932–2005); Natalia Po (1938–2006); Elena Poskrebysheva (1942–2017)

Military service
- Allegiance: Red Army
- Rank: Major-General

Alexander Nikolaevich Poskrebyshev (Russian: Александр Николаевич Поскрёбышев; 7 August 1891 – 3 January 1965) was a Soviet politician and a state and Communist Party functionary. A member of the Communist Party of the Soviet Union since March 1917, he was chief of the special department of the Central Committee of the Communist Party (personal chancellery of Joseph Stalin, 1928–1953).

== Early life ==
Poskrebyshev was born on 7 August 1891, in the village of Uspenskoe near the city of Vyatka in the Russian Empire, the son of a shoemaker. His mother was Nadezhda Efimovna. He had one brother, Ivan, and two sisters, Olga and Alexandra. He studied to become a medical assistant, graduating in 1918.

== Political career ==
Poskrebyshev was involved at an early stage in the activities of the Communist Party. He was elected secretary of the local division of the Bolshevik party (1917–1918) soon after joining the Russian Social Democratic Labour Party (Bolsheviks) (RSDLP(b), March 1917). He was a member of the political committee of the Special Turkestan Army (1918–1919), chairman of the regional Military Revolutionary Committee and regional Council of Workers and Peasants Deputies (Zlatoust, 1919–1921) and worked for the Bolshevik party in Ufa (1921–1922). He moved to Moscow in 1922 within the Central Committee of the CPSU and by 1923 he had become Director of the Administrative Bureau of the Committee.

From 1924 on he worked with Stalin, when he was assigned to the Kremlin. He became an administrator in the Secret Section of the Central Committee shortly thereafter, which would later become the Special Section. Between 1924 and 1929 he was a Manager of the office of General Secretary of Central Committee of Communist Party of the Soviet Union (CPSU).

In 1927 Poskrebyshev graduated in Law and Economics from the Department of Administration and Law of Moscow State University.

In May 1929, Poskrebyshev became a Deputy of Ivan Tovstukha, Chief of the Secret Section of the Central Committee of the CPSU. On July 22, 1930, Poskrebyshev was promoted to Chief of the Secret Section. In 1934 the Secret Section was reorganized as the Special Section of the Central Committee, and on March 10, 1934, Poskrebyshev became the Chief of the Special Section.

In 1934, Poskrebyshev was elected a candidate member of the Central Committee at the 17th Congress of the CPSU. At the next two Congresses, he was made a full member.

In 1935 Poskrebyshev became the Director of Administration of the General Secretary of Central Committee of CPSU, replacing Ivan Tovstukha, who died of tuberculosis.

On the basis of Stalin's short thesis, Poskrebyshev wrote texts called "the Constitution of Soviet Union" (1936) and "Short course of CPSU history" (1938).

Since 1938 he was elected as a delegate to the first, and later of the second (1946) and third (1952) Supreme Soviet of the USSR.

He stayed in Moscow, working with Stalin, during the Second World War. Poskrebyshev was involved in the support of the planning of military operations. He prepared documents for the Tehran, Yalta and Potsdam conferences, and participated in their logistical work.

After the Second World War, Poskrebyshev participated in the collective effort to rebuild of the economy of the Soviet Union.

The apex of Poskrebyshev's political career came in 1952, when he was appointed Secretary of the Presidium of the Central Committee, thereby gaining a seat in the Politburo. At the 19th Party Congress that year, Poskrebyshev was a keynote speaker, and he headed the Secretariat of the Congress. However, a few months later Lavrentiy Beria accused Poskrebyshev of losing secret documents, and he was removed from the position by Stalin. Although these documents were later found, Poskrebyshev was not reinstated in this position due to Stalin's death.

He was briefly reinstated after the death of Stalin, but his removal from this position at the end of 1952 essentially marked the end of Poskrebyshev's political career.

== Special Section ==
Poskrebyshev's most notable office was that of Chief of the Secret/Special Section of the Central Committee, to which he was promoted in 1930. The scope of work of the Secret/Special Section of Central Committee of Communist Party was the coordination of the work of Political Bureau (Presidium, Politburo) of Central Committee, Secretariat of Central Committee, Organizational Bureau of Central Committee and Encryption Bureau.

The staff of the Secret/Special Section included Chief of Special Section, Deputy Chief of Special Section and Office manager, Deputies of members of Secretariat of Central Committee with their office administrations, Office Administrations of Political Bureau (Presidium, Politburo) of Central Committee, of Orgburo, Encryption Bureau, Archive, Registration Office. The number of staff members of Secret/Special Section grew during the time and exceeded 100 persons.

The primary work of the Secret/Special Section was management of Communist Party and Soviet Union documents including top secret documents, preparation of documents for Politburo, Secretariat of Central Committee, Orgburo, preparation of resolutions of these Communist Party Units and implementation of these resolutions. For this reason the staff members of Secret/Special Section could be suspected of conspiracy. The job duties and job functions of staff members of Secret/Special Section were also secret even from relations. The leaking of any information related to job duties and/or secret documents was the reason for punishment of staff member of Secret/Special Section without civil trial.

The duties of Secret/Special Section also included the control of conditions for storing of secret documents and their use, investigation of violation management, using and storing of secret documents; in collaboration with GPU and NKVD carrying out investigation of leaking secret information, developing instruction for handling of secret documents, encryption, archiving and others duties related to handling of secret information.

In 1933 the Special Section of Central Committee was assigned to work under directions of Stalin, or Kaganovich when Stalin was not available.

From 1935 Poskrebyshev also acted as the Director of Administration of the General Secretary, succeeding Ivan Tovstukha on his death. In this position, all of Stalin's documents passed through his hands. This was a position of considerable trust and importance. Nicolaevsky believes that Poskrebyshev was given a rubber stamp with which he could affix Stalin's signature to documents.

The Special Section received information from the NKVD and supervised a pyramid of district Special Sections which reported Party information. It was fundamentally responsible for secret communications and security issues within the Party, and was therefore a position of considerable importance.

The importance of Poskrebyshev increased during and following the Second World War, wherein he served an important role as Stalin's organizer and as a point of contact for generals such as Georgy Zhukov.

== Purges ==
According to investigations of the Russian opposition group "Memorial", the lists of convicted were not managed by Special Sector of Central Committee. The "Memorial" Group says that Nikolai Yezhov personally visited all members of the Politburo to get their endorsement of the lists of convicted.

Nikolaevsky suggested that Poskrebyshev had been responsible for "liaison with Stalin and supervising the removal of top figures whom Stalin, for one reason or another, did not want openly arrested", and for "surveillance of the Party Secretariat"; It is not clear what document or reference has been used as source of this allegation, and who Stalin removed using Poskrebyshev and Special Sector of Central Committee. The prosecution of individuals was outside of scope of work duties of Special Sector of Central Committee, unless these persons were members of Special Sector. Even in the latter case, the number of members of Special Sector was limited and the fate of most of them was not known due to secrecy.

These speculations are also in contradiction with history of his second wife and her relations, as well as the evidence of his daughter Natalia. Her mother Bronislava Poskrebysheva was arrested in 1939. At this time Poskrebyshev, much like other prominent members of the Communist Party (for example, Vyacheslav Molotov and Mikhail Kalinin) was not able to help his wife. She was accused by Lavrenty Beria of counter-revolutionary liaisons with Leon Trotsky, and was executed in 1941. Such cases are unlikely to have arisen in the case of individuals who were playing a leading role in the conduct of the purges. In contrast, the leading role of Beria in the purges is more evident. The arrest of Poskrebyshev's wife might have allowed him to remove Poskrebyshev from Stalin's inner circle and replace him with an individual controlled by Beria. In this scenario the next step would have been total control of Stalin by Beria.

Poskrebyshev was not an ally of Nikolai Yezhov but some collaborative government business was to be expected due to the membership of Nikolai Yezhov in the Secretariat of the Central Committee. Probably he had garnered the animosity of Beria by spearheading corruption investigations in the Georgian apparatus of the NKVD—then controlled by Beria—in 1938.

The involvement of Poskrebyshev in the prosecution of Party officials was assumed by Parrish based on case of M.P. Mager. "On 6 June 1941, Poskrebyshev wrote a report to the Central Committee indicting M. P. Mager, the Chief of Staff of the Leningrad Military District, who had already been arrested once in 1938." However, the role of Poskrebyshev in this case is not clear. According to records of commission of Presidium of Central Committee of Communist Party Mager was arrested under resolution of the Ministry of Defense of the USSR, affirmed by Semyon Timoshenko (March 1941). He was accused of military conspiracy against the Soviet Union. On 15 May 1941, he wrote a letter to Stalin with a statement of his innocence. On June 6, 1941, the letter was directed to the attention of Poskrebyshev and most probably delivered to Stalin. However, in spite of this, on 20 July 1941, the Supreme Military Court of USSR did make a decision regarding the Mager case: the death sentence (he was rehabilitated in 1955).

Noticeably, Alexander N. Poskrebyshev did help many artists and scientists of USSR to avoid being purged or executed.

== Eradication of cosmopolitanism ==
The participation of Poskrebyshev in the presidium of Court of Honor in 1947 and 1948 mentioned by Michael Parrish is not supported by other sources. The origin of Parrish's claim is also unclear, since he does not refer to official documents. Poskrebyshev did participate in a January 1947 discussion of the publication of Georgi Fedorovich Aleksandrov's History of Western Philosophy. The conclusions of the first discussion were criticized by Andrei Zhdanov in April 1947, soon after the publication of the Council of Ministers of USSR and Central Committee of VKP(b) resolution dated 28 March 1947 "Concerning courts of honor at Ministries of USSR and States Departments" introduced a Court of Honor in the USSR. Zhdanov, dissatisfied with the first discussion's conclusions, organized a second discussion (16–25 June 1947). Poskrebyshev is not mentioned in the second discussion, whose conclusions were more radical.

Poskrebyshev is also mentioned in connection with the works of Soviet scientists N. G. Klueva and G. I. Roskin, who participated in one of the first USSR Court of Honor cases (June 1947). In April 1946, Poskrebyshev focused Joseph Stalin's attention on technical problems in the research of an anti-cancer drug mentioned by Klueva and Roskin. A laboratory for studying anti-cancer drugs was created on 22 April 1946, and it ordered equipment though the Council of Ministers of the Soviet Union.

== Military service ==
Poskrebyshev's work in the military consisted entirely of political work. He began as a political commissar in Turkestan, and served in the political department of the district Revolutionary Military Committee between 1918 and 1919. During the Second World War, Poskrebyshev attended most of the meetings of the Soviet High Command, and maintained liaison between Stalin and the Soviet Generals. Poskrebyshev was promoted to the rank of Major-General in July 1946.

== Personal life ==
Poskrebyshev is reported to have worked sixteen to eighteen hours a day. He organized Stalin's activities and accompanied him.

According to his daughter Natalia:

"Poskrebyshev worked almost 24 hours a day during the Second World War. He came home at 5 am and returned to work at 10 am. People who knew Poskrebyshev called him the living encyclopedia. He always had the answer to anything."

He married three times, and fathered three daughters.

=== Marriages ===
He was first married to a Polish revolutionary, Jadwiga, from 1919 to 1929; she later died of tuberculosis, in 1937. In 1934 he married Bronislava Poskrebysheva, with whom he was to father a daughter Natasha. She had a daughter Galya by a previous marriage. While his marriage to Poskrebysheva was stable, she was arrested in 1939 and executed in 1941. Stalin ignored Poskrebyshev's second time pleas for her release and instead offered to find him "another wife". This led to his third marriage (1942). In this marriage he fathered his third daughter, Elena.

=== Personality ===
When Stalin first hired Poskrebyshev, he reputedly told him: "Poskrebyshev you have a frightful look about you. You'll terrify people." But according to Lavrentiy Beria's son Sergo, "Actually this man's appearance was more comical than frightening. He was a narrow-shouldered dwarf. When he sat at the table you could only see his head. Dreadfully ugly, he resembled a monkey." Alexander Barmine, who first met Poskrebyshev in 1923, described him as "a roly-poly, red-cheeked baldish little man ... (who) grew in importance and pomposity during the fifteen years that I knew him." Khrushchev called Poskrebyshev "Stalin's faithful dog", and wrote that by 1952:

Everyone knew exactly who Poskrebyshev was and feared and avoided him. He wasn't a stupid man, but he had accumulated so much power that he had started putting on airs. He behaved haughtily with everyone and downright despicably with any member of the Praesidium who had fallen out of Stalin's favour. He used to snarl viciously at Molotov and Mikoyan, for instance, when they fell from grace. Poskrebyshev could be unbearably offensive.

=== In literature ===
Poskrebyshev appears as a character in Aleksandr Solzhenitsyn's novel, In the First Circle, where he is described as "having the soul of an officer's batman", and wrote that:

His name, derived from the Russian word 'to scrape' suited him well: at his conception the Fates had somehow failed to scrape together those qualities which go to make a complete human being But when he dealt with subordinates this dim-looking balding courtier became vastly important.

There is also a sarcastic portrayal of him in the story Stalin's Smile by N. Karaguzhin about the time when his second wife was arrested that was written in 1961 and distributed illegally by samizdat.

== Relationship with Stalin ==
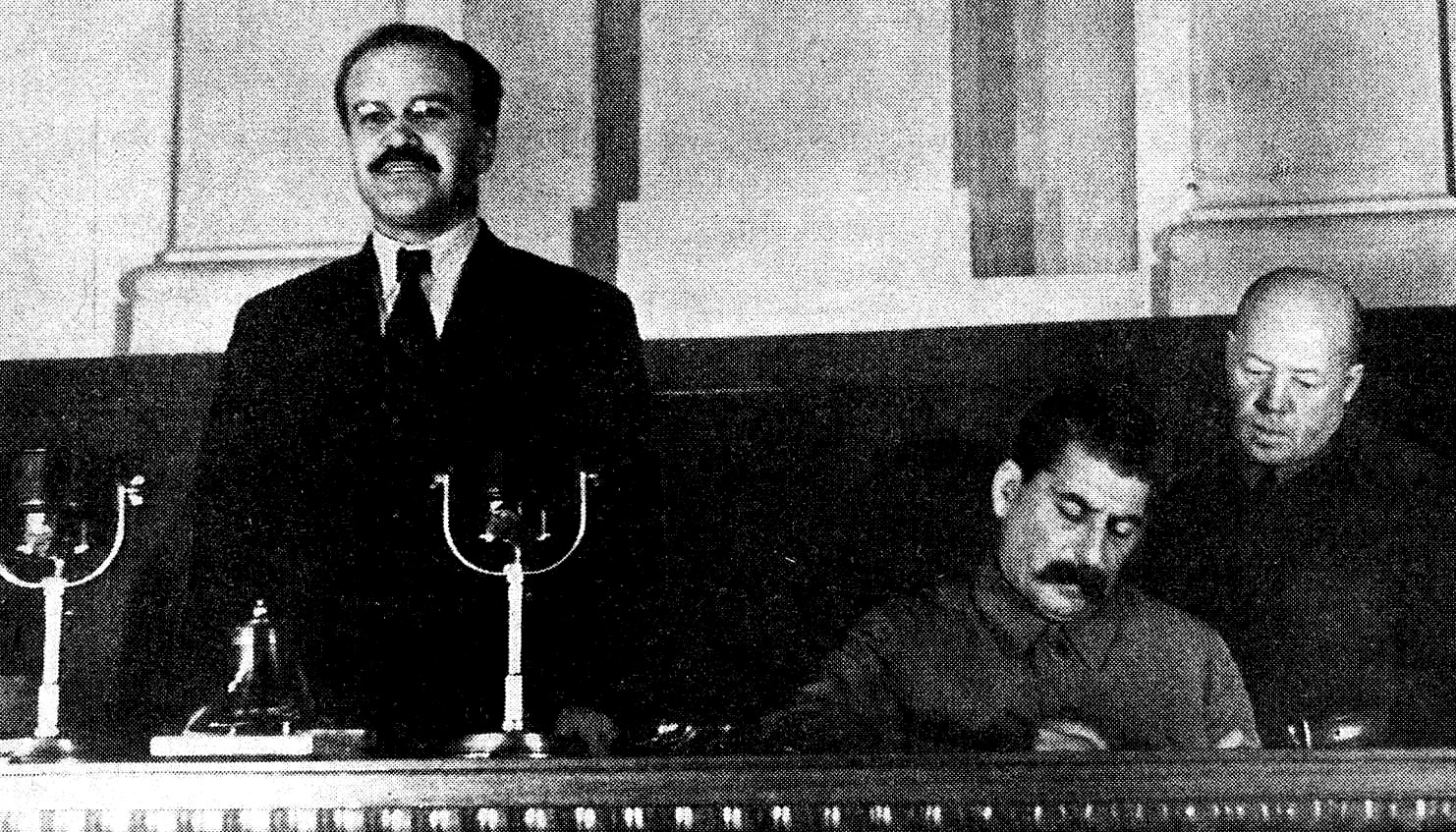
Molotov, Stalin, and Poskrebyshev at the 17th Congress of the All-Union Communist Party

He enjoyed a very close relationship with Stalin—according to Harford Montgomery Hyde, "if Stalin ever trusted anyone, it was Poskrebyshev". According to the evidence of Natalia Poskrebysheva (daughter) the relations between Stalin and her father were friendly outside of work. In work they were respectful and collaborative.

The reported speculation of unknown eyewitnesses concerning routine humiliation of Poskrebyshev by Stalin must be considered as simple gossip. Because of this perceived submissiveness, Poskrebyshev became the butt of a series of jokes among Party officials.

As part of his job as private secretary, Poskrebyshev took down Stalin's dictation and organized his diary. He was also the first port of call for anyone wishing to see the Soviet leader. When Stalin was at his dachas in the Caucasus, the only visitors would be those specifically allowed by Poskrebyshev and Nikolai Vlasik, Stalin's chief bodyguard.

According to Poskrebyshev, Stalin ordered Lenin's widow, Nadezhda Krupskaya’s poisoning during her birthday celebration, her ashes were buried in the Kremlin Wall Necropolis.

== Awards ==
Poskrebyshev was awarded the Order of Lenin in March 1939, for "many years of exemplary service". He also contributed to the Constitution of USSR of 1936 and the History of CPSU of 1938. He received the Order of Lenin a second and third time in 1944 and 1945 for services rendered during the War. The fourth Order of Lenin Poskrebyshev received, on 6 August 1951, was for his 60th birthday and in honor of his work for the Communist Party and Soviet Union. As a four-time recipient of one of the highest awards by the Soviet Union, Poskrebyshev's reputation as a confidant of Stalin was further reinforced.

Poskrebyshev also was awarded the Medal "For the Victory over Germany in the Great Patriotic War 1941–1945" and the Medal "For Valiant Labour in the Great Patriotic War 1941-1945".

Speculations published by author Helen Rappaport that Poskrebyshev had been awarded the Order of Lenin due to his services during the Great Purge are not supported historically (see above "Great Purge").

== Downfall, retirement, and death ==
Stalin removed Poskrebyshev from his position in the Special Section and from his role as personal secretary in 1952, under pressure from Lavrenty Beria. In 1953, he was removed from active political life and forcibly retired after coming into connection with the Doctor's Plot—he had been a medical student and had also administered Stalin with medicine. He was implicated as being part of a conspiracy with Viktor Abakumov.

After the deaths of Stalin and Beria, Poskrebyshev was rehabilitated and given a post in the Presidium of the Central Committee, but this was not to last. Following the 20th Congress in 1956, at which he was denounced in passing by Khrushchev, Poskrebyshev retired permanently and lived out the remainder of his days in Moscow, dying there in 1965. He received an entry in the First and Second Great Soviet Encyclopedia, but was not included in the Third Edition.

== See also ==
- Outline of the Russian Revolution and Civil War
- Bibliography of the Russian Revolution and Civil War
- Bibliography of Stalinism and the Soviet Union
- Index of Old Bolsheviks
- Index of articles related to the Russian Revolution and Civil War

== Notes ==
1.More accurately Romanized as Aleksandr Nikolayevich Poskryobishev.
