= Yuri Zhukov (historian) =

Russian historian (1938–2023)

- Юрий Жуков
- Born: 22 January 1938; Krasnogorsk, Moscow Oblast, Russian SFSR, Soviet Union
- Died: 3 March 2023 (aged 85)
- Education: Russian State Historico-Archival Institute
- Known for: Stalin-era research
- Scientific career
- Fields: History
- Workplaces: Institute of Russian History at Russian Academy of Sciences

Yuri Nikolayevich Zhukov (Russian: Юрий Николаевич Жуков; 22 January 1938 – 3 March 2023) was a Russian historian and researcher at the Institute of Russian History at the Russian Academy of Sciences. Zhukov published several books that glorify Joseph Stalin, such as Renaissance of Stalin and Handbook of a Stalinist.

== Historical views ==
Zhukov argued that Stalin was not personally responsible for the Great Purge and shifted the blame onto subordinates of Stalin. According to Zhukov, Stalin had conducted liberal reforms in the Soviet Union and launched the purges against real threats to Soviet security. Zhukov has also argued that by assuming sole power, Stalin had "saved the country and the world" from Lev Kamenev, Leon Trotsky, and Grigory Zinoviev, for in Zhukov's view their revolutionary politics brought the Soviet Union into conflict with the world.

== Reception ==
Russian historian Oleg Khlevniuk described Zhukov as a follower of ideas developed by American revisionist historian Arch Getty according to whom Stalin was not a cruel dictator, but a supporter of democracy. In a 2011 article for World Affairs, Marek Jan Chodakiewicz and Tomasz Sommer listed Zhukov, among others, as an example of historians which have been embraced by "Stalin apologists". In a 2012 Literaturnaya Gazeta interview, historian Gennady Kostyrchenko stated that virtually all of Zhukov's most recent historical works have had the moral and political rehabilitation of Stalin as their overriding theme. Writing for Reason in 2013, journalist Cathy Young described Zhukov as a "pro-Stalin historian". Zhukov criticized the speech by Krushchev about Stalinism by commenting that "Khrushchev was trying to dump all the blame on Stalin when his own hands were drenched in blood".

== Works ==
- Zhukov, Yuri (2000). Secrets of Kremlin: Stalin, Molotov, Beria, Malenkov. Moscow. p. 688. ISBN 5-300-02990-4.
- Zhukov, Yuri (2003). Different Stalin. USSR Political Reforms in 1933–1937. Moscow. p. 510. ISBN 5-9697-0026-6.
- Zhukov, Yuri (2008). Stalin: Secrets of State Power. Moscow. p. 720. ISBN 978-5-9697-0472-5.
- Zhukov, Yuri (2010). Handbook of a Stalinist. Moscow. p. 320. ISBN 978-5-699-40304-2.
- Zhukov, Yuri (2010). The Puzzle of 1937. Moscow. p. 576. ISBN 978-5-699-46904-8.
- Zhukov, Yuri (2011). Stalin's First Defeat. 1917–1922. From Russian Empire to USSR. Moscow. p. 672. ISBN 978-5-905024-02-3.
