= United Nations Security Council Resolution 95 =

UN Security Council Resolution 95
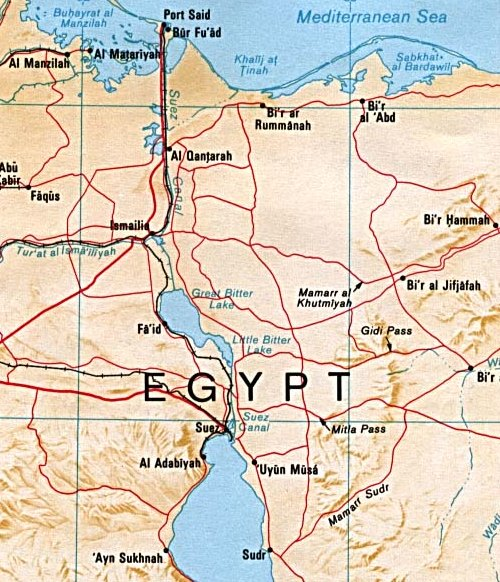
- Map of the Suez Canal
- Date: September 1 1951
- Meeting no.: 558
- Code: S/2322 (Document)
- Subject: The Palestine Question
- Voting summary: 8 voted for; None voted against; 3 abstained
- Result: Adopted

Security Council composition
- Permanent members: China; France; Soviet Union; United Kingdom; United States
- Non-permanent members: Brazil; Ecuador; India; Netherlands; Turkey; Yugoslavia

United Nations Security Council Resolution 95, was adopted on September 1, 1951. After it reminded both sides in the Arab–Israeli conflict of recent promises and statements saying they would work for peace, the Council chastised Egypt for preventing ships bound for Israeli ports from travelling through the Suez Canal and called upon the Egyptian Government to immediately cease all interference with any shipping save that which was essential for safety. It was passed by 8 votes to none, with 3 abstentions by China, India and the Soviet Union. It was a rare resolution critical of the Arab states in the Arab–Israeli conflict, passed before the period that the Soviet Union invariably used its veto power against such resolutions.

The resolution was adopted by eight votes in favour, and three abstentions from India, the Republic of China and Soviet Union.

== See also ==
- Israeli passage through the Suez Canal and Straits of Tiran
- List of United Nations Security Council Resolutions 1 to 100 (1946–1953)
- Suez Crisis
- Soviet Union and the Arab–Israeli conflict
