= Ivan Tovstukha =

Soviet politician (1889–1935)

- Иван Товстуха
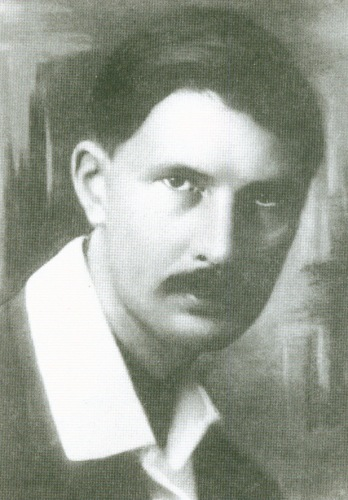
- Born: February 10, 1889; Berezna, Ukraine
- Died: August 9, 1935 (aged 46); Moscow, USSR
- Resting place: Kremlin Wall Necropolis

Ivan Pavlovich Tovstukha (Ukrainian: Іван Павлович Товстуха, Ukrainian pronunciation: [iˈwɑn ˈpɑu̯lɔʋɪt͡ʃ towˈstuxɑ]; Russian: Иван Павлович Товстуха, Russian pronunciation: [ɪˈvan ˈpavləvʲɪt͡ɕ tɐfˈstuxə]; February 10, 1889 – August 9, 1935) was a Ukrainian revolutionary, Soviet politician, Communist Party functionary, and personal secretary of Joseph Stalin. He was the author of the first official biography of Stalin.

== Biography ==
=== Early life ===
Ivan Tovstukha was born in the family of a clerk, on 10 (22) February, 1889, in Berezna, Chernigov region of Ukraine.

During the 1905 Revolution, as a student at a secondary school, he joined subversive 'literary evenings' organised by the Ukrainian writer Mykhailo Kotsiubynsky. In 1909 he started working at the Chernigov Social-Democratic organization.

In July 1909 Chernigov police searched Tovstukha's room and found about 240 prohibited books, including works of Marx, Engels, August Bebel, Plekhanov, Maxim Gorky. The illegal library belonged to the Social-Democratic groups of pupils of the local seminary. Tovstukha, now aged 20, was arrested and sentenced to exile in Siberia. His exile started in 1911 in Irkutsk province, where Tovstukha carried revolutionary propaganda among locals and exiles, and was involved in raising money for the publication of the newspaper Pravda.

In January 1912, he fled abroad, and in 1913 joined the French Socialist Party, and the Paris section of the Bolshevik wing of the RSDLP, led by Lenin. In exile, he worked as a digger, assistant fireman, worked in the kitchen, and as a driver.

=== Post-revolutionary career ===
Tovstukha returned to Russia in 1917, after the February Revolution, and from November 1917 to March 1918, worked with the Central Staff of the Red Guards.

His association with Stalin dated from April 1918, when he was appointed secretary of the People's Commissariat for Nationalities, where Stalin was People's Commissar. When Stalin was appointed General Secretary of the Central Committee, Tovstukha was transferred to the Central Committee as Stalin's secretary, the first to hold that position.

In 1924, Tovstukha was replaced as Stalin's chief secretary by Lev Mekhlis, and was appointed assistant director of the Lenin Institute.

In 1926–1930, he again ran Stalin's private office as head of the Secret Department.

In 1927, Tovstukha wrote the biographical entry on Stalin in a special edition of the Granat Encyclopedia, to mark the tenth anniversary of the revolution. This entry, which was the first biography of Stalin published in the Soviet Union, was also published as a separate pamphlet, with a print run of 50,000.

=== Stalin's aide ===
In 1930, Boris Bazhanov, who had defected to the west after working in Stalin's personal secretariat, published a memoir in which he implied Tovstukha was a more significant figure than his job titles suggest. This is borne out by subsequent research. Long after Stalin's death, the playwright Edvard Radzinsky was researching Tovstukha's archive for a biography of Stalin when he was approached by an elderly man who had worked with Tovstukha, who said:

"He was effectively in charge of the Party Archive. He collected all the Lenin documents ... In 1929, it was decided to make Stalin's 50th birthday the occasion for nationwide celebrations. Tovstukha began removing from the archives all documents concerning Stalin, particularly his pre-revolutionary career, ostensibly in order to write a full biography. But no full biography appeared. He collected the documents to make sure they were never published."

According to Bazhanov, Tovstukha also studied the returns from elections to the Central Committee, to identify those who had not voted for Stalin. Delegates to party congresses were give a list of preferred candidates, but could cross out individual names and write in others, in a supposedly secret ballot. Tovstukha allegedly enlisted a graphologist to help him identify the handwriting of delegates who had made alterations. Bazhanov described Tovstukha as "a gloomy subject", who had a persistent cough and "only half a lung" (because of his tuberculosis) but in whom Stalin had "complete confidence".

At the beginning of the power struggle that followed Lenin's death in 1924, Tovstukha's appointment to the Lenin Institute gave him access to every available document about Lenin, including those that detailed his sharp differences pre-1917 with Leon Trotsky. Tovstukha's appointment "gave Stalin control over the Lenin Archive, providing him with an ideological and polemic tool of the first importance. Tovstukha learnt to know his way about the archive better than anyone. He was able to supply Stalin with material about Trotsky or any other enemy." Tovstukha was rumoured to be the author of an anonymous leaflet circulated in 1924 entitled Small Biography of a Great Man, which suggested that though Trotsky like to think of himself as an Old Bolshevik and a great man, he really should be called an Old Menshevik.

It was Tovstukha who falsified Stalin's date of birth, for reasons unknown. Throughout the Stalin years, and long afterwards, it was consistently written that he was born on 21 December 1879, when his birth certificate gives the actual date as 18 December (6 December in the Old Style) 1878.

An indication of the importance Stalin attached to Tovstukha's work is that he secretly wrote to the publishers, instructing that Tovstukha was to receive royalties, warning that if Tovstukha were to say he did not need to be paid "he's lying: he's desperately short of money." But he eventually clashed with Stalin, who sacked or transferred members of Tovstukha's department without consulting him while he was away. Tovstukha submitted a written protest, on which Stalin scribbled: "Ha, ha, ha. Here's a real bantam." In 1930, he was replaced as Stalin's chief aide by Alexander Poskrebyshev.

In 1930–31, Tovstukha was deputy director of the Lenin Institute, a member of editorial board of the journal "Proletarian Revolution". From 1931, he was deputy director, then Head of Archives of the Marx–Engels–Lenin Institute. In February 1934, he was elected a candidate member of the Central Committee. He worked on assembling and editing the collected works of Lenin.

=== Death ===
Tovstukha died of tuberculosis on August 9, 1935, in Moscow. His ossuary was buried in the Kremlin Wall.

== Works ==
- Iosif Vissarionovich Stalin: Short Biography. [1927] Corvallis, OR: 1000 Flowers Publishing, 2026.
