= General Department of the Communist Party of the Soviet Union =

General Department of the Central Committee of the CPSU
- Общий отдел ЦК КПСС
- Formation: September 1920
- Dissolved: August 1991
- Type: Department directly reporting to the Central Committee
- Headquarters: Staraya Square, Moscow, Russian SFSR
- Director: Pavel Laptev (last)
- Parent organization: Central Committee of the CPSU

The General Department of the Central Committee of the Communist Party of the Soviet Union was a department of the Central Committee of the Communist Party of the Soviet Union that oversaw the paperwork of all Central Committee institutions.

== Heads ==
Office of the Presidium

- Nikolai Smirnov (12 September 1920 – 20 August 1922)
- Hamayak Nazaretyan (20 August 1922 – 1 November 1924)
- Lev Mekhlis (1 November 1924 – 22 January 1926)
- Ivan Tovstukha (25 January 1926 – 16 July 1930)
- Alexander Poskrebyshev (25 July 1930 – 15 August 1952)
- Dmitri Sukhanov (15 August 1952 – 20 February 1955)

General Department

- Vladimir Malin (20 February 1955 – 30 August 1965)
- Konstantin Chernenko (30 August 1965 – 12 November 1982)
- Klavdii Bogolyubov (12 November 1982 – 24 May 1985)
- Anatoly Lukyanov (24 May 1985 – 17 January 1987)
- Valery Boldin (17 January 1987 – 3 May 1991)
- Pavel Laptev (3 May 1991 – 29 August 1991)

== See also ==
- General Office of the Chinese Communist Party
- Office of the Politburo of the Central Committee of the SED
