= Izabella Tabarovsky =

Soviet-born writer and activist (born 1969 or 1970)

Izabella Tabarovsky (born 1970) is a Soviet-born writer and activist specializing in Eastern European history and contemporary antisemitism. She is the Kennan Institute Senior Advisor on Regional Partnerships and Programming.

== Early life and education ==
Tabarovsky grew up in Novosibirsk, Siberia and immigrated to the United States from the USSR with her family in 1990. Her great-grandfather was imprisoned in Siberia by Stalin.

== Career ==
Tabarovsky has studied the Holocaust, independent media in Russia, Stalinist repression, Soviet and contemporary left antisemitism. She served as an associate producer on the PBS documentary “Commanding Heights: The Battle for the World Economy”. Her pieces have been published in The Forward, Newsweek, Tablet, and Fathom Journal. Tabarovsky has described the role of local populations "under the influence of anti-Semitic Nazi propaganda and weary from the brutality of Soviet rule" who committed atrocities against Jews during the Holocaust. She showed that Nazi propaganda was later recycled by the Soviet regime, including a cartoon depicting the Jew as an octopus dominating the world, with Russian words for aggression, provocation, terror and others on its tentacles, published in Krokodil in 1972. She described how the Soviet regime used collective condemnation to silence intellectuals and cultural figures, a phenomenon later echoed in 21st-century American society. She noted the role of the Yevsektsiya, a Jewish Communist Party unit set up in 1918, which persecuted other Jews and targeted religious practice, Zionist activity and use of the Hebrew language, before ending up in prison or labor camps by the late 1930s.

Tabarovsky has examined how antisemitism has been obfuscated and delegitimized as a Zionist conspiracy. Tabarovsky highlighted Moscow's comparisons between Zionism and Ukrainian nationalism on Kyiv TV as a mechanism of Soviet propaganda. Jake Wallis Simons described Tabarovsky as the "most important academic" exposing the role of the Soviet propaganda apparatus and KGB in portraying Zionism as imperialist colonialism. She noted the regime's connection of Zionism with racism, apartheid, and settler colonialism. Tabarovsky's scholarship on how the “transfer” agreement between the Zionist movement and the Nazi regime was distorted by Soviet propagandists was reviewed favorably by Bustan. Tabarovsky described how the notion of “Jewish exclusivity” was later radicalized into the dogma that “the Jews” believe in their “own racial superiority.” Her work traced the origins of the Soviet propaganda campaign to the early 1940s. Tabarovsky noted that in the late 1960s, the USSR originated the field of "Zionology" that actively discredited Zionism; for example, 1969’s Beware: Zionism! by party official Yuri Ivanov sold more than 800,000 copies. She coined the term "new refuseniks" to describe young Jews of Soviet origin who were filling a void in Jewish community leadership and activism in the 21st century.

Tabarovsky's work on Russia's involvement in Middle East geopolitics has been cited in the literature. She traced Russia's depiction of Ukrainians as Neo-Nazi fascists to Russia's 2014 invasion of Crimea. She outlined how Putin deflected attention from Russian antisemitism by declaring that the USSR ended the Holocaust. She noted that Russian Foreign Minister Sergey Lavrov’s suggestion that Volodymyr Zelenskyy "shared Hitler's Jewish blood" echoed Soviet-era antisemitic and anti-Zionist propaganda.

Tabarovsky has written that there is a "mountain of evidence contradicting" the accusation that Israel is committing genocide in Gaza and that "the claim [is] irreconcilable with facts."

== Selected works ==
=== The Holocaust ===
- "Putin’s New Propaganda Campaign Turns Jews into a Prop", The Forward, January 2020
- "Most Jews Weren't Murdered in Death Camps. It's Time To Talk About The Other Holocaust", The Forward, June 2019
- "Babi Yar: The Holocaust as a Final Solution Began Here", Newsweek, September 2016.

=== Antisemitism and Anti-Zionism ===
- "Ukrainian-Jewish Musical Journeys: From The Pale To The Promised Lands", The Odessa Review, November 2017
- "Senator Sanders, Fighting Anti-Semitism Requires Actions, not Just Universalist Promises", The Forward, November 2019
- "Book Review | A Specter Haunting Europe: The Myth of Judeo-Bolshevism", Fathom Journal, October 2019
- "The Left Can No Longer Excuse Its Anti-Semitism", The Forward, August 2019
- "Understanding the Real Origin of that New York Times Cartoon: How anti-Semitic Soviet propaganda informs contemporary left anti-Zionism", Tablet, June 2019
- "To understand Labour antisemitism, go back to the USSR's giant anti-Zionism campaign", Jewish Chronicle, May 2019
- "Soviet Anti-Zionism and Contemporary Left Antisemitism", Fathom Journal, May 2019
- "We Soviet Jews Lived Through State-Sponsored Anti-Zionism. We Know How It Is Weaponized", The Forward, March 2019
- "Demonization Blueprints: Soviet Conspiracist Antizionism in Contemporary Left-Wing Discourse". Journal of Contemporary Antisemitism. 5 (1): 1–20, 2022.
- “The Soviet Origins of Contemporary Anti-Zionist Discourse”, Antisemitic Anti-Zionism: The Origins and Character of an Ideology. London: Labour Friends of Israel (LFI). 2023.
- "The Three Best Books on Soviet Anti-Zionism, recommended by Izabella Tabarovsky". Fathom, July 2024
- "Canceled ... in Finland", Tablet Magazine, February 2025.
- "Soviet Anti-Zionism and Contemporary Left Antisemitism", Mapping the New Left Antisemitism, 2023

=== Cold War history ===
- "What My Soviet Life Has Taught Me About Censorship and Why It Makes Us Dumb", Areo, May 2021
- "The liberation fight for Soviet Jews was a miracle. Most of us didn't know about it", Jewish Telegraphic Agency, April 2019
- "Walking in Each Other’s Shoes: Through the Iron Curtain and Back", Wilson Quarterly, Fall 2016

=== Stalinist totalitarianism ===
- "How ‘The New York Times’ Helped Hide Stalin’s Mass Murders in Ukraine", Tablet, October 2020
- "Why Are Memories of Stalin’s Terror Being Buried?", Newsweek, February 2017
- "The Price of Silence: Family Memory of Stalin’s Repressions", Wilson Quarterly, Fall 2016
