= Vladimir Begun =

Russian academic

Vladimir Yakovlevich Begun (Russian: Влади́мир Яковлевич Бегу́н; 1929–1989) was a prominent official Zionologist in the Soviet Union. He was a senior writer and researcher at the Institute for Philosophy and Law of the Belarusian Academy of Sciences, a state communist propagandist, and a member of the Union of Journalists of the USSR.

Begun's works focused on themes such as the Jewish conspiracy against communist countries. He characterized Zionism as the worst enemy of communism and an extended arm of Western imperialism. Together with other propagandists, he blamed Judaism and Torah as the roots of the Zionist danger. He maintained that it legitimized a "chosen people" ideology of racial superiority.

One of his controversial books, "The Encroaching Counter Revolution," caused some controversy. In November 1975, the leading Soviet historian, academician M. Korostovtsev, criticized it, stating, "...it perceptibly stirs up anti-Semitism under the flag of anti-Zionism." According to Wolf Rubinchyk, a researcher based in Minsk, Begun's notorious book The Invasion without Arms was used not only by official propagandists but also by some members of the counter-elite, young Belarusian nationalists, who were suspicious about Zionism. Rubinchyk also pointed out falsifications of Simon Dubnow's ideas by Begun.

Begun gained a certain position in the Soviet hierarchy and was transferred from provincial Minsk to Moscow. Until his death, he staunchly opposed bringing Marc Chagall's exhibition to Belarus, the famous artist's place of birth, on "anti-Zionist" grounds.
