= Bronislava Poskrebysheva =

Soviet physician (1910–1941)

Bronislava Solomonovna Metallikova (Masenkis)-Poskrebysheva (Russian: Бронислава Соломоновна Металликова-Поскрёбышева, 5 March 1910 – 16 October 1941) was born in Proskurov, Podolia Governorate. She was the wife of Alexander Poskrebyshev, Joseph Stalin's personal assistant for many years.

== Biography ==
Bronislava, a doctor-endocrinologist at the Research Institute of Endocrinology (Department of Health of Russian Federation), was of Jewish Lithuanian descent and previously married to a lawyer. She had two children, Galya by her first husband and Natalya by Alexander Poskrebyshev.

In 1933 she and her brother, Professor Michael Metallikov, attended a scientific conference in Paris. There they met Leon Trotsky, to whom they were connected through marriage. This meeting with Trotsky was a reason for the arrest of Metallikov on July 8, 1937, and for his execution on March 31, 1939. (He was posthumously rehabilitated on March 7, 1956.) Bronislava, who at this time was pregnant with Natalya, was not arrested due to the intercession of her husband.

In 1939, under pressure from her relatives, she visited Lavrentiy Beria alone to plead for the life of her arrested brother. This time, she was accused by Beria of being connected with Trotskyists, and was arrested. On this occasion, her husband was unable or perhaps unwilling to help. She was imprisoned, sentenced to death on September 22, 1941, shot on October 13, and buried in a mass grave near Moscow. She was posthumously rehabilitated on October 10, 1957. She is commememorated at Novodevichy Cemetery in Moscow.

Her husband saved her daughters, and continued to work as Stalin's secretary until he was dismissed shortly before Stalin's death in 1953. Poskrebyshev was both "Father and Mother" to Galya and Natasha after his wife was arrested. Despite his wife's fate, Poskrebyshev survived Stalin, and died in 1965.
