= Soviet pro-Arab propaganda =

Soviet pro-Arab propaganda describes a campaign of Soviet propaganda initiated as a means of developing support from the Arab nations in the Middle East which would commonly involve expressing contempt for the actions of Israel and the United States.

== Background ==
As early as the 1920s and 1930s, the All-Union Communist Party Congress discussed solutions to dealing with the pan-movements—including pan-Arabism, pan-Islamism and pan-Turkism. The Soviet Union saw all of the pan-movements as a problem. Islam was seen in a negative light as the Soviets saw all other religions, but a tactical approach had to be taken with Islam due to the relationship that was to develop between the Middle East and the Soviet Union. While there was a string of Soviet anti-Islamic propaganda, there was also an attempt at understanding Islam on an ideological level. Pan-Arabism was the least important of the movements during the period, but it had the most potential for growth and support in the future. This understanding would help the Soviets to realize the need to support the pan-Arab movement, especially when it came to developing relations with Egypt and Palestine.

The Soviet Union began to develop interest in the Middle East in the early-1950s, intensifying after Joseph Stalin's death in 1953. Evidence points to the fact that the Soviet Union developed an interest in the Middle East because of American efforts forge alliances within the region. The prestige in which the Soviet's gained the title as protectors against Western imperialism happened during the period of the Suez Canal Crisis. Many nations in the Middle East strengthened their diplomatic ties with the Soviet Union.

There were several reasons that developing pro-Arab propaganda was important for the Soviet Union and creating an Arab alliance, including:

- The weakness that could develop if the United States had strong alliances in the Middle East, especially in the Northern Tier (Afghanistan and Pakistan).
- To further demonize the United States and Israel as well as to create a split between all imperialist countries with Middle Eastern countries (especially Egypt).
- To spread communist ideals into other regions of the world.

== Propaganda operations ==
=== Palestinian Liberation Organization ===
Pro-Palestine propaganda was produced by the Soviets through print journalism and radio. A campaign began in 1968 in the media for a partisan struggle against the occupier (Israel). The Soviet Union discreetly showed that they were in support of violence, providing justification for future violence by the organization. For example, the Radio Moscow broadcast in Arabic following the Six-Day War stated that "the 'resistance movement had become a part of the general struggle of the Arab people against the Israeli aggression' and that it was therefore 'natural' that the Palestinian refugees should carry arms to defend their rights usurped by the aggressors". At this point, the Soviet Union was cautious of their support of the organization, but it was clear that they were justifying the terrorist action that they supposedly openly oppose. This Radio Moscow broadcast laid out the groundwork for the future campaign to present the Palestinian people as oppressed and the Palestine Liberation Organization (PLO) as a legitimate government with no country.

As violence by the PLO became more consistent throughout the early 1970s, the Soviets put up a cloak of denial. There was minimal coverage in their newspapers about the PLO terrorist attacks. When they did comment, it was directed away from Palestine. In 1974, the PLO laid an attack on Israel, killing 18 Israelis. The Telegraph Agency of the Soviet Union (TASS) blamed the attack on Israeli Arabs—this gave the attack legitimacy, presenting a partisan resistance and placing the blame on unknown persons or on Israel itself. This was a pattern that was developing with Radio Moscow, consistent patterns of denial and deception in the case of terrorism in the Middle East, specifically relating to the PLO. Much of the propaganda was pushed through Radio Moscow, but there were some instances where Pravda provided written propaganda and visual aid.

=== Israel as the aggressor against Palestine ===
The overt methods of propaganda and the support the Soviets gathered through the United Nations were meant to isolate the United States and Israel.

There were several reports of the United States providing Israel with napalm, cluster bombs and ball bearing bombs, showing that the United States was allowing for Israel to push people out of Lebanon and Palestine. The TASS went on to explain that the blame should not only be placed upon Israel for the violence that ensued, but the United States as well. Without the support of Washington "Israel would not have dared to commit such atrocities". The Soviet Union was painting a picture of violent aggressor (those being the United States and Israel) whilst presenting the Palestinian people as a unified group of oppressed people. This was presented in a package—radio and print, with visual aids as support. Any visual presentations of pro-Palestinian propaganda reinforced the fact that Israel was viewed as the aggressor and Palestine as the innocent.

In the summer of 1967, the Soviet Union's unconditional support of the Arab cause resulted in a frenzied anti-Israeli campaign which made abundant use of traditional antisemitic stereotypes, particularly in cartoons that usually accompanied articles in Soviet newspapers and magazines. This anti-Israeli campaign that was waged starting in the 1960s was meant as an extension of the pro-Arab propaganda, using this as a means to not only bring up their allies, but to demonize the enemy as well.

=== Egypt ===
In the 1940s and 1950s, it was important to convey a vision of pro-Arab/anti-imperialist propaganda. The Soviets realized the way to build a relationship with the Egyptians was to demonize the British. It is also important to note that pan-Arab nationalism was building during this period under Gamal Nasser. The Soviet Union began information warfare in Egypt.

In 1945, propaganda was covertly communist with the pro-Arab appeal. Print and oral media was focused on pushing out the British for the good of the Arab nation. The Soviets had their own radio station in Egyptian dialect to broadcast to the people. They also were approved for their own newspaper. Although Soviet propaganda spread throughout Egypt, the Egyptians never really became close with the Soviets. There was a sense of Soviet hospitality towards Egyptians, but "they seem to be afraid of getting into close contact with the Soviets". This could be due to the fact that Soviet propaganda was more pro-communism than pro-Arab in their information warfare during a period of growth for the pan-Arab movement.

== United States counter measures ==
The Middle East was a strategic location for the United States to claim allies. This location being the underbelly of the Soviet Union, the weak spot. It was because of this that the United States and the Soviet Union were constantly at battle for support in the Middle East region. There was also importance in maintain ties with Arab nations to ensure the lastly existence of Israel as well as to hold onto the flow of oil from the Middle East to the United States.

Throughout the Cold War, the United States found ways to combat communism and the Soviet Union, but it was during the 1950s that the United States became very active in propaganda as a tool. The purpose of American propaganda was to control and prevent the spread of communism as well as to warn of its dangers. In addition, American propaganda was meant to create a "reversal of anti-American trends of Arab opinion". Some the means in which the United States exerted its influence in the Middle East was through pamphlets and brochures, newspapers and media as well as through exchange programs and other cultural exchanges.

=== Pamphlets, brochures and posters ===
In Iraq, there was a lack of radio access, minimal communist films and an unsympathetic press. This left the United States with the option of producing pamphlets. They targeted the educated and semi-educated masses that find themselves in the urban middle class. In Iran, the United States created Iranian government sponsored posters that were to be displayed in urban and rural schools.

=== Newspapers and other media ===
Efforts were made to produce information for the press that gave the United States a sense of neutrality in the Palestinian issue. There was also a campaign with the Arab press to help them to focus on their own problems and move away from outside influences, all while maintaining a relationship with the United States. In Iraq, there was an effort to "change the general prevailing public attitude in Iraq which is either unaware or apathetic toward the dangers of Soviet imperialism". This was an effort made through press for print media. There was also an instance in the 1950s that the United States government considered the idea of having Walt Disney develop an anti-communist film with characters that looked like Mickey Mouse, Pluto, Goofy and so forth. This was used as an effort to reach the masses, and enhance the reception of the information.

=== Cultural influence ===
Cultural influence was a way for the United States to shape opinion that was anti-communist and pro-Western through literary, educational and personal means. This was a means to reach the masses on a more personal level, a way to allow Arab persons to feel connected with the United States. An example of this can be seen in the fact that new reading rooms were built in Arab universities, with books favorable to the United States.

== See also ==
- Active measures
- Islam in Russia
- Soviet Union and the Arab–Israeli conflict
- Soviet Middle Eastern foreign policy during the Cold War
- Arab Cold War
