= Soviet Union and the Arab–Israeli conflict =

Part of the Cold War

Israel–Soviet Union relations
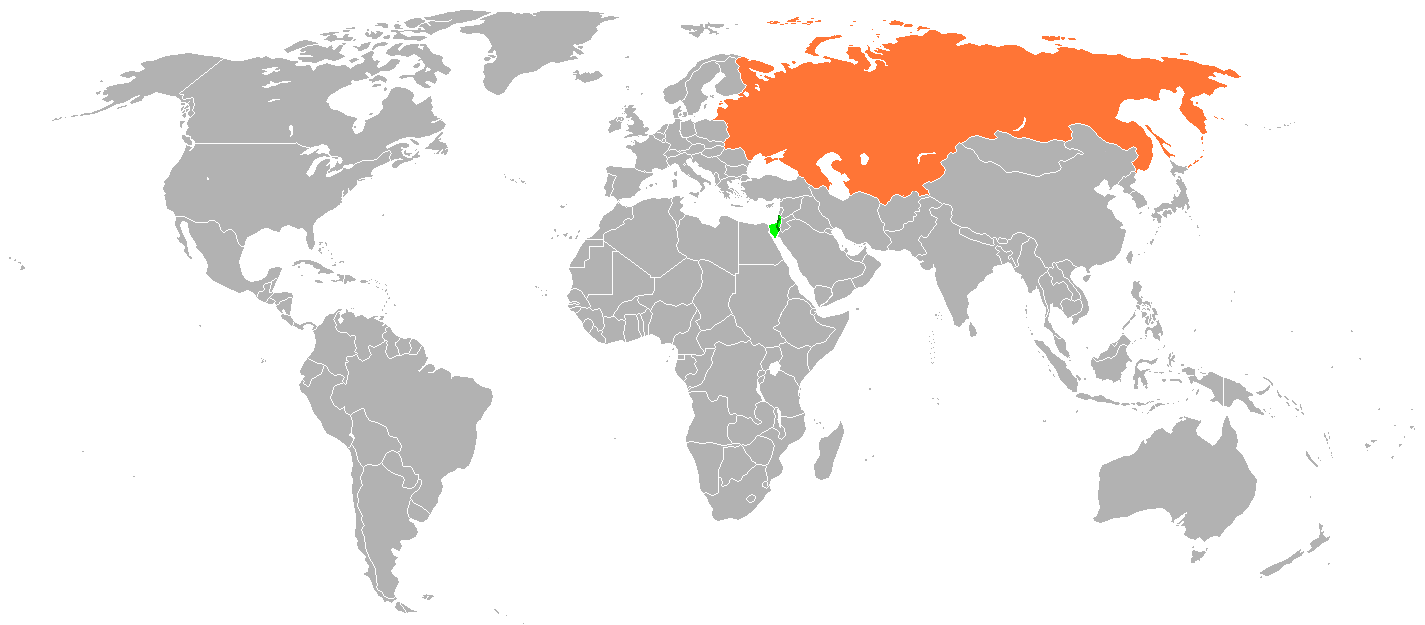

- Israel: Soviet Union

The Soviet Union played a significant role in the Arab–Israeli conflict as the conflict was a major part of the Cold War.

== Marxism–Leninism and Zionism ==
The official Soviet ideological position on Zionism condemned the movement as akin to "bourgeois nationalism". Vladimir Lenin, claiming to be deeply committed to egalitarian ideals and universality of all humanity, rejected Zionism as a reactionary movement, "bourgeois nationalism", "socially retrogressive", and a backward force that deprecates class divisions among Jews. Soviets believed that the main objective of the Zionist movement was to bring about a mass immigration of Jews into Israel from countries where they had been scattered among the general population, with a special emphasis placed on the Soviet Union. Under Joseph Stalin's rule, he initially accepted a limited emigration of Jews from the Soviet Union into Israel in order to invest in what he hoped would be a socialist Israel.

== Establishment of the State of Israel ==
For Soviet foreign policy decision-makers, pragmatism took precedence over ideology. Without changing its official anti-Zionist stance, from late 1944, until 1948 and even later, Joseph Stalin adopted a pro-Zionist foreign policy, apparently believing that the new country would be socialist and would accelerate the decline of British influence in the Middle East.

The USSR began to support Zionism at the UN during the 1947 UN Partition Plan debate. It preferred a Jewish–Arab binational state. But if this proved impossible it indicated that it would support partition and a Jewish state. On 14 May 1947, the Soviet ambassador Andrei Gromyko announced:

As we know, the aspirations of a considerable part of the Jewish people are linked with the problem of Palestine and of its future administration. This fact scarcely requires proof. ... During the last war, the Jewish people underwent exceptional sorrow and suffering. ...

The United Nations cannot and must not regard this situation with indifference, since this would be incompatible with the high principles proclaimed in its Charter. ...

The fact that no Western European State has been able to ensure the defence of the elementary rights of the Jewish people and to safeguard it against the violence of the fascist executioners explains the aspirations of the Jews to establish their own State. It would be unjust not to take this into consideration and to deny the right of the Jewish people to realize this aspiration.

Shortly after this speech, the Soviet media temporarily stopped publishing anti-Zionist material.

It followed this policy and gave support to the UN plan to partition the British Mandate of Palestine, which led to the founding of the State of Israel.

On May 17, 1948, three days after Israel declared independence, the Soviet Union legally recognized it de jure, becoming the first country to grant de jure recognition to the Jewish state. In addition to the diplomatic support, arms from Czechoslovakia, part of the Soviet bloc, were crucial to Israel in the 1948 Arab–Israeli War.

== Effects of the Cold War ==
The USSR soon switched sides in the Arab–Israeli conflict. After it tried to maintain a policy of friendship with Israel at first, abstaining from and allowing the passage of Security Council Resolution 95 in September 1951, which chastised Egypt for preventing ships bound for Israeli ports from travelling through the Suez Canal, asking them to cease interference on shipping for political purposes, in the latter part of 1953 it began to side with the Arabs in armistice violation discussions in the Security Council. As late as December, 1953, the Soviets were the first state to instruct their envoy to present his credentials to the president of Israel in Jerusalem, the Israeli annexation of and usage as the capital being controversial. This move was followed by other nations and strongly protested by the Arabs as "flouting" UN resolutions. On January 22, 1954, the Soviets vetoed a Security Council resolution (relating to a Syrian–Israeli water dispute) because of Arab objections for the first time, and soon after vetoed even a mild resolution expressing "grave concern" that Egypt was not living up to Security Council Resolution 95. This elicited Israeli complaints that resolutions recognizing its rights could not pass because of the Soviet veto policy. At the same time, however, the Soviets did support the Israeli demand for direct negotiations with the Arab states, which the Arab states opposed. Like the earlier deal with Israel, a major episode in the Soviet relation to the conflict was the Czech arms deal with Egypt for arms from the Soviet bloc in August 1955. After the mid-50s and throughout the remainder of the Cold War the Soviets unequivocally supported various Arab regimes over Israel.

With Israel emerging as a close Western ally, Zionism raised Communist leadership fears of internal dissent and opposition arising from the substantial segment of party members who were Jewish, leading to the declaration of Zionism as an ideological enemy. During the later parts of the Cold War Soviet Jews were persecuted as possible traitors, Western sympathisers, or a security liability. Jewish organizations were closed down, with the exception of a few token synagogues. These synagogues were then placed under police surveillance, both openly and through the use of informers.

As a result of the persecution, both state-sponsored and unofficial anti-Semitism became deeply ingrained in the society and remained a fact for years: ordinary Soviet Jews were often not being allowed to enter universities or hired to work in certain professions. Many were barred from participation in the government, and had to bear being openly humiliated.

The official position of the Soviet Union and its satellite states and agencies was that Zionism was a tool used by the Jews and Americans for "racist imperialism." The meaning of the term Zionism was defined by the ruling Communist Party of the Soviet Union: "the main posits of modern Zionism are militant chauvinism, racism, anti-Communism and anti-Sovietism... overt and covert fight against freedom movements and the USSR."

Howard Sachar described the allegations of global Jewish conspiracy resurrected during the Soviet "anti-Zionist" campaign in the wake of the Six-Day War:

"In late July 1967, Moscow launched an unprecedented propaganda campaign against Zionism as a "world threat." Defeat was attributed not to tiny Israel alone, but to an "all-powerful international force." ... In its flagrant vulgarity, the new propaganda assault soon achieved Nazi-era characteristics. The Soviet public was saturated with racist canards. Extracts from Trofim Kichko's notorious 1963 volume, Judaism Without Embellishment, were extensively republished in the Soviet media. Yuri Ivanov's Beware: Zionism, a book essentially replicated The Protocols of the Elders of Zion, was given nationwide coverage."

A similar picture was drawn by Paul Johnson: the mass media "all over the Soviet Union portrayed the Zionists (i.e. Jews) and Israeli leaders as engaged in a world-wide conspiracy along the lines of the old Protocols of Zion. It was, Sovietskaya Latvia wrote 5 August 1967, an 'international Cosa Nostra with a common centre, common programme and common funds'". The Israeli government was also referred to as a "terrorist regime" which "has raised terror to the level of state politics." Even regarding the Entebbe hostage crisis, Soviet media reported: "Israel committed an act of aggression against Uganda, assaulting the Entebbe airport."

In March 1985, Mikhail Gorbachev became the Secretary General of the CPSU; in April, he declared perestroika. It took more than six years before Moscow consented to restore diplomatic relations with Israel on October 19, 1991, just 2 months prior to the collapse of the USSR.

== Six-Day War ==
Although the Soviet Union had adopted a foreign policy of détente, easing of hostility, in the mid-1960s, it played a key role in the instigation of the Six-Day War in Israel. The Soviet Union pursued détente because of the need for economic stability in order to create domestic change. Furthermore, as stated in Leonid Brezhnev's foreign policy speech given to the central committee in December 1966, a key goal of Soviet foreign policy was the consolidation of the post-World War II borders. Thus, it was believed that the Soviet Union should be cautious in its foreign engagement in an attempt to prevent any political instability from reaching Europe.

In the 1950s, the Soviet Union became allies with Egypt and Syria due to the "Anglo-French debacle at Suez, the Arab–Israeli conflict, and the use of the Soviet rouble." Later Egypt and Syria developed a defense treaty, in which if one of them declared war on Israel the other would get involved.

Soviet Relations with Israel had declined since Israel's declaration of independence in 1948. When Levi Eshkol became the Israeli prime minister in 1963, Moscow was nervous, because they weren't sure what direction Eshkol would take in his foreign policy, specifically Soviet-Israeli relations. Initially things seemed to be going better with representatives from Soviet and Israeli governments meeting in June 1965 and January 1966. However, relations soon fell apart. On February 23, 1966, Syria had a military coup, in which the new regime Neo-Ba’ath took a more radical position towards Israel, both in rhetoric and action, supporting Palestinian guerrilla activity against Israel. Disagreements about Israel led to the development of tensions in the Soviet–Syrian relationship, eventually leading to the Soviets' delaying their arms shipments to Syria, and slowing down on the previously promised Euphrates dam loan.

In the 1960s, there were numerous clashes between the Syrians and Israelis on the Syria–Israel border. In October 1966 Palestinian guerrilla operation against Israel intensified. One of the most serious of these incidents occurred on April 7, 1967, when Israel destroyed seven of Syria's modern Soviet MIG planes. Although the Soviets provided the Syrian army with weapons, they made it clear that they wanted to avoid war. After several more Palestinian guerrilla operations, Soviet foreign ministry adopted a "two pronged approach", demanding that Israel stop its aggressive policy toward the Arab countries and telling Iraq, Jordan and Syria that a warning had been sent out and explaining that the Soviet government disproved of any Chinese involvement in the Middle East and the actions of the Palestinian guerrilla organizations.

As tensions between Israel and Syria increased, Israel felt the threat of force was the only deterrent left. On May 12, the Politburo was told that the IDF had formulated a large-scale attack on Syria and was simply waiting for a good time to begin it. A day later, on May 13, 1967, the Soviet's gave the Egyptian President, Gamal Abd al-Nasser an intelligence report that claimed there were Israeli troops gathering on the Syrian border. Dmitri Chuvakhin, Soviet ambassador to Israel, refused an Israeli Invitation to visit the border in order to disprove the report. On May 14, Nasser sent his chief of staff, General Mohamed Fawzi to the border to investigate the report, and was told there were no Israeli troop concentrations. Although, Nasser knew that the Soviet report was wrong, he perhaps interpreted it to indicate Soviet support of an Egyptian offensive towards Israel. On May 15, Nasser sent the Egyptian army to Sinai and on May 18, 1967, Nasser requested that the U.N. Emergency Force (UNEF) withdraw from Egypt. Furthermore, on May 22 he closed the Tiran straits to Israeli ships.

The Israelis interpreted the closing of the straits of Tiran as an act of war, and attacked Egypt on June 5, 1967, destroying hundreds of airplanes. The Soviets reacted to Israel's offensive in two ways. Firstly it severed diplomatic relations with Israel and threatened sanctions if fighting with Syria did not cease immediately. Secondly, it told the White House that unless Israel stopped military operations, the Soviet Union would get involved. In the following six days Israel achieved massive victories, until the war ended on June 10, 1967, with a cease-fire.

The role the USSR played in the June 1967 war, between the State of Israel and the surrounding Arab countries, remains fiercely debated. Some scholars have argued that Moscow started the war in order to further its position in the area and increase Arab reliance on Soviet aid. Expanding on the notion that a key goal of the Soviet Union in the Middle East in the 1960s was to expand its military presence through the procurement of both naval and air bases.

Furthermore, the Soviets chose to involve Egypt in the conflict due to the fear that an incident between Syria and Israel would likely lead to Syria's defeat. Others claim it was due to miscalculations and the Soviets' lack of control over the Arabs. Another theory was that Moscow was attempting to use the Middle East in order to divert attention from Vietnam. Recently a theory has emerged that claims that the main reason for the Soviet move was to demolish Israel's nuclear development before it had obtained a working atomic weapon.

The Soviets also viewed Israel's victory in the 1967 war as damaging to themselves because this one nation had been able to destroy multiple Arab countries that had been supplied with Soviet military hardware, as well as Soviet military expertise to Egyptian and Syrian advisers. The United States' absolute support towards Israel further exacerbated relations between the Soviet Union and Israel which furthered the Soviet Union's decision to break off diplomatic ties to Israel. Other factors included the fact that Israel was considered to be an actively belligerent state towards its neighboring Arab countries that held prominence in the Soviet Union's Middle East agenda.

== See also ==
- Anti-Zionist committee of the Soviet public
- Arab Cold War
- Arms shipments from Czechoslovakia to Israel 1947–49
- History of the Jews in Russia and the Soviet Union
- Refusenik
- Russia and the Arab–Israeli conflict
- Russia and the Iran–Israel proxy conflict
- Soviet anti-Zionism
