= Gennady Kostyrchenko =

Soviet and Russian historian (born 1954)

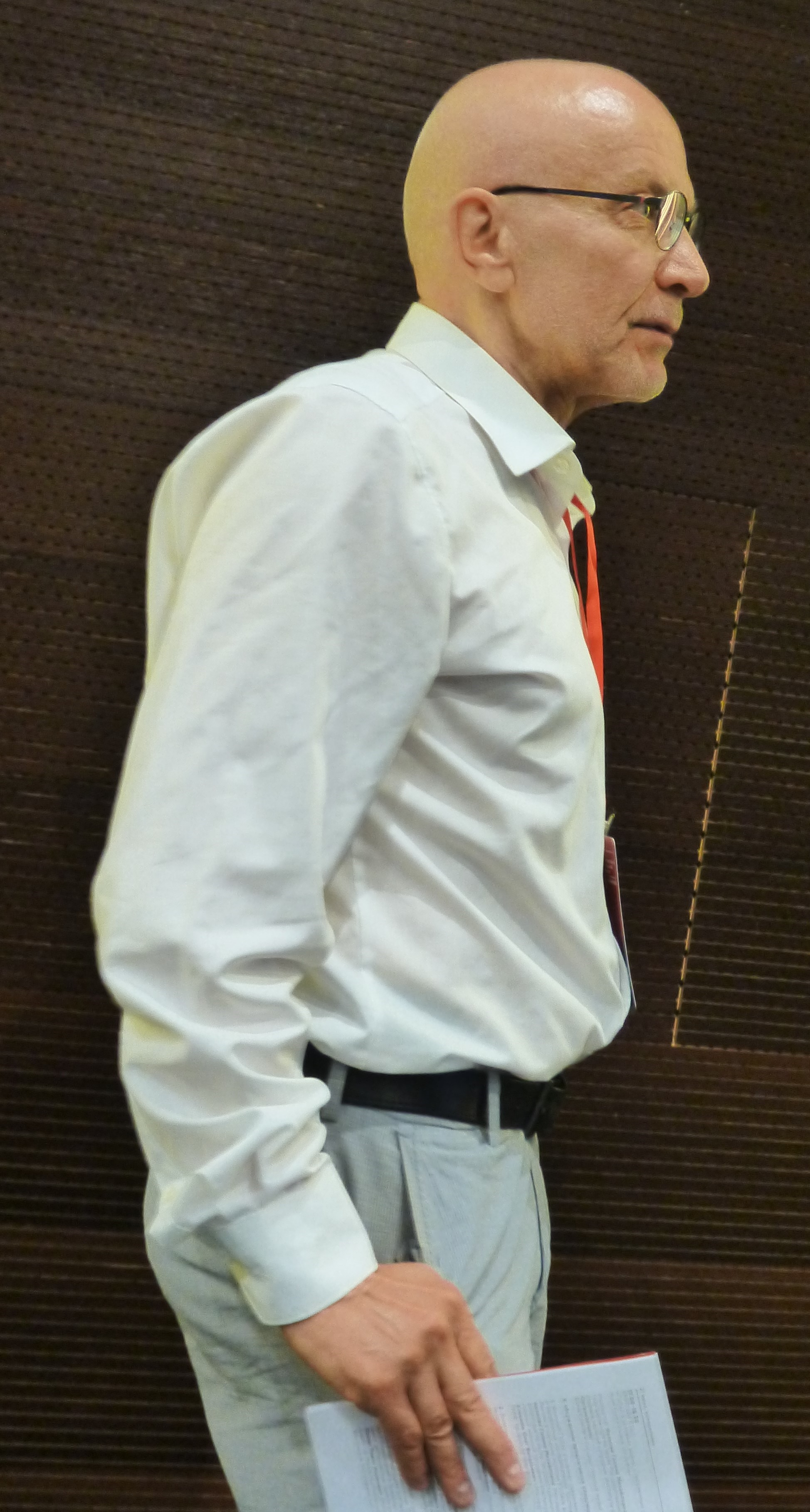
Gennady Kostyrchenko, 2021

Gennady Vasilyevich Kostyrchenko (Костырченко, Геннадий Васильевич) (born 1954) is a Soviet and Russian historian, specializing in Soviet politics and national relations.

In 1988, he defended his candidate's dissertation titled "The People's Commissariat of the Aviation Industry on the Eve and During the Great Patriotic War (1939–1945)." In 2008, he defended his doctoral dissertation on The Political Leadership of the USSR and the Jewish Intelligentsia (1936–1953)

He worked at the Ministry of Aviation Industry, the Institute of Marxism-Leninism under the Central Committee of the CPSU, and after 1991, at the Russian Center for Preservation and Study of Documents of Contemporary History (Federal Archival Agency). He currently works as a senior researcher at the Institute of Russian History of the Russian Academy of Sciences.

In 2003 Kostyrchenko was pronounced "Man of the Year 5762" by the Federation of Jewish Communities of Russia for his book "Тайная политика Сталина. Власть и антисемитизм" (Stalin's Secret Politics. Power and anti-Semitism).

== Books ==
- В плену у красного фараона. Политические преследования евреев в последнее сталинское десятилетие. Moscow, Mezhdunarodnye otnosheniya, 1994.
  - Out of the Red Shadows: Anti-Semitism in Stalin’s Russia. Amherst, MA: Prometheus Books, 1995. —English edition of В плену у красного фараона.
- Тайная политика Сталина. Власть и антисемитизм. Moscow, Mezhdunarodnye otnosheniya, 2001. Second revised and expanded edition: 2003.
- Сталин против «космополитов». Власть и еврейская интеллигенция в СССР. Moscow, ROSSPEN, 2009.
- Тайная политика Хрущёва: власть, интеллигенция, еврейский вопрос. Moscow, Mezhdunarodnye otnosheniya, 2012.
- Тайная политика: от Брежнева до Горбачева Moscow, Mezhdunarodnye otnosheniya, 2019.
