= Lavrentiy Tsanava =

Soviet politician and lieutenant general

- Лаврентий Фомич Цанава (Russian) ლავრენტი ცანავა (Georgian)

Minister of State Security of the Belarusian Soviet Socialist Republic
- In office 15 March 1946 – 29 October 1951
- Preceded by: Himself (as People's Commissar of State Security)
- Succeeded by: Mikhial Baskakov

People's Commissar of State Security of the Belarusian Soviet Socialist Republic
- In office 7 May 1943 – 15 March 1946
- Preceded by: Office established
- Succeeded by: Office abolished
- In office 26 February 1941 – 31 July 1941
- Preceded by: Office established
- Succeeded by: Office abolished

People's Commissar of Internal Affairs of the Belarusian Soviet Socialist Republic
- In office 17 December 1938 – 26 February 1941
- Preceded by: Alexei Nasedkin
- Succeeded by: Aleksandr Matveyev

Personal details
- Born: Lavrentiy Fomich Janjghava; 9 August 1900 Nakhunavo, Kutais Governorate, Russian Empire
- Died: 12 October 1955 (aged 55) Moscow, Russian SFSR, Soviet Union
- Party: Communist Party of the Soviet Union

Military service
- Allegiance: Russian Soviet Federative Socialist Republic (1921–1922); Soviet Union (1922–1953)
- Branch/service: Cheka; GPU; OGPU; NKVD; NKGB; MGB
- Years of service: 1921 – 1953
- Rank: Lieutenant general
- Battles/wars: World War II

Lavrentiy Fomich Tsanava (Russian: Лаврентий Фомич Цанава; Georgian: ლავრენტი ცანავა), born Lavrentiy Janjghava (Russian: Лаврентий Джанджгава; Georgian: ლავრენტი ჯანჯღავა; 9 August 1900 – 12 October 1955), was a Soviet politician and lieutenant general who served as the head of the Committee for State Security of the Belarusian Soviet Socialist Republic (NKVD) from 1941 until 1951. A close confidant of Lavrentiy Beria, and likewise an ethnic Mingrelian, he was arrested after the death of Joseph Stalin and died in prison awaiting a trial.

== Career ==
Lavrentiy Tsanava was born in Nakhunavo, in the Kutaisi region of Georgia. He joined the communist party, aged 20, in August 1920 when Georgia was an independent republic governed by Mensheviks. After the Red Army invasion of Georgia, he joined the newly Georgian branch of Cheka. According to an investigation conducted 33 years later:

In August 1922, acting as the head of the Politburo of the Cheka in the Telavi district of Georgia, Tsanava, who then bore the surname Janjgava, abused his official position and, in addition, kidnapped a girl with a weapon. For these crimes, by the decision of the Special Commission under the Presidium of the All-Georgian Central Executive Committee, approved by the Presidium of the CEC, Tsanava was sentenced to imprisonment "in forced labor camps for a period of 5 years with strict isolation." For some time, Tsanava was held in custody, but then disappeared.

After his 'disappearance', Beria interceded on his behalf, and had his conviction overturned, and in 1925, he was allowed to resume police work as an officer of what was now the OGPU. After Beria's appointment as first secretary of the Georgian communist party, in 1931, Tsanava was transferred to economic work, initially as Georgia's Deputy People's Commissar for State Farms. In December 1938, after Beria had moved to Moscow and taken control of the NKVD (successor to the OGPU), Tsanava was appointed People's Commissar for Internal Affairs of the Byelorussian NKVD.

In 1944–1945, as the Soviet army recaptured territory that had been under Nazi occupation, Tsanava was in charge of wiping out guerilla groups who resisted the return of Soviet rule in Byelorussia, and together with Viktor Abakumov, supervised the ethnic cleansing in the Lublin and Łódź regions of Poland, from which tens of thousands of Belarusians, Ukrainians and Lithuanians were deported and replaced by Poles forcibly transported into the area.

Tsanava remained in office after Abakumov took over from Beria and most of the Georgians who held high office in what was now the MGB were sacked. In January 1948, Tsanava received an order that came from Joseph Stalin via Abakumov's deputy, Sergei Ogoltsov, to murder the renowned Jewish actor, Solomon Mikhoels. Mikhoels, who was visiting Minsk, was lured to Tsanava's dacha, and stabbed with a poison needle. The cause of death was officially registered as a traffic accident.

Tsanava was recalled to Moscow late in 1951, after Abakumov had been arrested, and was dismissed from the MGB in 1952. After Stalin's death, in March 1953, Beria regained control of the police, opened an investigation into the death of Mikhoels, and in April had Ogoltsov and Tsanava arrested and charged with murder. In July, unaware that Beria had been arrested, Tsanava sent him a letter praising him and promising not to "spare himself" in carrying out Beria's orders. But in August 1953, he wrote a letter from Butyrka prison hospital pleading for his release, claiming that he had been victimised as an act of revenge "on the part of enemy of the people Beria and his inner circle". But he was held in prison, and an investigation completed on 10 October 1955 charged him with a long list of abuses, in which innocent people were arrested, some were tortured, and were either executed or sentenced to long terms in labour camps. He was also accused of having boasted of his close connection with Beria. Beria appears to have helped Tsanava's son and a friend escape justice after they had raped a girl. However, a note from the prosecutor said that Tsanava was in hospital, too ill to stand trial. He died on 12 October 1955.

== Bibliography ==
- Knight, Amy W. (1993), Beria: Stalin's First Lieutenant, Princeton, New Jersey: Princeton University Press, ISBN 0-691-01093-5
- Rayfield, Donald (2012), Edge of Empires: A History of Georgia, London: Reaktion Books, ISBN 978-1-78-023030-6
