= Mikhail Likhachev =

Soviet military officer (1913–1954)

- Михаил Лихачёв
- Born: Missing required parameter 1=month! , 1913; Panino, Danilovsky District, Russian Empire
- Died: 19 December 1954 (aged 40–41); Leningrad
- Burial place: Levashovo Memorial Cemetery
- Military career
- Allegiance: Soviet Union
- Branch: NKVD; Ministry of State Security
- Service years: 1932-1951
- Rank: Polkovnik
- Conflicts: World War II
- Awards: Order of the Red Banner; Order of the Patriotic War; Order of the Red Star

Mikhail Timofeyevich Likhachev (Russian: Михаил Тимофеевич Лихачёв; 1913 – 19 December 1954) was an officer in the Soviet Ministry of State Security (MGB) who led the team of Soviet investigators at the Nuremberg trials of Nazi war criminals, and was executed for his role in fabricating criminal cases against prominent Soviet citizens, including the wartime heads of the Soviet air force.

== Career ==
A Russian, he joined the NKVD in 1937, during the Great Purge. After the German invasion of the USSR, he was assigned to the Directorate of Special Departments (UOO), headed by Viktor Abakumov, and by February 1942 was its deputy head. When the UOO was absorbed into SMERSH, in 1942 or 1943, Likhachev was appointed deputy head of the Sixth Department.

During the war, Likhachev was responsible for interrogating high level German prisoners of war, using translators, because he spoke no German. They included Hans Fritzsche, who was arrested in Berlin in May 1945 and flown to Moscow, where Likhachev induced him to sign a deposition that was to be used as evidence in Nuremberg, but once there, Fritzsche declared that the entire deposition was fabrication that he had signed after being interrogated for three days and nights. Fritzsche was acquitted. Likhachev also interrogated Hans Frank, but according to a memoir written later by his translator, all he did was read out a list of questions written in a piece of paper.

On 18 December 1945, Likhachev's driver, corporal Ivan Buben, was shot while he was in a car outside the Grand Hotel in Nuremberg, waiting to collect Likhachev, who was having dinner in the hotel. Soviet officials claimed that the killer was dressed in an American army uniform. No one was charged with the murder, and the motive is unknown, but one rumour was that the assassin thought the driver was Likhachev, the intended target.

On 22 May 1946, Nikolai Zorya, assistant to the Soviet chief prosecutor, was found dead in his Nuremberg apartment. The official explanation was that he accidentally shot himself, though it is more likely that he had killed himself, having failed to convince the international court that the massacre of thousands of Polish officers in Katyn forest had been perpetrated by the Germans, not the NKVD. Likhachev spread a rumour that Stalin had said, of Zorya, "Bury him like a dog."

Likhachev was recalled to Moscow shortly after Zorya's death. A fellow officer, Lev Sheinin later claimed that Likhachev had forced a young interpreter to cohabit, and when she became pregnant, made her have an abortion. He spent ten days under arrest as a punishment, but then was allowed to return to work in the police force.

Despite this temporary disgrace, he returned to his former position as Deputy Head of the investigative unit, and assisted Abakumov in fabricating a case against the former Minister for Aviation, Aleksey Shakhurin and the former Chief Marshal of Aviation Alexander Novikov, and three others who were arrested in April 1946, subjected to round the clock interrogation, and forced to confess to supplying the Soviet air force with sub-standard equipment.

In 1948, he was assigned to the investigation of the former members of the Jewish Anti-Fascist committee, who were suspected of sympathising with the newly created state of Israel. When the poet Itzik Feffer was arrested, Likhachev told him: "If we arrested you, that mean we will find a crime. We will 'beat out' of you everything we need." He also interrogated Polina Zhemchuzhina, the Jewish wife of the Foreign Minister, Vyacheslav Molotov, who was arrested in December 1948.

In 1949, Likhachev was posted in Budapest, to act as an adviser to the Hungarian State Protection Authority on preparing for the show trial of László Rajk. On 23 September, he arrived in Prague to act as an adviser in the hunt for a 'Czechoslovak Rajk'. Within days of his arrival, a dozen middle ranking communists had been arrested, and their Czech interrogators had been instructed to force confessions out of them. This was the start of the purge that culminated in the 1952 Slansky trial. Likhachev was recalled to Moscow late in 1949.

== Arrest and Execution ==
On 18 November 1950, the MGB arrested an elderly Jewish doctor, Yakov Etinger, who was accused of being a Zionist agent and enemy of the Soviet government. This was the start of the episode known as the Doctors' plot. Likhachev was in overall charge of the investigation, but assigned a junior officer, Mikhail Ryumin, to lead the interrogation of Etinger. Ryumin claimed to have extracted a confession from Etinger that he had poisoned the former Moscow party boss, Aleksandr Shcherbakov, who had died of natural causes in 1945. Likhachev then questioned Etinger, but considered his responses too confused to be of any value. He reported to Abakumov, who backed Likhachev.

In March 1951, Etinger died of a heart attack without having signed a protocol on which the MGB could build a case. Likhachev proposed that Ryumin should be disciplined for this failure. Ryumin retaliated by denouncing Abakumov and Likhachev for allegedly covering-up Shcherbakov's 'murder'. A Politburo Commission was appointed to investigate. In a memorandum to the commission, on 6 July 1951, Likhachev admitted:

I have been on investigative work in the MGB for 11 years. During this time, I have carried out a number of evaluations of the management of complex and important investigative cases. In particular, I interrogated the arrested Shakhurin, Novikov, Fefer, Zhemchuzhina and others, always reacted sharply to the testimony of those under investigation and, as it seemed to me, correctly and completely exposed their criminal activities and connections. But in this case, I doubted the veracity of Etinger's testimony. I will not make excuses ... I may have made a mistake.

On 11 July, the Commission came down in Ryumin's favour, and ruled that Akabumov, Likhachev and another senior MGB officer, Aleksandr Leonov, should be dismissed, and expelled from the communist party. Likhachev was arrested in October and under pressure from Ryumin, he signed a statement saying that Etinger had indeed confessed to murdering Shcherbakov.

After the death of Stalin, in March 1953, Lavrentiy Beria regained control of the MGB. The Doctors' plot was denounced as a fabrication, and Ryumin was arrested, but Likhachev remained under arrest because on 18 March, Beria ordered a review of the case against Shakhurin and the others; and on 12 May, he submitted a note to the party leadership accusing Likhachev of having tried to force Polina Zhemchuzhina to confess to crimes she had not committed.; and in another note, on 26 May, he named Likhachev as one of the officers who had fabricated the case against Shakhurin and the others.

The investigation of Likhachev continued although Beria was arrested in July. He was tried alongside Abakumov and four others in December 1954. The announcement in Pravda on 24 December said that he had been convicted of forcing innocent victims to make false confessions, and had been sentenced to death and shot.
