= Semyon Ignatiev =

Soviet politician (1904–1983)

- Семён Игнатьев

Minister of State Security
- In office 9 August 1951 – 5 March 1953
- Preceded by: Sergei Ogoltsov
- Succeeded by: Lavrentiy Beria

Full member of the 19th Presidium
- In office 16 October 1952 – 5 March 1953

Member of the 19th Secretariat
- In office 5 March 1953 – 5 April 1953

Personal details
- Born: 14 September 1904 Karlivka, Kherson Governorate, Russian Empire
- Died: 27 November 1983 (aged 79) Moscow, Soviet Union
- Party: Communist Party of the Soviet Union (1926–1961)

Semyon Denisovich Ignatiev (Russian: Семён Денисович Игнатьев; 14 September 1904 – 27 November 1983) was a Soviet politician, and the last head of the secret police appointed by Joseph Stalin.

== Early career ==
Ignatiev was the son of a peasant family of Ukrainian ethnicity. When he was ten, his parents moved to Uzbekistan, and he learnt to speak Uzbek. After the Bolshevik Revolution, he joined Komsomol and became a trade union organiser in Bukhara and an engineer, joined the Communist Party in 1926. For most of his career, he was a discreet regional apparatchik in the border republics of the USSR. In 1934–1938, he worked in the central party apparatus in Moscow, but received sudden promotion in 1938, as a result of the Great Purge, when he was appointed First Secretary of the communist party in the Buryat ASSR. He was subsequently First Secretary in the Bashkir ASSR, in 1944–1946, and served in senior party posts in the Dagestan ASSR, and Uzbekistan. In May or June 1946, he was summoned to Moscow to act as an inspector of party organisations, on the recommendation of Nikolai Patolichev, who had taken over as a party secretary. In March 1947, he was appointed a secretary of the communist party of Belorussia, responsible for agriculture, but was removed early in 1950, and posted to Uzbekistan.

== Head of Security ==
In December 1950, Ignatiev was recalled to Moscow and appointed head of the department of the Central Committee of the Communist Party of the Soviet Union that supervised party, Komsomol and trade union personnel, and given the task of investigating the Minister of State Security (MGB—forerunner of the KGB), Viktor Abakumov, who had been accused of corruption by a rival, Ivan Serov When Abakumov was dismissed and arrested, in July 1951, Ignatiev was originally appointed representative of the Central Committee in the MGB. On 9 August 1951, he was appointed Minister of State Security. He was a member of the Central Committee of the Communist Party of the Soviet Union from 1952 until 1961. He also briefly served as a member of the Presidium of the Central Committee (previously named Politburo) in the final months before Stalin's demise.

Ignatiev's first task was to purge the security apparatus. In just over a year, he had 42,000 MGB officers sacked. His tenure as its head coincided with the anti-semitic campaign that began with the arrests of every known Jew employed by the MGB—Lev Shvartzman, Leonid Eitingon, Leonid Raikhman, Andrei Sverdlov, son of Yakov Sverdlov, and many more—and culminated in the infamous Doctors' plot.

On 5 March 1953, after Stalin's death, Ignatiev was removed from his post in the MGB, as Beria absorbed the MGB into his MVD, and was appointed a Secretary of the Central Committee. In April, it was announced in Pravda and other newspapers that the Doctors' Plot had been a miscarriage of justice and that Ignatiev had been guilty of "political blindness and ignorance" in allowing it to happen.

== Role in the antisemitic purge ==
Ignatiev's subordinate, Mikhail Ryumin, was charged with being the main instigator of the Doctors' Plot, for which he was shot. At the same time, it was Ignatiev's good fortune to be the first former head of the security services in almost 30 years to escape being arrested and executed—the fate suffered by Genrikh Yagoda, Nikolai Yezhov, Vsevolod Merkulov, Beria and Abakumov. In later life, Ignatiev would claim that he was never really involved in the Doctors' Plot, except to pass messages between Stalin and Ryumin, and that Stalin had repeatedly threatened to have him killed if he did not obey orders. Nikita Khrushchev evidently believed him. In the famous Secret Speech that he delivered in 1956 to the 20th Congress of the Soviet Communist Party, in which he exposed Stain's crimes for the first time, Khrushchev remarked: "Present at this Congress as a delegate is the former Minister of State Security Comrade Ignatiev. Stalin told him curtly, 'If you do not obtain confessions from the doctors we will shorten you by a head'." In his memoirs, Khrushchev claimed:

I knew Ignatiev well, and I knew he was a very sick man. He had had a near fatal heart attack. He was mild, considerate and well-liked. We all knew what sort of physical condition he was in. Stalin was crazy with rage, yelling at Ignatiev and threatening him, demanding that he throw the doctors in chains, beat them to pulp, and grind them into powder.

By contrast, the former MGB officer, Pavel Sudoplatov, asserted that "at the peak of the antisemitic campaign, not Ryumin but Mesetsov, Konyatkin and Ignatiev were in charge of the criminal investigation and the beating of the doctors" He described Mesetsov and Konyatkin, who was Ryumin's deputy, as "incompetent". Ryumin was sacked in November 1952, while Ignatiev remained in office, though he collapsed on 14 November 1952 after transmitting a direct order from Stalin that the prisoners would be tortured. He may have been reluctant to have the instruction carried out, but the historians Jonathan Brent and Vladimir Naumov have noted that "Ignatiev's malaise and exhaustion did not prevent him from slavish obedience."

Sudoplatov also alleged that Ignatiev planned to carry out assassinations in Germany and Paris of elderly opponents of the Soviet regime, including exiled Mensheviks and a Ukrainian nationalist who "was in this seventies, no longer active, but Ignatiev's group was eager to report his liquidation to impress the government." Other planned targets for assassination allegedly included Josip Broz Tito and Alexander Kerensky.

== Later career ==
In February 1954, Ignatiev was reappointed to the post of First secretary in the Bashkir republic, which he had held ten years earlier. In June 1957-October 1960, he was head of the communist party in Tatarstan. Tatar historian credit him with having lobbied Moscow in 1958 to revive the Tatar language. According to one historian, Rimzil Valeyev "no other party leader cared for the Tatar language and culture as fundamentally and effectively as Ignatiev did in 1957–1960"—partly because no other party official in Tatarstan had Ignatiev's experience of high level politics in Moscow.

Ignatiev retired "for health reasons" in 1961. He died of natural causes in 1983 and was buried in the Novodevichy Cemetery in Moscow, along with many members of the Soviet elite.
