= Sergei Ogoltsov =

Soviet Intelligence Officer (1900–1976)

- Серге́й Огольцо́в

Acting Minister of State Security
- In office 14 July 1951 – 9 August 1951
- Preceded by: Viktor Abakumov
- Succeeded by: Semyon Ignatiev

1st Deputy People's Commissar/Minister of State Security
- In office December 4 1945 – May 7 1946
- In office August 26 1951 – February 13 1952
- In office November 20 1952 – March 11 1953

Deputy Minister of State Security for General Issues
- In office May 7 1946 – August 26 1951

Minister of State Security of the Uzbek SSR
- In office February 15 1952 – November 20 1952
- Preceded by: Sergo Goglidze
- Succeeded by: Kurban Ruzmetov

People's Commissariat of State Security of the Kazakh SSR
- In office 1944–1945
- Preceded by: Alexey Babkin
- Succeeded by: Alexey Byzov

Personal details
- Born: 29 August 1900 Kanino, Ryazan Governorate, Russian Empire
- Died: 30 December 1976 (aged 76) Moscow, Russian SFSR, Soviet Union
- Party: Communist Party of the Soviet Union (1919–1958)

Military service
- Allegiance: RSFSR (1918–1922); Soviet Union (1922–1954)
- Branch/service: Cheka; GPU; OGPU; NKVD; NKGB; MGB; MVD
- Years of service: 1918–1954
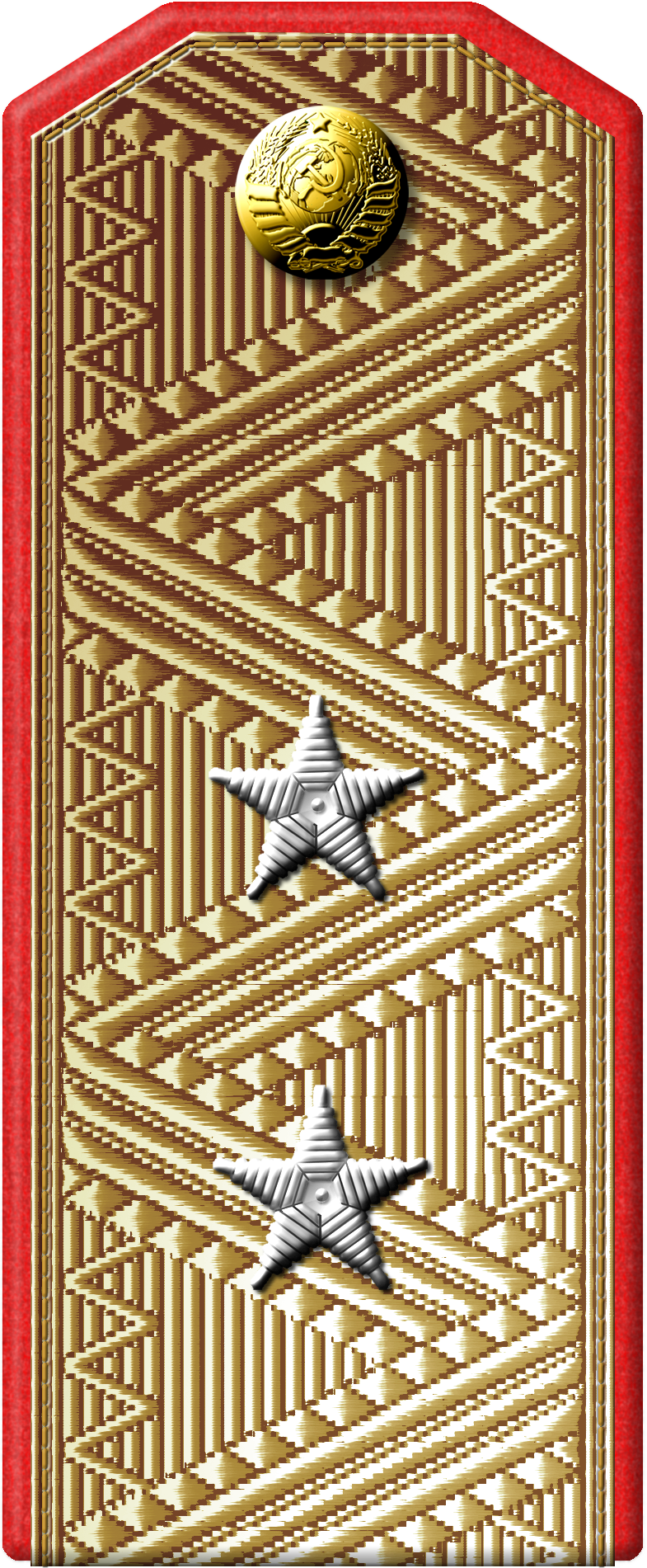
- Rank: Lieutenant general
- Commands: 14 Infantry Corps-Special Branch (Kyiv); 22nd Volochisskogo Border Unit (Ukraine); 26th Border Detachment (Odesa); 27th Border Detachment (Sevastopol); 4th Border Guard Detachment (Arkhangelsk)
- Battles/wars: Russian Civil War; World War II

Sergei Ivanovich Ogoltsov (Russian: Сергей Иванович Огольцов; 29 August 1900 – 30 December 1976) was a Soviet state security official who served as a Deputy Minister of State Security from 1946 to 1953.

== Early life and education ==
Sergei Ivanovich Ogoltsov was born on 29 August 1900 in Kanino village in Sapozhkovsky Uyezd of Ryazan Governorate in a peasant family of Russian ethnicity. In 1916 he graduated from a two-class primary school and continued his training as an apprentice of a parish clerk in the villages of Ukolovo and Prigorod. In October 1917 he became secretary of the parish executive committee, a post he held until joining the state security system in May 1918.

In 1919 he joined the Russian Communist Party (Bolsheviks).

In 1925 he was sent to study in the Higher Border Guard School of the Joint State Political Directorate (OGPU) that he graduated in 1927.

== Career in state security ==
Just 17 years old, he started his career in Cheka, working from May to October 1918 as a secretary of a bureau combating profiteering. In October 1918 he was promoted to an investigator and in March 1919 became the deputy head of a bureau combating counter-revolution. In June 1919 he was transferred from the Sapozhkovsky Uyezd office to the Ryazan Governorate office, where he advanced fast – from operative commissar of search and seizure to the head of weaponry bureau to the assistant of the Cheka plenipotentiary in Ranenburgsky Uyezd. He also participated in combat activities against the units of the Cossack general Konstantin Mamontov. Although Ogoltsov could barely read, he was apparently very effective in finding "counter-revolutionary literature" during his search and seizure operations and soon his name was brought to the attention of Cheka top executives.

In April 1920 he was transferred to Moscow, where he served as a commissar of search and seizure under direct supervision of Felix Dzerzhinsky's first deputy Ivan Ksenofontov. In May he was part of the team of security officers who accompanied Dzerzhinsky to Ukraine, where Ogoltsov remained for the next five years. From June 1920 he held various security posts in Poltava Governorate, becoming by the end of the year deputy head of the department combating banditry. In January 1921 he was appointed the head of Cheka in Lokhvytsky Uyezd and in 1922, after Cheka had been renamed the State Political Directorate (GPU), one of the plenipotentiaries in Poltava Governorate.

In 1923, Ogoltsov became the Inspector for the Special Branch 14 Infantry Corps based in Kiev. His command was continually transferred in the 1930s to different units within Ukraine, including the 22nd Volochisskogo NKVD border unit, the 26th NKVD border detachment in Odessa, and the 27th NKVD border unit in Sevastopol. He was promoted to the commander officer of the 27th Crimean NKVD border group in 1936.

After spending most of the 1930s in Ukraine among various NKVD border units, he joined the NKVD administration in Leningrad in 1939. For the next few years he spent time in Leningrad and Kuibyshev until he was made the Commissar of State Security of the Kazakh SSR in 1944. While at this position, Ogoltsov participated in the deportation of many Soviet peoples to the Kazakh SSR. From 1945 he served as the Deputy Minister of State Security of the USSR (until 1946 Deputy People's Commissar of State Security).

In 1951 Ogoltsov was appointed the 1st Deputy Minister of State Security of the USSR. Joseph Stalin then nominated Ogoltsov for Minister of State Security after the removal of Vsevolod Nikolayevich Merkulov, but he initially refused, citing a lack of knowledge and experience. In 1952 Ogoltsov served as the Minister of Public Security in Uzbekistan and then became the Head of Main Intelligence Directorate of the MVD. His final position was as the First Deputy Minister of State Security.

=== Coordinated operations ===
In early 1920s Ogoltsov coordinated the operations against Ukrainian nationalists and anarchists, including the units of Nestor Makhno, in Poltava Governorate. His strategy was simple: a number of people from villages supporting the counter-revolutionaries were taken hostage and if the villagers refused to reveal the locations of counter-revolutionary units, the hostages were executed. The discovered units were completely annihilated as Ogoltsov had given a command not to take any prisoners in armed combat.

As the head of NKVD in Kuybyshev Ogoltsov was in charge of execution of a Polish-Jewish social and political activist Victor Alter. Alter and his colleague Henryk Ehrlich had been arrested already in 1939 after the invasion of Poland and accused of activities against the Communist movement in Poland, but pardoned in August 1941. However, in December 1941 they were again detained with no reason given for their arrest. In December 1941 they were sentenced to death behind their back as traitors. Ehrlich managed to commit suicide in prison in May 1942 but Alter was executed in February 1943. An official report to the Deputy People's Commissar of the NKVD Vsevolod Merkulov on the execution of Alter, signed by Ogoltsov, has been preserved.

As the Deputy Minister of State Security of the USSR (1946–1951) Ogoltsov was the ministry level coordinator of several mass deportations in the Soviet Union. In October 1947 he and the Ukrainian Minister of State Security Sergei Savchenko coordinated operation West (in Russian Zapad), removing a large number of people (according to the official statistics 77,791 persons) accused of nationalism and banditry, along with their family members from Western Ukraine. In May 1948 he was the general coordinator for operation Spring (in Russian Vesna) in Lithuanian SSR, deporting, according to the official statistics, 39,482 people, along with their family members, accused of nationalism, banditry and being kulaks. In 1949 he was in charge of operation Breaking Wave (in Russian Priboy) directed against the three Baltic republics of the USSR – Estonian SSR, Latvian SSR and Lithuanian SSR. The deportations took place simultaneously in all three Soviet republics on 25 March 1949 and resulted in total of 94,775 people removed from these territories.

In the same role he also coordinated the murder of Jewish actor and producer Solomon Mikhoels in 1948 in Minsk, Belarus. Robert Conquest, a British historian and author, wrote in his book Reflections on a Ravaged Century that Mikhoels "was clubbed to death at Belorussia's KGB dacha in January 1948 under the supervision of Stalin's Deputy Minister of State Security, Sergei Ogoltsov." According to some sources Ogoltsov was picked for the operation personally by Joseph Stalin. For successful execution of the operation he was awarded his third Order of the Red Banner. When Lavrenti Beria came to power in 1953 and revised the antisemitic policies of Stalin's last years, Ogoltsov was arrested due to his involvement in Mikhoels' murder and stripped of the order awarded to him in 1948.

== Retirement ==
After Stalin's death, Ogoltsov was removed from his position as the First Deputy Minister of State Security by Beria and arrested on 3 April 1953 for the murder of Solomon Mikhoels. Soon after Beria was removed from power Ogoltsov was released on 6 August 1953 and appointed to the personnel department of the Ministry of State Security. However, already in January 1954 he was retired from active duty. On 14 February 1958 he was also excluded from the Communist Party of the Soviet Union for fabricating cases against professors in Leningrad universities in 1940s. On 8 June 1959 he was stripped of his rank and all state decorations.

He died on 30 December 1976 and was buried at the Vagankovo Cemetery in Moscow.

== List of offices ==
- Feb–Jun 1927 Assistant to the Head of the OGPU Special Department at the 15th Rifle Division
- 1927–1929 Head of the OGPU Special Department at the 1st Cavalry Division and Deputy Head of the OGPU Special Department at the 1st Cavalry Corps
- Feb–Jun 1929 Head of the OGPU Special Department at the 96th Rifle Division and Deputy Head of the OGPU Special Department at the 17th Rifle Corps
- Jun–Dec 1929 Head of the OGPU Special Department at the 95th Rifle Division
- 1929–1930 Head of the OGPU Special Department at the 44th Rifle Division and Deputy Head of the OGPU Special Department at the 8th Rifle Corps
- 1930–1932 Assistant to the Head of the OGPU Special Department in the Zhytomyr region, Ukrainian SSR
- 1932–1934 Head of the OGPU Special Department at the 99th Rifle Division
- 1934–1935 Head of the OGPU Special Department at the 30th Rifle Division and Assistant to the Head of the OGPU Special Department at the 7th Rifle Corps
- Sep–Dec 1935 Deputy Commanding Officer of the NKVD Border Group in Volochysk, Ukrainian SSR
- 1935–1936 Chief of Staff of the NKVD Border Detachment in Odessa, Ukrainian SSR
- 1936–1938 Commanding Officer of the 27th NKVD Border Detachment in Crimea
- 1938–1939 Commanding Officer of the 4th NKVD Border Detachment in Arkhangelsk
- 1939–1941 Head of NKVD in Leningrad
- Mar–Jul 1941 Deputy Head of NKGB in Leningrad Oblast
- 1941–1942 Deputy Head of NKVD in Leningrad Oblast
- 1942–1943 Head of NKVD in Kuybyshev Oblast
- 1943–1944 Head of NKGB in Kuybyshev Oblast
- 1944–1945 People's Commissar of State Security of Kazakh SSR
- 1945–1946 First Deputy Commissar of State Security of the Soviet Union
- Mar–May 1946 First Deputy Minister of State Security of the Soviet Union
- 1946–1951 Deputy Minister of State Security of the Soviet Union in general matters
- 1951–1952 First Deputy Minister of State Security of the Soviet Union
- Feb–Nov 1952 Minister of State Security of Uzbek SSR
- 1952–1953 First Deputy Minister of State Security of the Soviet Union
- Jan–Mar 1953 Head of GRU of the Ministry of State Security of the Soviet Union
- 1953–1954 employee in the personnel department of the Ministry of State Security of the Soviet Union

== Ranks ==
In the last 15 years of his career in state security Ogoltsov held the following military ranks:

- Major (3 April 1939)
- Major of State Security (21 April 1939)
- Senior Major of State Security (7 April 1940)
- Commissar of State Security, 3rd class (14 February 1943)
- Lieutenant General (9 July 1945)

== Honours and awards ==
During his career in state security Ogoltsov was awarded the following state decorations:

- Jubilee Medal "XX Years of the Workers' and Peasants' Red Army" (22 February 1938)
- Order of the Red Star (twice – 26 April 1940, 20 September 1943)
- Order of the Red Banner (thrice – 18 May 1942, 3 November 1944, 29 October 1948)
- Order of Kutuzov, 2nd class (8 March 1944)
- Order of Lenin (21 February 1945)
- Order of the Patriotic War, 1st class (16 November 1945)

== Personality and family ==
Russian journalist Leonid Mlechin has written about Ogoltsov in his book History of the Foreign Intelligence Service. Career and Destiny. He writes: "Of all the deputies Abakumov had, Ogoltsov left an impression being the most reasonable and businesslike. He also seemed less tainted by dirty affairs than the others until it became known what he had actually done. Ogoltsov was the head of the operation to murder the artistic director of the State Jewish Theatre Solomon Mikhailovich Mikhoels in January 1948."

Ogoltsov had at least one daughter, Nataliya (died in 1994).

== See also ==
- World War II crimes in Poland
- NKVD prisoner massacres
- Population transfer in the Soviet Union
- Stalin and antisemitism
