= Domna Anisimova =

Domna Anisimovna Anisimova (Russian: До́мна Ани́симовна Ани́симова, IPA: [ˈdomnə ɐˈnʲisʲɪməvnə ɐˈnʲisʲɪməvə]; fl. 19th century), known as Blind Domna, was a blind and illiterate but accomplished 19th-century Russian poet. Her last name is also sometimes given as Onisimova (Russian: Онисимова).

== Biography ==
Anisimova was born in the village of Degtyanom in the Spassky District of Ryazan Province, the daughter of a sexton in the local village Orthodox church. According to one source she was born in 1808, according to another source in 1812.

At the age of five Anisimova was stricken with smallpox, which left her nearly blind; she could only distinguish day from night and dark colors from bright. Her blindness alienated her from normal society. She loved solitude and old stories about the past, as well as being read books, and worship.

From an early age she loved to be read to, but at first had no cause to hear works except church books, sermons, ancient stories, and fairy tales. But when a new young priest, Sergei Ivanov, was assigned to her village, he became friendly with Anisimova and began to read some later works, especially the work of contemporary poets.

She was read "Twelve Sleeping Virgins" by Vasily Zhukovsky; this ballad made such an impression on her that she was deprived of sleep and was inspired with a great desire to compose poetry, which she soon began to do, dictating poems to her brother.

Her first experiments were "Lullaby" and "Sound of the Night Wind". Donma tried to hide her creations, but they came to the attention of the county police chief, who asked Anisimova to expound on the village harvests. One night she composed a rather long poem, "Depiction of the Harvest".

Rumors about Anisimova's work spread throughout the Spassky district and came to the attention of the provincial governor, who informed Dmitry Bludov, the Minister of Internal Affairs and later president of the St. Petersburg Academy of Sciences, who was a man with a considerable interest in and knowledge of literature.

Bludov sent some of Anisimova's work to Admiral Alexander Shishkov, the president of the Russian Academy and a philologist and literary critic. The Academy decided to encourage Anisimova and sent her one hundred rubles and some books (Heinrich Zschokke's Hours of Devotion, Nikolay Karamzin's 12-volume History of the Russian State, and others), published an edition of her poems, and arranged for her to be given disability subsidy of 40 rubles a month for her blindness, which she was to receive for the rest of her life.

The collection of poems published by the Academy under the title Poems by Miss Onisimova, the Blind Daughter of a Village Sexton (St. Petersburg, 1838) included "Sound of the Night Wind", "On the Death of a Friend", "Lullaby", "On the Birth of a Child", "To a Faded Flower", "Greeting", and "Depiction of the Harvest", and prefaces by Bludov and Shishkov.

About fifteen of her poems were published in the Ryazan Diocesan Gazette, and some of her poems were published in the literary newspaper Northern Bee.

Little information on the last years of her life has survived, and her death date is unknown.
