= Andrey Goncharov =

Russian theatre director (1918–2001)

- Андрей Гончаров
- Born: 2 January 1918; Sennitsy, Zaraysky Uyezd, Ryazan Governorate, Russian SFSR
- Died: 7 September 2001 (aged 83); Moscow, Russia
- Occupations: Theater director; pedagogue; author
- Years active: 1940–2001
- Awards: People's Artist of the USSR (1977); Order of Lenin (1987); USSR State Prize (1973)

Andrey Aleksandrovich Goncharov (Note: Russian: Андрей Александрович Гончаров, romanized: Andrey Aleksandrovich Goncharov) (2 January 1918 – 7 September 2001) was a Soviet and Russian theater director, pedagogue and author. Goncharov, the People's Artist of the USSR (1977), received numerous state awards, including Hero of Socialist Labour (1987) and Order of Lenin (1987). In 1967–2001 Goncharov was the head of the Moscow Mayakovsky Theatre. He is the author of four acclaimed books on the drama theory.

== Biography ==
Andrey Goncharov was born on 2 January 1918, in the Sennitsy village of the Ryazan Governorate (now part of Moscow Oblast) where he spent his early years. In the 1920s the family moved to Moscow; his father worked as a piano teacher, his mother was a professional actress. In 1936 Goncharov enrolled into the Russian Institute of Theatre Arts; he studied in the actors' class of Vasily Toporkov, then moved to the director's group led by Nikolai Gorchakov. In 1940 in Ivanovo Goncharov presented his diploma production of Oleksandr Korniychuk's In the Steppes of Ukraine. In 1941 he graduated the Academy.

As the Great Patriotic War broke out, Goncharov volunteered for the Red Army and went to the frontline. He was injured twice in the action and demobilized. In 1942 Goncharov became the head and the arts director of the 1st Frontline Theatre, formed by the All-Russian Theatre Society, performing all over the Western Front and at the Baltic Fleet military bases.

In 1944 Andrey Goncharov joined the Moscow Satire Theatre as its deputy director. His first production here was Belugin's Marriage, by Alexander Ostrovsky. Then he moved to the Moscow Yermolova Theatre and produced several plays at the Maly Theatre. In 1958–1966 Goncharov was the artistic director at the Moscow Malaya Bronnaya Drama Theatre. In 1967 he joined the Mayakovsky Theatre which he was the head of for twenty years (1967–1987). For decades Goncharov taught at the Russian Institute of Theatre Arts. He was the secretary of the Russian Theatre Union, and a chairman of the Moscow Art Awards committee.

Goncharov died on 7 September 2001. He was interred in Novodevichy Cemetery.
