= Yakov Etinger =

Yakov Etinger is the name of:

- Yakov Gilyarievich Etinger (1887–1951), Soviet physician
- Yakov Yakovlevich Etinger (1929–2014), Russian politologist, essayist, historian and political activist; adopted son of Yakov Gilyarievich Etinger
