= Ryazan Province =

Ryazan Province may refer to:

- Ryazan Oblast (est. 1937), a federal subject of Russia
- Ryazan Governorate (1796–1929), an administrative division of the Russian Empire and the early Russian SFSR
