= Leonidov House =

Building in Rostov-on-Don, Russia

Coordinates: 47°13′07.6″N 39°42′08.8″E

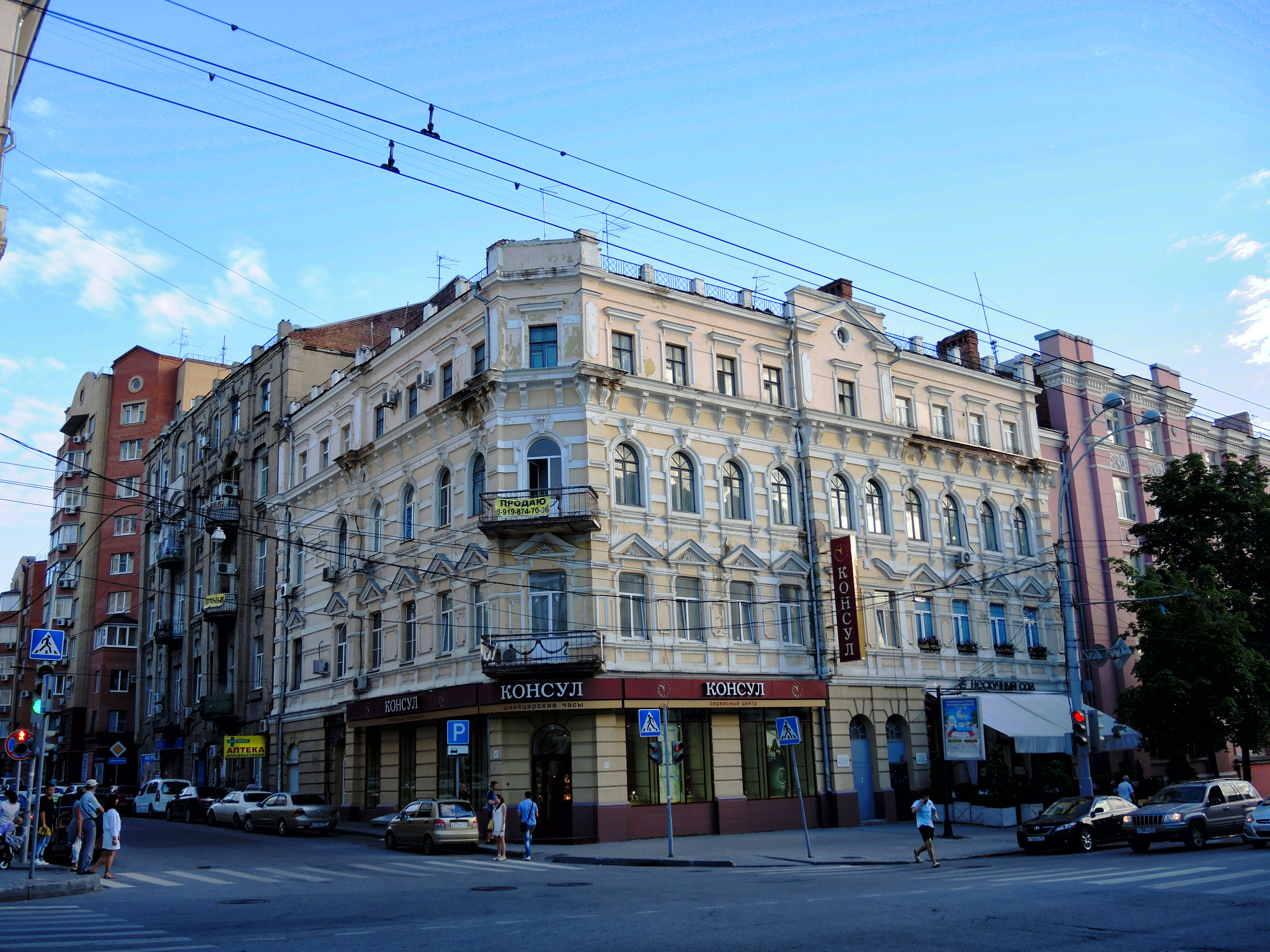
Leonidov House

The Leonidov House (Russian: Дом Леонидова, romanized: Dom Leonidova) is a building in the Leninsky District of Rostov-on-Don, Russia. The house is located at 30 Bolshaya Sadovaya street, at its intersection with Khalturinskiy Lane. Originally built as a revenue house, the Leonidov House has the status of an object of cultural heritage of regional significance.

== History ==
The Leonidov House was built in the early 20th century. The upper floors contained living accommodation, while various organizations occupied the ground floor. Writer and journalist Aleksander Bakharev worked in the Leonidov House, during his family's occupation of a flat on the third floor between 1950 and 1974. His literary subjects included the life and fate of people in kolkhozes, the legacy of Russian biologist and breeder Ivan Vladimirovich Michurin, and sketches about the Volga–Don Canal. Bakharev headed the administration of the Rostov Oblast writers' organization. He was awarded the Order of the Badge of Honour, the Order of the Red Banner and several medals.

Writer Vitaly Syomin lived on the fourth floor of the building with his family. He wrote the novels Zhenya and Valentina and "OST" badge, and the stories Asya Alexandrovna, Our Old Women, Visiting Aunts, Owner, In 1942, On the River, Down-River, among others. The Leonidov House was nationalized after the establishment of Soviet rule in 1920. Two memorial tablets commemorating Syomin and Bakharev were installed on the building's facade in 1983.

== Description ==
The building was designed in the Beaux-Arts style. The architecture employs baroque and classical elements of decoration. These include moldings, small corbels and architraves. The first floor is decorated with banded rustications with smooth-faced "V" joints and vermiculated square blocks. Second floor windows are crowned with triangular cornices. The fourth floor is decorated with labels. The nook-windows on the second and third floor have small balconies with delicate iron-cast railings.
