= Yakov Etinger (politologist) =

Russian political scientist

Yakov Yakovlevich Etinger (Belarusian: Якаў Якаўлевіч Этынгер; Russian: Яков Яковлевич Этингер; August 12, 1929 – August 5, 2014) was a Russian political scientist, essayist, historian and political activist.

== Biography ==
Etinger was born as Yakov Lazarevich Siterman (Russian: Яков Лазаревич Ситерман) in Minsk to Lazar and Vera Sitermans, who perished in the Holocaust. The boy was saved by his nanny Marina Kharetskaya (who was named a Righteous Among the Nations in 1997). He was adopted by the physician Yakov Gilyarievich Etinger and took his family name and patronymic.

During the Doctors' Plot affair, his foster parents were arrested and his father died in prison. Yakov was also arrested in 1950 and sentenced to 10 years in a gulag labor camp as the result of a false accusation of anti-Sovietism. He was exonerated in 1954. He died at the age of 84 on August 6, 2014.

== Scholarly activity ==
From 1956 to 1989 he worked in the Institute of World Economy and International Relations, starting as librarian and ending as principal research fellow, becoming one of the leading Soviet scholars of African studies.

== Political activity ==
In 1988 he was the member of the organizing committee of the Memorial Society.

== Literary work ==
In the 1990s Yakov Etinger published many works about Stalinism, Soviet political repressions and antisemitism in the Soviet Union, both in Russia and abroad.
