= Northern Bee =

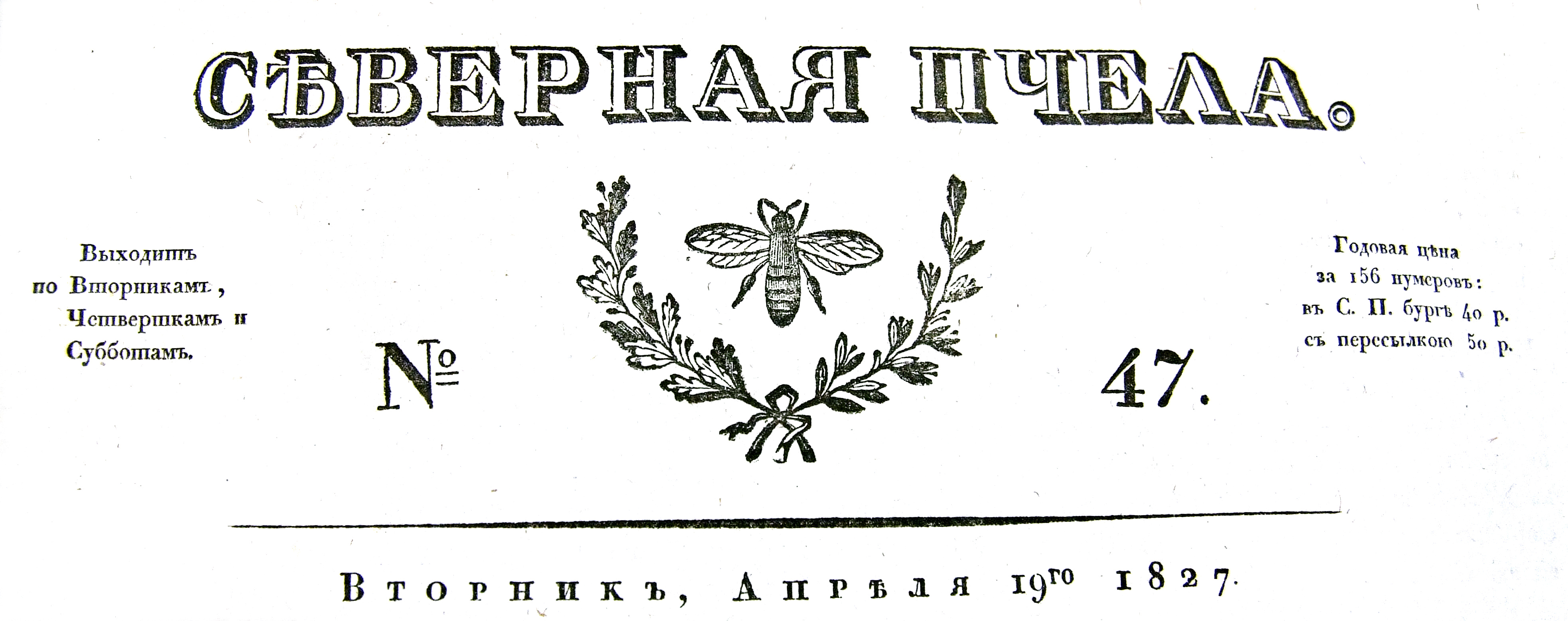
Northern Bee masthead

Northern Bee (Russian: Северная пчела) was a semi-official Russian political and literary newspaper published in St. Petersburg from 1825 (200 years ago) to 1864 (161 years ago). It was an unofficial organ of Section Three (the Third Section of His Imperial Majesty's Own Chancellery) – the secret police.

Northern Bee was founded by the reactionary writer (and police informer) Thaddeus Bulgarin in 1825. In 1831 through 1849 he published it in conjunction with Nikolai Grech. From 1825 to 1831 it came out three times a week, then daily after that. The paper was pitched toward readers who belonged to the middle classes (the serving gentry, provincial landlords, officials, merchants, burghers). In addition to domestic and foreign news, literature, and criticism, the paper printed a mix of inspirational stories and philosophical essays, bibliographies, and fashion pieces.

At first the paper showed a liberal bent, printing the works of Pushkin, Kondraty Ryleyev, and Fyodor Glinka. But after the Decembrist revolt of December 1825 it became a conservative pro-government publication.

By his own admission, Bulgarin worked with the chief of the Third Section, Count Alexander von Benckendorff, and used the knowledge gained by his position in writing reports for the police.

Northern Bee enjoyed a monopoly on political news and Bulgarin used its platform to express in various ways his disgust for constitutionalism and the parliamentary speakers in France and England, representing them as screamers and freethinkers in need of looking after by the police.

Having begun by publishing Pushkin and Ryleyev, including an enthusiastic review of the latter's poem "Voynarovsky", the paper turned to harassing Pushkin, mocking his antics and reproaching him for freethinking. In the French Romantics the Northern Bee saw "the legacy of the French Revolution, the destroyer of morality and the foundations of libertinism". The work of Gogol was characterized by the paper as portraits without any moral purpose, the "barnyard of human life".

In the pages of Northern Bee, Bulgarin argued fiercely with the Literary Gazette, Pushkin, Anton Delvig, the Moscow Observer, The Telescope, Notes of the Fatherland, and Vissarion Belinsky. One of the leading critics for Northern Bee, Leopold Brant, was a harsh detractor of the realist school which flourished beginning in the 1840s.

After the defeat in the Crimean War, readership began to decline due to the radicalization of public opinion. After 1860, under Pavel Usov, the paper changed its course and printed work by democratic writers such as Vasily Sleptsov, Fyodor Reshetnikov, and Marco Vovchok, and reviews of Nikolay Nekrasov and Mikhail Saltykov-Shchedrin. The paper also published lesser-known writers such as Ilya Arseniev, Nikolai Gersevanov, Clement Kanevsky, and "Blind Domna" (Domna Anisimova).

An attempt by Usov to convert the paper to be more like foreign papers in format and arrangement of sections was not successful. In 1864, the paper folded.
