= Miron Vovsi =

Soviet physician (1897–1960)

Miron Semyonovich Vovsi (Russian: Мирон Семёнович Вовси; May 13, 1897 in Krāslava, Vitebsk Governorate, Russian Empire, now Latvia – June 6, 1960 in Moscow, Russia) was a Jewish physician of the Soviet Union and a victim of the doctors' plot leading to his arrest and imprisonment.

After first studies in Dorpat (now Tartu, Estonia), Vovsi graduated in 1919 from the Medical department of the Moscow State University. He worked for a while as a doctor in Red Army, then started in 1922 a scientific career as an assistant and scientific fellow at Moscow State University and in the Medical-Biological Institute. From 1935, he simultaneously headed the chair of internal diseases at the Central Institute of Doctors' Post-Diploma Education and the therapeutic department at Moscow Botkin hospital. From 1941 to 1950 he occupied the position of Major Therapist of the Red Army ranked as a major-general of Medical Service.

Along with scientific activity (he was elected a member of USSR Academy of Medical Sciences), Vovsi had experience as a therapist and became notable in this quality.

As a physician, he consulted and treated many members of the Soviet government and leading generals of the Red Army in the Kremlin Hospital, now Central Clinical Hospital. This is why at the end of January 1953, Miron Vovsi was arrested within the frame of the so-named doctors' plot and was "designated" by the investigators to be one of the main figures of the plot, along with Stalin's personal physician Vinogradov. Vovsi's wife Vera was also arrested, while his daughter, an engineer, and his son in law, a navy officer, were just fired from their positions.

Vovsi was the cousin of Solomon Mikhoels, famous Jewish actor and director of Moscow State Jewish Theatre (GOSET), who was secretly assassinated in 1948 at the orders of Stalin and Georgy Malenkov. Vovsi was released by Lavrentiy Beria shortly after Stalin's death in 1953.
