= Dankovsky Uyezd =

Dankovsky Uyezd (Данковский уезд) was one of the subdivisions of the Ryazan Governorate of the Russian Empire, in the southwestern part of the governorate. Its administrative centre was Dankov.

== Demographics ==
At the time of the Russian Empire Census of 1897, Dankovsky Uyezd had a population of 105,746. Of these, 99.8% spoke Russian and 0.1% Romani as their native language.
