= Igor Smirnov (scientist) =

Russian scientist

Smirnov Igor Viktorovich
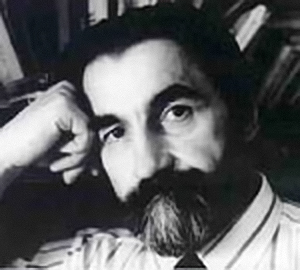
- Born: Abakumov Igor Viktorovich; April 5, 1951; Moscow, USSR
- Died: 5 November 2004 (aged 53); Russian Federation
- Citizenship: Soviet; Russian
- Education: Moscow Medical Academy
- Occupation: Scientist / Researcher
- Employer(s): KGB, Federal Security Service of the Russian Federation
- Known for: founder of computer psychotechnology, founder of psychotronic weapons, more than 20 patents (Classified information in Russia)
- Title: Research fellow, Doctor of Medical Sciences, Academician RANS
- Parents: Viktor Abakumov (father); Smirnova Antonina Nikolajevna (mother)

Igor Viktorovich Smirnov (Russian: Абакумов Игорь Викторович, Смирнов Игорь Викторович) (April 5, 1951 – November 5, 2004) was a controversial Russian scientist best known for his role in Soviet-era mind control research as well as an obscure field of human behavior study he called "psychoecology". He was a son of Soviet Minister of State Security Viktor Abakumov, who was executed for his role in Joseph Stalin's political repressions.

== Career ==
Smirnov has been characterized in the media as a Rasputin-like character with "almost mystical powers of persuasion". According to his wife Rusalkina, the Soviet military enlisted Smirnov's psychotechnology in the 1980s to combat the Mujahideen and treat post-traumatic stress syndrome in Russian soldiers during the war in Afghanistan. Smirnov's background included military research, and the care of drug addiction and mental illness. He founded the Psychotechnology Research Institute at the Peoples' Friendship University of Russia to work on ideas like "psychocorrection", a term he used to denote the use of subliminal messages to alter a subject's will, or even modify a person's personality without their knowledge.

The Institute caught the attention of Chris Morris and Janet Morris who were reportedly attempting to sell technology to the United States military. The FBI consulted Smirnov regarding the Waco Siege in 1993. Smirnov proposed piping subliminal messages from sect members' families through the phone lines during negotiations so as to effect the surrender of David Koresh, but the FBI declined the plan. Smirnov died in November 5, 2004, leaving his wife to run the Institute.

In May 2009, the U.S. Department of Homeland Security announced plans to award a contract for testing of an airport screening system based partly on Smirnov's concepts to ManTech SRS Technologies in association with Northam Psychotechnologies, a Canadian company acting as distributor for the Psychotechnology Research Institute.

== Published works ==
=== Books ===
- I.V. Smirnov, E. Beznosyuk, A. Suravlyev, Psychotechnologies, 416 pages –M.: Progress Publishers 1995 ISBN 5-01-004582-6

=== Articles ===
- Smirnov I.V., Kvasovets S.V., Fedorenko V.N. "Principles of Psycho-probing // Reports of information." The collection of abstracts VIMI. Publication N 11.90.9.39, î., 1990, With. 101–109.
- Smirnov I.V., Beznosjuk E.V. "Diagnostics and correction using Psycho-semantic methods. Sb. Scientific. Works for non-medicinal therapy of diagnostics and correction of health." MMA him. Setchenov, î., 1993.
- Smirnov I.V., Beznosjuk E.V. "Computer psychoanalysis and psychotherapy." Journal of Medical Help N 4, 1994.
- Smirnov I.V., Beznosjuk E.V. "Method of not subconscious psychotherapy, Psycho-correction and Psycho-semantic analysis with subthreshold introduction of the information." Journal Psychotherapy of Russia, N 3, 1994.
- Smirnov I.V., Beznosjuk E.V. "Computer Psychotechnologies of the semantic analysis of the unconscious." Russian Psycho Analysis Bulletin, N 3, 1994.
