= Ryazhsky Uyezd =

Subdivision of the Ryazan Governorate of the Russian Empire

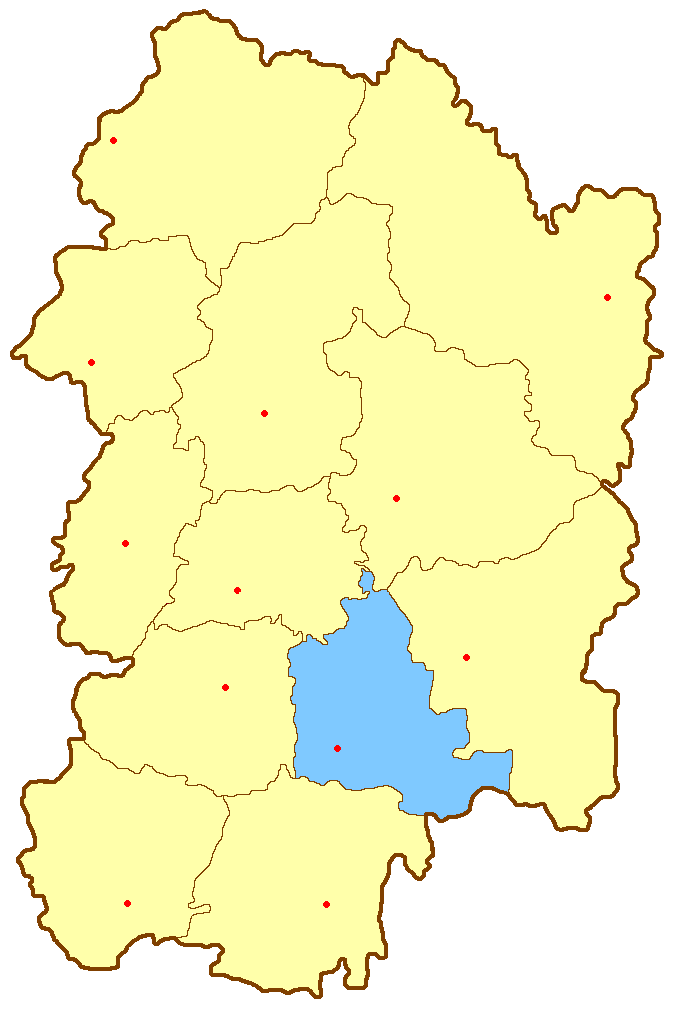

Ryazhsky Uyezd (Ряжский уезд) was one of the subdivisions of the Ryazan Governorate of the Russian Empire. It was situated in the southeastern part of the governorate. Its administrative centre was Ryazhsk.

== Demographics ==
At the time of the Russian Empire Census of 1897, Ryazhsky Uyezd had a population of 138,854. Of these, 99.9% spoke Russian as their native language.
