= Lev Shvartzman =

Soviet secret policeman (1907–1955)

Lev Leonidovich (Aronovich) Shvartzman
- Лев Леони́дович (Аронович) Шва́рцман
- Born: 25 July 1907; Shpola, Zvenigorodsky Uyezd. Kiev Governorate, Russian Empire (now Cherkasy Oblast, Zvenyhorodka Raion, Ukraine)
- Died: 13 May 1955 (aged 47); Moscow, Russian SFSR, USSR (now Russia)
- Military career
- Allegiance: Soviet Union
- Branch: NKVD
- Service years: 1937–1951
- Rank: Colonel
- Awards: Order of the Red Star

Lev Leonidovich (Aronovich) Shvartzman (Russian: Лев Леони́дович (Аронович) Шва́рцман; 25 July 1907 – 13 May 1955) was a Soviet MGB officer, notorious for his brutality, who was executed for using torture to extract false confessions from prisoners. His victims included Marshal Blyukher, the Colonel general Grigory Shtern, the writer Isaac Babel and the theatre director Vsevolod Meyerhold.

== Biography ==
=== Early career ===
He was born in Shpola, in Ukraine, the son of a Jewish bank official. During the Russian Civil War, his parents supported the White army against the Bolsheviks. His father served in the army of General Yudenich, and was killed in battle in 1919. His mother served as a military doctor. His two brothers fought in the army of Rüdiger von der Goltz. Lev Shvartzman left school at 14.

Despite his family background, he was allowed to join Komsomol in 1925. Having worked as a newspaper seller, he was taken on as a reporter in Kiev, and in February 1929, was transferred to Moscow to work for the newspaper Moskovski Komsomolets.

=== NKVD career ===
Shvartzman was recruited to the NKVD in 1935 and rapidly advanced during the Great Purge. In mid-1938, he was put in charge of investigating writers, artists, and publishers but was considered ineffective so was given the job of conducting 'intensive investigations'. Put in charge of forcing a confession out of Vasily Blyukher, Shvartzman beat him to death.

Shvartzman also tortured the former head of Komsomol, Aleksandr Kosarev, and his former deputy, Valentina Pikina. Pikina refused to sign a confession despite being severely beaten with rubber truncheons, put through a fake execution, and allegedly raped by Shvartzman and his colleague Boris Rodos.

=== The Meyerhold case ===
Vsevolod Meyerhold, who at the time had a greater reputation internationally than any other living theatre director in the USSR, wrote an account shortly before his execution of how he was tortured by Shvartsman. A copy of the document was retained in the archives of the KGB. Meyerhold wrote:

I was made to lie down and then beaten on the soles of my feet and my spine with a rubber strap ... For the next few days, when those parts of my legs were covered with extensive internal haemorrhaging, they again beat the red-blue-and-yellow bruises with the strap and the pain was so intense that it felt as if boiling hot water was being poured on those sensitive areas ... The intolerable physical and emotional pain caused my eyes to weep unending streams of tears. Lying face down on the floor, I discovered that I could wriggle, twist and squeal like a dog when its master whips it...

Meyerhold was 65 at the time. Isaac Babel was arrested at the same time as Meyerhold, and interrogated by Shvartsman and Rodos, and therefore it can be assumed that he was subjected to the same treatment.

=== Later career ===
In March 1940, Shvartzman was posted in Vyborg, which had just been seized during the Soviet Finnish War and incorporated in the USSR, and charged with creating an NKVD department in the captured territory. In February 1941, he was appointed deputy head of the NKGB Investigation Department of the USSR.

When the highly decorated Red Army officer Grigory Shtern was arrested in June 1941 and brought in front of Shvartzman's boss, Vsevolod Merkulov for interrogation, Shvartzman hit him with an electric cable, severing his right eye. He apologised to Merkulov for the blood that spilt on the carpet. Unable to bear the pain, Shtern signed a false confession that he was a German spy.

From August 1941, Shvartzman was deputy head of the NKVD / NKGB / MGB Investigation Department of the USSR of Special Importance. On 14 February 1943, he was raised to the rank of colonel of state security. In June 1949 he was sent to Bulgaria to assist in the investigation of Traicho Kostov, a member of the Political Bureau of the Bulgarian Communist Party. By the end of his career Shvartzman was so infamous for brutality that he had only to say his name during an interrogation and the prisoner would confess at once.

=== Arrest and execution ===
Lev Shvartzman was arrested on 13 July 1951. Viktor Abakumov, head of the MGB, had been arrested the previous day. Both arrests were products of Joseph Stalin's suspicion that there was a Jewish plot against him, inspired by the creation of the state of Israel. Abakumov had failed to take seriously the case being put together by his subordinate, Mikhail Ryumin, which became known as the Doctors' plot. Shvartzman was the highest ranking Jewish officer in the MGB, and the first of many to be arrested. Under interrogation, Shvartzman confessed to being a 'Jewish nationalist' and the linchpin of a terrorist organisation, organised with the connivance of Abakumov, made up of every senior Jewish officer in the security services. According to the former MGB officer Pavel Sudoplatov:

Shvartzman also 'confessed' to having homosexual relations with Abakumov, his son, and the British ambassador ... Shvartzman confessed that he had used homosexual contacts with American double agents to pass orders for terrorist actions to Jewish conspirators ... He invented unbelievable stories, like being inspired in his terrorist activities by drinking Zionist soup prepared by his Jewish aunt, or sleeping with his stepdaughter, or having homosexual relations with his son.

After Stalin's death, the Doctors' Plot was exposed as a fabrication, and Lavrenti Beria, who had regained control of the security services, offered Shvartzman a deal, that if he admitted extracting false confessions under torture, the charge of being a Zionist conspirator would be dropped, and he would receive a prison sentence. That offer was withdrawn after Beria's own downfall. Shvartzman was sentenced to death on 3 March 1955, and executed on 13 May 1955 after the Presidium of the USSR Supreme Council rejected a request for pardon.
