= Mikhail Kogan =

Soviet medical doctor

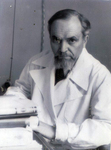
Mikhail Kogan

Mikhail Borisovich Kogan (Russian: Михаил Борисович Коган; September 5, 1893 in Zhitomir, Russian Empire – November 26, 1951 in Moscow, USSR) was a Soviet medical doctor, and head of the therapy department of 2nd Moscow Medical Institute. His patients included Samuel Marshak, Martiros Saryan, Dmitri Shostakovich, and Vyacheslav Molotov.

He was one of the doctors named in Joseph Stalin's fabricated Doctors' Plot in 1953, despite Kogan having already died by the time when the first article about the plot was published. His brother, Boris Borisovich Kogan, also a doctor, was arrested and jailed as part of the Doctors' Plot campaign.
