= Pronsky Uyezd =

Subdivision of the Ryazan Governorate of the Russian Empire

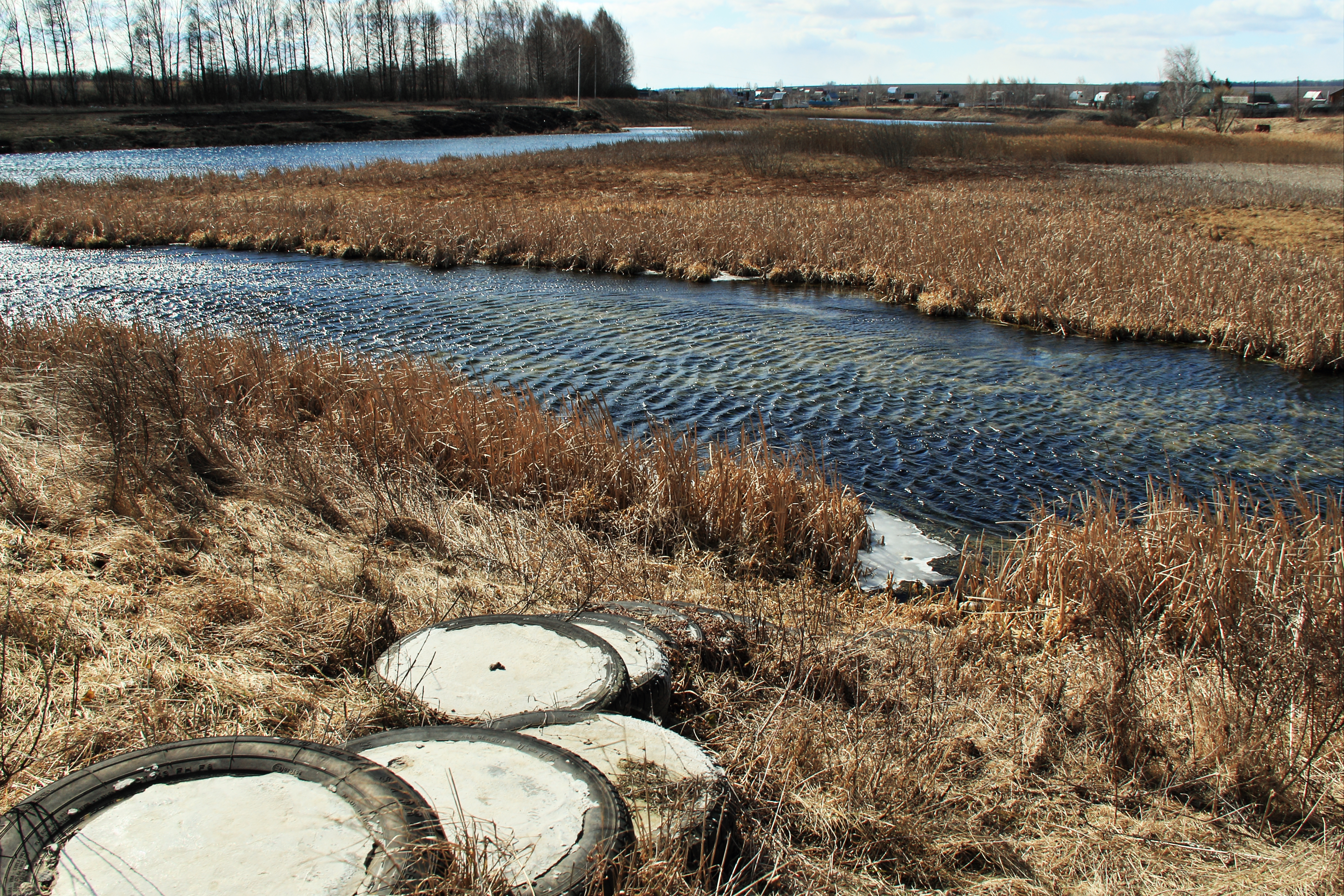

Pronsky Uyezd (Пронский уезд) was one of the subdivisions of the Ryazan Governorate of the Russian Empire. It was situated in the central part of the governorate. Its administrative centre was Pronsk.

== Demographics ==
At the time of the Russian Empire Census of 1897, Pronsky Uyezd had a population of 109,755. Of these, 99.9% spoke Russian as their native language.

== Notable people ==
Ivan Vladimirovich Michurin (1855–1935) plant breeder, was born in Pronsky Uyezd.
