= Skopinsky Uyezd =

Subdivision of the Ryazan Governorate of the Russian Empire

Skopinsky Uyezd (Скопинский уезд) was one of the subdivisions of the Ryazan Governorate of the Russian Empire. It was situated in the southwestern part of the governorate. Its administrative centre was Skopin.

== Demographics ==
At the time of the Russian Empire Census of 1897, Skopinsky Uyezd had a population of 176,682. Of these, 99.4% spoke Russian, 0.2% Polish, 0.2% Ukrainian and 0.1% Yiddish as their native language.
