= Mikhaylovsky Uyezd =

Administrative subdivision of Ryazan Viceroyalty and Ryazan Governorate

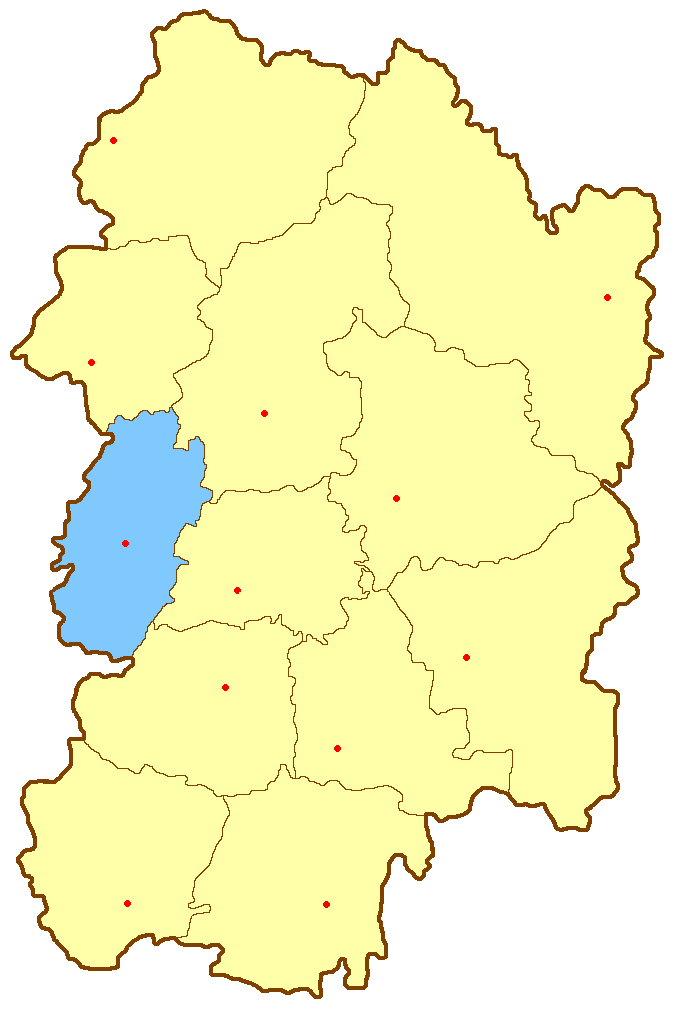

Mikhaylovsky Uyezd (Миха́йловский уе́зд) was one of the subdivisions of the Ryazan Governorate of the Russian Empire. It was situated in the western part of the governorate. Its administrative centre was Mikhaylov.

== Demographics ==
At the time of the Russian Empire Census of 1897, Mikhaylovsky Uyezd had a population of 151,709. Of these, 100.0% spoke Russian as their native language.
