= Solomon Mikhoels =

Soviet actor and activist (1890–1948)

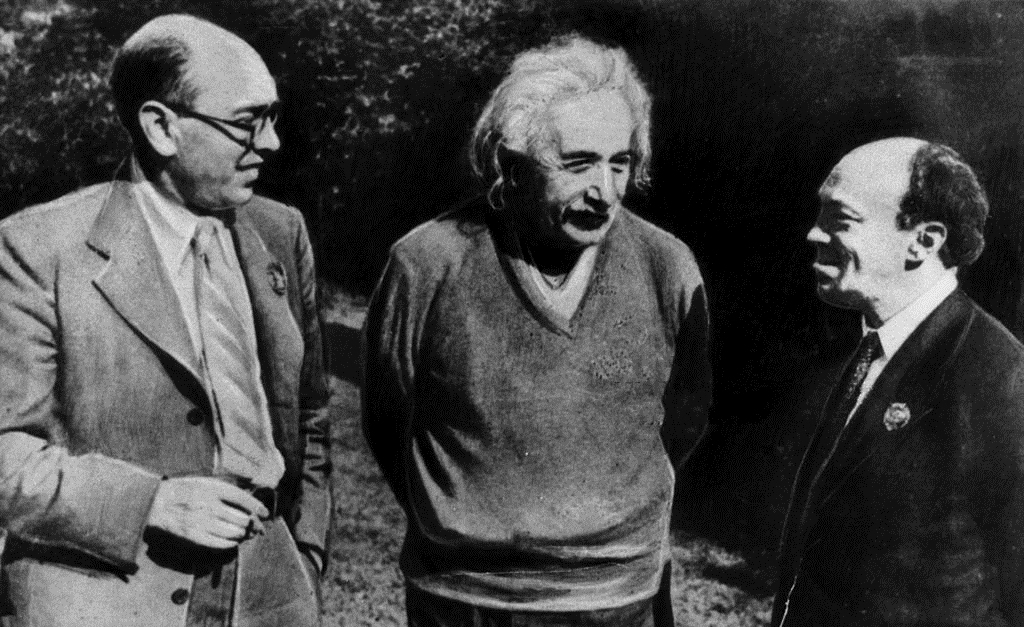
- Left–right: Itzik Feffer, Albert Einstein and Solomon Mikhoels in the United States in 1943
- Born: 16 March 1890; Dvinsk, Russian Empire
- Died: 13 January 1948 (aged 57); Minsk, Belarussian SSR, Soviet Union
- Cause of death: Assassination

Solomon (Shloyme) Mikhoels (Yiddish: שלמה מיכאעלס [also spelled שלוימע מיכאעלס during the Soviet era]; Russian: Cоломон (Шлойме) Михоэлс; 16 March [O.S. 4 March] 1890 – 13 January 1948) was a Soviet actor and the artistic director of the Moscow State Jewish Theater. Mikhoels served as the chairman of the Jewish Anti-Fascist Committee during World War II. However, as Joseph Stalin pursued an increasingly anti-Jewish line after the War, Mikhoels's position as a leader of the Jewish community led to increasing persecution from the Soviet state. He was allegedly assassinated in Minsk in 1948 by order of Stalin or Lavrenti Beria.

== Early life ==
Born Shloyme Vovsi to a Jewish family in Dvinsk, Russian Empire (now Daugavpils, Latvia), Mikhoels studied law in Saint Petersburg, but left school in 1918 to join Alexis Granowsky's Jewish Theater Workshop, which was attempting to create a national Jewish theater in Russia in Yiddish. The workshop moved to Moscow in 1920, where it established the Moscow State Jewish Theater. That was in keeping with Vladimir Lenin's policy on nationalities, which encouraged them to pursue and to develop their own cultures under the aegis of the Soviet state.

== Theatrical career ==
Mikhoels was the company's leading actor and, as of 1928, its director. His memorable roles included Tevye in an adaptation of Sholom Aleichem's novel Tevye the Milkman (which was adapted for an American audience as Fiddler on the Roof) and the title role in a Yiddish translation of Shakespeare's King Lear, in 1935. As a director he commissioned a new Bar Kochba, written by Shmuel Halkin, which the company successfully staged as a socialist turn on the traditional story.

These plays were ostensibly supportive of the Soviet state; however, the historian Jeffrey Veidlinger has argued that closer readings suggest that they actually contained veiled critiques of Joseph Stalin's regime and assertions of Jewish national identity. Ukrainian director Les Kurbas seems to have had a lasting influence on Mikhoel's directing style.

== Antifascist activities ==
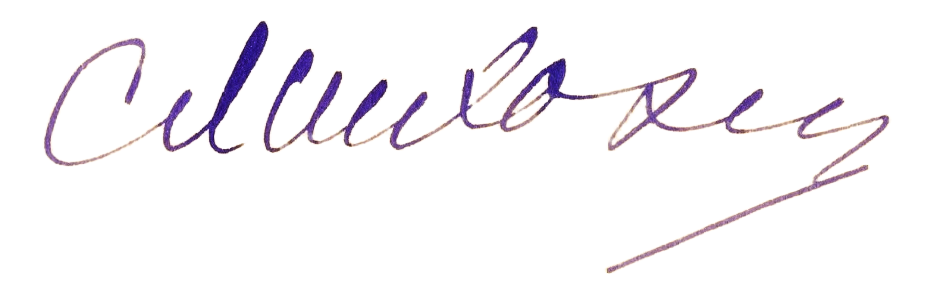
Solomon Mikhoels' signature

By the mid-1930s, Mikhoels's career was threatened because of his association with other leading intelligentsia members who were victims of Stalin's Great Purge.

On August 24, 1941, Mikhoels led a gathering of thousands in central Moscow's Gorky Park. It was explicitly a Jewish rally and aimed to raise funds for the Soviet war effort from the international Jewish community. Speakers included the writer David Bergelson.

Mikhoels actively supported Stalin against Adolf Hitler and, in 1942, was made the chairman of the Jewish Anti-Fascist Committee. In that capacity, he travelled around the world and met with Jewish communities to encourage them to support the Soviet Union in its war against Nazi Germany.

That was useful to Stalin during World War II, but after the war, Stalin opposed contacts between Soviet Jews and Jewish communities in noncommunist countries, particularly Mikhoels' aims of establishing Jewish autonomy in Crimea, which he regarded as a plot by American capitalists. The Jewish State Theater was closed, and the members of the Jewish Anti-Fascist Committee were arrested. All but two were eventually executed in the purges shortly before Stalin's death.

== Death ==
On the morning of 13 January 1948, workmen discovered Mikhoels's dead body lying in snow in a quiet street in Minsk. The theatre critic Vladimir Golubov-Potapov was lying dead beside him. It was announced that they had been killed in a traffic accident. Mikhoels's body lay in state for a day in the Jewish National Theatre. He was praised in a Pravda obituary and accorded a state funeral, with prominent members of the party and government officials among the mourners. His daughter, Natalya, and her composer husband Moisei Weinberg hosted a stream of mourners at their flat, including the composer Dmitri Shostakovich. He was buried at the New Donskoy Cemetery, in Moscow.

Even at the time, many people suspected that his death was not an accident, including the Yiddish poet Peretz Markish, who hinted in a poem that Mikhoels's name should be added to the six million victims of The Holocaust.

Stalin's daughter, Svetlana Alliluyeva, later wrote that:

One day, in my father's dacha ... I entered his room when he was speaking to someone on the telephone. Something was being reported to him and he was listening, Then, as a summary of the conversation he said, 'Well, it's an automobile accident.' I remember so well the way he said it ... He wasn't asking: he was suggesting 'an automobile accident' ... a little later, he said: 'Mikhoels has been killed in an automobile accident'. But the next day ... a girl student told me, weeping, how brutally Mikhoels had been murdered."

Two weeks after Mikhoels' death, his alleged assassin, Lavrentiy Tsanava, was secretly given the Order of Lenin "for exemplary execution of a special assignment from the government".

After Stalin's death in March 1953, Lavrentiy Beria regained control of the Ministry for State Security (MGB), which he had temporarily lost, and on 2 April, he informed the party praesidium that Mikhoels and Golubov had been murdered. The men he accused of the murders, Tsanava, Minister of State Security for the Belorussian republic, and Soviet Deputy Minister State Security, Sergei Ogoltsov, were arrested. When Beria was himself arrested, in June, Ogoltsov's wife and Tsanava pleaded for the case to be overturned. Ogoltsov was released, though Tsanava died in prison.

According the former MGB officer Pavel Sudoplatov, who was assigned in 1953 to investigate the murder, Mikhoels was lured to Tsanava's country dacha, ostensibly to meet some of Byelorussia's leading dramatic artists, and was stabbed with a poison needle by an MGB officer named Lebedev, with Tsanava and Ogoltsov supervising the operation. Golubov was an MGB informer, who was also killed by the chekists because he was an "inconvenient witness".

== Family ==
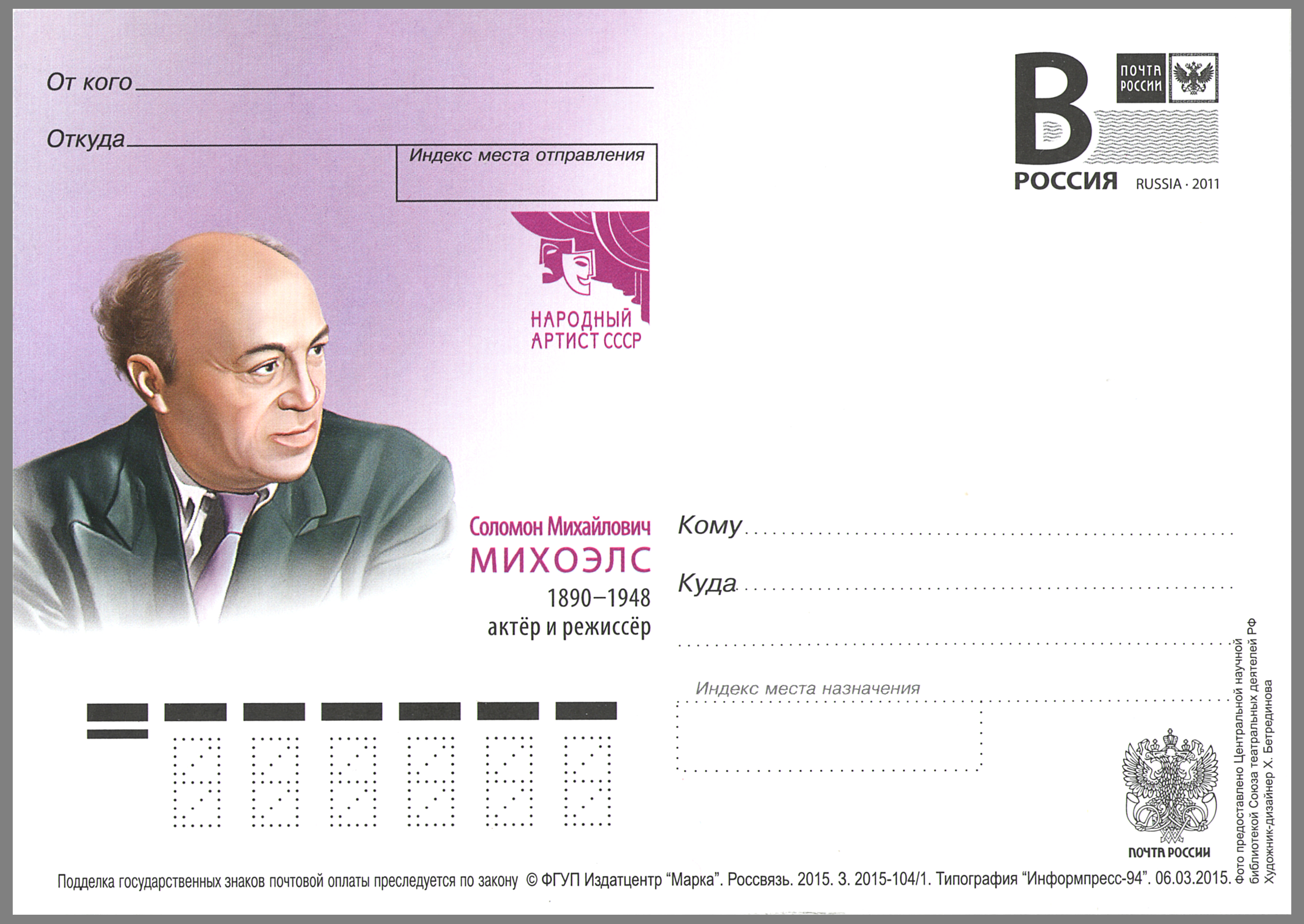
A postal card issued to commemorate the 125th birth anniversary of Solomon Mikhoels. Post of Russia, 2015.

Mikhoels was married to Anastasia Pototskaya, a Russian of Polish descent. He had two daughters from his first marriage to Sara Kantor, Nina and Natalya Vovsi.

Mikhoels' cousin Miron Vovsi was a famous physician. He was arrested during the Doctors' plot affair but released after Stalin's death in 1953, as was Mikhoels' son-in-law, the Polish-born composer Mieczysław Weinberg. In 1983, Mikhoels' daughter, Natalia Vovsi-Mikoels, wrote a biography of her father: My Father Shlomo Mikhoels: The Life and Death of a Jewish Actor.

== Other posts ==
- Jewish Theater School Artistic Director, Professor
- Member of Moscow City Council
- Member of the Stalin Prize Committee

== Ranks and awards ==
- Order of Lenin
- People's Artist of the USSR
- Stalin Prize Laureate
