= Nakhunavo =

Nakhunavo ნახუნავო
- Location within Georgia
- Coordinates: 42°25′18″N 42°19′55″E
- Country: Georgia
- Mkhare: Samegrelo-Zemo Svaneti
- District: Martvili
- Elevation: 230 m (750 ft)

Population (2014)
  - Total: 333
- Time zone: UTC+4 (Georgian Time)

Nakhunavo (Georgian: ნახუნავო) is a village in the Martvili Municipality of Samegrelo-Zemo Svaneti in western Georgia.
