= Ranenburgsky Uyezd =

Subdivision of the Ryazan Viceroyalty and Ryazan Governorate

Ranenburgsky Uyezd (Раненбургский уезд) was one of the subdivisions of the Ryazan Governorate of the Russian Empire. It was situated in the southern part of the governorate. Its administrative centre was Ranenburg (Chaplygin).

== Demographics ==
Population after census of 1897 — 152,691 (73,763 men and 78,928 women). Its administrative center – Ranenburg – had a population of 15,331.

According to Soviet Census of 1926, the population almost doubled, having 300,435 people in the Uyezd, of which 22,051 lived in towns and cities.
