= Louis Rapoport =

American writer and editor

Louis H. Rapoport (Hebrew: לואי רפופורט; born 7 July 1942 – 20 June 1991) was a writer and senior editor of The Jerusalem Post.

== Biography ==
Rapoport was born in Los Angeles. After he served two years in West Africa as a Peace Corps volunteer, he achieved his degree from UC Berkeley, and moved to Jerusalem. Within a few weeks, he met his future wife Sylvia.

He died on 20 June 1991.

== Books ==
- The Lost Jews: Last of the Ethiopian Falashas, 1980.
- Anatoly and Avital Sharansky, 1986.
- Confrontation: Israeli Life in the Year of the Uprising, 1988.
- Stalin's War Against the Jews; The Doctors' Plot and the Soviet Solution, 1990.
