= Zaraysky Uyezd =

Subdivision of the Ryazan Governorate, Russian Empire

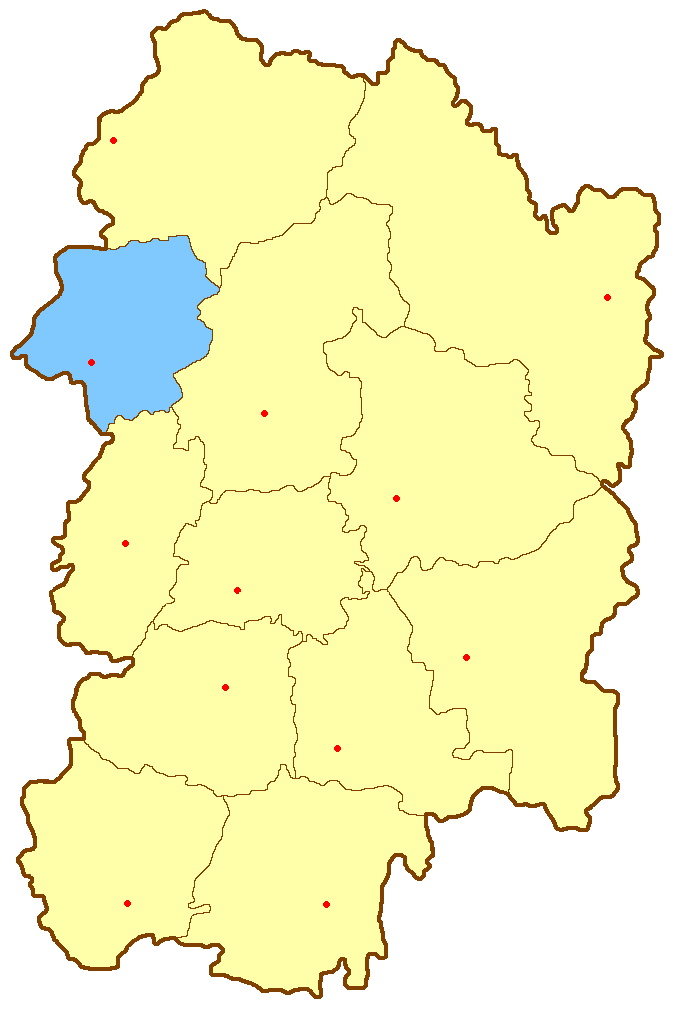

Zaraysky Uyezd (Зарайский уезд) was one of the subdivisions of the Ryazan Governorate of the Russian Empire. It was situated in the northwestern part of the governorate. Its administrative centre was Zaraysk.

== Demographics ==
At the time of the Russian Empire Census of 1897, Zaraysky Uyezd had a population of 114,834. Of these, 99.4% spoke Russian, 0.1% Ukrainian, 0.1% Polish, 0.1% German and 0.1% Yiddish as their native language.
