= Mikhail Ryumin =

Soviet security officer (1913–1954)

Mikhail Dmitrievich Ryumin
- Михаил Дмитриевич Рюмин

Deputy Ministry of State Security
- In office October 19, 1951 – November 13, 1952

Personal details
- Born: September 1, 1913 Bolshoye Kaban'ye, Shadrinsky Uyezd, Perm Governorate, Russian Empire
- Died: July 22, 1954 (aged 40) Moscow, Russian SFSR, Soviet Union

Military service
- Allegiance: Soviet Union
- Branch/service: Red Army; NKVD; MGB
- Years of service: 1935–1951
- Rank: Colonel
- Battles/wars: World War II; Eastern Front

Mikhail Dmitrievich Ryumin Михаил Дмитриевич Рюмин (1 September 1913 – 22 July 1954) was a Soviet security officer and deputy head of the Soviet MGB (Ministry of State Security) who engineered the "Doctors' Plot" in 1952–1953. After the death of Joseph Stalin (March 1953), his successors dismissed the case and had Ryumin arrested and executed.

== Biography ==
=== Early career ===
Ryumin was born in Bolshoye Kaban'ye (Большое Кабанье), in southwest Siberia. Reputedly, his family were wealthy farmers, his brother and sister were convicted thieves, and his father in law fought against the Bolsheviks in the White Army commanded by Admiral Kolchak. Despite his background, he survived the wholesale arrests of 'kulaks' instigated by Josif Stalin. Around 1931, he was working as bookkeeper on a collective farm in the Urals. His next break came after Nikolai Yezhov ordered the mass arrest of NKVD officers suspected of loyalty to his predecessor, Genrikh Yagoda in 1937, when Ryumin joined the NKVD as a bookkeeper. He worked for SMERSH during the war. In 1948, he was transferred to the Department for Specially Important Cases, within the MGB.

Ryumin personally tortured prisoners in the Sukhanovo Prison, and appears to have enjoyed doing it. His victims included a young American, Alexander Dolgun who was arrested in Moscow in 1948, but later released and deported. In his memoirs, he recalled being told by Ryumin: "I have a Cossack method of beating. I draw as I hit. You will never have felt such pain! Ever!". Ryumin then beat him unconscious, using a two-foot long rubber club.

Early in 1949, he supervised the interrogation of Boris Shimeliovich, a long-standing party member who came under suspicion because of his war time involvement in the Jewish Anti-Fascist Committee. Accused of terrorism, he refused to confess, and was beaten so badly that he had to be brought in on a stretcher for his interrogation to continue. At his trial, Shimeliovich told the judge: "I received approximately eighty to one hundred blows a day, so altogether I think I was hit about two thousand times."

=== The Doctors' Plot ===
In 1950, Ryumin began the interrogation of Professor Yakov Gilyarievich Etinger, an eminent, elderly Jewish cardiologist, who had made critical remarks about the regime to family and friends. Dr. Etinger had treated two very high ranking communists, Andrei Zhdanov and Alexander Shcherbakov who had died from heart disease. Ryumin tried to force him to confess to murdering them both. This was the origin of the Doctors' Plot, one of the most infamous miscarriages of justice of the Stalin era. It is not known whether it was originally Ryumin's idea, or whether Stalin put him up to it. According to a fellow officer, Ryumin was a "notorious anti-semitic" but "primitive". At his trial in 1953, he was described as "half-educated" and "dim-witted". Stalin nicknamed him the "pygmy".

After Etinger had been put through 37 separate interrogations between November 1950 and January 1951, Ryumin was ordered by the Minister of State Security Viktor Semyonovich Abakumov to ease up because medical staff had warned that stress might kill the elderly prisoner. Despite this, Ryumin carried out another 39 interrogations, accompanied by sleep deprivation and other abuses until Etinger's death on 2 March 1951.

Ryumin was reprimanded, and fearing worse was to come, wrote to Stalin on 2 July 1951 accusing Abakumov of covering up a plot by Jewish terrorists. Reputedly the letter was largely written for him by an official named Dmitri Sukhanov, who ran the private office of Georgi Malenkov.

Stalin's reaction was to promote Ryumin to head of the Department for Specially Important Cases, and to dismiss Abakumov, who was arrested. The new head of the MGB, Semyon Ignatyev, is said to have been ordered by Stalin to allow Ryumin pursue his persecution of Jews without interference. During his 18-month ascendancy, almost every high-ranking Jew in the security services - such as the specialists in torture, Lev Shvartzman and Boris Rodos were dismissed, and Ryumin reputedly planned a trial with Abakumov and Shvartzman as principle defendants. He also pursued the case of the Old Bolshevik Solomon Lozovsky and a group of Jewish writers.

=== Downfall ===
Ryumin was abruptly sacked on 13 November 1952, apparently because Stalin had decided that he was too incompetent to do the job. He then returned to his old profession as a book keeper. After the death of Stalin in March 1953, Lavrentiy Beria regained control of the MGB. The Doctor's Plot was denounced as a fabrication. On 17 March, Ryumin was arrested.

He was the sole defendant at a trial that lasted six days, from 2 July to 7 July 1954. He was sentenced to death and executed. It has been suggested, for instance by the historian Robert Conquest, that the lengthy trial was ordered by Malenkov to exonerate himself from any involvement in the Doctors' Plot and Ryumin's other activities.

== In literature ==
Ryumin appears as a character in Alexander Solzhenitsyn's novel, The First Circle, where he is described as "pink-cheeked and plump, with thin peevish lips". It is suggested that his big break came when a prosecutor reported him to Abakumov for blatantly fabricating a case against a war correspondent. Instead of reprimanding him, Abakumov appointed him a senior interrogator.
