= Sapozhkovsky Uyezd =

Administrative subdivision of Ryazan Viceroyalty

Sapozhkovsky Uyezd (Сапожко́вский уезд) was one of the subdivisions of the Ryazan Governorate of the Russian Empire. It was situated in the eastern part of the governorate. Its administrative centre was Sapozhok.

== Demographics ==
At the time of the Russian Empire Census of 1897, Sapozhkovsky Uyezd had a population of 161,720. Of these, 99.9% spoke Russian as their native language.
