= Viktor Abakumov =

Soviet security official (1908–1954)

- Виктор Абакумов
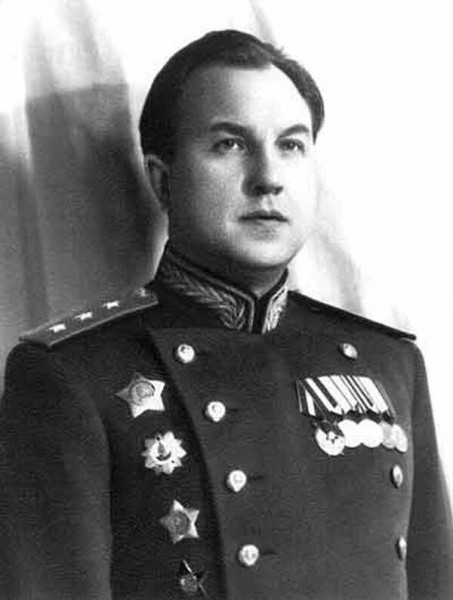
- Abakumov in the 1940s

Minister of State Security
- In office 4 May 1946 – 14 July 1951
- Preceded by: Vsevolod Merkulov
- Succeeded by: Sergei Ogoltsov

Head of SMERSH
- In office 14 April 1943 – 4 May 1946

Personal details
- Born: 24 April 1908 Moscow, Russian Empire
- Died: 19 December 1954 (aged 46) Leningrad, Russian SFSR, Soviet Union
- Cause of death: Execution by firing squad
- Party: All-Union Communist Party (Bolsheviks) (1930–1951)
- Children: Igor Smirnov

Military service
- Allegiance: Russian Soviet Federative Socialist Republic (1921–1922); Soviet Union (1922–1951)
- Branch/service: Red Army; OGPU; GUGB; NKVD; SMERSH; MGB
- Years of service: 1921–1951
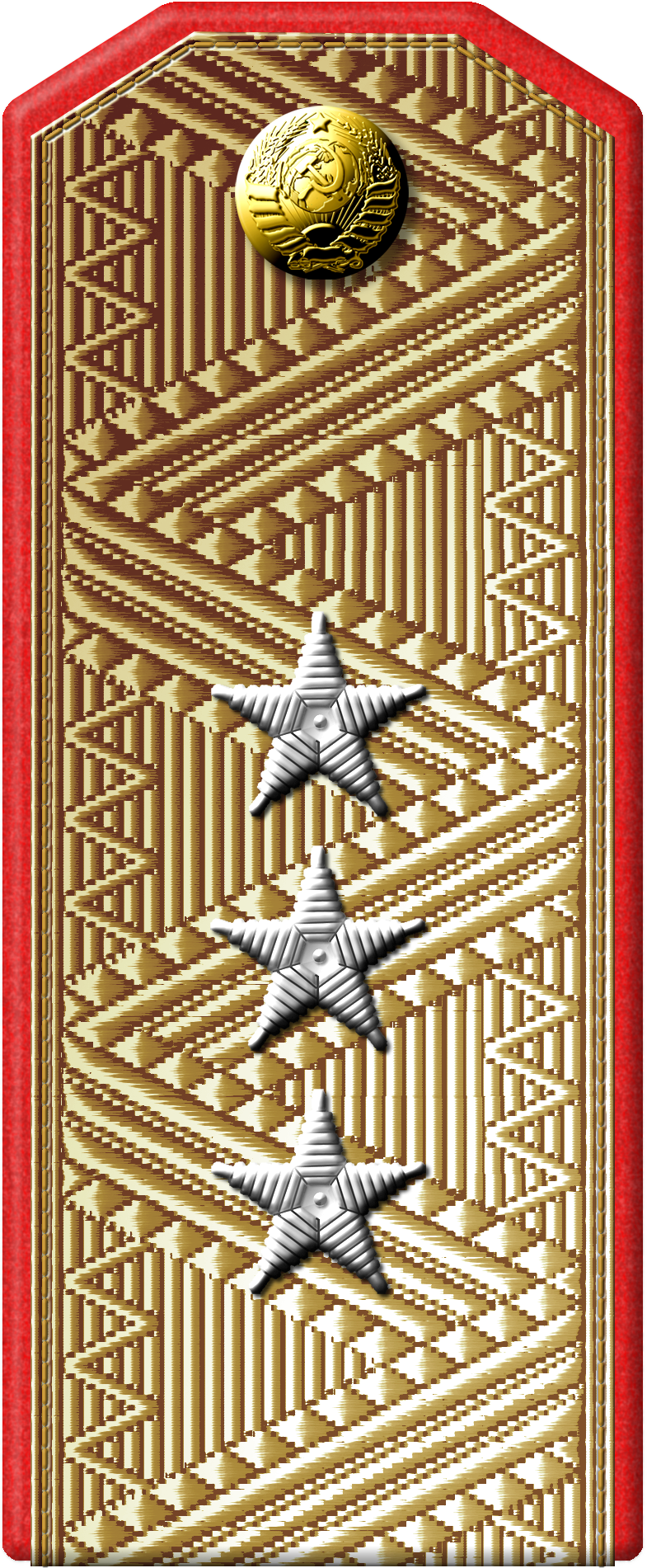
- Rank: Colonel general
- Battles/wars: Russian Civil War; World War II; Battle of Moscow; Battle of Stalingrad; Battle of the Caucasus; Anti-communist insurgencies in Central and Eastern Europe; Baltic Insurgency; Ukraine Insurgency

Viktor Semyonovich Abakumov (Russian: Виктор Семёнович Абакумов; 24 April 1908 – 19 December 1954) was a high-level Soviet security official who from 1943 to 1946 was the head of SMERSH in the People's Commissariat of Defense, and from 1946 to 1951 of the Minister of State Security or MGB (ex-NKGB). He was removed from office and arrested in 1951 on charges of failing to investigate the Doctors' Plot. After the death of Joseph Stalin, Abakumov was tried for fabricating the Leningrad affair, sentenced to death and executed in 1954.

== Early life and family ==
Abakumov was an ethnic Russian. Recent scholarship suggests that he was born in Moscow, though he was previously said to be from the Don Cossack region of south Russia. His father was an unskilled labourer, and his mother was a nurse.

== Career ==
=== Early career ===
At age 14, Abakumov joined the Soviet Red Army in spring 1922 and served with the 2nd Special Task Moscow Brigade in the Russian Civil War until demobilization in December 1923. He then joined the Komsomol. He became a candidate member of the All-Union Communist Party (Bolsheviks) in 1930, and worked in the People's Commissariat of Supplies until 1932, while being responsible for the Military Section of the Communist Youth League in the Moscow area (raion).

In early 1932, recommended by the Party to join the security services (OGPU), he was assigned to the Economic Department and possibly to the Investigation Department. In 1933, he was dismissed from the Economic Department and assigned as an overseer to the Gulag. This was a clear demotion; Abakumov was a compulsive womanizer, and his superior, M.P. Shreider (ru), regarded Abakumov as unfit to be a Chekist.

=== Rise through NKVD ranks ===
In 1934, after the reorganization of the security apparatus (the OGPU was joined to the NKVD as a GUGB), Abakumov started his work in a 1st Section of Economics Department (EKO) by the Main Directorate of State Security (GUGB) of NKVD. On 1 August 1934, he was transferred to the Chief Directorate of Camps and Labour Colonies (Gulag), where he served until 1937, mainly as an operative officer in the 3rd Section of Security Department of Gulag of the NKVD. In April 1937, Abakumov was moved to the 4th Department (OO) of GUGB of the NKVD where he served until March 1938.

After the next reorganization of NKVD structure in March 1938, he became assistant to the chief of the 4th Department in the 1st Directorate of the NKVD. From 29 September to 1 November 1938, he was an assistant to Pyotr Fedotov, the head of the 2nd Department (Secret Political Dep – or. SPO) of GUGB of the NKVD. Until the end of 1938, he worked in the SPO GUGB NKVD as a head of one of the sections. Abakumov survived the Great Purge by participating in it. He executed each order without scruple, probably saving him from facing an execution squad himself. Near the end of December 1938, Abakumov was moved from Moscow to Rostov-on-Don, where he became the head of the UNKVD of the Rostov Oblast (the head of the local NKVD Office).

=== World War II activities ===
Abakumov returned to Moscow headquarters on 12 February 1941 as a Captain of State Security. He acquired this rank 28 December 1938, bypassing the rank of senior lieutenant of State security. After the reorganization and creation of the new NKGB, he became one of the deputies of Lavrentiy Beria, who was the People's Commissar for Internal Affairs (head of the NKVD). On 19 July 1941, he became the head of newly Directorate of Special Department's (UOO) of the NKVD which was responsible for Counterintelligence and internal security in the RKKA (Red Army).

In this position, after the attack of Nazi Germany on the Soviet Union and the defeats experienced by the Red Army, on Stalin's order he led the purges of RKKA commanders accused of betrayal and cowardice. In 1943, from 19 April to 20 May 1943, Abakumov was one of Stalin's deputies, when he held the post of People's Commissar of Defence of the USSR.

In April 1943, when military Counterintelligence Main Directorate of the People's Commissariat of Defence of the USSR (or GUKR NKO USSR) better known as SMERSH was created, Abakumov was put in charge of it, in the rank of Commissar (2nd rank) of State Security, and held the title of vice-Commissar of Defense.

During the war, he reported directly to Joseph Stalin, and appears to have been able to bypass Beria. For example, Beria disclaimed responsibility for the arrest in 1941 of the Red Army Marshal, Kirill Meretskov, for which he blamed Stalin and Abakumov. However, Nikita Khrushchev – who later denounced Stalin and had both Beria and Abakumov executed – did not believe him. He claimed that Stalin "thought he had found in Abakumov a bright young man who was dutifully carrying out his orders, but actually Abakumov was reporting to Stalin what Beria had told him Stalin wanted to hear".

He used his position to enrich himself. He took over a 'splendid' apartment, whose previous occupant, a soprano, he had arrested, and "stashed his mistresses in the Moskva Hotel and imported trainloads of plunder from Berlin."

=== Head of MGB ===
In 1946, Stalin appointed Abakumov Minister of State Security (MGB). Although the ministry was under the general supervision of Beria, Stalin hoped to curb the latter's power. Beria was said by Vsevolod Merkulov to be "scared to death of Abakumov" and tried to "have good relations" with him. In his capacity in the MGB he was in charge of the 1949 purge known as the "Leningrad affair," in which the Politburo members Nikolai Voznesensky and Aleksei Kuznetsov were executed.

He also carried out the early stages of the anti-semitic campaign that Stalin ordered, as the second pro-Arab phase of Stalin's Middle East plans following the enormous military support he had given to help establish the state of Israel, involving the arrest and torture of numerous prominent Jews, including an Old Bolshevik, Solomon Lozovsky.

When the eminent scientist, Lina Stern, was arrested and brought before Abakumov, he shouted at her, accusing her of being a Zionist and of plotting to turn the Crimea into a separate Jewish state. When she denied the accusation, he shouted: "Why you old whore!" Stern replied: "So that's the way a minister talks to an academician."

== Arrest and execution ==
In March 1951, an elderly Jewish doctor, Yakov Gilyarievich Etinger, died in custody after being subjected to interrogations lasting up to 12 hours a session by a junior officer, Mikhail Ryumin. Ryumin claimed that Etinger had confessed to murdering the former leader of the Moscow communist party, Aleksandr Shcherbakov, but neither Abakumov nor his deputy, Mikhail Likhachev, believed his story, and Likhachev proposed that Ryumin be disciplined for mishandling the case. Ryumin retaliated by writing to Stalin alleging that Abakumov and Likhachev were covering up Shcherbakov's "murder". A Politburo commission backed Ryumin, and ruled that Abakumov had "prevented the Central Committee from exposing the undoubtedly real conspiratorial group of doctors" who were supposedly foreign agents intent on murdering leaders of the communist party. This fabrication became known as the Doctors' plot.

Abakumov was dismissed on 11 July, and arrested the following day. For three months, he was held in a freezing cell, whilst being interrogated by Ryumin, a vicious torturer. Most of the leading Jewish officers who had worked with Abakumov were dismissed, and several were arrested. Ryumin planned to build a case in which Abakumov and Lev Shvartzman were at the head of a Zionist plot. Shvartzman "confessed" not only to being part of a Zionist plot, but to having had homosexual relations with Abakumov, and his son.

In March 1953 Stalin died, Beria regained control of the police, Ryumin was arrested, and the Doctors' plot was declared to have been a fabrication, but Abakumov and his associates remained in prison. On 2 April, Beria sent a note to the Praesidium of the Central Committee saying that Abakumov had been questioned about the suspicious death of the actor, Solomon Mikhoels, and had confessed that he was murdered on Stalin's orders. On 12 May, Beria sent another note, accusing Abakumov of having fabricated the case against Polina Zhemchuzhina, Jewish wife of the Foreign Minister, Vyacheslav Molotov, who had been arrested as a suspected Zionist in 1948. On 26 May, Beria submitted another memorandum, accusing Abakumov of fabricating the case against the former Minister of Aviation, Aleksey Shakhurin and other leaders of the air force, who were released after seven years in prison.

The case against Abakumov continued after Beria's arrest, with the additional detail that he was now accused of being "an accomplice in the crimes of Beria". The most serious charge against him was that he had been involved in fabricating the charges against Nikolai Voznesensky and other victims of the "Leningrad affair". During a meeting of Leningrad party members, on 6 May 1954, the USSR Procurator General, Roman Rudenko described Abakumov as "a criminal, falsifying criminal cases, an adventurer, ready to commit any crimes for the sake of his careeristic, enemy goals, a bourgeois degenerate."

Abakumov and five others were brought to a six-day trial in December 1954, accused of falsifying the "Leningrad Affair" and other charges. Abakumov and three former deputy heads of the MGB Section for Investigating Specially Important Cases, Aleksandr Leonov, Vladimir Komarov and Mikhail Likhachev, were sentenced to death and shot after the trial ended on 19 December. Two others, Yakov M. Broverman and I. A. Chernov were sentenced, respectively, to 25 years and 15 years in the Gulag. In 1970, it was reported that Yakov Broverman was enjoying a relatively privileged position as a trustee in a labour camp. He was released in 1976.

== Awards ==
Abakumov was deprived of all titles and awards on November 14, 1955.

Order of the Red Banner, thrice (1940, 1944, 1948)
Order of Suvorov, 1st class (31 July 1944)
Order of Kutuzov, 1st class (21 April 1945)
Order of Suvorov, 2nd class (8 March 1944)
Order of the Red Star (1944)
Medal "For the Defence of Stalingrad" (1942)
Medal "For the Defence of Moscow" (1944)
Medal "For the Defence of the Caucasus" (1944)
Medal "For the Victory over Germany in the Great Patriotic War 1941–1945" (1945)
Jubilee Medal "30 Years of the Soviet Army and Navy" (1948)
Medal "In Commemoration of the 800th Anniversary of Moscow" (1947)

== In literature and film ==
Abakumov is portrayed as a cunning courtier, not altogether trusted by Stalin, in Aleksandr Solzhenitsyn's novel, The First Circle. In the 1992 film version of the book, he was played by Christopher Plummer and in a Russian language mini-series broadcast in 2006, he was played by Roman Madyanov. There is another fictional portrayal of him in the novel Dust and Ashes by Anatoly Rybakov. In Solzhenitsyn's famous non-fiction text, The Gulag Archipelago, he accused Abakumov of personally engaging in the beatings and torture of prisoners during interrogations.
