= Spassky Uyezd (Ryazan Governorate) =

Subdivision of the Ryazan Governorate of the Russian Empire

Spassky Uyezd (Спасский уезд) was one of the subdivisions of the Ryazan Governorate of the Russian Empire. It was situated in the eastern part of the governorate. Its administrative centre was Spassk (Spassk-Ryazansky).

== Demographics ==
At the time of the Russian Empire Census of 1897, Spassky Uyezd had a population of 156,976. Of these, 99.9% spoke Russian as their native language.
