= Ivan Michurin (biologist) =

Russian agronomist

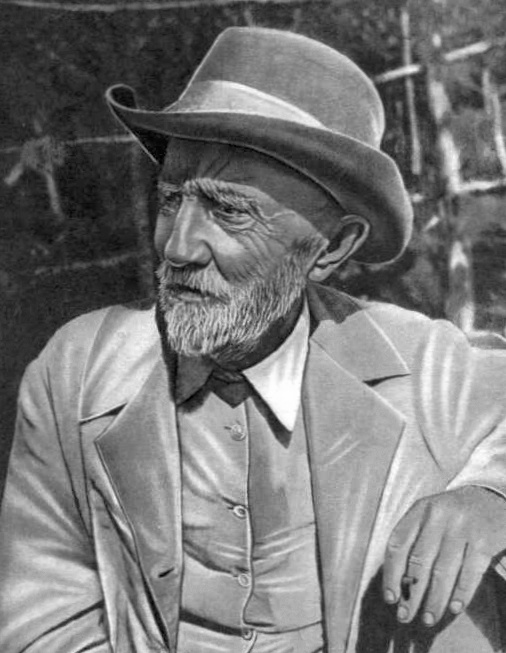
- Born: Ivan Vladimirovich Michurin; 27 October [O.S. 15 October] 1855; Dolgoye, Pronsky Uyezd, Ryazan Governorate, Russian Empire
- Died: June 7, 1935 (aged 79); Michurinsk, Tambov Oblast, RSFSR, Soviet Union
- Known for: Genetic selection of plants
- Scientific career
- Fields: Botany
- Workplaces: VASKhNIL

Ivan Vladimirovich Michurin (Russian: Иван Владимирович Мичурин; 27 October [O.S. 15 October] 1855 – June 7, 1935) was a Russian practitioner of selection to produce new types of crop plants, Honorable Member of the Soviet Academy of Sciences, and academician of the Lenin All-Union Academy of Agriculture.

Throughout all his life, Michurin worked to create new sorts of fruit plants. He introduced over 300 new varieties. He was awarded the Order of Lenin and Order of the Red Banner of Labour for his achievements. The town of Michurinsk is named in his honor, as was the Bulgarian town of Tsarevo between 1950 and 1991.

== Life and work ==
In 1875, Michurin leased a strip of land of about 500 square metres not far from Tambov, began collecting plants, and started his research in pomology and selection. In 1899, he acquired a much bigger strip of land of about 130,000 square metres and moved all of his plants there.

In 1920, right after the end of the Russian Civil War, Vladimir Lenin ordered People's Commissar of Agriculture Semyon Sereda to organize an analytic research project on Michurin's works and practical achievements. On September 11, 1922, Mikhail Kalinin visited Michurin at Lenin's personal request. On November 20, 1923, the Council of People's Commissars recognized Michurin's "fruit garden" as an institution of state importance. In 1928, the Soviets established a selectionist genetic station on the basis of Michurin's garden, which would be re-organized into the Michurin Central Genetic Laboratory in 1934.

Michurin made a major contribution in the development of genetics, especially in the field of pomology. In his cytogenetic laboratory, he researched cell structure and experimented with artificial polyploidy. Michurin studied the aspects of heredity in connection with the natural course of ontogenesis and external influence, creating a whole new concept of predominance. He proved that predominance depends on heredity, ontogenesis, and phylogenesis of the initial cell structure and also on individual features of hybrids and conditions of cultivation. In his works, Michurin assumed a possibility of changing genotype under external influence.

Michurin was one of the founding fathers of scientific agricultural selection. He worked on hybridization of plants of similar and different origins, cultivating methods in connection with the natural course of ontogenesis, directing the process of predominance, evaluation and selection of seedlings, and acceleration of the process of selection with the help of physical and chemical factors.

Michurin's method of crossing of geographically distant plants would be widely used by other selectionists. He worked out theoretical basis and some practical means for hybridization of geographically distant plants. Michurin also proposed means for overcoming the genetic barrier of incompatibility during the process of hybridization, such as pollination of the young hybrids during their first florescence, preliminary vegetative crossing, and use of a “mediator”, pollination with the mix of different kinds of pollen.

The Soviets began to cultivate Michurin's hybrids of apple, pear, cherry, rowan and others. The variety Antonovka is the most famous apple he developed. It is so popular in Russia that it was given the name The People's Apple. It is widely used in Russia and Poland for fresh eating and culinary purposes. In other parts of Europe and North America, it is principally used as a hardy rootstock. Michurin also cultivated hybrids of grape, apricot, sweet cherry and other southern plants in the northern climates.

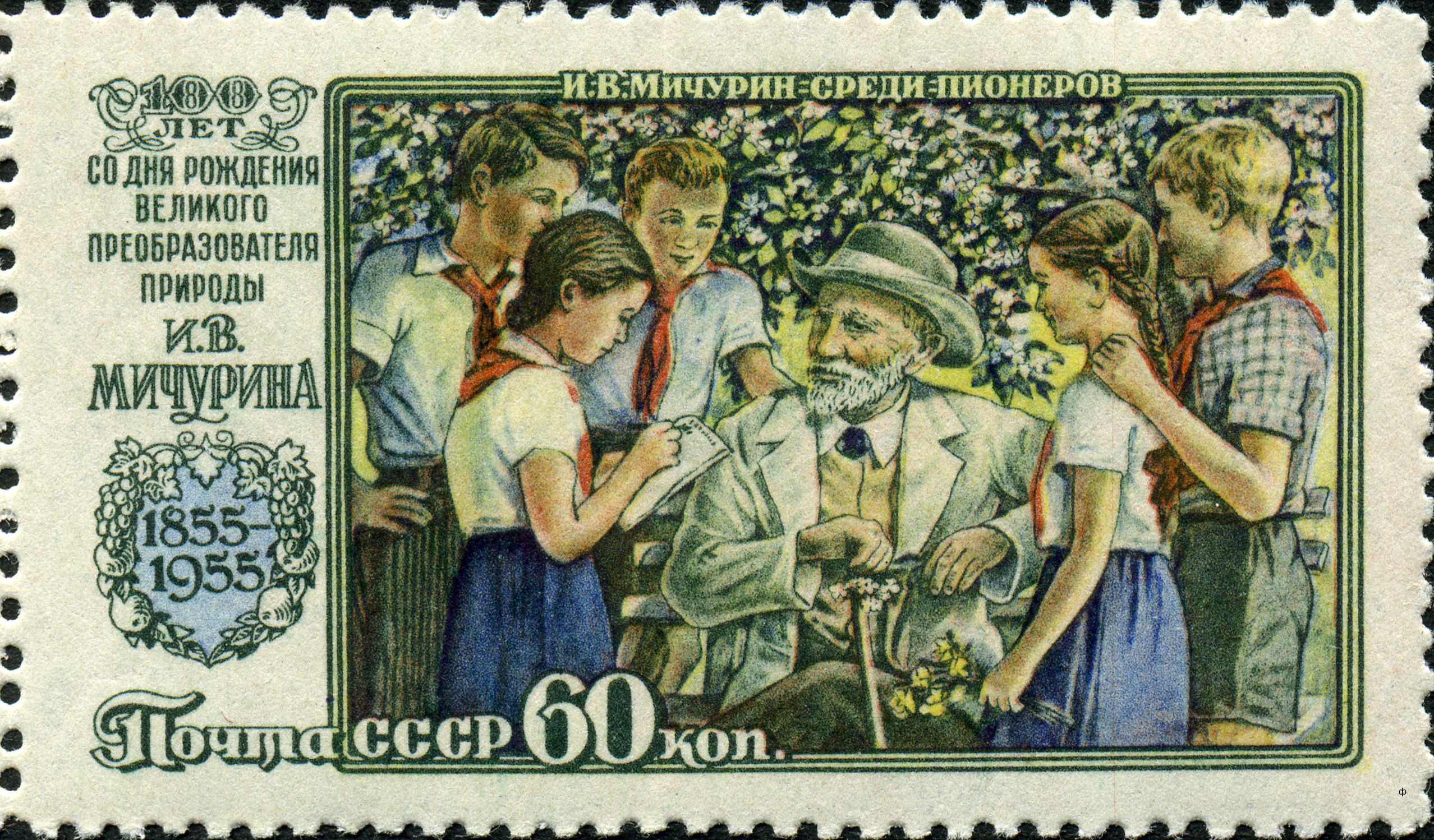
Commemorative Soviet stamp of Michurin, 1956
