= Committee for State Security of the Byelorussian Soviet Socialist Republic =

Byelorussian Branch of the KGB

- Камітэт дзяржаўнай бяспекі Беларускай ССР

Agency overview
- Formed: April 6, 1954
- Preceding agencies: Cheka of the Byelorussian SSR (1918–1922); GPU of the Byelorussian SSR (1922–1923); OGPU of the Byelorussian SSR (1923–1934); NKVD of the Byelorussian SSR (1934–1943); GUGB of the Byelorussian SSR (1934–1941/1941–1943); NKGB (February–July 1941/1943–1946) of the Byelorussian SSR; MGB of the Byelorussian SSR (1946–1953); MVD of the Byelorussian SSR (1953–1954)
- Dissolved: October 23, 1991
- Superseding agency: State Security Committee of the Republic of Belarus
- Jurisdiction: Byelorussian Soviet Socialist Republic
- Agency executives: Alexander Perepelitsyn, First Chairman; Eduard Shirkovsky, Last Chairman

The Committee for State Security of the Byelorussian Soviet Socialist Republic (KGB of the BSSR; Belarusian: Камітэт дзяржаўнай бяспекі Беларускай ССР; Russian: Комитет государственной безопасности Белорусской ССР) was the main state security organization in the Byelorussian Soviet Socialist Republic. It was a branch of the Committee for State Security of USSR.

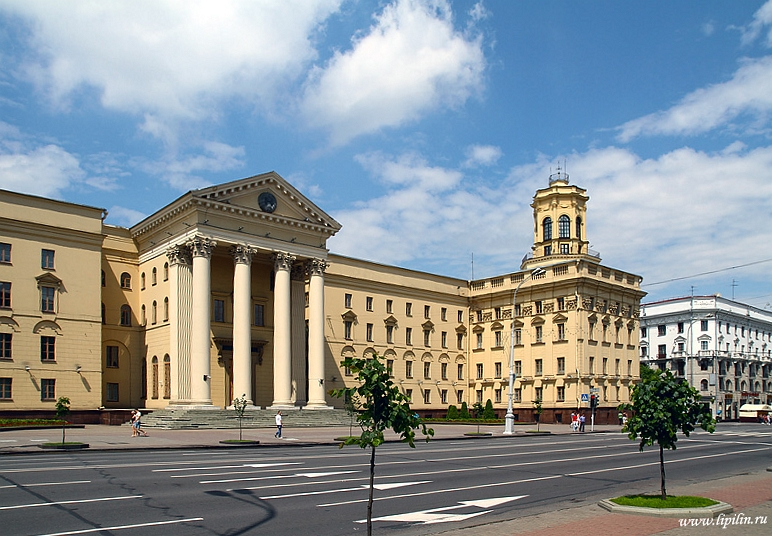
Committee for State Security headquarters in Minsk

== History ==
In the early 20th century, the Russian Cheka led by Felix Dzherzhinsky began operating on Belarusian land. On 1 March 1922, under the auspices, Central Executive Committee of the BSSR, a State Political Directorate is formed. The People's Commissariat for Internal Affairs (NKVD), the KGB's predecessor agency, was in the mid-1950s involved in many Stalinist purges around the country, especially on Belarus. In March 1954, the central government in Moscow began reforms for the Soviet Interior Ministry, during which the Committee for State Security (KGB), was a subordinate agency under Council of Ministers of the Soviet Union. On 19 May 1954, the Soviet government in Belarus made the decision to form a republican affiliate of the KGB, led by Alexander Perepelitsyn. In December 1978, the KGB of the BSSR became an independent institution of the national agency, having responsibility for all assets in Belarus. In September 1991, the Supreme Soviet of Belarus renamed the KGB of the BSSR to the KGB of the Republic of Belarus, which became the new national security body of the state. A month earlier, the Declaration of State Sovereignty of the Byelorussian Soviet Socialist Republic signed, effectively declaring Belarus an independent state from the USSR.

== Chairmen ==
Chairmen of Cheka of the Byelorussian SSR

- Viktor Yarkin (1918–1920)
- Aleksandr Rotenberg (1920–1921)

Chairmen of GPU of the Byelorussian SSR

- Jan Olski (1921–1923)

Chairmen of OGPU the of Byelorussian SSR

- Jan Olski (1923)
- Stanisław Pintal (1923–1924)
- Filipp Medved (1924–1925)
- Roman Pilar (1925–1929)
- Grigoriy Rappoport (1929–1931)
- Stanislav Redens (1931)
- German Matson (1931–1932)
- Leonid Zakovsky (1932–1934)

People's Commissars of Internal Affairs of the Byelorussian SSR

- Leonid Zakovsky (1934)
- Izrail Leplevsky (1934–1936)
- Grigory Molchanov (1936—1937)
- Boris Davydovych Berman (1937–1938)
- Aleksei Nasedkin (1938)
- Lavrentiy Tsanava (1938–1941)

People's Commissars for State Security of the Byelorussian SSR

- Lavrentiy Tsanava (1941)

People's Commissars of Internal Affairs of the Byelorussian SSR

- Aleksandr Matveyev (1941–1942)
- Sergei Belchenko (1942–1943)

People's Commissars for State Security of the Byelorussian SSR

- Lavrentiy Tsanava (1943–1946)

Ministers of State Security of the Byelorussian SSR

- Lavrentiy Tsanava (1946–1951)
- Mikhail Baskakov (1951–1953)

Ministers of Internal Affairs of the Byelorussian SSR

- Mikhail Baskakov (1953–1954)

Chairmen of the KGB under the Council of Ministers of the Byelorussian SSR

- Alexander Perepelitsyn - April 6, 1954 – August 31, 1959
- Vasily Petrov - October 13, 1959 – August 10, 1970
- Yakov Nikulkin - June 23, 1970 – August 4, 1980
- Veniamin Baluev - August 4, 1980 – November 24, 1990
- Eduard Shirkovsky - November 16, 1990 –October 23, 1991

== See also ==
- Soviet repressions in Belarus
