= Doctors' plot =

1951–1953 Soviet anti-semitic campaign

The "doctors' plot" (Russian: дело врачей, romanized: delo vrachey, lit. 'doctors' case') was a Soviet state-sponsored anti-intellectual and antisemitic (under the guise of being anti-cosmopolitan) campaign based on a conspiracy theory that alleged an anti-Soviet cabal of prominent medical specialists, many of whom were ethnically Jewish, intended to murder leading government and Communist Party officials. It was also known as the case of saboteur doctors, doctor-poisoners or killer doctors.

In 1951–1953, a majority-Jewish group of doctors from Moscow were accused of a conspiracy to assassinate Soviet leaders. They were accused of serving the interests of international Jewry, as well as Western (primarily American and British) intelligence. Following this, many doctors were dismissed from their jobs, arrested, and tortured to produce admissions.

A few weeks after Stalin's death in 1953, the new Soviet leadership dropped the case due to a lack of evidence. On 4 April 1953, the Ministry of Internal Affairs declared the case to be a fabrication.

== Beginnings ==
A number of theories attempt to explain the origins of the doctors' plot case. Historians typically relate it to the earlier case of Joseph Stalin's destruction of the Jewish Anti-Fascist Committee and the campaign against the so-called Jewish rootless cosmopolitans in the second half of the 1940s, as well as to the power struggle within the Soviet leadership during that time. The campaign against the doctors was presumably set in motion by Stalin as a pretext to launch a massive purge of the Communist Party, and, according to Edvard Radzinsky, even to consolidate the country for a future World War III.

In 1948, an allegation was made by a Soviet veteran medical worker, Lydia Timashuk, who stated that "intentional distortions in medical conclusions [were] made by major medical experts who served as consultants in the hospital". Timashuk "exposed their criminal designs" and as such the security bodies of the Soviet Union were made aware of the existence of the alleged conspiracy against Stalin. Stalin had strong doubts about Timashuk's allegations. Stalin's daughter, Svetlana Alliluyeva, stated that her father was "very saddened by the turn of events" and that the housekeeper heard him saying that he did not believe the doctors were "dishonest" and that the only evidence against them were the reports of Timashuk.

In 1951, Ministry for State Security (MGB) investigator Mikhail Ryumin reported to his superior, Viktor Abakumov, Minister of the MGB, that Professor Yakov Etinger, who was arrested as a "bourgeois nationalist" with connections to the Jewish Anti-Fascist Committee, had committed malpractice in treating Andrei Zhdanov (died 1948) and Alexander Shcherbakov (died 1945), allegedly with the intention of killing them. However, Abakumov refused to believe the story. Etinger died in prison (2 March 1951) due to interrogations and harsh conditions. Ryumin was then dismissed from his position in the MGB for misappropriating money and was held responsible for the death of Etinger. With the assistance of Georgy Malenkov, Ryumin wrote a letter to Stalin, accusing Abakumov of killing Etinger in order to hide a conspiracy to kill off the Soviet leadership. On 4 July 1951, the Politburo set up a commission (headed by Malenkov and including Lavrentiy Beria) to investigate the issue. Based on the commission's report, the Politburo soon passed a resolution on the "bad situation in the MGB" and Abakumov was fired.

Beria and Malenkov both tried to use the situation to expand their power through gaining control of the MGB.

== Arrests ==
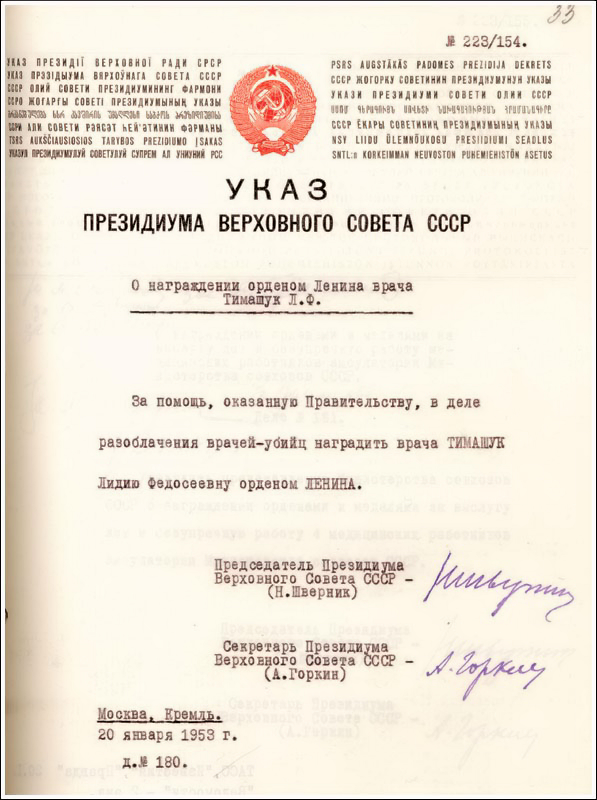
Ukaz awarding Lydia Timashuk the Order of Lenin for "unmasking killer-doctors"

Abakumov was arrested and tortured soon after being dismissed as head of the MGB. He was charged with being a sympathizer and protector of the criminal Jewish underground. This arrest was followed by the arrests of many agents who worked for him in the central apparatus of the MGB.

The killer doctors case was revived in 1952 when the letter from cardiologist Lydia Timashuk was dug up from the archives. In 1948, Timashuk had written a letter to the head of Stalin's security, General Nikolai Vlasik, explaining that Zhdanov had suffered a heart attack, but the Kremlin doctors who were treating him had missed it and had prescribed the wrong treatment for him. Zhdanov soon died and the doctors covered up their mistake. The letter, however, was originally ignored. In 1953, Timashuk was awarded the Order of Lenin (later revoked) "for the assistance in unmasking killer doctors", and for a long time Timashuk had an unjust stigma of the instigator of this persecution of doctors after Khrushchev in his "Secret Speech" mentioned her in this respect.

The arrests started in September 1952. Vlasik was fired as head of Stalin's security and eventually also arrested for ignoring the Timashuk letter.

Initially, 37 people were arrested including 17 Jews. Under torture, prisoners seized in the investigation of the alleged plot were compelled to produce evidence against themselves and their associates.

Stalin accused the MGB of incompetence. He demanded that the interrogations of doctors already under arrest be accelerated. Stalin complained that there was no clear picture of the Zionist conspiracy and no solid evidence that specifically the Jewish doctors were guilty.

KGB archives provide evidence that Stalin forwarded the collected interrogation materials to Malenkov, Khrushchev and other "potential victims of the doctors' plot".

== Media campaign ==
Stalin ordered the news agency TASS and Pravda, the official newspaper of the CPSU, to issue reports about the uncovering of a doctors' plot to assassinate top Soviet leaders, including Stalin himself. The possible goal of the campaign was to set the stage for show trials. Other sources say that the initiative came from Beria and Malenkov, who continued to use the plot for their own interests. Beria pushed the Politburo to publicize the plot on 9 January 1953. For him, it was especially important that the doctors' plot got more attention than the Mingrelian Affair, which personally affected him.

On 13 January 1953, nine eminent doctors in Moscow were accused of taking part in a vast plot to poison members of the top Soviet political and military leadership. Pravda reported the accusations under the headline "Vicious Spies and Killers under the Mask of Academic Physicians":

Today the TASS news agency reported the arrest of a group of saboteur-doctors. This terrorist group, uncovered some time ago by organs of state security, had as their goal shortening the lives of leaders of the Soviet Union by means of medical sabotage.

Investigation established that participants in the terrorist group, exploiting their position as doctors and abusing the trust of their patients, deliberately and viciously undermined their patients' health by making incorrect diagnoses, and then killed them with bad and incorrect treatments. Covering themselves with the noble and merciful calling of physicians, men of science, these fiends and killers dishonored the holy banner of science. Having taken the path of monstrous crimes, they defiled the honor of scientists.

Among the victims of this band of inhuman beasts were Comrades A. A. Zhdanov and A. S. Shcherbakov. The criminals confessed that, taking advantage of the illness of Comrade Zhdanov, they intentionally concealed a myocardial infarction, prescribed inadvisable treatments for this serious illness and thus killed Comrade Zhdanov. Killer doctors, by incorrect use of very powerful medicines and prescription of harmful regimens, shortened the life of Comrade Shcherbakov, leading to his death.

The majority of the participants of the terrorist group - Vovsi, B. Kogan, Feldman, Grinstein, Etinger and others - were bought by American intelligence. They were recruited by a branch-office of American intelligence – the international Jewish bourgeois-nationalist organization called "Joint." The filthy face of this Zionist spy organization, covering up their vicious actions under the mask of charity, is now completely revealed…

Other participants in the terrorist group (Vinogradov, M. Kogan, Egorov) were discovered, as has been presently determined, to have been long-time agents of English intelligence, serving it for many years, carrying out its most criminal and sordid tasks. The bigwigs of the USA and their English junior partners know that to achieve domination over other nations by peaceful means is impossible. Feverishly preparing for a new world war, they energetically send spies inside the USSR and the people's democratic countries: they attempt to accomplish what the Hitlerites could not do — to create in the USSR their own subversive "fifth column."...

The Soviet people should not for a minute forget about the need to heighten their vigilance in all ways possible, to be alert for all schemes of war-mongers and their agents, to constantly strengthen the Armed Forces and the intelligence organs of our government."

Others mentioned included:

- Solomon Mikhoels (actor-director of the Moscow State Jewish Theater and the head of the Jewish Anti-Fascist Committee, assassinated in January 1948), who was called a "well-known Jewish bourgeois nationalist"
- Miron Vovsi (therapist, Stalin's personal physician and a cousin of Mikhoels)
- Vladimir Nikitich Vinogradov (therapist), also a personal doctor to Stalin
- Mikhail Kogan (therapist)
- Boris Kogan (therapist)
- P. Yegorov (therapist)
- A. Feldman (otolaryngologist)
- Yakov Etinger (therapist)
- Aleksandr Grinshtein (neuropathologist)
- G. Mayorov (therapist)
- L. H. Kechker [ru] (therapist, professor)

Although the majority of accused were not Jewish, six of the nine mentioned doctors were.

The list of alleged victims included high-ranked officials Andrei Zhdanov, Aleksandr Shcherbakov, Army Marshals Aleksandr Vasilevsky, Leonid Govorov and Ivan Konev, General Sergei Shtemenko, Admiral Gordey Levchenko and others.

Pravda intended to publish a letter signed by many prominent Soviet Jews in response to the plot. Approximately 50 people read the letter and approximately 40 signed the letter. The letter aimed to distance the accused doctors from the Soviet Jewish public and reassert Jewish support for the Soviet government. Two versions of the letter were created, but it was never published. Either Stalin eventually decided not to publish it or it was still being worked on at the time of his death.

== Stalin's death and the consequences ==
After Stalin's death on 5 March 1953, the new leadership quickly dismissed all charges related to the plot; the doctors were exonerated in a 31 March decree by the newly appointed Minister of Internal Affairs, Lavrentiy Beria, and on 6 April, this was communicated to the public in Pravda. Chief MGB investigator and Deputy Minister of State Security Mikhail Ryumin was accused of fabricating the plot, arrested and later executed. A Komsomol official, Nikolai Mesyatsev, was assigned by Malenkov to review the doctors' plot case and quickly found that it was fabricated.

There is a tale in the Hasidic Chabad movement that Stalin became sick as a consequence of some metaphysical intervention of the seventh Chabad leader, Rabbi Menachem Mendel Schneerson, during the recitation of a public discourse at a Purim gathering in 1953, which supposedly caused Stalin's death and averted massive deportations of Soviet Jews to Siberia that were to take place as a result of the anti-intellectual campaign surrounding the doctor's plot affair.

== Khrushchev's statements ==
In his 1956 "Secret Speech", First Secretary Nikita Khrushchev stated that the doctors' plot was "fabricated... set up by Stalin," but that Stalin did not "have the time in which to bring it to an end," which saved the doctors' lives. Khrushchev also told the session that Stalin called the judge in the case and, regarding the methods to be used, stated "beat, beat, and beat again." Stalin supposedly told his Minister of State Security, "If you do not obtain confessions from the doctors we will shorten you by a head."

Khrushchev also claimed that Stalin hinted to him to incite antisemitism in Ukraine, saying, "The good workers at the factory should be given clubs so they can beat the hell out of those Jews."

According to Khrushchev, Stalin told Politburo members, "You are blind like young kittens. What will happen without me? The country will perish because you do not know how to recognize enemies."

Khrushchev asserted that Stalin intended to use the doctors' trial to launch a massive purge of the Communist Party.

== Alleged planned deportation of Jews ==
Soviet historian Samson Madievsky has advanced a view, based on various memoirs and secondary evidence, that the doctors' plot case was intended to trigger the mass repression and deportation of the Jews to the Jewish Autonomous Oblast, similar to the deportations of many other ethnic minorities in the Soviet Union, but the plan was not accomplished because of the sudden death of Stalin.

According to Louis Rapoport, the alleged deportation was planned to start with the public execution of the imprisoned doctors, and then the "following incidents would follow": "attacks on Jews orchestrated by the secret police, the publication of the statement by the prominent Jews, and a flood of other letters demanding that action be taken. A three-stage program of genocide would be followed. First, almost all Soviet Jews ... would be shipped to camps east of the Urals ... Second, the authorities would set Jewish leaders at all levels against one another ... Also the MGB [Secret Police] would start killing the elites in the camps, just as they had killed the Yiddish writers ... the previous year [Night of the Murdered Poets]. The ... final stage would be to 'get rid of the rest.'"

Four large camps were built in southern and western Siberia shortly before Stalin's death in 1953, and there were rumors that they were for Jews. A special "Deportation Commission" to plan the deportation of Jews to these camps was allegedly created. Nikolay Poliakov, the presumed secretary of the "Commission", stated years later that, according to Stalin's initial plan, the deportation was to begin in the middle of February 1953, but the monumental tasks of compiling lists of Jews had not yet been completed. "Pure blooded" Jews were to be deported first, followed by "half-breeds" (polukrovki). Before his death in March 1953, Stalin allegedly had planned the execution of doctors' plot defendants already on trial in Red Square in March 1953, and then he would cast himself as the savior of Soviet Jews by sending them to camps away from the purportedly enraged Russian populace. There are further statements that describe some aspects of such a planned deportation.

Historian Yakov Etinger described how former CPSU Politburo member Nikolai Bulganin said that Stalin asked him in the end of February 1953 to prepare railroad cars for the mass deportation of Jews to the Jewish Autonomous Oblast. According to a book by another Soviet Politburo member Alexander Yakovlev, Stalin started preparations for the deportation of Jews in February 1953 and ordered preparation of a letter from a group of notable Soviet Jews with a request to the Soviet government to carry out the mass deportation of Jews in order to save them from "the just wrath of Soviet people." The letter had to be published in the newspaper Pravda and was found later. According to historian Samson Madiyevsky, the deportation was definitely considered, and the only thing in question is the time-frame.

However, Russian historian Zhores Medvedev argued against these allegations, saying that no documents were found in support of the deportation plan. In addition, while historian Joshua Rubenstein argues it would not have been so unusual for an idea like this to not show up in documentation, he argues that the evidence is still weak and many of it has better, more plausible explanations. For example, he argues that many Russian leaders at the time may have propped up stories like this to increase their reputations by claiming they convinced Stalin to relent.

== In popular culture ==
- Red Monarch (1983)
- Stalin (1992)
- The Death of Stalin (2017)

== See also ==
- 1968 Polish political crisis
- Dmitry Pletnyov (doctor) – Soviet doctor that performed a clinical diagnosis of Stalin and was later executed in 1941.
- Purge of Ana Pauker
- Anti-Jewish violence in Central and Eastern Europe, 1944–1946
- Antisemitism in the Soviet Union
- History of the Jews in Russia
- Khrustalyov, My Car!
- Slánský trial
- Refusenik
- Soviet Jewry movement
- Joseph Stalin and antisemitism
- Lina Stern – The sole survivor of the Night of the Murdered Poets
- Vladimir Bekhterev – Soviet neurologist that performed a diagnosis of Stalin and died a day later under suspicious circumstances in 1927.
- The Betrayal – 2010 historical novel by Helen Dunmore
