= Yakov Gilyarievich Etinger =

Soviet physician (1887–1951)

Yakov Gilyarievich Etinger (Russian: Яков Гиляриевич Этингер; 22 December 1887 – 2 March 1951) was a Soviet medical doctor. He was one of the accused in the Doctor's Plot in 1952-1953, an alleged Zionist plot to kill off the Soviet leadership. Dr. Etinger was tortured by Mikhail Ryumin, the Deputy Minister of State Security, who then reported to Minister Viktor Abakumov, who did not believe there was a plot although he and Ryumin were both present at a later interrogation of Dr. Etinger. Yet another interrogation in the presence of Abakumov was to follow the next morning, in Ryumin's hope to convince Abakumov that such a case existed, but Etinger died under interrogation during the night.
