= Ryazan Governorate =

1796–1929 unit of Russia

Coordinates: 54.6167°N 39.7167°E

Ryazan Governorate Рязанская губерния
- Governorate of the Russian Empire
- 1796–1929
- Coat of arms

- Location within the Russian Empire
- Capital: Ryazan
- History
  - Established: 1796
  - Disestablished: 1929

Ryazan Governorate (Russian: Рязанская губерния, romanized: Ryazanskaya guberniya) was an administrative-territorial unit (guberniya) of the Russian Empire and the Russian SFSR, which existed from 1796 to 1929. Its capital was in Ryazan.

== Administrative division ==
Ryazan Governorate consisted of the following uyezds (administrative centres in parentheses):

- Dankovsky Uyezd (Dankov)
- Yegoryevsky Uyezd (Yegoryevsk)
- Zaraysky Uyezd (Zaraysk)
- Kasimovsky Uyezd (Kasimov)
- Mikhaylovsky Uyezd (Mikhaylov)
- Pronsky Uyezd (Pronsk)
- Ranenburgsky Uyezd (Ranenburg)
- Ryazhsky Uyezd (Ryazhsk)
- Ryazansky Uyezd (Ryazan)
- Sapozhkovsky Uyezd (Sapozhok)
- Skopinsky Uyezd (Skopin)
- Spassky Uyezd (Spassk)

== Notable people ==
- Ivan Vladimirovich Michurin (1855–1935), plant breeder, was born in Pronsky Uyezd.
- Konstantin Tsiolkovsky (1857-1935), Russian scientist famous for developing the Tsiolkovsky rocket equation
- John Kochurov (1871–1917), Orthodox priest and missionary; first priest-martyr of the Bolshevik Revolution, was born in the Ryazan Governorate.
