= Eastern Bloc politics =

Politics during Soviet occupation of Eastern Europe

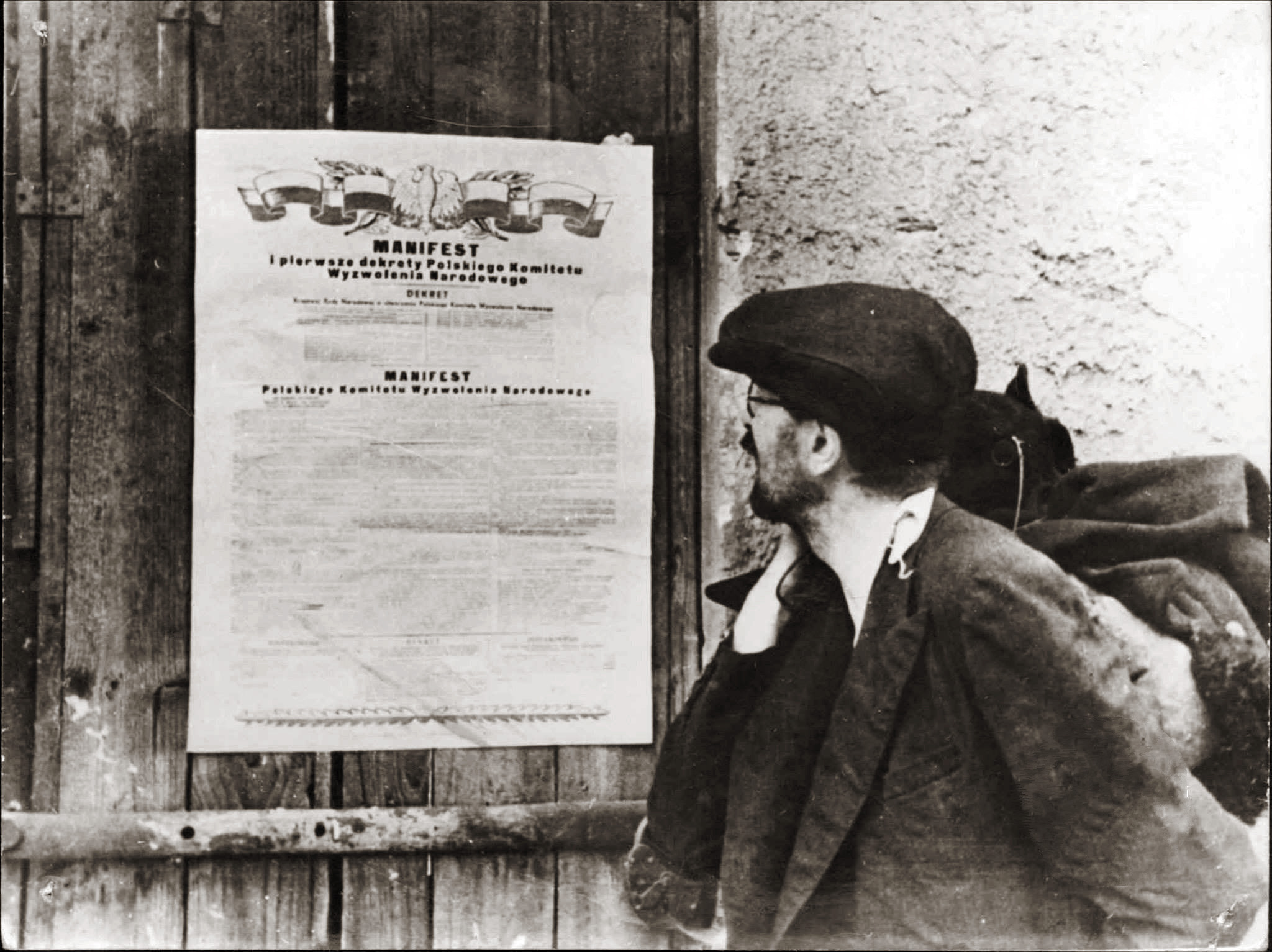
A propaganda photo of a citizen reading the PKWN Manifesto, edited by Joseph Stalin, posted after the 1944 Soviet occupation of Poland in World War II before it was transformed into the Polish People's Republic.

Eastern Bloc politics followed the Red Army's occupation of much of Central and Eastern Europe at the end of World War II and the Soviet Union's installation of Soviet-controlled Marxist–Leninist governments in the region that would be later called the Eastern Bloc through a process of bloc politics and repression. These governments contained apparent elements of representative democracy (such as the supreme organ of state power, elections, and sometimes even multiple political parties) to conceal the process initially.

Once in power, each country's Soviet-controlled Communist Party took permanent control of the administration, political organs, police, societal organizations and economic structures to ensure that no effective opposition could arise and to control socioeconomic and political life therein. Party and social purges were employed along with the extensive use of secret police organizations modelled on the Soviet KGB to monitor and control local populations. While multiple political parties continued to exist in some countries nominally, they were all subordinated to the government, and supported government policies. While elections continued to be held, voters were usually presented with a single candidate. The supreme organs of state power composed of representatives elected in this manner met infrequently and always approved government proposals.

== Background ==
=== Creation of the Eastern Bloc ===
Map of the Eastern Bloc

In 1922, the Russian Soviet Federative Socialist Republic (RSFSR), the Ukrainian SSR, the Byelorussian SSR and the Transcaucasian SFSR, approved the Treaty of Creation of the USSR and the Declaration of the Creation of the USSR, forming the Soviet Union. At the end of World War II by mid-1945, all eastern and central European capitals were controlled by the Soviet Union. During the final stages of the war, the Soviet Union began the creation of the Eastern Bloc by directly annexing several countries as Soviet Socialist Republics that were originally effectively ceded to it by Nazi Germany in the Molotov–Ribbentrop Pact. Eastern Poland, eastern Finland, the Baltics, the Northern half of Bukovina and Bessarabia, now called Moldova, were forcibly incorporated into the Soviet Union. The eastern Polish territories remain part of Ukraine and Belarus, as of the early 21st century.

Red Army and NKVD personnel began to impose the communist system in 1939. They made extensive use of local communists, socialists, and their collaborators to wage a campaign of mass violence and mass deportations to camps in order to "Sovietize" the areas under their occupation. The Soviet invasion of these areas in 1939 created local allies and produced NKVD officers experienced in imposing the communist system. The Soviet Union began planning the transformation of Eastern Europe even before the 1941 Nazi invasion of the USSR. There is evidence that the USSR did not expect to create a communist bloc quickly or easily. Ivan Maiskii, Soviet foreign minister under Stalin, wrote in 1944 that all European nations would eventually become communist states but only after a period of three to four decades.

Central and Eastern European communist leaders generally participated in "national front" coalitions during the 1930s to oppose Nazi expansion. These coalitions were modeled upon those of Spain and France. Historian Tony Judt described the civil war in Spain as "a dry run for the seizure of power in Eastern Europe after 1945."

These included Eastern Poland (annexed by the Soviet Union), Latvia (became Latvia SSR), Estonia (became Estonian SSR), Lithuania (became Lithuania SSR), part of eastern Finland (became Karelo-Finnish SSR) and northeastern Romania (part of which became the Moldavian SSR). By 1945, these additional annexed countries totaled approximately 180,000 additional square miles (465,000 km^{2}), or slightly more than the area of West Germany, East Germany and Austria combined.

Other states were converted into Soviet Satellite states, such as the Polish People's Republic, the People's Republic of Bulgaria, the People's Republic of Hungary, the Czechoslovak Socialist Republic, the Romanian People's Republic, the People's Republic of Albania, and later the German Democratic Republic from the Soviet zone of German occupation. The Federal People's Republic of Yugoslavia was also considered part of the Bloc, though a Tito–Stalin split occurred in 1948

=== Conditions in the Eastern Bloc ===
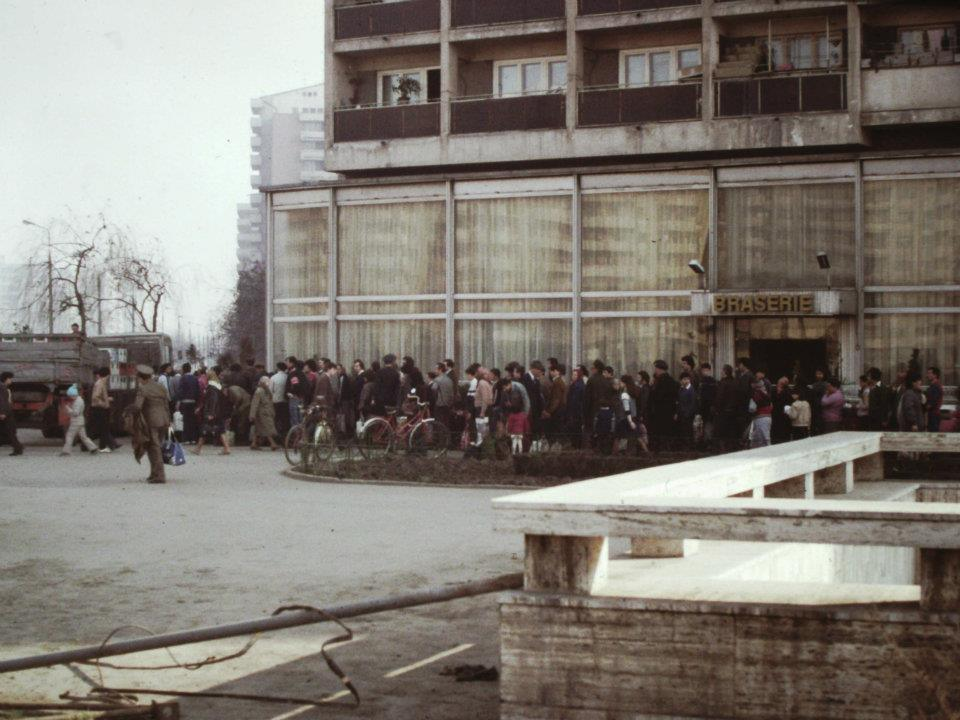
A line for the distribution of cooking oil in Bucharest, Romania in May 1986.

Throughout the Eastern Bloc, both in the Soviet Socialist Republic and the rest of the Bloc, Russia was given prominence, and referred to as the naibolee vydajuščajasja nacija (the most prominent nation) and the rukovodjaščij narod (the leading people). The Soviets encouraged the worship of everything Russian and the reproduction of their own Communist structural hierarchies in each of the Bloc states.

The defining characteristic of communism implemented in the Eastern Bloc was the unique symbiosis of the state with society and the economy, resulting in politics and economics losing their distinctive features as autonomous and distinguishable spheres. While over 15 million Eastern Bloc residents migrated westward from 1945 to 1949, emigration was effectively halted in the early 1950s, with the Soviet approach to controlling national movement emulated by most of the rest of the Eastern Bloc. The Soviets mandated expropriation and etatization of private property.

The Soviet-style "replica regimes" that arose in the Bloc not only reproduced Soviet command economies, but also adopted the brutal methods employed by Joseph Stalin and Soviet secret police to suppress real and potential opposition. Furthermore, the Eastern Bloc experienced economic mis-development by central planners resulting in those countries following a path of extensive rather than intensive development, and lagged far behind their western European counterparts in per capita Gross Domestic Product. In addition, media in the Eastern Bloc served as an organ of the state, completely reliant on and subservient to the communist party. The state owned radio and television organizations while print media was usually owned by political organizations, mostly by the ruling communist party.

== Seizing control ==
=== Early history ===
The Socialist Unity Party of Germany emblem represented the handshake between Communist Wilhelm Pieck and Social Democrat Otto Grotewohl when their parties were forcibly merged in 1946

The initial issue arising in countries occupied by the Red Army in 1944 and 1945 was the manner in which to transform occupation power into control over domestic development. At first, western countries' willingness to support "antifascist" action and for "democratization" with a socialist element helped Soviet efforts to permit communists in their respective countries to initiate a process of gradual almost imperceptibly slow Sovietization. Because communists were relatively small minorities in all countries except Czechoslovakia, they were initially instructed to form coalitions in their respective countries. John Gunther noted in 1949 that the prime ministers of Poland, Romania, and Hungary, and eight of 26 Yugoslav government ministers were not Communist. Talented non-Communists willingly worked within Communist governments.

At the war's end, concealment of the Kremlin's role was considered crucial to neutralize resistance and to make the regimes appear not only led by local people, but also to resemble "bourgeois democracies". Gunther said that he never saw a Russian during his tour of the Eastern Bloc. To maintain the pretense of independence, all Russian troops and ambassadors were hidden. The local rulers were all Soviet-trained, however, and often visited Moscow for orders.

Joseph Stalin had already effectively sealed off outside access to the Soviet Union since 1935 (and until his death), effectively permitting no foreign travel inside the Soviet Union such that outsiders did not know of the political processes that had taken place therein. During this period, and even for 25 years after Stalin's death, the few diplomats and foreign correspondents permitted inside the Soviet Union were usually restricted to within a few miles of Moscow, their phones were tapped, their residences were restricted to foreigner-only locations and they were constantly followed by Soviet authorities. Dissenters who approached such foreigners were arrested. For many years after World War II, even the best informed foreigners did not know the number of arrested or executed Soviet citizens, or how poorly the Soviet economy had performed.

In the other countries of the Bloc, Stalin stated that the Eastern European version of democracy was a mere modification of western "bourgeois democracy." Consequently, Soviet takeover of control at the outset generally followed a three-stage "bloc politics" process:

(i) a general coalition of left-wing, antifascist forces;

(ii) a bogus coalition in which communists neutralized those in other parties not willing to accept communist supremacy; and

(iii) complete communist domination, frequently exercised in a new party formed by the fusion of communist and other leftist groups.

At the same time, Soviet advisers were placed in government institutions, with higher concentrations in the army and the police, while trade agreements gave the USSR a preponderant influence in local economies. The result of the process was that, from 1944 to 1948 in the Eastern Bloc, political parties, organizations, voluntary associations and territorial communities were covertly steered to gradually incapacitate, dissolve, and spend themselves by their own efforts in various processes.

=== Socioeconomic reforms ===
Stalin felt that socioeconomic transformation was indispensable to establish Soviet control, reflecting the Marxist-Leninist view that material bases—the distribution of the means of production—shaped social and political relations. This "sovietization" involved the gradual assimilation of local political, socioeconomic, and cultural patterns into the Soviet model while severing ties with "bourgeois" Western values and traditions. Moscow trained cadres were placed into crucial power positions to fulfill orders regarding sociopolitical transformation. Elimination of the bourgeoisie's social and financial power by expropriation of landed and industrial property was accorded absolute priority. These measures were publicly billed as reforms rather than socioeconomic transformations. Throughout the whole of eastern Europe, except for Czechoslovakia, organizations such as trade unions and associations representing various social, professional and other groups, were erected with only one organization for each category, with competition excluded. Those organizations were managed by communist cadres, though some diversity was permitted initially. Soviet and local concerns formed "joint stock companies" permitting Soviet officials to exercise direct control over important sections of the economy.

Gunther wrote that a reason why Communism took power in the Eastern Bloc was the lack of experience, except in Czechoslovakia, with Western-style democracy. Before World War II the nations had either "colossally inefficient and corrupt" parliaments or were "feudal oligarchies dominated by Fascist reactionaries or royal dictatorships". A former serf who now had some land, schools for his children, and promise of roads and electricity "may be pardoned", Gunther wrote, "if he pays more attention to the propaganda of Moscow than of reactionary refugees in New York ... The communization of eastern Europe is a penalty the people bear for the grievous sins and avarice of th regimes that went before".

Large estates had been broken up, but Moscow was planning Soviet-style collectivization. Most small businesses were not nationalized but were still a "helpless prisoner", Gunther wrote, via government wage and price controls: "Sooner or later the bourgeoisie will disappear".

=== Concealment ===
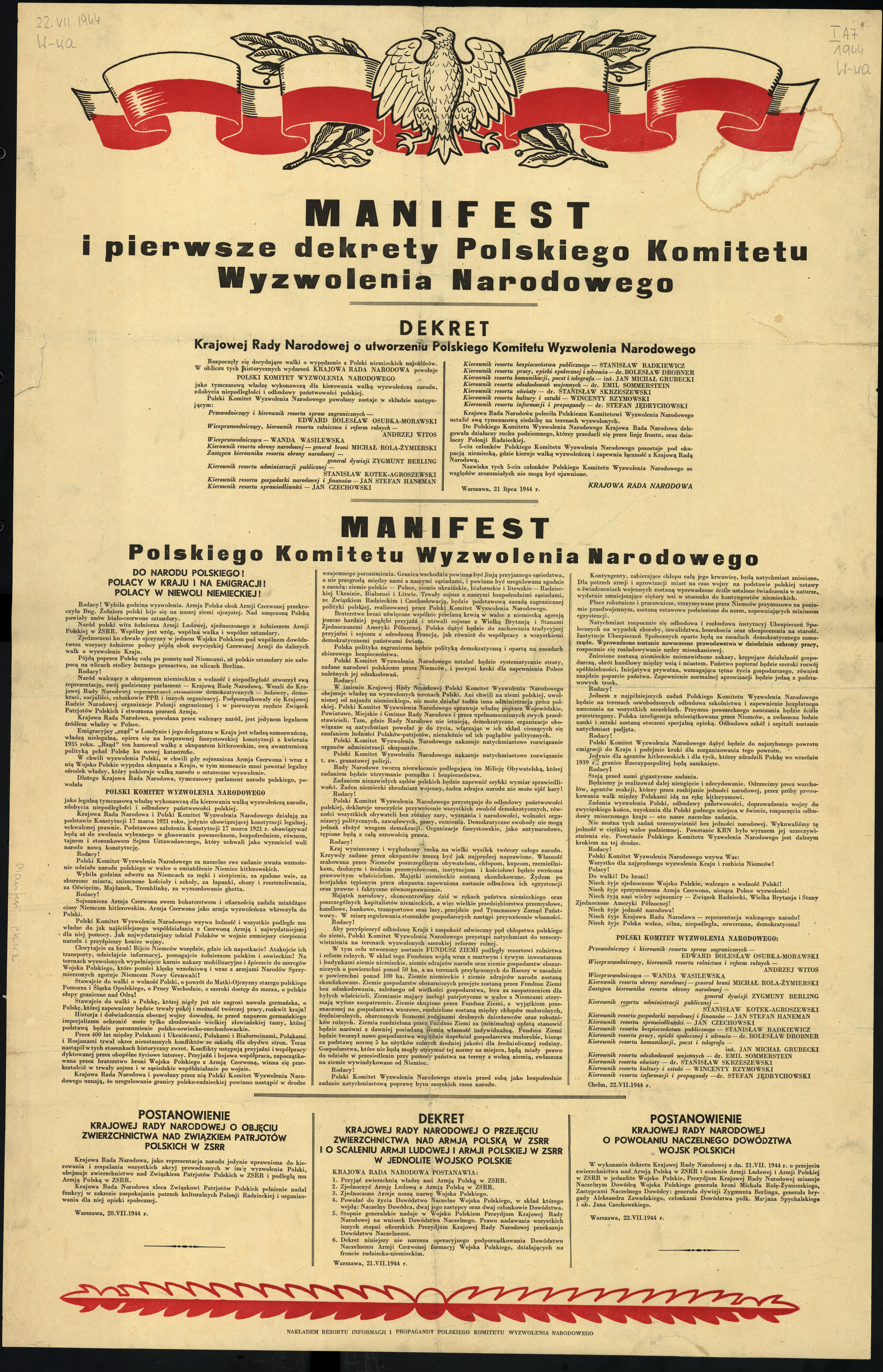
Photo of the Polish PKWN Manifesto

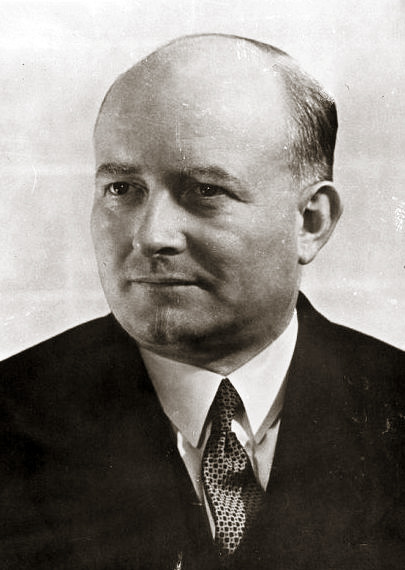
Pre-World War II Polish Prime Minister Stanisław Mikołajczyk returned to Poland in 1946 after facing arrest following Bloc politics, persecution, and vote rigging

At first, the Soviet Union concealed its role, with the transformations appearing as a modification of western "bourgeois democracy." As one young communist was told in East Germany: "it's got to look democratic, but we must have everything in our control."

With the initial exception of Czechoslovakia, activities by political parties had to adhere to "Bloc politics", with parties eventually having to accept membership in an "antifascist" "bloc" obliging them to act only in mutual "consensus". Moscow cadres in key positions would refuse via veto to provide consensus for opposed changes, while those who opposed communist proposed changes were accused of insubordination to Soviet authorities, frequently followed by harsh punishment. When such measures did not produce the desired effect, occupation officers would directly intervene. Accordingly, elections—which had been promised to the Western allies—did not offer a difference in policy choices.

Bloc politics eventually forced purported bourgeois politicians and parties to choose between unconditional political surrender and outright rejection. If they chose the former, they would alienate their followers and marginalize themselves, while the latter case led to defamation as deviators from the "anti-fascist democratic consensus" and "traitors" to the people, followed by ensuing isolation, prosecution, and liquidation.

Consequently, the bloc system permitted the Soviet Union to exercise Eastern Bloc domestic control indirectly. "Bourgeois" politicians willing to follow communist bloc leadership and to support socioeconomic reforms were recruited to further the illusion of classical democracy. Similar non-communist officials were put in place in some administration positions, while a reliable communist cadre worked behind the scenes to control the apparatus and decision-making process. Crucial departments such as those responsible for personnel, education, general police, secret police, and youth, were strictly communist run. From the outset, the multiparty system established by Soviet occupation authorities was planned to be temporary. Two kinds of alliances were envisaged: permanent "natural" alliances with related social forces such as peasants willing to submit to communist vanguard parties and temporary accords with bourgeois parties necessary for temporary objectives. Parties, such as Social Democrats, were seen as belonging to the permanent natural category, but would be eventually expected to undergo transformations. Moscow cadres distinguished "progressive forces" from "reactionary elements", and rendered both powerless through self-emasculation or future self-sacrifice. Such procedures were repeated continuously until communists had gained unlimited power, while only politicians who were unconditionally supportive of Soviet policy remained.

== Political systems ==
=== People's democracy ===
Despite the initial institutional design of communism implemented by Joseph Stalin in the Eastern Bloc (see Stalinism), subsequent development varied across countries. In satellite states, after peace treaties were initially concluded, opposition was essentially liquidated, fundamental steps toward socialism were enforced, and Kremlin leaders sought to strengthen control therein. While communism came to power in the Soviet Union following the Russian Civil War, of some embarrassment to the ruling regimes was that, in the rest of the Eastern Bloc, it came to power with the occupation of the Red Army. What emerged is what Hungarian communist László Rajk (who was later executed) called "a dictatorship of the proletariat without the Soviet form", a "people's democracy." The defining characteristic of communism implemented therein was the unique symbiosis of the state with society and the economy, resulting in politics and economics losing their distinctive features as autonomous and distinguishable spheres. Initially, Stalin directed systems that rejected Western institutional characteristics of market economies, democratic governance (dubbed "bourgeois democracy" in Soviet parlance), and the rule of law subduing discretional intervention by the state. The resulting states aspired to total control of a political center backed by an extensive and active repressive apparatus, and a central justification of ostensibly Marxist-Leninist ideology.

=== Vestiges of "bourgeois democracy" ===
Vestigial democratic institutions were never entirely destroyed, resulting in facade of representative institutions. The supreme organs of state power rubber-stamped decisions made by ruling parties. So little attention was paid to them that some of those serving in the supreme organs of state power were actually dead and officials would sometimes openly state that they would seat members who had lost elections. Constitutions were promulgated but never enforced. Government institutions practiced democratic centralism, where subordinate organs of the party and state unconditionally supported the decisions of senior party leaders. Decisions of consequence were made by the ruling communist parties, which were not political parties in the western sense, but apparatuses for totalitarian control of the state and society. They did not represent sectional interests, they imposed them. The supreme organs of state power were elected, but their meetings occurred only a few days per year and they served only to create legitimacy for politburo decisions.

=== Ruling parties ===
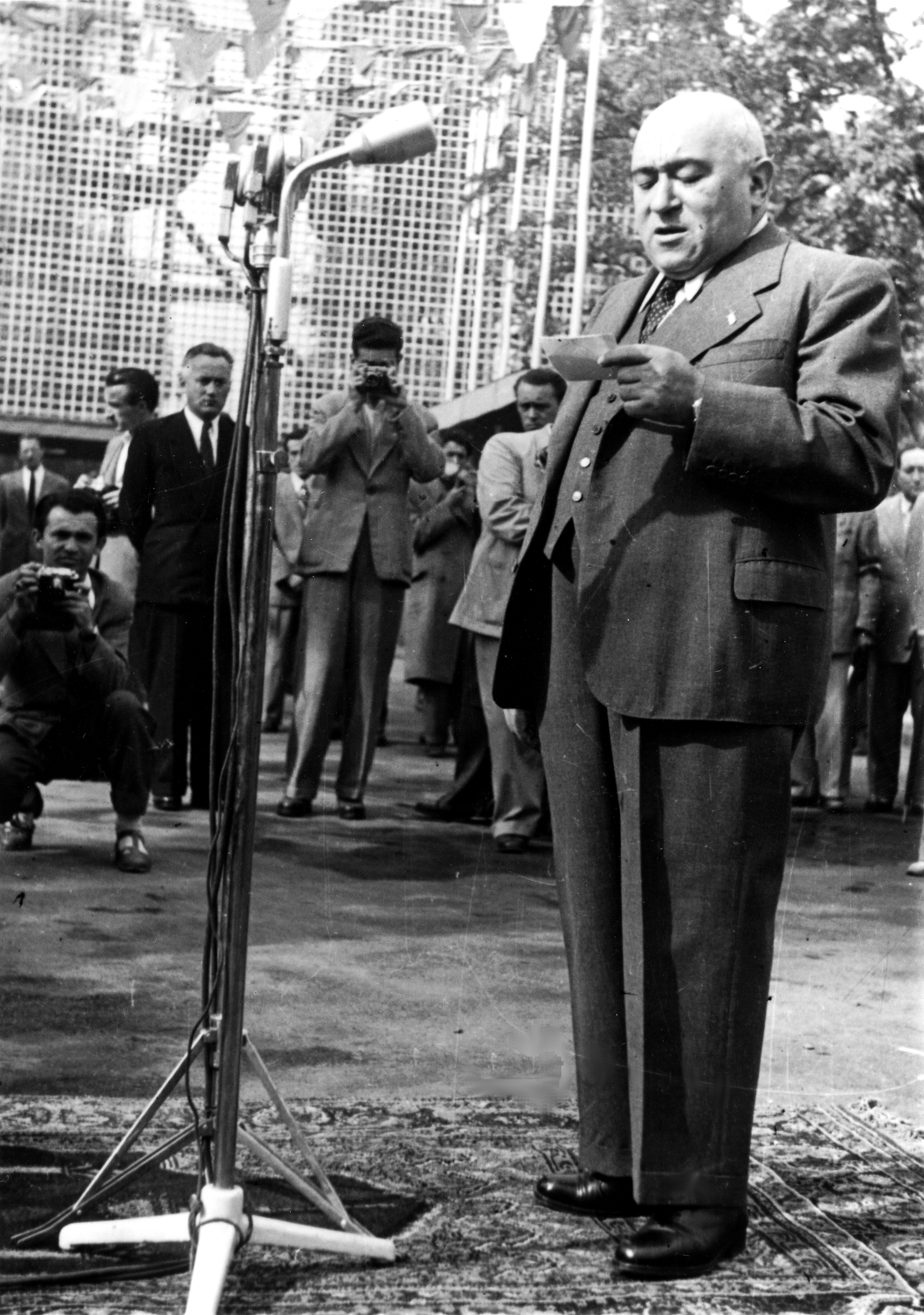
People's Republic of Hungary Stalinist leader Mátyás Rákosi, called the "bald murderer" for running a harsh dictatorship, who was the General Secretary of the Hungarian Communist Party

Non-Soviet Eastern Bloc Communist Parties held congresses every five years, not long after the Soviet Communist Party had held its congress, to elect central committees and endorse new party programs, though "central committees could call emergency" congresses. Attendance at party congresses was frequently given as a reward for long service. Parties also sometimes held national conferences to address specific issues.

The Central Committees usually met in full, or plenary, sessions two to three times per year to elect members of the politburo and the communist party "secretariat", which numbered 15-20 senior party individuals who each was in charge of a department of the party secretariat. These departments were either party "shadows" of the actual government departments they ended up governing (e.g., agriculture, foreign affairs, education, etc.) or party specific institutions in charge of cadres or a party control commission that investigated any alleged infringements of party discipline.

The General Secretary or First Secretary of the Central Committee was the most powerful figure in each regime. He exercised his day-to-day authority through the politburo or presidium, which generally possessed 10-15 full members. During the Stalinist period, the head of the party also led the executive branch, with variations in the practice occurring after Stalin's death, though executive authority always resided in the party's highest organs. In Romania after the mid-1960s, no politburo existed and, instead, General Secretary Nicolae Ceauşescu nominated a small permanent executive committee from which he nominated a small permanent bureau consisting of himself, his wife, and four to five other members. In general, the longer the First or General Secretary was in office, the more powerful he became, and he could generally retain power as long as he remained healthy. The degree of leadership freedom varied, with Ceauşescu facing little debate, while Bulgaria's Todor Zhivkov could undertake actions such as forcing Bulgarian names on ethnic Turks without even discussing the matter. The party over which the politburo held sway was not a mass party but, comporting with Leninist tradition, a smaller selective party of between three percent (e.g., Albania) and fourteen percent (e.g., Czechoslovakia) of the country's population who had accepted total obedience. For example, a Polish communist described faith in the Polish United Workers' Party as that it "means that his faith in it is uncritical at every stage, no matter what the party is saying. It is a person with the ability to adapt his mentality and his conscience in such a way that he can unreservedly accept the dogma that the party is never wrong, even though it is wrong all the time." Entry usually required a period of probation. Those who secured membership in this selective party received considerable rewards, such as access to special lower priced shops with a greater selection of goods, special schools, holiday facilities, cinemas, homes, furniture, works of art, and official cars with special license plates so that police and others could identify these members from a distance. These members, also called nomenklatura, also obtained permission to travel abroad, which was rarely given to the general public. Envelopes containing banknotes, and sometimes foreign hard currency, were not infrequently passed out to certain party or politburo members. After the confiscation through nationalizations from prior owners following Soviet occupation, the party at first possessed considerable additional property and real estate to give members. All members possessed a party card or book in which were recorded attendance at meetings, service to the party, and any deviation from party conduct. Periodically, these cards would be inspected, frequently as a prelude to a culling or purge of those considered undesirable or insufficiently committed.

The Communist Party was at the center of the political system in the Eastern Bloc, with its leading role being absolute political rule with virtually no political discussion. Most of the parties in non-Soviet Eastern Bloc countries differed from the Communist Party of the Soviet Union in that they were technically coalitions. Only in Bulgaria, Czechoslovakia, Yugoslavia and Romania (and only after 1965) did the parties use the word "communist" in their name. The ruling parties in the Eastern Bloc included:

Ruling communist parties in the Eastern Bloc

Party	Country	Notes
Communist Party of the Soviet Union	Soviet Union	Precursor led the Russian Revolution; General Secretaries included Joseph Stalin (1922–1953), Nikita Khrushchev (1953–1964) and Leonid Brezhnev (1964–1982)
Socialist Unity Party of Germany	German Democratic Republic (East Germany)	General Secretaries included Walter Ulbricht (1950–1971) and Erich Honecker (1971–1989)
Party of Labour of Albania	People's Socialist Republic of Albania	Enver Hoxha was First Secretary from 1944 to 1985
Romanian Communist Party	Socialist Republic of Romania	From 1922 to 1944, none of its General Secretaries were Romanian; later, they included Gheorghe Gheorghiu-Dej (1945–1954, 1955–1965) and Nicolae Ceauşescu (1965–1989)
Hungarian Working People's Party	Hungarian People's Republic	After the Hungarian Revolution of 1956, called the Hungarian Socialist Workers' Party; General Secretaries included Mátyás Rákosi (1948–1956) and János Kádár (1956–1988)
Polish United Workers' Party	Polish People's Republic	General Secretaries included Bolesław Bierut (1948–1956), Władysław Gomułka (1956–1970), Edward Gierek (1970–1980), and Wojciech Jaruzelski (1981–1989)
Communist Party of Czechoslovakia	Czechoslovak Socialist Republic	Chairman was Klement Gottwald (1922–1953); First Secretaries included Antonín Novotný (1953–1968) and Gustáv Husák (1969–1987)
Bulgarian Communist Party	People's Republic of Bulgaria	First Secretaries included Vulko Chervenkov (1949–1954) and Todor Zhivkov (1954–1989)
League of Communists of Yugoslavia	Socialist Federal Republic of Yugoslavia	quietly ruled within the "Popular Front" until 1952; General Secretaries included Josip Broz Tito (1939–1980)

While, in some states, other parties were allowed to exist, frequently their only substantial function was to legitimize the existence of a national front or some similar umbrella organization. The organization of the party was based on the "territorial-production" principle, meaning that the lowest level unit could be based either in an area or in a place of work. The next highest level was territorial, into districts, towns, regions and states. Each level had its own committees, bureau and secretariat.

=== Purges and show trials ===
In accordance with Soviet directives, "building communism" in the Eastern Bloc included liquidation of class enemies and constant vigilance against counterrevolutionaries, especially within the Communist parties themselves. In the late 1940s and early 1950s, more frequently after the campaign to route out "Titoists" after the 1948 Tito–Stalin split, protests occurred, with many of those taking part being workers, intellectuals, dissatisfied young men inducted into the peasantry as part of collectivizations and those who were originally most enthusiastic about Communist systems. In response, in Poland, the central committee held a "vigilance plenum" against nationalists. One of the methods of control involved several party purges between 1948 and 1953, including 90,000 purged in Bulgaria, 200,000 in Romania (about one third of party), 200,000 in Hungary, 300,000 in East Germany, 370,000 in Poland (about one quarter of party members) and 550,000 in Czechoslovakia (30% of the party). In Hungary, approximately 150,000 were also imprisoned, with 2,000 summarily executed. In the Estonian SSR, a purge of "bourgeois nationalists" from the Estonian Communist party occurred from 1949 to 1951. In Czechoslovakia, approximately 130,000 people were sent to prisons, labor camps and mines. The evolution of the resulting harshness of purges in Czechoslovakia, like much of its history after 1948, was a function of the late takeover by the communists, with many of the purges focusing on the sizable numbers of party members with prior memberships in other parties. Party leader Klement Gottwald's early claims that Czechoslovakia was different from the rest of the Eastern Bloc created jealousy and additional danger later when Stalin was showing an almost paranoiac desire for unity and uniformity.

Nine copies of reports, confessions and other documents in all countries' purges were circulated to Soviet and other Eastern Bloc leaders. In Poland, when the local leadership resisted Soviet pressure for show trials, the Soviets demanded the construction of more prisons, including one containing a special wing for high-ranking party members. The intensity of the purges varied by country, with thorough purges in places with a relatively popular party in Czechoslovakia and Bulgaria, and less thorough purges in places where the party was initially less well-established, such as Poland, Romania and East Germany.

Any member with a western connection was immediately vulnerable, which included large numbers of people who had spent years in exile in the West during the Nazi-occupation of Czechoslovakia and Hungary. Many veterans of the Spanish Civil War were imprisoned or killed because they were tainted by their western experiences. Persons with western wives also were the targets of persecution. In addition to connections with Tito or Yugoslavia, persons who had previously belonged to non-communist parties merged in the Bloc politics process were also at risk, as were members from a non-working-class background.

In addition to rank-and-file member purges, prominent communists were purged, with some subjected to public show trials. These were more likely to be instigated, and sometimes orchestrated, by the Kremlin or even Stalin, as he had done in the Moscow Trials of the Great Purge in the Soviet Union in the 1930s. They included Koçi Xoxe in Albania and Traicho Kostov in Bulgaria, who were both purged and arrested. After Kostov was executed, Bulgarian leaders sent Stalin a telegram thanking him for the help. In Romania, Lucreţiu Pătrăşcanu, Ana Pauker and Vasile Luca were arrested, with Pătrăşcanu being executed. Stalin's NKVD emissary coordinated with Hungarian General Secretary Mátyás Rákosi and his ÁVH head the way the show trial of Hungarian Foreign Minister László Rajk, who was later executed. The Rajk trials led Moscow to warn Czechoslovakia's parties that enemy agents had penetrated high into party ranks, and when a puzzled Rudolf Slánský and Klement Gottwald inquired what they could do, Stalin's NKVD agents arrived to help prepare subsequent trials. The Czechoslovak party subsequently arrested Slánský himself, Vladimír Clementis, Ladislav Novomeský and Gustáv Husák (Clementis was later executed). Slánský and eleven others were convicted together of being "Trotskyist-zionist-titoist-bourgeois-nationalist traitors" in one series of show trials, after which they were executed and their ashes were mixed with material being used to fill roads on the outskirts of Prague. By the time of the Slánský trials, the Kremlin had been arguing that Israel, like Yugoslavia, had bitten the Soviet hand that had fed it, and thus the trials took an overtly antisemitic tone, with eleven of the fourteen defendants tried with Slánský being Jewish.

The Soviets directed show trial methods, including a procedure in which confessions and "evidence" from leading witnesses could be extracted by any means, including threatening to torture the witnesses’ wives and children. The higher ranking the party member, generally the more harsh the torture that was inflicted upon him. For the show trial of Hungarian Interior Minister János Kádár, who one year earlier attempted to force a confession of László Rajk in his show trial, regarding "Vladimir" the questioner of Kádár:

Vladimir had but one argument: blows. They had begun to beat Kádár. They had smeared his body with mercury to prevent his pores from breathing. He had been writhing on the floor when a newcomer had arrived. The newcomer was Vladimir's father, Mihály Farkas. Kádár was raised from the ground. Vladimir stepped close. Two henchmen pried Kádár's teeth apart, and the colonel, negligently, as if this were the most natural thing in the world, urinated into his mouth.

After this trial, Kádár later rose to General Secretary of the ruling Hungarian Working People's Party when Imre Nagy was executed. Once in the interrogation room, the inquisitors made no pretense about attempting to seek real evidence, making it clear that their only task was to extract a confession that would be used to convince other people of the defendant's guilt. Many dedicated party members accepted the argument that they could perform one last service to the party by allowing themselves to be convicted of crimes that they had not committed. Even after the party reneged on a deal that was supposed to have spared László Rajk, Rajk allegedly yelled just before his execution "long live the party!" For those not executed, degradation and humiliation continued for years in prison or labor camps.

The evidence was often not just non-existent but absurd, with Hungarian George Paloczi-Horváth's party interrogators delightedly exclaiming "We knew all the time—we have it here in writing—that you met professor Szentgyörgyi not in Istanbul, but in Constantinople." In another case, the Hungarian ÁVH secret police also condemned another party member as a Nazi accomplice with a document that had actually been previously displayed in glass cabinet of the Institute of the Working Class Movement as an example of a Gestapo forgery. The trials themselves were "shows", with each participant having to learn a script and conduct repeated rehearsals before the performance. In the Slánský trial, when the judge skipped one of the scripted questions, the better-rehearsed Slánský answered the one which should have been asked.

Some of the notable show trials in the Eastern Bloc after 1944

Member	Party	Notes
László Rajk	Hungarian Working People's Party	Hungarian Foreign Minister; orchestrated by Mátyás Rákosi, Joseph Stalin and János Kádár; tried with seven others; executed with two others
János Kádár	Hungarian Working People's Party	Beaten, mercury poured on skin, and mouth urinated in; eventually became General Secretary
Rudolf Slánský	Communist Party of Czechoslovakia	General Secretary who was tried in the Slánský trial with fourteen other mostly Jewish defendants; eleven executed; roads paved with ashes
Vladimír Clementis	Communist Party of Czechoslovakia	Minister of Foreign Affairs; hanged; erased from photograph with Klement Gottwald
Rudolf Margolius	Communist Party of Czechoslovakia	Deputy Minister of Foreign Trade; executed
Bedřich Reicin	Communist Party of Czechoslovakia	Deputy Minister of National Defense; hanged with ten others
Otto Šling	Communist Party of Czechoslovakia	Regional Party Secretary; executed; wife imprisoned during trial
Milada Horáková	Communist Party of Czechoslovakia	Highest organ of state power member; show trial of Horáková and 12 others broadcast on radio; hanged
Artur London	Communist Party of Czechoslovakia	Deputy Minister of Foreign Affairs; sentenced to life in prison
Solomon Lozovsky	Communist Party of the Soviet Union	Chairman of Sovinformburo; tried in antisemitic Doctors' Plot; executed with thirteen other Jewish Anti-Fascist Committee members
Solomon Bregman	Communist Party of the Soviet Union	Deputy minister of State Control; tried in antisemitic Doctors' Plot; died in jail purportedly of heart disease after severe beatings
Aaron Katz	Communist Party of the Soviet Union	General of the Stalin Military Academy; tried in antisemitic Doctors' Plot; after beatings, he was released following Stalin's death
Traicho Kostov	Bulgarian Communist Party	President of Council of Ministers; tried with ten others; executed
Koçi Xoxe	Party of Labour of Albania	Defense and Interior Minister; forced to admit conspired with Josip Broz Tito; hanged
Lucreţiu Pătrăşcanu	Romanian Workers Party	Central Committee member; possible Securitate torture; one leg amputated before trial; executed
Ana Pauker	Romanian Workers Party	Foreign Minister; charged with "cosmopolitanism" (Pauker was Jewish); released after Stalin's death; purged after later trial on other matters
Teohari Georgescu	Romanian Workers Party	Interior Minister; wife and two children also arrested; admitted guilt, but released
Vasile Luca	Romanian Workers Party	Minister of Finance; sentenced to death, but sentence commuted to life imprisonment and hard labour; died nine years into term

=== Administrative structures ===
Initially, communist parties were small in all countries except Czechoslovakia, such that there existed an acute shortage of politically "trustworthy" persons for administration, police and other professions. Accordingly, "politically unreliable" non-communists initially filled such roles. Those not obedient to communist authorities were ousted, while Moscow cadres started a large-scale party programs to train personnel who would meet political requirements.

In addition, throughout the Eastern Bloc, armies appeared in Soviet-style uniforms studying military manuals copied from the Red Army. The party dominated the armed forces, with party members comprising almost every rank above captain.

Two lists were often kept by the party structure: the cadre and the nomenklatura lists. The latter contained every post in each country that was important to the smooth application of party policy, including military posts, administrative positions, directors of local enterprises, social organization administrators, newspapers, etc. In Czechoslovakia, the nomenklatura lists were thought to contain 100,000 post listings, while the number estimated in Poland was 2-3 times that figure. The names of those that the party considered to be trustworthy enough to secure a nomenklatura post were compiled on the cadre list. One did not have to be a party member to be on the cadre list, but any sign of unconventional behavior would mean exclusion from the list. The considerable amount of information disseminated to the party from police or trusted observers ensured that the cadre lists were timely and comprehensive. The result was that anyone aspiring to have an influential or rewarding job had to conform to party dictates.

=== De-Stalinization ===
Some relaxation of Soviet control occurred after Stalin's death in 1953 and the subsequent de-stalinization. State brutality and repression waned in the Bloc. The Red Army withdrew from the Balkans, though not from East Germany and countries needed for transit purposes. Continuing maintenance of communist power was guaranteed by the Brezhnev Doctrine, such as in the 1968 Warsaw Pact invasion of Czechoslovakia, on the grounds that a threat to the system in one country was a challenge to the alliance as a whole.

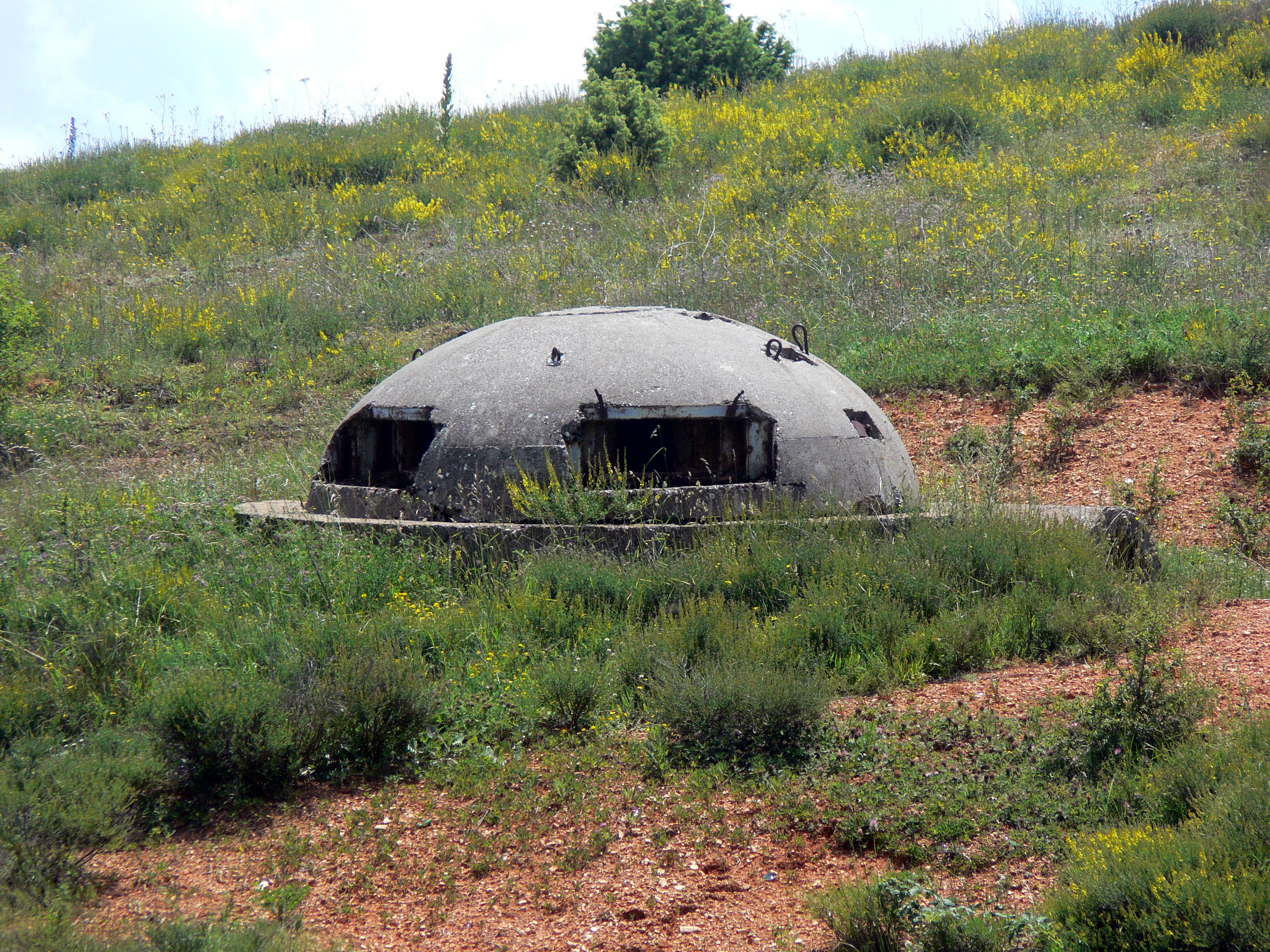
One of over 700,000 bunkers built by Enver Hoxha in Albania

As with Yugoslavia after the Tito–Stalin split, Albania took a different course than most of the rest of the Eastern Bloc. Because of Party of Labour of Albania First Secretary Enver Hoxha's adherence to Stalinism, Albania broke with the Soviet Union in 1960 following the Soviet de-stalinization. Albania began to establish closer contacts with Mao Zedong's China. Following Mao's death and China seeking close ties with the United States, Albania also severed ties with China in 1978.

The cult of personality intensified around Hoxha, who became increasingly paranoid about foreign intrigue and conspiracy. Hoxha tolerated no dissent and thousands of Albanians were executed, sent to state labor camps or exiled to remote areas for work. After a purge in the military and the economic bureaucracy, in 1976, Albania implemented a rigidly Marxist-Leninist constitution that not only made the party the leading force in state and society, but also limited private property and forbade foreign loans. Isolating itself completely from the rest of the world, Albania embarked on a massive defense program, including the amassing of a huge arsenal of weapons and the construction of more than 700,000 concrete military bunkers for a country with only 3 million citizens.

== Political repression ==
While the initial institution of communism destroyed most of the prior institutional and organizational diversity of the Eastern Bloc countries, communist structures existed in different manifestations of strength that also varied over time. In such Communist systems, centralized and unelected state apparatuses, command economies, and scarcity or absence of independent civil associations specifically combined to tightly restrict the repertoire of action for those looking to defend their interests or press demands on the government. These features did not evolve, but rather were intentionally imposed over a relatively short span of time.

As in the Soviet Union, culture was subordinated to political needs and creativity was secondary to socialist realism. The legal system and education were redesigned on Soviet lines. In addition to emigration restrictions, civil society, defined as a domain of political action outside the party's state control, was not allowed to firmly take root, with the possible exception of Poland in the 1980s. While the institutional designs of the communist systems were based on the rejection of rule of law, the legal infrastructure was not immune to change reflecting decaying ideology and the substitution of autonomous law.

While institutional changes creating some freedoms occurred, a change toward effective constitutionalism could not occur without the collapse of the communist political regimes. Market-oriented reforms could not work without functioning markets. Such systems' subordination of society was not so much the result of recurrent state triumphs over rival groups as it was intermittent state triumphs combined with state-imposed structures that broke requisite links and occupied the social space necessary for rival groups to initially form.

=== Political dissent ===
Communist regimes in the Eastern Bloc viewed even marginal groups of opposition intellectuals as a potential threat because of the bases underlying Communist power therein. The central pillar on which the monopoly power of the Communist elite was based was the belief of the administrative classes—mid-level leadership cadres in the party apparatus, industry, security organs, education and state administration—in the legitimacy of the Communist Party. The perceived danger posed by dissidence and opposition was less that of the possible mobilization of broad open protest movements undermining a regime than that political nonconformism would undermine the reliability of the administrative classes responsible for carrying the party leadership's directives.

Accordingly, the suppression of dissidence and opposition was viewed as a central prerequisite for the security of Communist power, though the enormous expense at which the population in certain countries were kept under secret surveillance may not have been rational. The degree of opposition and dissident suppression varied by country and time throughout the Eastern Bloc. Following a totalitarian initial phase, a post-totalitarian period followed the death of Stalin in which the primary method of Communist rule shifted from wide scale terror to selective repression and ideological and sociopolitical strategies of legitimation and the securing of loyalty.

Post-totalitarian phase repression varied across Eastern Bloc countries according to the degree of internal coherence and the social anchoring of the Communist elites in each country. Trial by jury was replaced by a tribunal of a professional judge and two lay assessors that were dependable party actors. The features of such Communist systems combined to structure the social and political environment to raise the cost of open protest, often to a prohibitive level. While resistance existed, it occurred mainly in the form of individual measures predicated on acceptance of the system as a whole that paradoxically often further atrophied the avenues of collective redress against the state, such as workers intentionally wasting time on the job or stealing state resources.

=== Class categories ===
Citizens were classified by socialist origin and class, with the standard categories being: worker, peasant, intelligentsia, petty employee, others and class enemies. In order to gain a more obedient future intelligentsia, the children of class enemies were restricted to no more than primary education, while those of the fourth and fifth categories would find it difficult to gain entrance into a university. Criminal codes could also be graded on a class basis, with the class origin of the convicted determining how dangerous to society the crime had been.

=== Broad social purges ===
In addition to party purges, more widespread social purges occurred, and were aimed with equal or greater intensity at all levels of society. As with the party purges, the social purges were justified theoretically by the Stalinist doctrine that the class struggle intensifies in the immediate aftermath of the socialist revolution and in the first stages of the construction of socialism. Consequently, bourgeois and petty-bourgeois attitudes arose leading, for example, to the reliance upon home production and the black market in the resulting shortage economies. When added to the perceived external dangers of the Cold War, and especially following the paranoia arising from the Tito–Stalin split, an emphasis was put on stopping the internal dangers of petty-bourgeois activities which might foment additional resistance and popular sympathy of the masses for the west.

These social purges constituted generalized episodes of terror intended to be seen as such in order to establish order and control. No person was safe from the purges' effects and denunciations were rife. The definitions of crime employed in such purges were broad and vague, including the possession of goods in short supply being construed as hoarding. It was the responsibility of all citizens to integrate into their daily lives the responsibility for administering the purges. A former Romanian Securitate leader stated:

This was achieved by a simple device: a factory, a local government department, a professional organization was given a quota of people to be weeded out, which might mean sacking, sending to the mines or handing over to the security police as class enemies under the accusation of whatever happened to be the fashionable crime. The steering committee of the organization, or the man responsible for personnel matters, knew that if they did not comply they would themselves be the victims. So they did comply, telling everybody that they saved ninety-eight good people by selecting two sacrificial lambs who were anyhow ‘not much good’, were spoiling things for everybody by working too hard, drinking too much or too little, were odd because they refused to sleep with the right person, or simply, and this was always a safe argument, were Jews.

In Budapest, Hungary, at 2:00 a.m. on Mondays, Wednesdays, and Fridays, vans transported purge targets, who by 1953, numbered approximately 700,000. Of those, 98,000 were branded as spies and saboteurs, 5,000 of which were executed. In Czechoslovakia between 1948 and 1954, approximately 150,000 targets were arrested. Similar proportions of the population suffered in other Eastern Bloc states.

=== Civil society groups ===
As with the party purges, any institution with western connections was particularly vulnerable. Eastern Bloc branches of organizations with western contacts, such as the boy scouts, the girl guides and the international federation of professional and business women, were closed. Churches were subjected to attack, including the Uniate church in the Ukraine and Romania, Protestants in Bulgaria and the Roman Catholic Church in Hungary. People that constituted former "class enemies" because of their social upbringing were at risk, as well as those with prior memberships in non-communist parties.

While the purges quelled outward manifestations of dissatisfaction, they also caused severe economic dislocations. Large construction projects were launched with insufficient capital such that unpaid prisoners were required to serve in place of modern equipment. Disruption of the trained administrative and management elites also caused harm. So many workers were dismissed from established professions that they had to be replaced by hastily trained younger workers that did not possess questionable class origins. A Czechoslovak noted:

The highly qualified professional people are laying roads, building bridges and operating machines, and the dumb clots—whose fathers used to dig, sweep or bricklay—are on top, telling the others where to lay the roads, what to produce and how to spend the country's money. The consequence is the roads look like plowed fields, we make things we can’t sell and the bridges can’t be used for traffic…. Then they wonder why the economy is going downhill like a ten-ton lorry with the brakes off.

The purges often coincided with the introduction of the first Five Year Plans in the non-Soviet members of the Eastern Bloc. The objectives of those plans were considered beyond political rapproche even where they were absurd, such that workers that did not fulfill targets were targeted and blamed for economic woes, while at the same time, the ultimate responsibility for the economic shortcomings would be placed on prominent victims of the political purge. In Romania, Gheorghiu-Dej admitted that 80,000 peasants had been accused of siding with the class enemy because they resisted collectivization, while purged party elite Ana Pauker was blamed for this "distortion".

In addition, sizable resources were employed in the purge, such as in Hungary, where almost one million adults were employed to record, control, indoctrinate, spy on and sometimes kill targets of the purge. Unlike the repressions under Nazi occupation, no ongoing war existed that could bring an end to the tribulations of the Eastern Bloc, and morale severely suffered as a consequence. Because the party later had to admit the mistakes of much that occurred during the purges after Stalin's death, the purges also destroyed the moral base upon which the party operated. In doing so, the party abrogated its prior Leninist claim to moral infallibility for the working class.

== Secret police ==
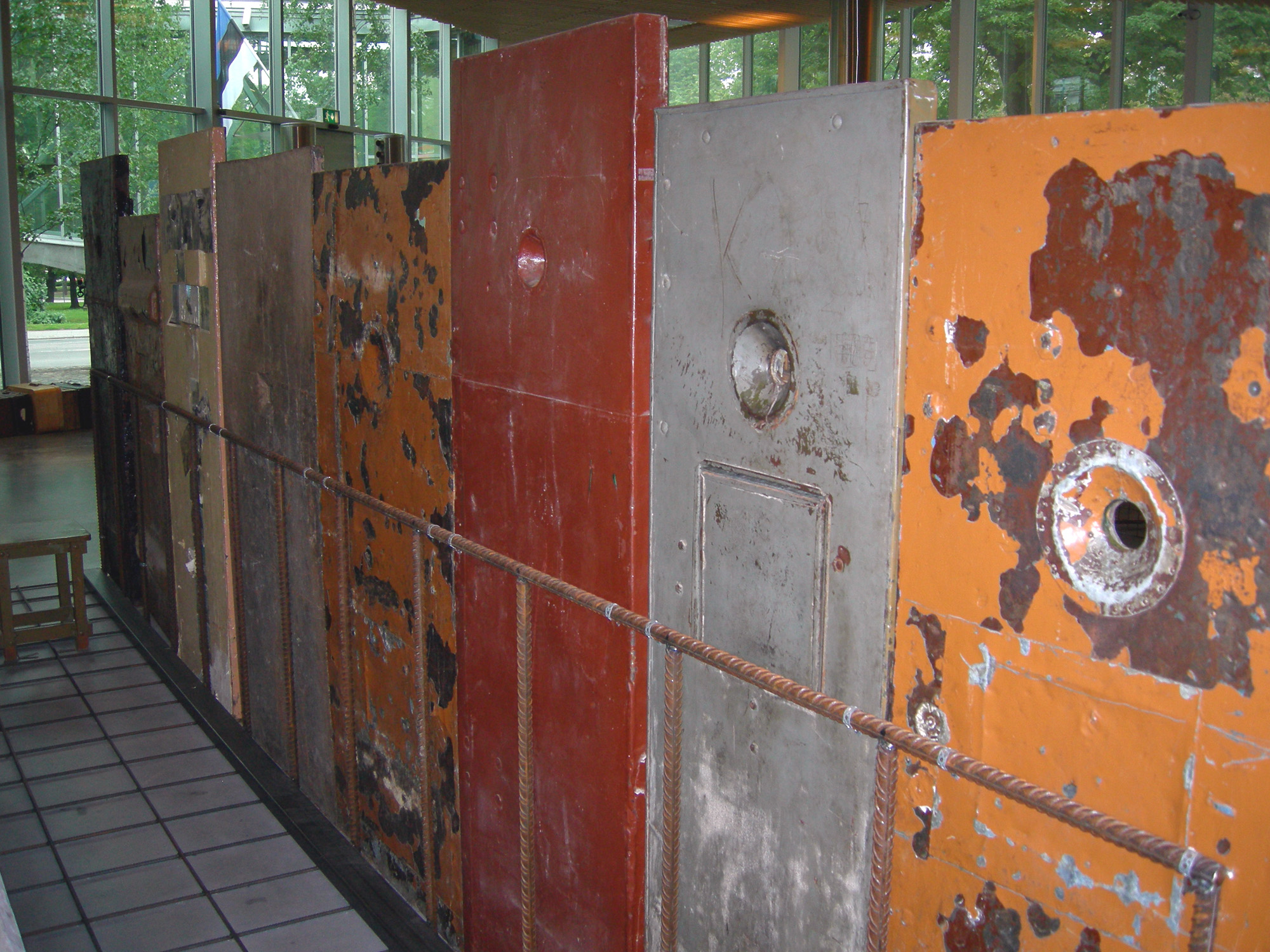
KGB prison doors on display in the Museum of Occupations, Tallinn, Estonia.

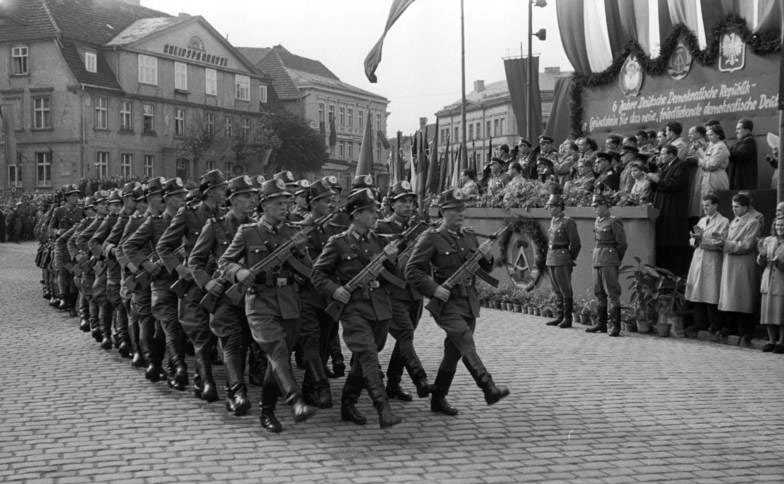
Officers of the East German Volkspolizei parading through the streets of Neustrelitz in 1955. They are armed with StG 44 rifles.

Eastern Bloc secret police organizations were formed on Vladimir Lenin's theory and Joseph Stalin's practical application of "the defense of the revolution." One of the first acts of Lenin after the October 1917 Revolution was the establishment of a secret police, the Cheka. Such organizations in the Eastern Bloc became the "shield and sword" of the ruling Communist party. The party's claim was based on Lenin's general theory of class struggle, imperialism, legitimate socialism, and the dictatorship of the proletariat.

The police served to deter opposition to party directives, and contain it should it appear. The political police were the core of the system. Large numbers of citizens were recruited, sometimes through blackmail, to become informers for the secret police. Sophisticated police networks monitored all strata of society while persecuting only those who overtly expressed dissatisfaction or disagreement with the regime. The names of each political police organization became synonymous with unbridled power and threats of violent retribution should an individual become active against the collective. After Stalin's death in 1953, in general, the profile of the secret police declined, and became less a means to instill terror than to preserve the existing distribution of political power, overall becoming more reactive than proactive. The exceptions to this lower profile were in Albania under Enver Hoxha and in Romania under Nicolae Ceauşescu. The linchpin of Soviet control early in the Eastern Bloc was General Ivan Serov, who was appointed to chairman of the new Soviet KGB in 1954 as a reward for having effectively applied his secret police expertise to the sovietization of the Eastern Bloc.

=== KGB and the formation of the Stasi ===
During party purges, the secret police became so entrenched within the party that they became their own elite within the elite of the party. State police organizations were vast. The East German Stasi became the Soviet KGB's most important surrogate following Lenin's statement that "the principal link in the chain of revolution is the German link, and the success of world revolution depends more on Germany than upon any other country." In 1947, Stalin told Edvard Kardelj, then prime minister of Yugoslavia, "We Russians will never get out of Germany." The NKVD at first maintained a number of former Nazi concentration camps, such as Buchenwald and Sachsenhausen, to house former Nazis. After the forced merger of the Socialist Unity Party of Germany thousands of anti-Nazi social democrats and communists that opposed the merger also ended up in those camps. Erich Mielke, a key operator for the Soviets after the war, built the Stasi into a vast secret police and espionage organization. Mielke became the longest-serving state security chief in the Eastern bloc, and his relationship with the Soviet secret police dated back to 1931, when he had fled Germany for Moscow after murdering two Berlin policemen. Although Mielke's Stasi was superficially granted independence in 1957, until 1990 the KGB continued to maintain liaison officers in all eight main Stasi directorates, each with his own office inside the Stasi's Berlin compound, and in each of the fifteen Stasi district headquarters around East Germany. Collaboration was so close that the KGB invited the Stasi to establish operational bases in Moscow and Leningrad to monitor visiting East German tourists and Mielke referred to the Stasi officers as "Chekists of the Soviet Union." In 1978, Mielke formally granted KGB officers in East Germany the same rights and powers they enjoyed in the Soviet Union.

All information acquired worldwide by the intelligence and security services in the Eastern bloc was stored in the Soviet computer SOUD (System of Joint Acquisition of Enemy Data). The SOUD became a valuable KGB asset for the Stasi. Stasi engineers had actually created the system using stolen and illegally obtained Western technology, but the Soviets insisted that it be based in Moscow.

=== Stasi operations ===
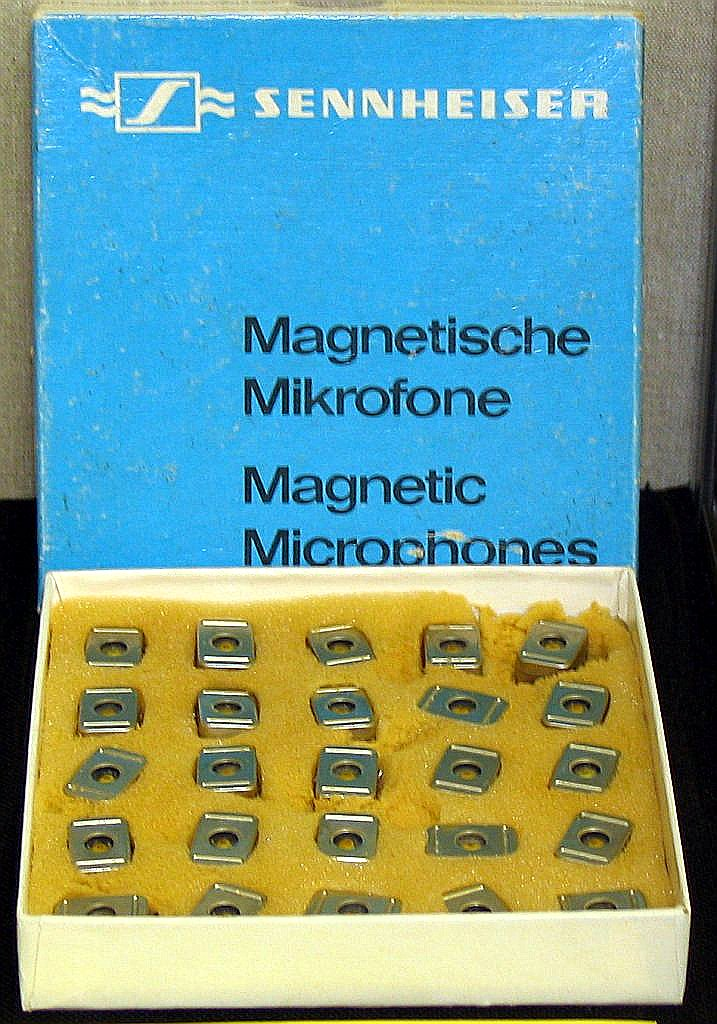
Stasi construction bugs employed in new buildings

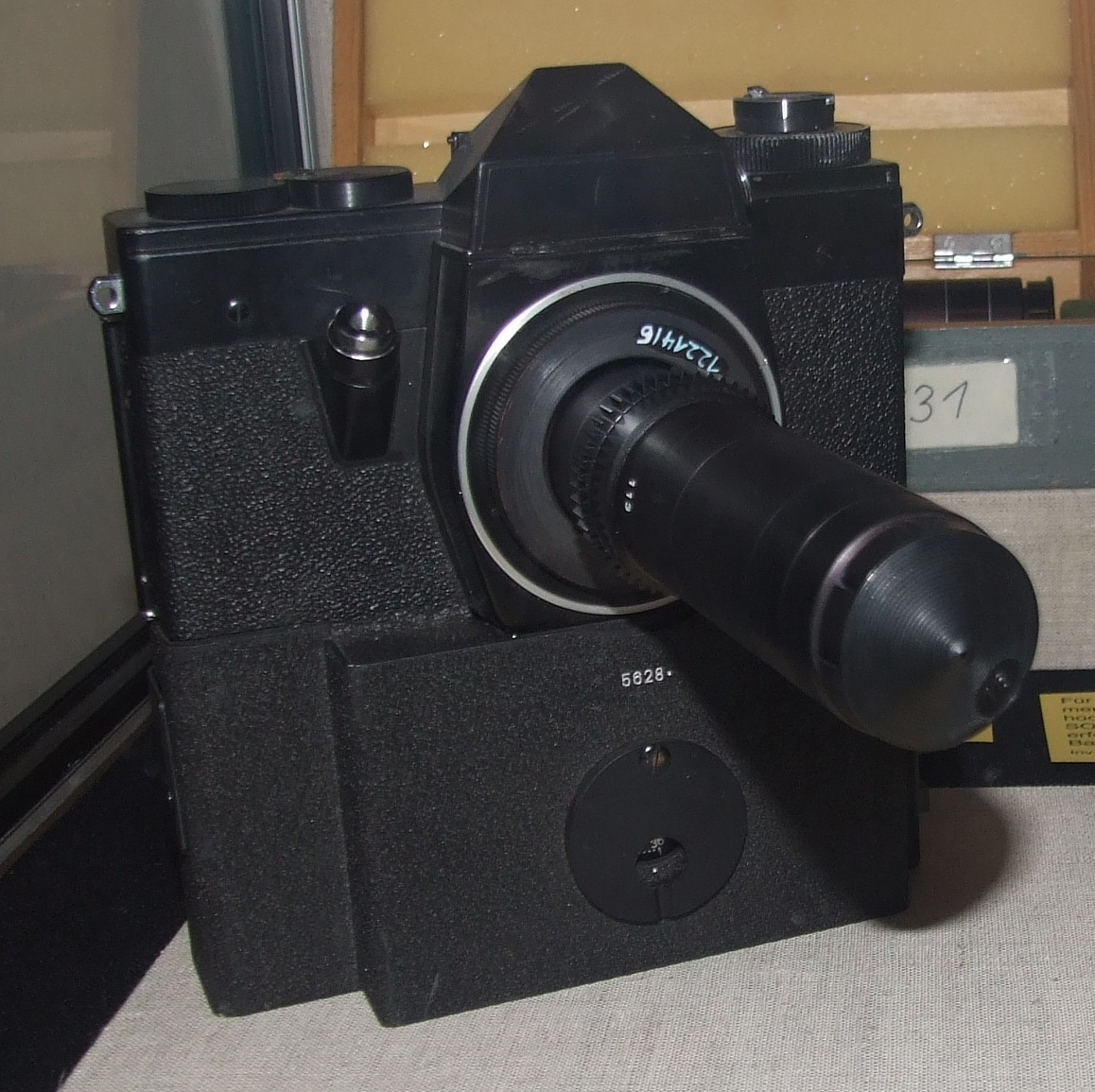
Stasi quiet camera that could take pictures through a 1mm hole in a wall

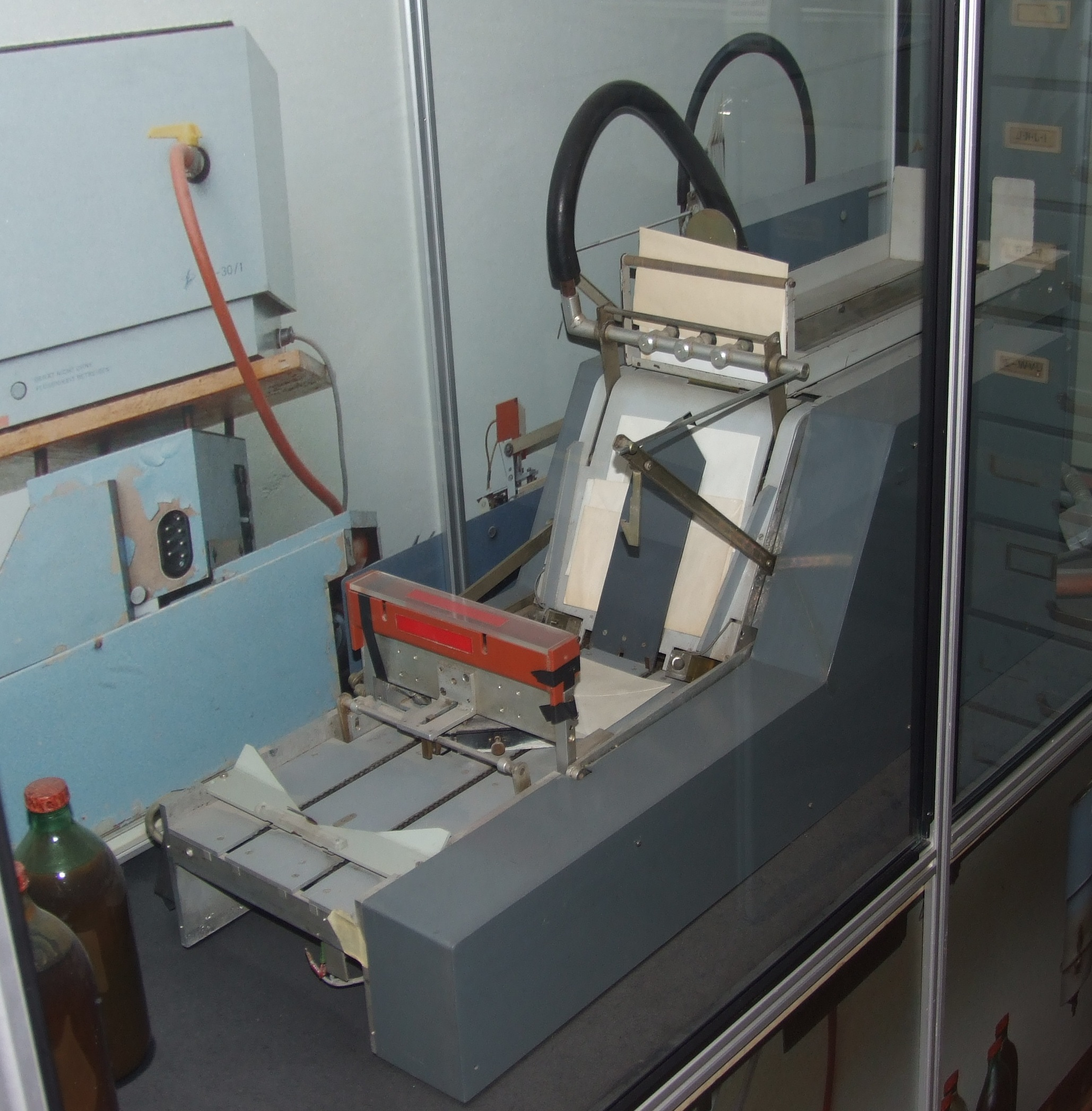
Stasi automated machine to reglue envelopes after mail had been opened for examination

The Stasi employed 120,000 full-time agents and an official estimate of 100,000 informants to monitor a country that possessed only 16 million inhabitants. Between 1950 and 1989, the Stasi employed a total of 274,000 persons. In terms of total inoffizielle Mitarbeiter (IMs) Stasi informants, by 1995, 174,000 had been identified, which approximated 2.5% of East Germany's population between the ages of 18 and 60. While these calculations were from official records, because many such records were destroyed, there were likely closer to 500,000 Stasi informers. A former Stasi colonel estimated that the figure could be as high as 2 million if occasional informants were included.

The result was a society in which residents often did not know whom to trust, and in which few attempted to share their private thoughts with anyone but close friends or colleagues. A popular saying in East Germany was that whenever three people engaged in a conversation, one was bound to be a Stasi informant. Stasi efforts with one agent per 166 citizens dwarfed, for example, the Nazi Gestapo, which employed only 40,000 officials to watch a population of 80 million (one officer per 2,000 citizens) and the Soviet KGB, which employed 480,000 full-time agents to oversee a nation of 280 million residents (one agent per 583 citizens). When informants were included, the Stasi had one spy per 66 citizens of East Germany. When part-time informer adults were included, the figures reached approximately one spy per 6.5 citizens.

Full-time officers were posted to all major industrial plants and one tenant in every apartment building was designated as a watchdog reporting to an area representative of the Volkspolizei (Vopo). Spies reported every relative or friend that stayed the night at another's apartment. Tiny holes were bored in apartment and hotel room walls through which Stasi agents filmed citizens with special video cameras. Similarly, schools, universities, and hospitals were extensively infiltrated.

Political offenses usually came under broad crimes such as "Treasonable Relaying of Information", "Treasonable Agent Activity" and "Interference in Activities of the State or Society." Defendants usually were persons who had requested (nominally) legal exit permits from East Germany or contacted a Western consulate to inquire about emigration procedures. Sentences of up to two and a half years' hard labor were not unusual as punishment for such inquiries. Those accused of "propaganda hostile to the state" could be those that once stated that it was not necessary to station tanks at the border, referred to border fortifications as "nonsense" or received West German television programs and relayed the contents to others. Writing to friends in the west about wishes to emigrate, which the Stasi could intercept, could draw a conviction for "establishing illegal contacts." In addition, it was a crime to fail to denounce fellow citizens, such as informers who failed to report friends stating they wished to escape to the west. After the mid-1950s, Stasi executions were carried out in strict secrecy, usually by guillotine and, in later years, by a single pistol shot to the neck. In most instances, the relatives of the executed were not informed of either the sentence or the execution. The corpses were cremated and the ashes buried secretly, sometimes at construction sites. The Stasi also focused upon the allies of the ruling communist Socialist Unity Party of Germany. For example, during the Soviet-backed forced merger of the SED, the Stasi arrested 5,000 Social Democratic Party of Germany members that disapproved of the merger. 400 died from a mix of executions, malnutrition or disappearing. 200 of them were later sentenced to a total of 10,000 years jail time. Until 1950, all such sentences were pronounced by Soviet military tribunals in trials that lasted no more than ten minutes each.

While the Stasi had only 4,000 members in 1953, it grew considerably over the years to 52,707 in 1973. Its ranks swelled much more quickly after Eastern Bloc countries signed the 1975 Helsinki accords, which Erich Honecker viewed as a grave threat to his regime because they contained language binding signatories to respect "human and basic rights, including freedom of thought, conscience, religion, and conviction. Stasi size was immediately increased by 10,000. Mielke was accorded new, wide-ranging powers while the Stasi became the leadership's instrument of power to an extent not seen in the Eastern Bloc since Stalin's death, with the exception of the Securitate in Romania under Nicolae Ceaușescu. The Stasi then set up 24 internment camps throughout East Germany to house six categories of persons to be arrested.

Mielke then issued Richtlinie 1/76, a standard operating procedure manual outlining surveillance of the population down to the last detail. Stasi Division M employed officers at every post office to surreptitiously open all letters and parcels sent to, or received from, a non-communist country. Writing samples were taken from letters that could be used to match with writing on any dissident pamphlets. Those questioned by the Stasi were forced to put special cloths under the arms that were later stored in sealed and numbered cans in a massive warehouse for later use by bloodhounds in the event of a manhunt. The Stasi also sprayed a special chemical on sidewalks in front of their offices that would adhere to the shoes of those leaving and permit dogs more easily to track them. In the late 1970s, when certain western news organizations were allowed to employ offices in East Berlin, they were required to hire all employees from a specified labour pool, all of whom were Stasi informants.

=== State police organizations ===
Under Nicolae Ceauşescu, the powers of the Securitate secret police increased to become, in proportion to Romania's population, one of the largest and most brutal secret police forces in the Eastern bloc. By 1989, total Securitate personnel officers and security troops totalled 38,682 for a population of 23 million. The Securitate employed nearly a half-million informers. Following several leaders of a miner strike later dying of premature disease, it was later discovered that Securitate doctors had subjected them to five-minute-long chest X-rays in an attempt to develop cancer. After birth rates fell, Securitate agents were placed in all gynecological wards while regular pregnancy tests were mandated for women of child-bearing age in Romania, with severe penalties for anyone who was found to have terminated a pregnancy. The Securitate also arrested 80,000 peasants who opposed labor reforms in 1949.

Albania's Sigurimi, under the leadership of isolationist Stalinist Enver Hoxha, were as brutal as the Securitate. From the beginning, the ÁVH (first known as the ÁVO) acted as the private army of the ruling Hungarian Working People's Party. Preceding the Hungarian Revolution of 1956, the ÁVH, which fired on protesters, was opposed by the Hungarian army and abolished for a brief period during the revolution until the Red Army's invasion of Hungary thereafter. In Bulgaria, the Sigurnost grew throughout the 1970s and became even more subservient to the KGB as leader Todor Zhivkov declared that Bulgaria and the Soviet Union would "act as a single body, breathing with the same lungs and nourished by the same blood stream", and attempted to incorporate Bulgaria in the Soviet Union. The UDBa in Yugoslavia operated with more restraint than secret police agencies in the communist states of Eastern Europe. In its latter decades it was composed of eight semi-independent secret police organizations—one for each of the six Yugoslav federal republics and two for the autonomous provinces—coordinated by the central federal headquarters in the capital of Belgrade.

In Poland, the Urząd Bezpieczeństwa ("Security Office", or UB) was initially formed to wage a covert war against communists in Poland. The UB was modelled on the Soviet NKVD, whose specialists had helped forge the new "shield of the state." NKVD chief Ivan Serov had begun training Polish NKVD recruits as early as 1940, when the Soviets initially invaded eastern Poland, including training in the Soviet Union. By 1945, the UB, under NKVD control, had agents in every branch of the Polish government.

Several state police and secret police organizations enforced communist party rule, including:

Notable Police organizations in the Eastern Bloc

Organization	Type	Country	Notes
Stasi	secret police	East Germany	established in 1950; allegedly assassinated East German football player Lutz Eigendorf and the Swedish journalist Cats Falck
Volkspolizei	People's Police	East Germany	Helped erect the Berlin Wall; used in the uprising of 1953 in East Germany
KdA	Paramilitary	East Germany	Paramilitary organization founded in 1954 that numbered up to 400,000
Grepo	Border police	East Germany	Guarded the Berlin Wall and Inner German border
Transportpolizei	Transport police	East Germany	Guarded all methods of transportation
NKVD	Police	Soviet Union	Both public and secret police involved with: Katyn massacre, Great Purge, Gestapo-NKVD Conferences, Vinnytsia massacre, NKVD prisoner massacres, Holodomor, etc.
KGB	Secret police	Soviet Union	Established in 1954; played an instrumental role in the crushing of the Hungarian Revolution of 1956 and the 1968 Prague Spring
StB	Secret police	Czechoslovak Socialist Republic	Used forcing confessions by means of torture, including the use of drugs, blackmail and kidnapping.
Lidové milice	Paramilitary	Czechoslovak Socialist Republic	Militia organisation of Communist Party of Czechoslovakia from 1948 to 1989
Komitet za darzhavna sigurnost (KDS)	secret police	People's Republic of Bulgaria	Best known for writer Georgi Markov's murder in London in 1978 known for the "Bulgarian umbrella" that was used.
Sigurimi	secret police	People's Republic of Albania	Instrumental in the regime of Enver Hoxha
ÁVH	secret police	People's Republic of Hungary	Extorted confessions instrumental in show trials surrounding Raoul Wallenberg; arrested László Rajk (later executed); political prisoners were kept in ÁVH-run concentration camps
Workers' Militia	special police	People's Republic of Hungary	Created after the Hungarian Revolution of 1956
Securitate	secret police	Socialist Republic of Romania	Created with the help of NKVD and SMERSH, it was instrumental in supporting dictator Nicolae Ceauşescu
Patriotic Guards (Romania)	party militia	Socialist Republic of Romania	Created in 1968
UB	secret police	Polish People's Republic	Operated from 1945 to 1954; killed notables, such as: Hieronim Dekutowski, Emil August Fieldorf, Boleslaw Kontrym, Witold Pilecki, Jan Rodowicz and Zygmunt Szendzielarz.
SB	secret police	Polish People's Republic	Replaced the UB in 1956
Milicja Obywatelska	party militia	Polish People's Republic	PKWN-run; replaced police in 1944
ZOMO	Paramilitary	Polish People's Republic	Known for brutal and sometimes lethal actions of quelling civil rights protests and riot control, including the 1968 Polish political crisis, the Martial law in Poland, and the Polish 1970 protests
UDBa	secret police	Socialist Federal Republic of Yugoslavia	founded in 1946; assassinated several overseas enemies of the states, including: Ivo Protulipac, newspaper columnist Nahid Kulenović, Vjekoslav Luburić, Bruno Bušić and Stjepan Đureković.
OZNA	security agency	Socialist Federal Republic of Yugoslavia	founded in 1944

=== The secret police and Eastern Bloc dissolution ===
The Stasi acted as a proxy for KGB conduct activities in Poland, where the Soviets were not well liked. When the Polish Solidarity movement arose, Stasi-KGB data was immediately handed to the Polish SB which immediately arrested hundred of Solidarity members within a few hours of declaring martial law, as demanded by the Soviets. All telephone, telegraph and mail traffic in and out of Poland was put under Stasi control, while a massive Stasi Tenth Department of the Second Main Directorate (counterintelligence) was created to monitor Poland. With worries throughout the Eastern Bloc of a possible collapse if communism fell in any country, the Stasi Tenth Department dispatched operational groups to Czechoslovakia and Hungary. The Tenth Department, however, could not monitor the large number of discontented citizens in the Eastern Bloc in the late 1980s, with the first significant breach coming Hungary when the government therein ordered the dismantling of fortifications and barbed wire barriers along its border with Austria in August 1989. Word spread rapidly to East Germany, where thousands seeking freedom poured into Hungary. Hungary ignored Stasi threats regarding closure of the border. Thereafter, the battle was effectively lost, with East Germany beginning the dismantling of the Berlin Wall months later.

Before German unification, the last East German government ordered the burning of thousands of Stasi computer records to attempt to protect against later prosecution. In addition, they shredded thousands of espionage files and placed the remains in 172,000 paper sacks. Examination of what remains of the vast Stasi files is difficult because of their enormous size. In the first three years after the October 3, 1990 German reunification, large numbers of sensational arrests of Stasi infiltrators throughout the former West German government occurred weekly. It became clear that the entire West German government had been infested by the East German spy organization, as was every political party, West Germany's industry, banks, the church, and the news media. One female Stasi mole in the BND, an East German agent for seventeen years, had been entrusted with the job of preparing the daily secret intelligence summary for West German Chancellor Helmut Kohl. Stasi archivists estimate that at least 20,000 West Germans had spied for the Stasi and that that estimate may be conservative.After German reunification, the examination by former targets of their Stasi files led to countless civil suits being filed against informers, with large numbers of family and friend relationship destroyed.
