= Aaron Katz =

Aaron Katz may refer to:

- Aaron Katz (Soviet general) (1901–1971), Red Army major general and member of the Jewish Anti-Fascist Committee
- Aaron Katz (filmmaker) (born 1981), American independent filmmaker

== See also ==
- Aharon Katzir (1914–1972), Israeli pioneer in the study of the electrochemistry of biopolymers
