= Night of the Murdered Poets =

1952 execution of thirteen Soviet Jews

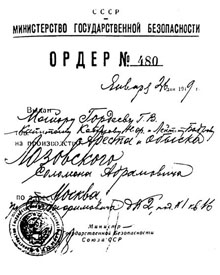
Order to arrest Lozovsky

The Night of the Murdered Poets (Note: Russian: Де́ло Евре́йского антифаши́стского комите́та, romanized: Delo Yevreyskovo antifashistskovo komiteta, lit. 'Case of the Jewish Anti-Fascist Committee'; Yiddish: הרוגי מלכות פֿונעם ראַטנפאַרבאַנד, romanized: Harugey malkhes funem Ratnfarband, lit. 'Soviet Union Martyrs') occurred on 12 August 1952, and it involved the execution of 13 Soviet Jews in the Lubyanka Prison in Moscow. Arrests were made in September 1948 and June 1949, with all defendants having been convicted of espionage and treason, as well as many other crimes. Following their arrests and detention, they were tortured, beaten, and isolated for three years before being formally charged. There were five Yiddish writers among these defendants, all of whom were part of the Jewish Anti-Fascist Committee.

== Jewish Anti-Fascist Committee ==
The threat of an attack on the Soviet Union by Nazi Germany catalyzed the start of the Jewish Anti-Fascist Committee (JAC), a committee reaching out to Jews worldwide to support the Soviet war effort against Nazi Germany. Solomon Mikhoels, a Yiddish actor and director, headed the committee. Other members of the committee were prominent Yiddish literary figures, actors, and doctors who wanted to help influence Jewish support for the Soviet Union through their writing and also using radio broadcasts from Russia to different countries. In 1943, Mikhoels and the vice-chairman of the Anti-Fascist Committee, Itzik Fefer, traveled to the U.S. and England to help raise money.

Once the German invasion began and Russian Jewish culture was destroyed by the invading Nazi forces' genocidal operations, the JAC felt it had a duty to change priorities, and focus on the rebuilding of Jewish communities, farms, culture, and identity – including a proposal to establish Jewish autonomy in Crimea. Not everyone agreed with the direction in which things were headed and many, such as Stalin and Mikhail Suslov, thought the JAC was "intervening in matters in which it should not interfere".

== Interrogation and indictment ==
The charges filed against the accused included mentions of "counterrevolutionary crimes" and organized action meant to "topple, undermine, or weaken the Soviet Union." Additionally, the inculpation revealed that the investigation uncovered evidence that the accused had used the JAC as a means for spying and promoting anti-government sentiment. The indictment went on to assert that the accused had been enemies of the government prior to their involvement with the JAC, and that the JAC served as their international network for communicating anti-Soviet views.

Overemphasis on exchanges of relatively innocuous information between the JAC leadership and Jews in other countries, particularly American journalists, augmented accusations of espionage. Another piece of evidence supporting the indictment was a letter that the leadership of the JAC wrote as a formal request for Crimea to become the new Jewish homeland.

All of the defendants endured incessant interrogations which, for everyone except Itzik Fefer, were coupled with beatings and torture. Eventually, these tactics led to forced, false confessions. One defendant, Joseph Yuzefovich, told the court at the trial, "I was ready to confess that I was the pope's own nephew and that I was acting on his direct personal orders" after a beating. Another defendant, Boris Shimeliovich, said he had counted over two thousand blows to his buttocks and heels, but he was the only member of the accused who refused to confess to any crimes.

== Victims ==
1. Peretz Markish (1895–1952), Yiddish poet, co-founder of the School of Writers, a Yiddish literary school in Soviet Russia
2. Dovid Hofshteyn (1889–1952), Yiddish poet
3. Itzik Feffer (1900–1952), Yiddish poet, an informer for the NKVD
4. Leib Kvitko (1890–1952), Yiddish poet and children's writer
5. David Bergelson (1884–1952), a distinguished novelist
6. Solomon Lozovsky (1878–1952), Director of Soviet Information Bureau, Deputy Commissar of Foreign Affairs, vigorously denounced accusations against himself and others
7. Boris Shimeliovich (1892–1952), medical director of the Botkin Clinical Hospital, Moscow
8. Benjamin Zuskin (1899–1952), assistant to and successor to Solomon Mikhoels as director of the Moscow State Jewish Theater
9. Joseph Yuzefovich (1890–1952), a researcher at the Institute of History, Soviet Academy of Sciences, trade union leader
10. Leon Talmi (1893–1952), translator, journalist, a former member of the Communist Party USA
11. Ilya Vatenberg (1887–1952), translator and editor of Eynikeyt, newspaper of the JAC; Labor Zionist leader in Austria and the U.S. before returning to the USSR in 1933
12. Chaika Vatenberg-Ostrovskaya (1901–1952), wife of Ilya Vatenberg, a translator at JAC.
13. Solomon Bregman (1895–1953), Deputy Commissar of Foreign Affairs. Fell into a coma after denouncing the trial, and died in prison five months after the executions
14. Lina Stern (or Shtern) (1878–1968), a biochemist, physiologist and humanist and the first female academician in the Russian Academy of Sciences and is best known for her pioneering work on the blood–brain barrier. She was the only survivor out of the 15 defendants.

Some who were either directly or indirectly connected to the JAC at the time were also arrested in the years surrounding the trial. Although Solomon Mikhoels was not arrested, some have alleged that his death was ordered by Stalin in 1948. Der Nister, another Yiddish writer, was arrested in 1949, and died in a labour camp in 1950. Literary critic Yitzhak Nusinov died in prison, and journalists Shmuel Persov and Miriam Zheleznova were shot – all in 1950.

== Trial ==
The trial began on 8 May 1952 and lasted until the sentencing on 18 July. The structure of the trial was peculiar due to the fact that there were no prosecutors or defence attorneys, simply three military judges. This was in accordance with Soviet law at the time, but is characterized by American writer and activist Joshua Rubenstein as "nothing less than terror masquerading as law." While some defendants admitted their guilt, others pled partially guilty and some maintained their innocence. Since the trial was not public, the defendants made expressive and often lengthy statements professing their innocence. The defendants also had the opportunity to cross-examine each other, furthering the trial's intense atmosphere. During the trial, defendants answered some questions from judges which were wholly unrelated to the trial and resulted merely from personal curiosities. For example, the judges often asked the defendants about kosher meat and synagogue services.

With extensive statements, arguments, and inconsistencies between the defendants, the trial lasted much longer than the government had desired. On 26 June, experts were called to give testimony about the issues of treason, but they ultimately acknowledged that "their judgment was incomplete and insufficient." It became clear that some pieces of evidence had been tremendously exaggerated. For example, a statement by Leon Talmy that a particular Russian village was "not as pretty" as a certain Kan village was used as evidence of his nationalist tendencies. Alexander Cheptsov, the lead judge of the trial, confronted with such a great number of discrepancies and contradictions, twice made attempts to appeal to the Soviet leadership to reopen the investigation and was denied both times. Even after sentencing the defendants, Cheptsov attempted to lengthen the process by declining to immediately execute the defendants.

== Sentence ==
The sentence stated that the defendants would receive "the severest measure of punishment for the crimes committed by them jointly: execution, with all of their property to be confiscated." The court also stripped the men of their medals and made petitions to remove civilian commendations such as the Order of Lenin and the Order of the Red Banner of Labour. On 12 August 1952, 13 of the defendants (excluding Lina Stern and Solomon Bregman) were executed in the basement of Lubyanka Prison. After the execution of the defendants, the trial and its results were kept secret. There was not a single reference to the trial or the execution in Soviet newspapers. Defendants' families were charged with "being relatives of traitors to the motherland" and exiled in December 1952. They did not learn about the fates of their family members until November 1955, when the case was reopened.

The defendant Lina Stern was sentenced to three-and-a-half years in a correctional labour camp, followed by five years of exile; however, after Stalin's death, she was able to return to her home and continue her studies. During the trial, she was determined to be "no less guilty" than the other defendants but was considered important to the state because of her research; she, therefore, received a lesser sentence than the others. Officials counted her time spent in prison before the sentencing towards her labour camp term, so she went into exile immediately after the sentencing.

During his imprisonment, Solomon Bregman collapsed and was placed in the prison infirmary. He remained unconscious until his death on 23 January 1953.

== Aftermath ==
Stalin continued his oppression of Jews with the doctors' plot. Weeks after Stalin's death, on 5 March 1953, the new Soviet leadership renounced the doctors' plot, which led to questions about the similar situation with the JAC defendants. Upon the discovery that much of the testimony from the trial was the result of torture and coercion, the proceedings were reexamined. On 22 November 1955, the Military Collegium of the Supreme Court of the USSR determined that there was "no substance to the charges" against the defendants and closed the case.

Many of the surviving members of the JAC emigrated to Israel in the 1970s. A memorial for the JAC victims was dedicated in Jerusalem in 1977, on the 25th anniversary of the Night of the Murdered Poets.

The anniversary of the murders was commemorated by the activists of the Soviet Jewry Movement in the 1960s through the 1980s as an example of a particularly grim anti-Jewish act by the Soviets.

== See also ==
- 1937 mass execution of Belarusians, known in Belarus as the Night of the Murdered Poets (Ноч расстраляных паэтаў)
- Doctors' plot, an alleged post-war conspiracy by Jewish doctors to murder Stalinist officials, later proved fictitious.
- Nathan Englander, whose short story "The Twenty-seventh Man" is an allusion to this event.
- Raoul Wallenberg, who rescued countless Jews during the Holocaust through the War Refugee Board, was possibly also killed in the Lubyanka Building.
