= De-Stalinization (disambiguation) =

De-Stalinization was the elimination of the consequences of Stalinism in the Soviet Union and some other states:

- De-Stalinization (Czechoslovakia)
- De-Stalinization (Poland)
- De-Stalinization (Romania)
- De-Stalinization (Eastern Bloc)
