= Leon Talmi =

Yiddish journalist (1893–1952)

- Леон Яковлевич Тальми לעאָן טאַלמי
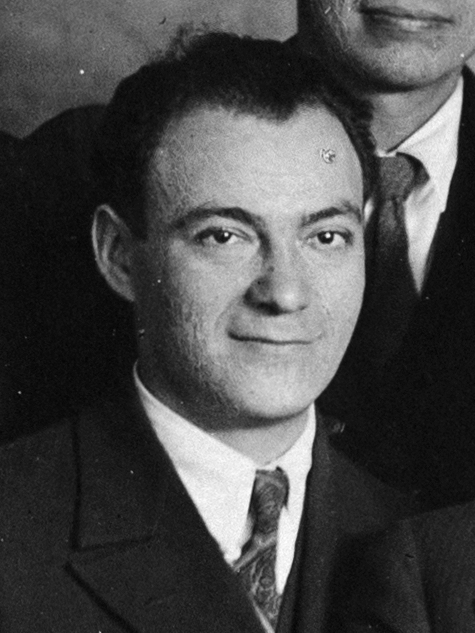
- Talmi c. 1922–1923
- Born: Lejser Talminowiecki; January 23, 1893; Lyakhavichy, Minsk Governorate, Russian Empire (now Belarus)
- Died: August 12, 1952 (aged 59); Moscow, Russian SFSR, Soviet Union
- Burial place: Donskoy Cemetery, Moscow, Russia
- Occupations: Journalist, translator
- Known for: Member of the Jewish Anti-Fascist Committee; executed in the Night of the Murdered Poets
- Notable work: Book on 1929 Birobidzhan expedition: Af royer erd, mit der “ikor” ekspeditsye in biro-bidzhan
- Movement: Communism, Yiddish journalism, Jewish territorialism
- Spouse: Sofya Tsamian‑Rosenberg
- Children: Vladimir Talmi

Leon Yakovlevich Talmi (January 23, 1893 – August 12, 1952; Russian: Леон Яковлевич Тальми) (Yiddish: טאַלמי,לעאָן), also known as Leon Talmy, was a Yiddish journalist and translator. He was executed in Moscow on the Night of the Murdered Poets.

== Early life and education ==
Talmi was born to a middle-class family as Lejser Talminowiecki in Lachowicze, now in present-day Belarus. His early education was in a cheder, then gymnasium. His father, a merchant, died when he was young, throwing the family into financial distress. He emigrated to the U.S. in 1912 and became Leon Talmi. He came with his older brother, who was threatened with conscription, and completed his secondary education in Sioux City, Iowa. By 1915, his mother had joined him as well as eight further siblings. From 1914 to 1917 he was a member of the central committee of the Socialist Party of America. Leon Talmi became a significant figure in the Yiddish-speaking wing of the American communist movement, particularly through his work in journalism and cultural life, though he was not among the formal founders of the Communist Party USA.

== Journalism and translation career ==
He moved to New York, beginning his Yiddish journalism career in 1916 when he became "secretary" for the territorialist newspaper Unzer Vort, published by the Middlewestern Territorial Committee of the Jewish Socialist-Territorialist Labor Party. He returned to Russia in 1917 to participate in the February Revolution, but did not become a Soviet Communist Party member as he had no pre-revolutionary party credentials. In 1917 he worked for the Naye tsayt (New Time), published in Kiev, the daily Yiddish newspaper of the United Jewish Socialist Workers Party (Fareynikhte), contributing essays and articles. Fareynikhte eventually merged with the Russian Communist Party.

In 1920 he moved to Moscow and worked as a translator for People's Commissariat for Nationalities and then for the press department of the Executive Committee of the Communist International (ECCI). He did not find this work satisfying and wished to return to journalism, particularly in the U.S. In 1921 he worked for the press section of Comintern; his request was granted and he was sent to New York. In the U.S., he was a contributor to Morgn-frayhayt, the Communist newspaper of New York, and was an editor of several Communist monthly magazines; he was a correspondent for a Russian newspaper and contributed to The Nation. While in the U.S. he was active in the Soviet plans to have Jews colonize Birobidzhan in Siberia, an agricultural experiment to create a Yiddish language social Jewish homeland, an alternative to Zionism.

In 1924 he helped found IKOR, an organization supporting this plan. American left-leaning commentary generally did not favor the idea; it was described as part of a "relentless Soviet struggle against Zionism," and criticized as a Communistiche pushke (collection box). In 1929 he led an expedition there accompanied by Ilya Ehrenberg, writing a book about the trip in 1931. The book is described as pro-Soviet, "full of rapturous praise for Jewish migrants' epic." After returning to the U.S. he continued working on pro-Soviet periodicals. By 1934 he had largely withdrawn from Yiddish matters and had moved permanently back to the Soviet Union. In Moscow, he was the editor of the English section of the State Publishing House for Literature in Foreign Languages; he oversaw the translation of Marxist–Leninist classics and the Moscow trials.

Talmi was felt by the Soviets to "have great popularity in New York." His prestige led to important assignments, such as leading the Birobidzhan trip, and accompanying poet Vladimir Mayakovsky on a trip to the United States in 1925, translating his poems into English and Yiddish.

== World War II and the JAC ==
When war broke out, he was assigned to be a translator for the Soviet Information Bureau (Sovinformburo); this was his final job. After his son's arrest in 1947, Talmi was immediately fired. He continued receiving assignments as there were not many others with his credentials.

In 1942 he joined the Jewish Anti-Fascist Committee (JAC) in Moscow, writing articles against fascism. The 70-member committee was established by Stalin to encourage help from the West for the Soviet war effort. When the war ended, Stalin became suspicious of their activities.

== Execution and exoneration ==
Talmi was arrested on July 2, 1952, accused of espionage and anti-Soviet and nationalist activities; he was arrested 6 months after the others. Initially he pleaded innocent. After "monstrous pressure of the investigators," he gradually gave confessions. He was executed on August 12, 1952, along with 12 other members of JAC. Talmi and the others were posthumously exonerated in 1955. The court found that there was no evidence to accuse Talmi, or the others, of treason, espionage or other counter-revolutionary actions, and "persons involved in this case were convicted unjustifiably." A plaque honoring Talmi was installed at his "Last Address," Moscow, Kapelsky Lane, 13.

== Family ==
Talmi with wife, Sofya Tsamian-Rosenberg, and son, Vladimir

His wife, Sofya Tsamian-Rosenberg, was exiled in 1953 and released in 1955, at the time of her husband's rehabilitation. She died in the U.S. in 1988. His son, Vladimir, was imprisoned in 1947. He was an officer who had fought at the front and was working in the Soviet economic division in Berlin, communicating in English with the Allies. In Stalin's post-war Russia, serving as an intermediary with Western forces led to a charge of anti-Soviet activity. He was released in 1956, finished his education and worked in publishing and translation in Moscow. In 1979 he emigrated to the U.S. where he taught and worked in publishing. He wrote his memoirs ("Full Circle. New York and Back. The Story of My Life") and died in 2012.
