= Boris Shimeliovich =

Russian physician (1892–1952)

Boris Shimeliovich after his arrest for espionage on 13 January 1949

Boris Abramovich Shimeliovich (Russian: Борис Абрамович Шимелиович, 1892 – 1952) was the medical director of Moscow's Botkin Hospital, a well known and widely respected institution.

Born in Riga, he was an active revolutionary who participated in the Russian Civil War and eventually became active in Jewish Anti-Fascist Committee (JAC). Shimeliovich was arrested on January 13, 1949, for espionage. He was so severely beaten during the interrogations that he had to be carried on a stretcher into the court three years after. He was executed in August 1952 together with other members of JAC, which became known as the Night of the Murdered Poets.

On November 22, 1955 (well after Joseph Stalin's death in 1953), military collegium of the Supreme Court of the Soviet Union withdrew the indictments against the JAC members due to the lack of evidence. Shimeliovich's Communist Party of the Soviet Union membership was restored only in 1988.

His brother was Iulius Shimeliovich (1890-1919), a former member of Bund turned Bolshevik revolutionary.
