= Lina Stern =

Soviet biochemist

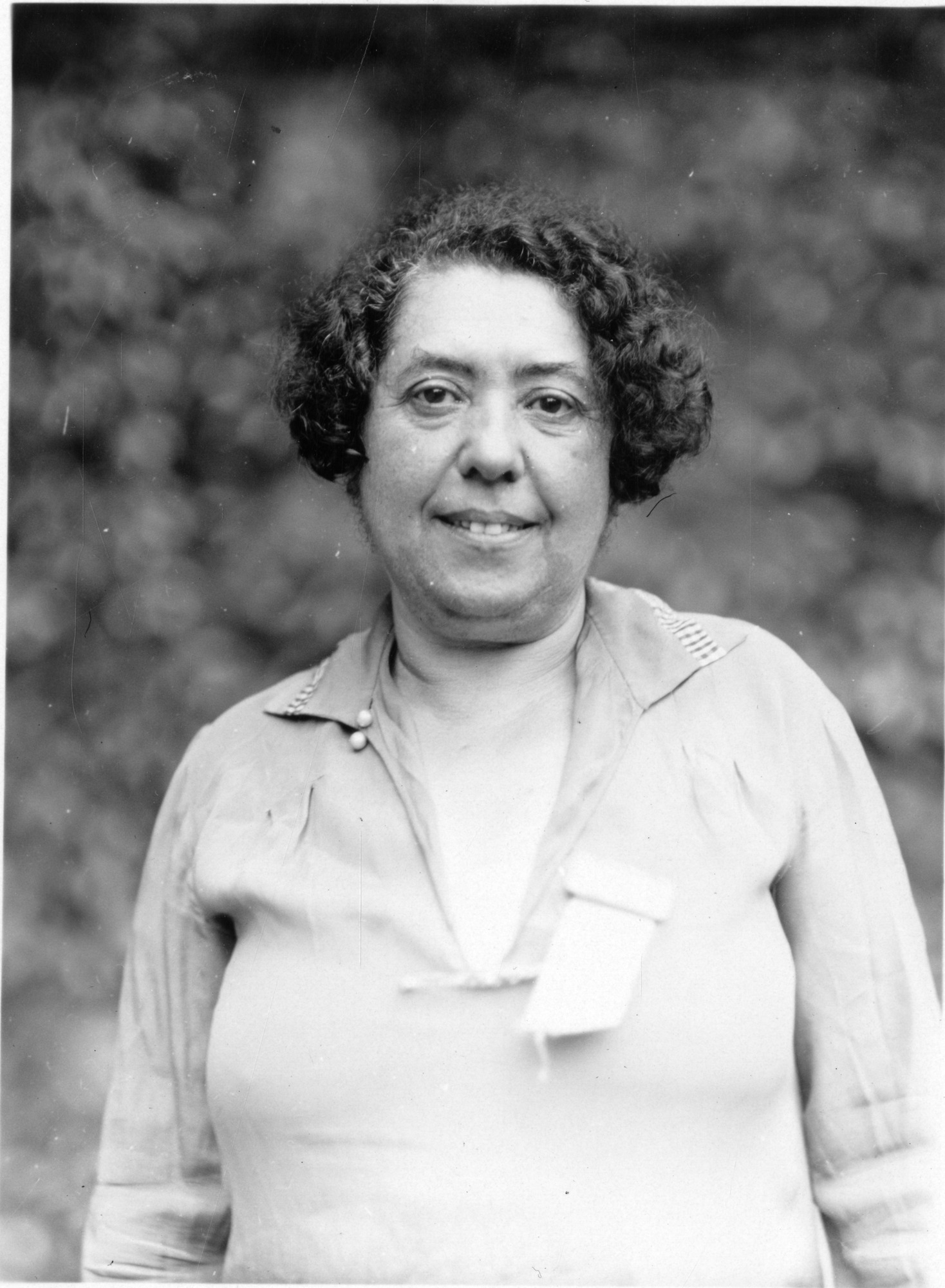
- Born: 26 August 1878; Liepāja, Courland Governorate, Russian Empire
- Died: 7 March 1968 (aged 89); Moscow, Russian SFSR, Soviet Union
- Education: University of Geneva
- Known for: The first female professor at the University of Geneva, the first female member of the USSR Academy of Sciences
- Awards: Stalin Prize (1943)
- Scientific career
- Fields: blood–brain barrier, biochemistry, neuroscience
- Workplaces: Moscow 2nd Medical Institute, Institute of Physiology, Biophysics Institute

Lina Solomonovna Stern or Shtern (Russian: Лина Соломоновна Штерн; 26 August 1878 – 7 March 1968) was a Soviet biochemist, physiologist and humanist whose medical discoveries saved thousands of lives at the fronts of World War II. She is best known for her pioneering work on the blood–brain barrier, which she described as hemato-encephalic barrier in 1921.

== Biography ==
=== Early life ===
On August 26, 1878, Lina Stern was born in Liepāja (today Liepāja, Latvia), the largest city in the Courland Region situated in western Latvia (Other sources noted she was born in Vilijampole district of Kaunas in 1875 and studied in Liepāja at high school). She was from a wealthy large Jewish family. In 1898, Stern studied at the University of Geneva, Switzerland. However, before going to Switzerland, she tried to gain admission to Moscow University. Due to her Jewish background, it was very difficult for her to gain admission into Russian universities, which is why she had to study abroad instead. Stern became friends with wives of Georgi Plekhanov and Aleksei Bach in Switzerland.

=== Career ===
In 1903, she wrote her doctoral dissertation on motor function of the urethra and received the degree of Doctor of Medicine. Despite the fact that Switzerland was more liberal than other European countries, Stern still had no professional prospects there. She returned to her Liepāja. There, she passed the exams to get her Doctor of Medicine degree in Russia. The reason she did this was because the policies at the time did not view a certificate from a foreign university to be acceptable. She was preparing to search for a medical job in Russia, but Jean-Louis Prévost (the head of the Department of Physiology at the University of Geneva) invited her to work as his assistant at the department. She accepted his invitation.

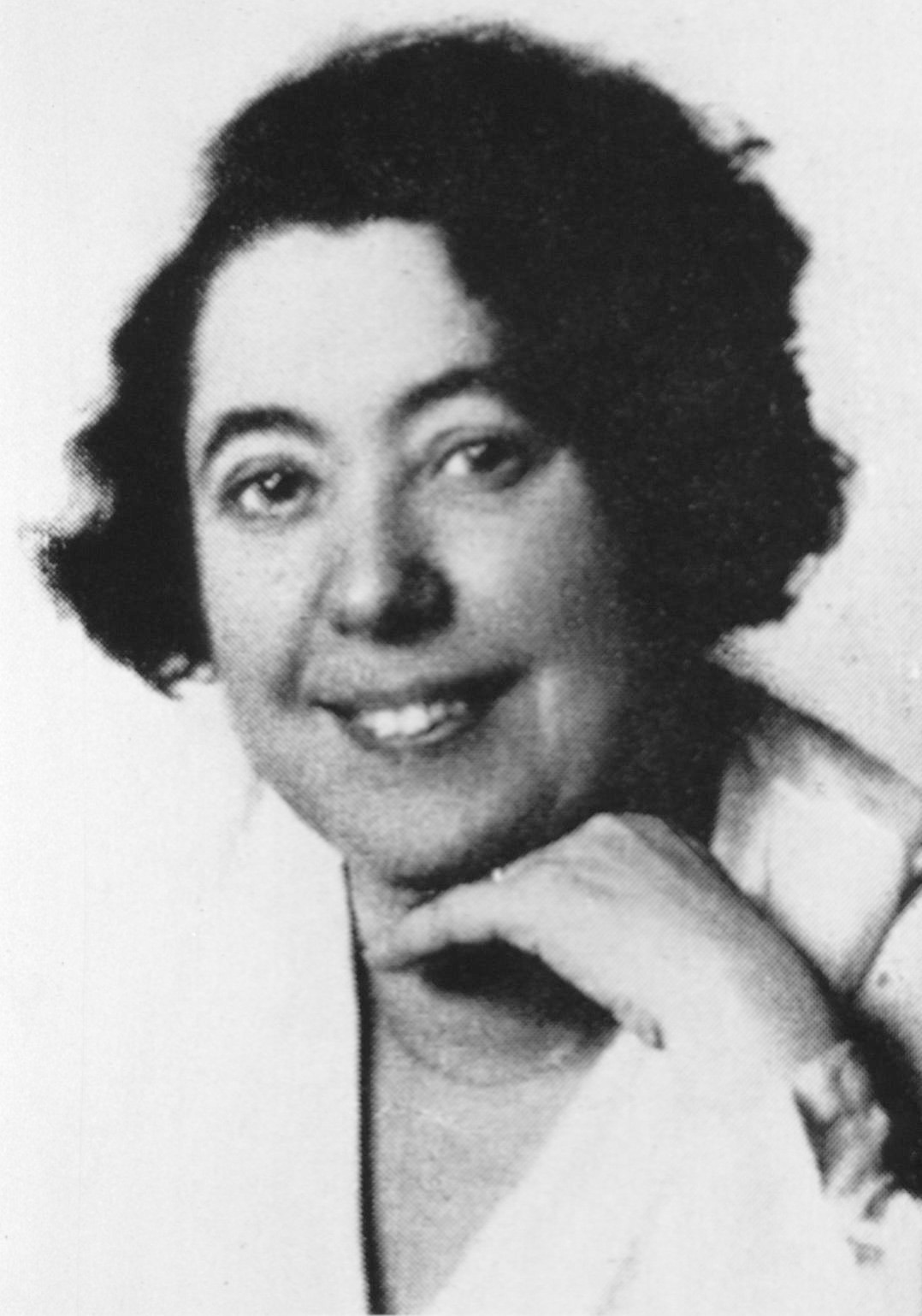
Stern photographed circa 1910

From 1904 to 1922, Stern worked with Frédéric Battelli to conduct original research into chemio-physiology. During that time period, they published 54 articles on the problem of cellular metabolism. In 1912, Battelli and Stern, along with Torsten Thunberg, “discovered that minced animal tissues contain substances that can transfer hydrogen atoms from specific intracellular organic acids to methylene blue dye, reducing it to a colorless form.” Their research was later on able to help Hans Krebs (biochemist) and his groundbreaking work on cellular respiration

Due to her groundbreaking research and hard work, the University of Geneva allowed her to add Physiological Chemistry as an independent field of study to the curriculum of the medical faculty. In 1918, a new department of Physiological Chemistry was established, and Lina Stern became the head of it. This made her the first ever woman to be awarded professional rank at the University of Geneva.

It was from there that her research into the physiology of the central nervous system began – partly influenced by her friendship with Constantin von Monakow. Initially, Giuseppe Pagano, Professor of Chemical Physiology at the Medical School of University of Palermo, started experimenting on animals to learn more about motor response and the cerebellum. “Stern and her associate E. Rothlin replicated Pagano's experiment using more accurate methods.” This was the start of Stern’s lifelong research into the cerebrospinal fluid. Her research led her to groundbreaking conclusions about the blood-brain barrier.

On April 21, 1921, Stern introduced the term "blood-brain barrier" at the Medical Society of Geneva. At that time, she was already well known in the world of academic science. However, she also worked as a consultant for several pharmaceutical companies.

After Stern received an invitation to head the chair of physiology at the Second Moscow State University in 1924, she accepted and arrived in Moscow on March 31, 1925. She was 48 years old in 1925. Her entire life was devoted to science, and she accomplished quite a lot in her first three years as the chair of the department. On April 1, 1929, a new Institute of physiology was opened in the Academy of Sciences of the Soviet Union, and Stern became the director. She was very active in the scientific community and well known amongst her colleagues. In 1939, she became the first female full member, academician, of the Academy of Sciences of the Soviet Union. In 1943 she won the Stalin Prize.

=== Defeat of the Anti-Fascist Committee ===
She was accused of cosmopolitanism and admiration for the West by the Soviet government in 1948. Her Institute in Moscow was closed. Stern was arrested in 1949 by the Ministry of State Security (MGB) and interrogated by the head of MGB Viktor Abakumov.

The Soviet government decided to eradicate the Jewish Anti-Fascist Committee (JAC) in the late 1940s as an anti-Soviet organization. A member of the Antifascist Committee of Soviet Women and the JAC since the outbreak of World War II, Stern was the sole survivor out of 15 arrested and convicted to death sentence when the JAC was eradicated in January 1949. Her death sentence was changed to a prison term by Joseph Stalin, followed by five-year exile. The exile was in Dzhambul (current Taraz), Kazakhstan.

=== Life after exile ===
After Stalin's death in 1953, life became easier. She returned from exile to Moscow. Stern continued to research for blood–brain barrier. Finally, she was exonerated by the Presidium in 1958. She headed the Department of Physiology at the Biophysics Institute between 1954 and 1968.

Lina Stern died on March 7, 1968.

== Research on the blood–brain barrier ==
The blood–brain barrier refers to a diffusion barrier formed by the endothelial walls of the blood vessels and capillaries in the brain. This barrier prevents most substances in the blood from entering the brain while allowing small molecules like oxygen and carbon dioxide to diffuse freely. While working at the University of Geneva, Stern published a series of studies demonstrating the existence of the blood-brain barrier with colleague Raymond Gautier. Beginning in 1918, the two performed systematic experiments on the movement of various substances from the blood into the nervous system and estimated the extent to which these substances were able to permeate the brain. From these studies they were able to conclude that there exists a barrier between the blood and brain, which they termed in French "barrière hématoencéphalique". In a 1934 paper, Stern also independently introduced the notions of barrier selectivity and barrier resistance, realizing that the blood–brain barrier both selectively allows certain substances to enter the brain and protects the internal milieu of the brain from that of the blood. Today these are acknowledged as two of the main functions of the blood–brain barrier.

== See also ==
- Dmitri Bashkirov, her nephew.
