= SOUD =

Database shared by intelligence agencies of the USSR and its satellites

SOUD, standing for System of Joint Acquisition of Enemy Data was a computerized intelligence exchange system where information acquired by the intelligence and security agencies from participating Warsaw Pact countries was stored.

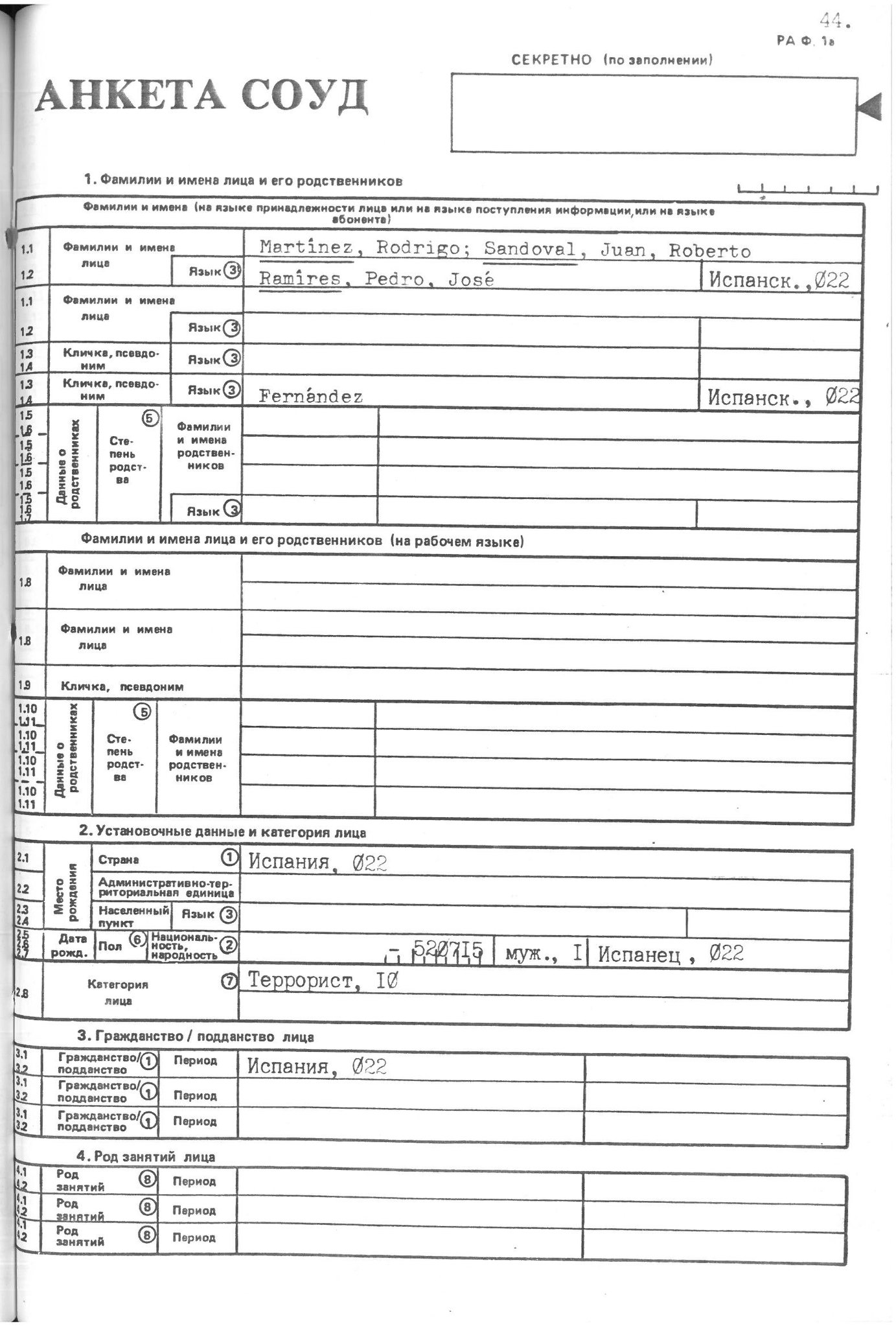
The application form for the SOUD system

The intelligence exchange organization was founded in 1977, and its initial goal was to safeguard the USSR from 'foreign threats' during the 1980 Olympics in Moscow. Stasi engineers conceived the system using stolen Western technology, and it was operational in 1979. Its main computer was based in Moscow, the input language was Russian and the USSR had control over access to the system. Nevertheless, the Stasi was the foremost contributor of the intelligence exchange system, with around a quarter of the entries submitted, followed only by the KGB. Other members of SOUD were Bulgaria, Hungary, Poland, Czechoslovakia, Mongolia and Cuba. They were later joined by Vietnam. In the Polish People's Republic, the V Department of Bureau "C" of the Security Service, established in June 1977, was responsible for data exchange within the SOUD system. In the USSR, the system was subordinated to the 16th Department of the KGB and the 6th Department of the GRU.

Because of the boycott of the Summer Olympics of 1980, most of the potential threats did not materialise, but the system remained operational. Its databases include names of agents, zionists, hostile religious organisations, organisations of emigrants, journalists, diplomats, cultural and commercial attachés, representatives of airlines, etc. etc. Information found in Stasi documents reveals that in 1989 more than 11,100 names were collected. Most of them included a personal description, the maiden name of the mother and a sample of the handwriting. A query could be handled in less than four hours time.

== Bibliography ==
- Jan Bury: “'Informatyka w służbach specjalnych PRL”' (IT in the Special Services of the Polish People's Republic), Warsaw 2017, ISBN 978-83-65750-09-9.
- Christopher Andrew, Oleg Gordievsky: “'KGB”', Warsaw 1997, ISBN 83-11-08667-2.
- ABW officers: Cooperation between the Security Service of the Ministry of Internal Affairs of the Polish People's Republic and the KGB of the USSR in the years 1970–1990. An attempt at assessment Central Training Centre named after Major General Stefan Rowecki ‘Grot’ Warsaw 2013, ISBN 978-83-929-271-4-3.
- Michał Grocki: “'Informers are among us...”', Warsaw 1992, ISBN 8385195874.
- Tomek Prokop: “'Systém sjednocené evidence poznatků o nepříteli v československých podmínkách”', Praha 2008, ISBN 978-80-87211-05-2.
- Bodo Wegmann (1996), SOUD: Das geheimdienstliche Datennetz des östlichen Bündnissystems, Monika Tantzscher, Berlin: The Federal Commissioner for the Records of the State Security Service of the former German Democratic Republic, Department of Education and Research, ISBN 978-3-942130-44-8, OCLC 603770360
