= Solomon Bregman =

Russian writer (1895–1953)

Personal life
- Born: Solomon Bregman; 1895 Zlynka, Russian Empire
- Died: 23 January 1953 (aged 57–58) Soviet Union

Religious life
- Religion: Judaism
- Denomination: Jewish

Jewish leader
- Other: writer and researcher

Solomon Bregman (in Russian, Соломон Брегман) (1895, Zlynka, Kirovohrad Oblast – 1953) was a prominent member of the Jewish Anti-Fascist Committee formed in the Soviet Union in April 1942. The committee was led by the famous Yiddish actor Solomon Mikhoels.

Bregman was born in the town of Zlynka in the Kherson Governorate of the Russian Empire (present-day Kirovohrad Oblast of Ukraine). Bregman had been a deputy minister of State Control and an active party member since 1912, when he was also appointed a Deputy Commissar of Foreign Affairs. He was editor-in-chief of The Book About Jews-Heroes of the War against Fascism. He also participated in collecting materials for Black Book, a publication detailing the extermination of the Jews of the Soviet Union by the Germans and their collaborators during World War II. He joined JAC in 1944 when he was also recruited as an informant of the secret service MGB.

When I did go to the Jewish Anti-Fascist Committee, I discovered abnormalities there. I knew a bit of Yiddish, but I couldn't read the language well. I started reading Eynikayt with difficulty and saw how sessions were held at the committee, and I saw that from an organizational and political standpoint there was chaos there. the village councils operated back in 1919, when I often ran into this kind of thing.

He was arrested together with other members of the Jewish Anti-Fascist Committee in 1948. Having never admitted his guilt, "I had no involvement in the Crimea question and could not have had any involvement at presidium sessions," he declared to the trial judge.

He died in jail of heart disease on January 23, 1953. After surviving severe beatings he had fallen into a deep coma on 16 June, in which state he remained when the death sentence was passed on all of his comrades. Among their number only Lina Stern was spared.

== Notes and references ==
- Rubenstein, Joshua; Naumov, Vladimir P.; Wolfson, Laura Esther (2002). "Stalin's Secret Pogrom: The Postwar Inquisition of the Jewish Anti-Fascist Committee". Slavic Review. 61 (3). Cambridge University Press: 628–629. doi:10.2307/3090346. JSTOR 3090346.
