= Aaron Katz (Soviet general) =

Aaron Davidovich Katz
- Born: 1901; Ryasny, Russian Empire
- Died: 1971 (aged 69–70); Moscow, Soviet Union
- Military career
- Allegiance: (Soviet Union) USSR
- Branch: Red Army
- Service years: 1919; 1942–1947
- Rank: Major general
- Conflicts: World War II

Aaron Davidovich Katz (Russian: Аарон Давидович Кац; 1901 – 1971) was a major general in the Red Army and a member of the Jewish Anti-Fascist Committee (JAC).

Born in the town (shtetl) of Ryasny in Mogilev Governorate (present-day Belarus), he joined the army in 1919 and later graduated from a military academy.

He was trained as an engineer and became head of the faculty for motorised forces at the Stalin Military Academy. During the Second World War he was deputy commander of a motorised army corps and received the Order of the Patriotic War.

From 1942 he led the Red Army agency responsible for the draft and for the formation of army divisions. Because of the enormous losses suffered by the army, this position was of great importance. However, his service did not prevent his discharge from the army in 1947 and subsequent arrest in 1948 as a member of the JAC. He survived beatings and was released from jail upon Joseph Stalin's death in 1953. He died in Moscow in 1971.
