= Joseph Stalin =

Leader of the Soviet Union from 1924 to 1953

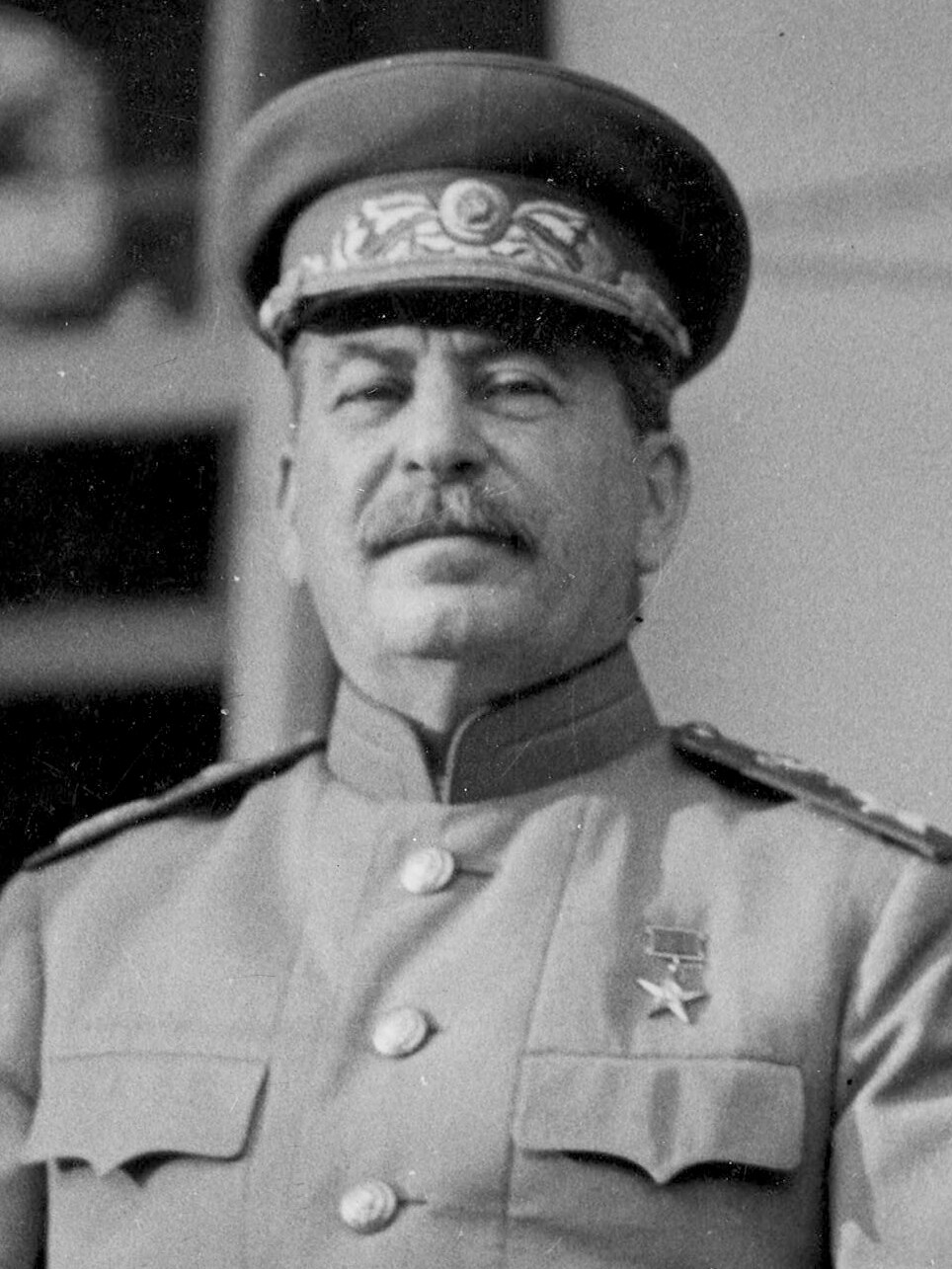
- Stalin at the Tehran Conference in 1943

General Secretary of the Communist Party of the Soviet Union
- In office 3 April 1922 – 10 February 1934
- Preceded by: Vyacheslav Molotov (as Responsible Secretary)
- Succeeded by: Nikita Khrushchev (as First Secretary from 1953)

Premier of the Soviet Union
- In office 6 May 1941 – 5 March 1953
- President: Mikhail Kalinin; Nikolai Shvernik
- First Deputies: Nikolai Voznesensky; Vyacheslav Molotov; Nikolai Bulganin
- Preceded by: Vyacheslav Molotov
- Succeeded by: Georgy Malenkov

Minister of the Armed Forces of the Soviet Union (Note: Before 1946, the title of the office was People's Commissar for Defence, and briefly People's Commissar for the Armed Forces.)
- In office 19 July 1941 – 3 March 1947
- Premier: Himself
- Preceded by: Semyon Timoshenko
- Succeeded by: Nikolai Bulganin

People's Commissar for Nationalities of the Russian SFSR
- In office 8 November 1917 – 7 July 1923
- Premier: Vladimir Lenin
- Preceded by: Office established
- Succeeded by: Office abolished

Personal details
- Born: Ioseb Besarionis dze Jughashvili; 18 December [O.S. 6 December] 1878 Gori, Russian Empire (now in Georgia)
- Died: 5 March 1953 (aged 74) Moscow, Soviet Union
- Resting place: Lenin's Mausoleum (1953–1961); Kremlin Wall Necropolis (since 1961)
- Party: CPSU (Note: Founded as the RSDLP(b) in 1912; renamed the RCP(b) in 1918, AUCP(b) in 1925, and CPSU in 1952.) (from 1912)
- Other political affiliations: RSDLP (1898–1912; Bolshevik faction from 1903)
- Spouses: Ekaterine Svanidze (m. 1906; died 1907) Nadezhda Alliluyeva (m. 1919; died 1932)
- Children: Yakov Dzhugashvili; Vasily Stalin; Artyom Sergeyev (adopted); Svetlana Alliluyeva
- Parents: Besarion Jughashvili; Ekaterine Geladze
- Cabinet: Stalin I–II–III
- Awards: Full list
- Nickname: Koba

Military service
- Allegiance: Russian SFSR; Soviet Union
- Branch: Red Army
- Years of service: 1918–1920
- Rank: Generalissimo (from 1945)
- Commands: Soviet Armed Forces (from 1941)
- Battles/wars: Russian Civil War; Battle of Tsaritsyn; Polish–Soviet War; World War II
- Central institution membership: 1917–1953: Full member, 6th–18th Politburo and 19th Presidium of CPSU; 1922–1953: Full member, 11th–19th Secretariat of CPSU; 1920–1952: Full member, 9th–18th Orgburo of CPSU; 1912–1953: Full member, 5th–19th Central Committee of CPSU; 1918–1919: Full member, 2nd Central Committee of CP(b)U; Other offices held: 1941–1945: Chairman, State Defence Committee of the Soviet Union; 1920–1922: People's Commissar for Workers' and Peasants' Inspection of the Russian SFSR; 1919–1920: People's Commissar for State Control of the Russian SFSR; 1917–1918: Member of the Russian Constituent Assembly for Petrograd Metropolis
- Leader of the Soviet Union: ← Lenin; Khrushchev→
- Stalin's voice Stalin addresses the German Instrument of Surrender. Recorded 9 May 1945

Joseph Vissarionovich Stalin (Note: English: /ˈstɑːlɪn/) (Note: In Russian: Iosif Vissarionovich Stalin (Иосиф Виссарионович Сталин).) (born Ioseb Besarionis dze Jughashvili; (Note: Stalin's original Georgian name was Ioseb Besarionis dze Jughashvili (იოსებ ბესარიონის ძე ჯუღაშვილი). The Russian equivalent of this is Iosif Vissarionovich Dzhugashvili (Иосиф Виссарионович Джугашвили). During his years as a revolutionary, he adopted the alias "Stalin", and after the October Revolution he made it his legal name.) 18 December 1878 – 5 March 1953) was a Soviet politician and revolutionary who led the Soviet Union from the late 1920s until his death in 1953, holding the title of General Secretary of the Communist Party of the Soviet Union from 1922 to 1934, de facto to his death, and serving as the nation's premier from 1941 to 1953. Initially part of a collective leadership within a one-party system, he ultimately consolidated personal power to become the country's de facto dictator by the 1930s. Ideologically committed to the Leninist interpretation of Marxism, Stalin helped to formalise these ideas as Marxism–Leninism, while his own policies became known as Stalinism.

Born into a poor Georgian family in Gori, Russian Empire, Stalin began his revolutionary career as a youth by joining the Marxist Russian Social Democratic Labour Party. Active in the Caucasus, he raised funds for Vladimir Lenin's Bolshevik faction through robberies and other crimes, and was repeatedly arrested and exiled to Siberia. After the Bolsheviks seized power in the October Revolution of 1917, Stalin joined the party's Politburo and served as the People's Commissar for Nationalities. He began his rise to power after Lenin's death in 1924, using his role as general secretary to outmaneuver his rivals. Under Stalin's policy of "Socialism in One Country" and his five-year plans from 1928, the country underwent rapid agricultural collectivisation and industrialization, replacing the New Economic Policy with a centralised command economy. State policy contributed to a major famine in 1930–1933, with Ukraine and Kazakhstan most affected. To eliminate his political rivals and those deemed "enemies of the working class", Stalin oversaw the Great Purge between 1936 and 1939, during which at least 700,000 people were executed and over a million were imprisoned in the Gulag system.

Stalin's government promoted Marxism–Leninism abroad through the Communist International and supported anti-fascist movements in Europe during the 1930s, particularly in the Spanish Civil War. In 1939, it signed a non-aggression pact with Nazi Germany, resulting in their joint invasion of Poland and the Soviet annexation of the Baltic states. Germany ended the pact by invading the Soviet Union in 1941; despite initial setbacks, the Red Army repelled Axis forces and captured Berlin in 1945, ending World War II in Europe. The Soviets helped establish aligned governments in Central and Eastern Europe, China and North Korea, forming the Eastern Bloc and emerging as a world superpower. Stalin led his country through its reconstruction and the start of the Cold War with the United States, overseeing its development of nuclear weapons in 1949. In these years, the country experienced another major famine and a new wave of political purges. Stalin died in 1953 and was ultimately succeeded by Nikita Khrushchev, who denounced his predecessor and initiated a campaign of de-Stalinisation throughout Soviet society.

Widely considered one of the most significant figures of the 20th century, Stalin was the subject of a pervasive personality cult within the international Marxist–Leninist movement, for whom he was a champion of socialism and the working class. Since the dissolution of the Soviet Union in 1991, he has retained popularity in Russia as a victorious wartime leader who established the Soviet Union as one of the world's foremost great powers. Conversely, Stalin's totalitarian regime has been widely condemned for overseeing a system marked by mass repression, ethnic cleansing, and the deaths of millions.

== Early life ==
Stalin was born on 18 December [O.S. 6 December] 1878 (Note: According to church records, Stalin was born on 18 December [O.S. 6 December] 1878. This birth date is maintained in all surviving pre-Revolution documents, and as late as 1921, he himself listed his birthday as 18 December 1878. After coming to power, he gave his birth date as 21 December [O.S. 9 December] 1879. This became the day Stalin's birthday was celebrated in the Soviet Union.) into a Georgian family in Gori, a city in Tiflis Governorate, Russian Empire. His birth name was Ioseb Besarionis dze Jughashvili (Russified as Iosif Vissarionovich Dzhugashvili). (Note: Stalin's birth name was Ioseb Besarionis dze Jughashvili (იოსებ ბესარიონის ძე ჯუღაშვილი), represented in Russian as Iosif Vissarionovich Dzhugashvili (Иосиф Виссарионович Джугашвили ɪosʲɪf vʲɪsərʲɪonəvʲɪd͡ʑ d͡ʐʐʊɡɐʂvʲilʲɪ; pre-1918: Іосифъ Виссаріоновичъ Джугашвили). He adopted the alias "Stalin" during his revolutionary career and made it his legal name after the October Revolution.) His parents were Besarion Jughashvili and Ekaterine Geladze; Stalin was their third child and the only one to survive past infancy. After Besarion's shoemaking workshop went into decline, the family fell into poverty, and he became an alcoholic who beat Ekaterine and Stalin. The two left the home by 1883, moving through nine different rented rooms. In 1888, Stalin enrolled at the Gori Church School, where he excelled. Stalin faced health problems: an 1884 smallpox infection left him with facial scars, and at age 12, he was seriously injured when he was struck by a phaeton, causing a lifelong disability in his left arm.

In 1894, Stalin enrolled as a trainee Russian Orthodox priest at the Tiflis Theological Seminary, enabled by a scholarship. He initially achieved high grades, but lost interest in his studies. Stalin became influenced by Nikolay Chernyshevsky's pro-revolutionary novel What Is to Be Done?, and Alexander Kazbegi's The Patricide, with Stalin adopting the nickname "Koba" from its bandit protagonist. After reading Das Kapital, he focused on Karl Marx's philosophy of Marxism, which was on the rise as a variety of socialism opposed to the Tsarist authorities. He began attending secret workers' meetings and left the seminary in April 1899.

=== 1899–1905: Russian Social Democratic Labour Party ===
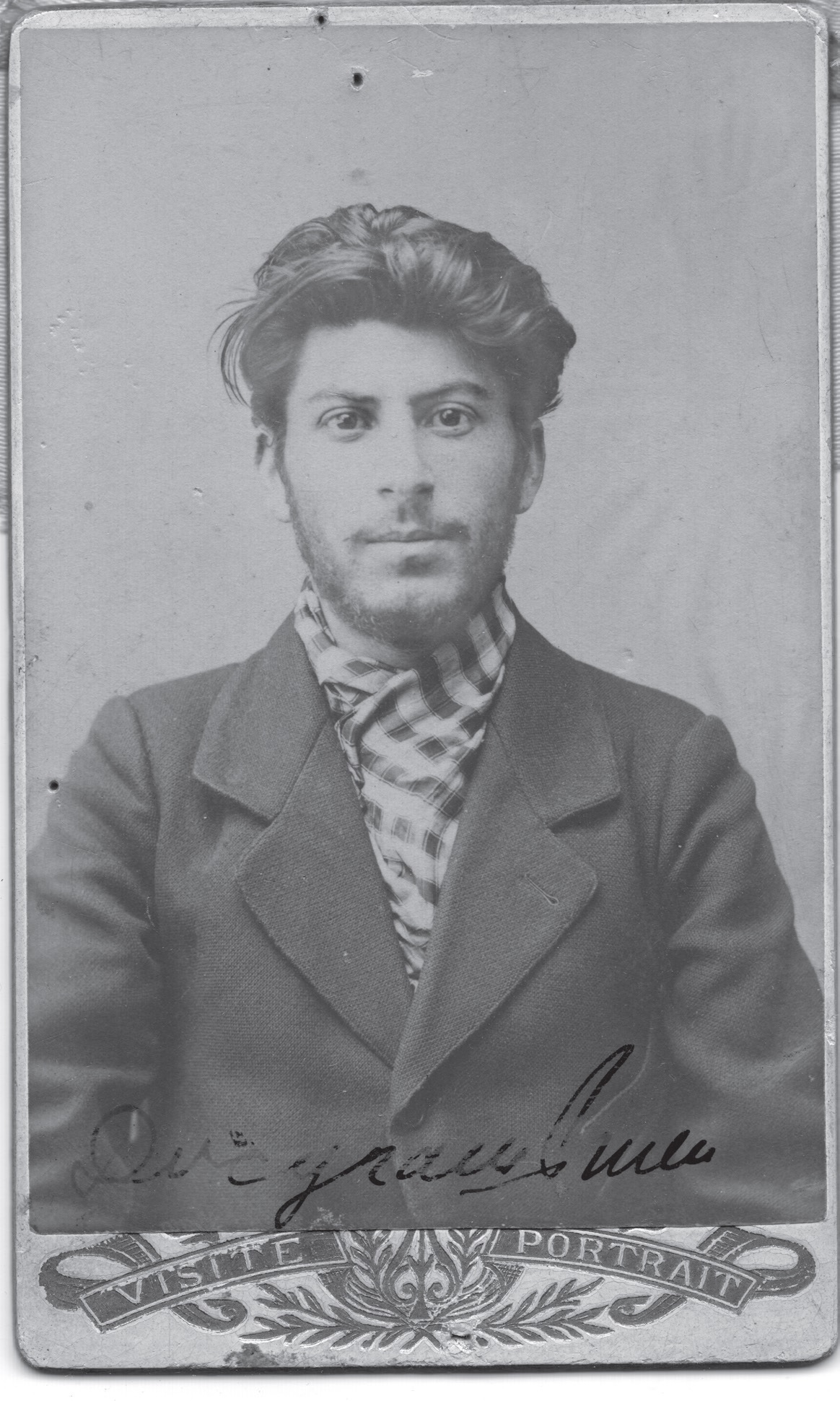
Police photo of Stalin, 1902

During October 1899, Stalin worked as a meteorologist at the Tiflis observatory. He attracted a group of socialist supporters, and co-organised a secret workers' meeting, where he convinced many to strike on May Day 1900. The empire's secret police, the Okhrana, became aware of Stalin's activities and attempted to arrest him in March 1901, but he went into hiding during which he lived off donations from friends. He helped plan a demonstration in Tiflis on May Day 1901, at which 3,000 marchers clashed with the authorities. Stalin was elected to the Tiflis Committee of the Russian Social Democratic Labour Party (RSDLP), a Marxist party founded in 1898, in November 1901.

That month, he travelled to Batumi. His militant rhetoric proved divisive among the city's Marxists, some of whom suspected that he was an agent provocateur. Stalin began working at the Rothschild refinery storehouse, where he co-organised two workers' strikes. After the strike leaders were arrested, he co-organised a mass demonstration which led to the storming of the prison. Stalin was arrested in April 1902 and sentenced to three years exile in Siberia, arriving in Novaya Uda in November 1903. After one failed attempt, Stalin escaped from his exile in January 1904 and travelled to Tiflis, where he co-edited the Marxist newspaper Proletariatis Brdzola ("Proletarian Struggle") with Filipp Makharadze. During his exile, the RSDLP had become divided between Vladimir Lenin's "Bolshevik" faction and Julius Martov's "Mensheviks". Stalin, who detested many Mensheviks in Georgia, aligned himself with the Bolsheviks.

=== 1905–1912: Revolution of 1905 and aftermath ===
In January 1905, government troops massacred protesters in Saint Petersburg and unrest spread across the Empire in the Revolution of 1905. Stalin was in Baku in February when ethnic violence broke out between Armenians and Azeris, and he formed Bolshevik "battle squads" which he used to keep the city's warring ethnic factions apart. His armed squads attacked local police and troops, raided arsenals, and raised funds via protection rackets. In November 1905, the Georgian Bolsheviks elected Stalin as one of their delegates to a Bolshevik conference in Tampere, Finland, where he met Lenin. Although Stalin held Lenin in deep respect, he vocally disagreed with his view that the Bolsheviks should field candidates for the 1906 election to the State Duma; Stalin viewed parliamentary process as a waste of time. In April 1906, he attended the RSDLP's Fourth Congress in Stockholm, where the party—then led by a Menshevik majority—agreed that it would not raise funds using armed robbery. Lenin and Stalin disagreed with this, and privately discussed continuing the robberies for the Bolshevik cause.

Stalin married Kato Svanidze in July 1906, and in March 1907 she gave birth to their son Yakov. Stalin, who by now had established himself as "Georgia's leading Bolshevik", organised the June 1907 robbery of a bank stagecoach in Tiflis to fund the Bolsheviks. His operatives ambushed the convoy in Erivansky Square with guns and homemade bombs; around 40 people were killed. Stalin settled in Baku with his wife and son, where Mensheviks confronted him about the robbery and voted to expel him from the RSDLP, but he ignored them. Stalin secured Bolshevik domination of RSDLP branch and edited two Bolshevik newspapers. In November 1907, his wife died of typhus, and he left his son with her family in Tiflis. He then reassembled his gang, which attacked Black Hundreds and raised money through racketeering, counterfeiting, robberies and kidnapping the children of wealthy figures for ransom.

In March 1908, Stalin was arrested and imprisoned. He led the imprisoned Bolsheviks, organised discussion groups, and ordered the killing of suspected informants. He was sentenced to two years of exile in Solvychegodsk in northern Russia, arriving there in February 1909. In June, Stalin escaped to Saint Petersburg, but was arrested again in March 1910 and sent back to Solvychegodsk. In June 1911, Stalin was given permission to move to Vologda, where he stayed for two months. He then escaped to Saint Petersburg, where he was arrested again in September 1911 and sentenced to a further three years of exile in Vologda.

=== 1912–1917: Rise to the Central Committee and Pravda ===
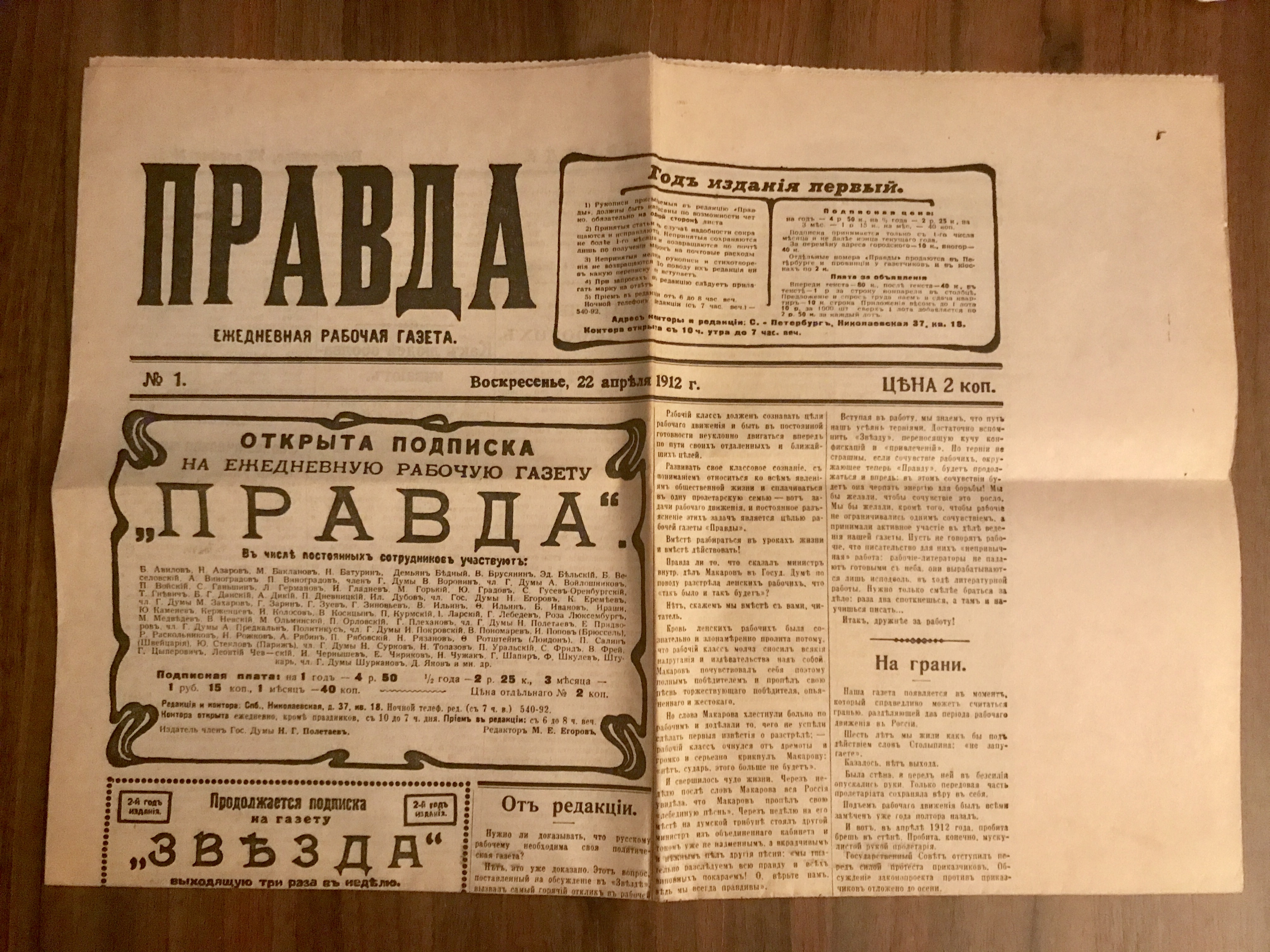
First issue of Pravda, of which Stalin served as an early editor

In January 1912, the first Bolshevik Central Committee was elected at the Prague Conference. Lenin and Grigory Zinoviev decided to co-opt Stalin to the committee, which Stalin (while still in exile in Vologda) agreed to. Lenin believed that Stalin, as a Georgian, would help secure support from the empire's minority ethnicities.

In February 1912, Stalin again escaped to Saint Petersburg, where he was tasked with converting the Bolshevik weekly newspaper, Zvezda ("Star") into a daily, Pravda ("Truth"). The new newspaper was launched in April 1912 and Stalin's role as editor was kept secret. In May 1912, he was again arrested and sentenced to three years of exile in Siberia. In July, he arrived in Narym, where he shared a room with fellow Bolshevik Yakov Sverdlov. After two months, they escaped to Saint Petersburg, where Stalin continued work on Pravda.

After the October 1912 Duma elections, Stalin wrote articles calling for reconciliation between the Bolsheviks and Mensheviks; Lenin criticised him and he relented. In January 1913, Stalin travelled incognito (using a false passport bearing the name "Stavros Papadopoulos") to Vienna, where he researched the "national question" of how the Bolsheviks should deal with the Empire's national and ethnic minorities. His article "Marxism and the National Question" was first published in the March, April, and May 1913 issues of the Bolshevik journal Prosveshcheniye under the pseudonym "K. Stalin". The alias, which he had used since 1912, is derived from the Russian for steel (stal), and has been translated as "Man of Steel". In February 1913, Stalin was again arrested in Saint Petersburg and sentenced to four years of exile in Turukhansk in Siberia, where he arrived in August. Still concerned over a potential escape, the authorities moved him to Kureika in March 1914.

=== 1917: Russian Revolution ===
While Stalin was in exile, Russia entered the First World War, and in October 1916 he and other exiled Bolsheviks were conscripted into the Russian Army. They arrived in Krasnoyarsk in February 1917, where a medical examiner ruled Stalin unfit for service due to his crippled arm. Stalin was required to serve four more months of his exile and successfully requested to serve it in Achinsk. Stalin was in the city when the February Revolution took place; the Tsar abdicated and the Empire became a de facto republic. In a celebratory mood, Stalin travelled by train to Petrograd (as Saint Petersburg had been renamed) in March. He assumed control of Pravda alongside Lev Kamenev, and was appointed as a Bolshevik delegate to the executive committee of the Petrograd Soviet, an influential workers' council.

The existing government of landlords and capitalists must be replaced by a new government, a government of workers and peasants.
The existing pseudo-government which was not elected by the people and which is not accountable to the people must be replaced by a government recognised by the people, elected by representatives of the workers, soldiers and peasants and held accountable to their representatives.

— Stalin's editorial in Pravda, October 1917

Stalin helped organise the July Days uprising, an armed display of strength by supporters of the Bolsheviks. After the demonstration was suppressed, the Provisional Government initiated a crackdown on the party, raiding Pravda. Stalin smuggled Lenin out of the paper's office and took charge of his safety, moving him between Petrograd safe houses before smuggling him to nearby Razliv. In Lenin's absence, Stalin continued editing Pravda and served as acting leader of the Bolsheviks, overseeing the party's Sixth Congress. Lenin began calling for the Bolsheviks to seize power by toppling the Provisional Government, a plan which was supported by Stalin and fellow senior Bolshevik Leon Trotsky, but opposed by Kamenev, Zinoviev, and other members.

On 24 October, police raided the Bolshevik newspaper offices, smashing machinery and presses; Stalin salvaged some of the equipment. In the early hours of 25 October, Stalin joined Lenin in a Central Committee meeting in Petrograd's Smolny Institute, from where the Bolshevik coup—the October Revolution—was directed. Bolshevik militia seized Petrograd's power station, main post office, state bank, telephone exchange, and several bridges. A Bolshevik-controlled ship, the Aurora, opened fire on the Winter Palace; the Provisional Government's assembled delegates surrendered and were arrested. Stalin, who had been tasked with briefing the Bolshevik delegates of the Second Congress of Soviets about the situation, had not played a publicly visible role. Trotsky and other later opponents used this as evidence his role had been insignificant, although various historians reject this, placing great significance in his role as a member of the Central Committee and as an editor of Pravda. However, according to the Russian historian Oleg Khlevni͡uk, 2015, "Russia was not allowed to follow the course of reform long enough to yield [significant] results", citing Stalin's frequent abuse of power and mis-directing the course of the Revolution.

== In Lenin's government ==
=== 1917–1918: People's Commissar for Nationalities ===
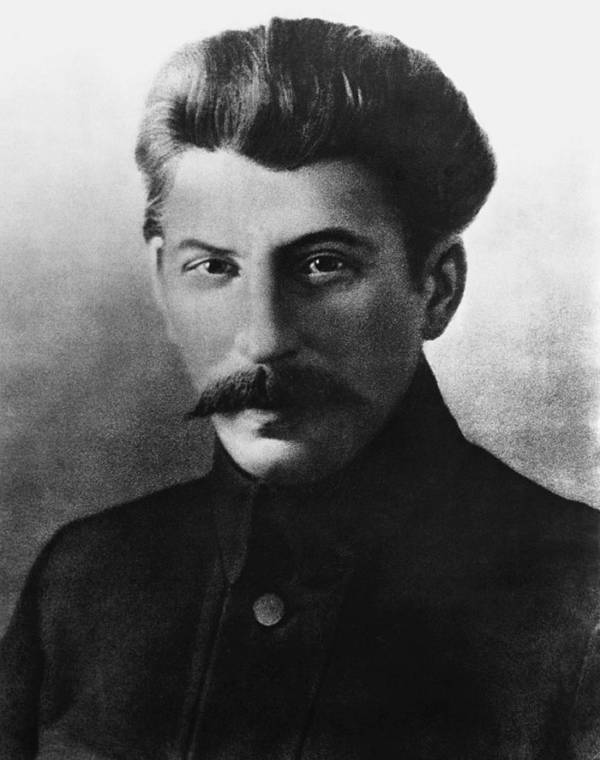
Stalin in 1917 as a young People's Commissar

On 26 October 1917, Lenin declared himself chairman of the new government, the Council of People's Commissars (Sovnarkom). Stalin supported Lenin's decision not to form a coalition with the Socialist Revolutionary Party. He became part of an informal leadership group alongside Lenin, Trotsky, and Sverdlov, and his importance within the Bolshevik ranks grew. Stalin's office was near Lenin's in the Smolny Institute, and he and Trotsky had direct access to Lenin without an appointment. Stalin co-signed Lenin's decrees shutting down hostile newspapers, and co-chaired the committee drafting a constitution for the Russian Soviet Federative Socialist Republic. He supported Lenin's formation of the Cheka security service and the Red Terror, arguing that state violence was an effective tool for capitalist powers. Unlike some Bolsheviks, Stalin never expressed concern about the Cheka's rapid expansion and the Red Terror.

Having left his role as Pravda editor, Stalin was appointed the People's Commissar for Nationalities. He appointed Nadezhda Alliluyeva as his secretary, and married her in early 1919. In November 1917, he signed the Decree on Nationality, granting ethnic minorities the right to secession and self-determination. He travelled to Helsinki to meet with the Finnish Social Democrats, and granted Finland's request for independence from Russia in December. Due to the threats posed by the First World War, in March 1918 the government relocated from Petrograd to the Moscow Kremlin. Stalin supported Lenin's desire to sign an armistice with the Central Powers; Stalin thought this necessary because he—unlike Lenin—was unconvinced that Europe was on the verge of proletarian revolution. The Treaty of Brest-Litovsk was signed in March 1918, ceding vast territories and angering many; the Left Socialist-Revolutionaries withdrew from the coalition government. The Bolsheviks were renamed the Russian Communist Party.

=== 1918–1921: Military command ===
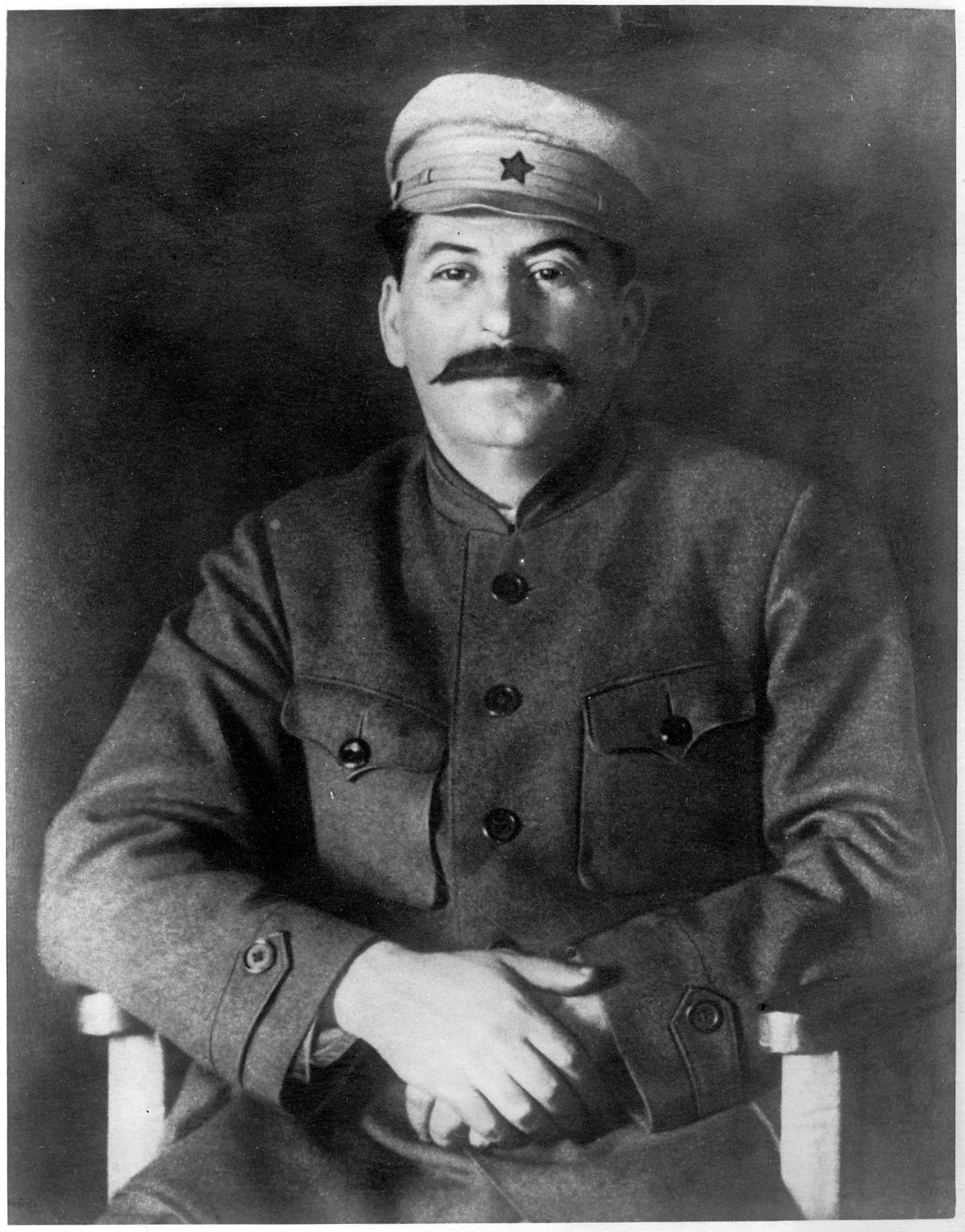
Stalin in 1920

In May 1918, during the intensifying Russian Civil War, Sovnarkom sent Stalin to Tsaritsyn to take charge of food procurement in Southern Russia. Eager to prove himself as a commander, he took control of regional military operations and befriended Kliment Voroshilov and Semyon Budyonny, who later formed the core of his military support base. Stalin sent large numbers of Red Army troops to battle the region's White armies, resulting in heavy losses and drawing Lenin's concern. In Tsaritsyn, Stalin commanded the local Cheka branch to execute suspected counter-revolutionaries, often without trial, and purged the military and food collection agencies of middle-class specialists, who were also executed. His use of state violence was at a greater scale than most Bolshevik leaders approved of, for instance, he ordered several villages torched to ensure compliance with his food procurement program.

In December 1918, Stalin was sent to Perm to lead an inquiry into how Alexander Kolchak's White forces had been able to decimate Red troops there. He returned to Moscow in January 1919, before being assigned to the Western Front at Petrograd. When the Red Third Regiment defected, he ordered the public execution of captured defectors. In September he returned to the Southern Front. During the war, Stalin proved his worth to the Central Committee by displaying decisiveness and determination. However, he also disregarded orders and repeatedly threatened to resign when affronted. In November 1919, the government awarded him the Order of the Red Banner for his service.

The Bolsheviks won the main phase of the civil war by the end of 1919. By that time, Sovnarkom had turned its attention to spreading proletarian revolution abroad, forming the Communist International in March 1919; Stalin attended its inaugural ceremony. Although Stalin did not share Lenin's belief that Europe's proletariat were on the verge of revolution, he acknowledged that Soviet Russia remained vulnerable. In February 1920, he was appointed to head the Workers' and Peasants' Inspectorate (Rabkrin); that same month he was also transferred to the Caucasian Front.

The Polish–Soviet War broke out in early 1920, with the Poles invading Ukraine, and in May, Stalin was moved to the Southwest Front. Lenin believed that the Polish proletariat would rise up to support an invasion, but Stalin argued that nationalism would lead them to support their government's war effort. Stalin lost the argument and accepted Lenin's decision. On his front, Stalin became determined to conquer Lvov; in focusing on this goal, he disobeyed orders to transfer his troops to assist Mikhail Tukhachevsky's forces at the Battle of Warsaw in early August, which ended in a major defeat for the Red Army. Stalin then returned to Moscow, where Tukhachevsky blamed him for the loss. Humiliated, he demanded demission from the military, which was granted on 1 September. At the 9th Party Congress in late September, Trotsky accused Stalin of "strategic mistakes" and claimed that he had sabotaged the campaign; Lenin joined in the criticism. Stalin felt disgraced and his antipathy toward Trotsky increased.

=== 1921–1924: Lenin's final years ===
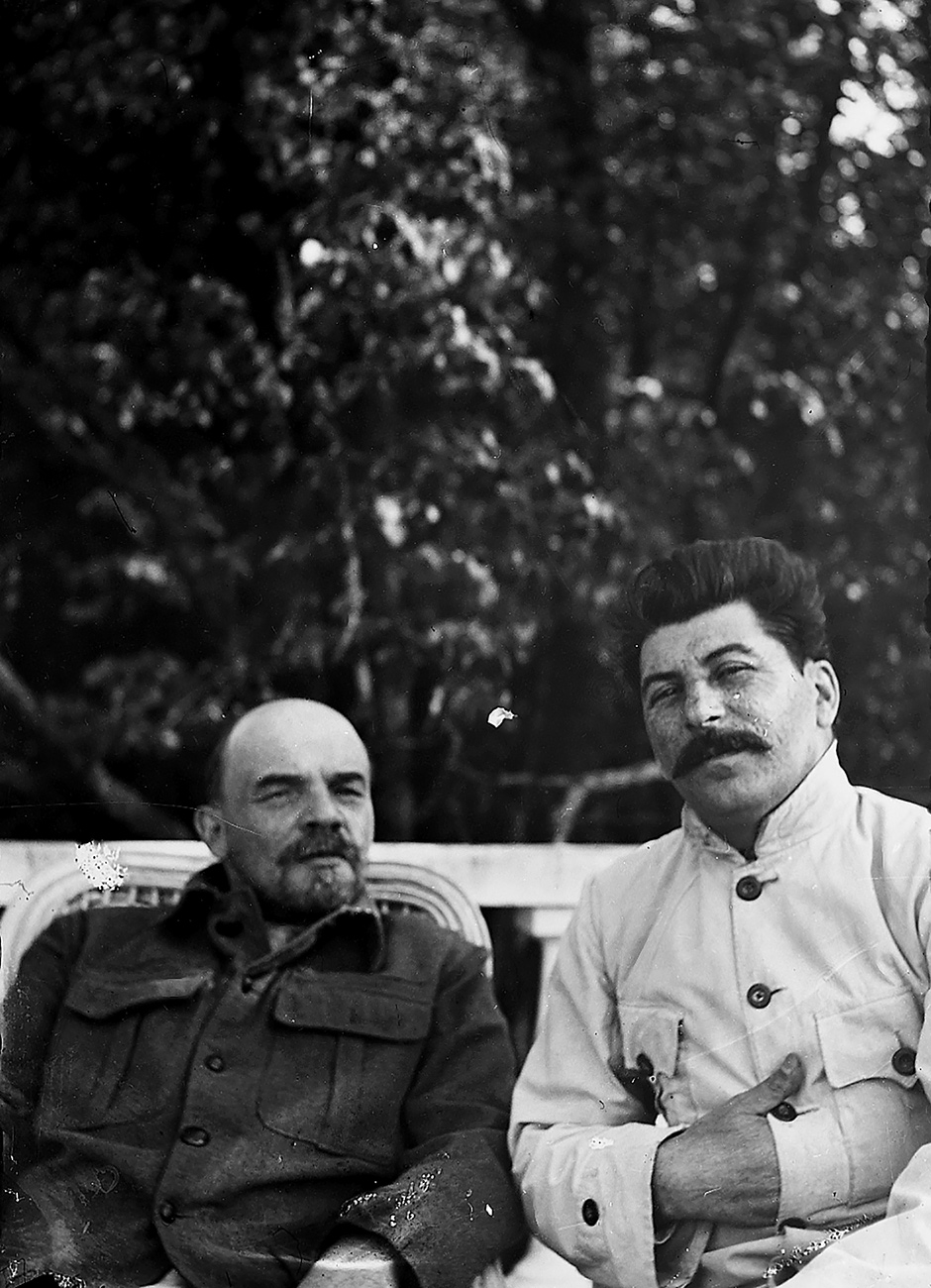
Stalin visiting Lenin at the Gorki dacha, just outside Moscow, September 1922

The Soviet government sought to bring neighbouring states under its domination; in February 1921 it invaded the Menshevik-governed Georgia, and in April 1921, Stalin ordered the Red Army into Turkestan to reassert Soviet control. As People's Commissar for Nationalities, Stalin believed that each ethnic group had the right to an "autonomous republic" within the Russian state in which it could oversee various regional affairs. In taking this view, some Marxists accused him of bending too much to bourgeois nationalism, while others accused him of remaining too Russo-centric. In his diverse native Caucasus, however, Stalin opposed the idea of separate autonomous republics, arguing that these would oppress ethnic minorities within their territories; instead, he called for a Transcaucasian Socialist Federative Soviet Republic. The Georgian Communist Party opposed the idea, resulting in the Georgian affair. In mid-1921, Stalin returned to the South Caucasus, calling on Georgian communists to reject the chauvinistic nationalism which he argued had marginalised the Abkhazian, Ossetian, and Adjarian minorities. In March 1921, Nadezhda gave birth to another of Stalin's sons, Vasily.

After the civil war, workers' strikes and peasant uprisings broke out across Russia in opposition to Sovnarkom's food requisitioning project; in response, Lenin introduced market-oriented reforms in the New Economic Policy (NEP). There was also turmoil within the Communist Party, as Trotsky led a faction calling for abolition of trade unions; Lenin opposed this, and Stalin helped rally opposition to Trotsky's position. At the 11th Party Congress in March and April 1922, Lenin nominated Stalin as the party's General Secretary, which was intended as a purely organisational role. Although concerns were expressed that adopting the new position would overstretch his workload and grant him too much power, Stalin was appointed to the post.

As historian James Harris has observed, the position of General Secretary during the early 1920s has unfortunately been caricatured in the literature — "it did not give Stalin the power to put his cronies in power," he notes. Rather, it was regarded as a dirty job, in which

"The General Secretary had to establish a system that tracked the skills and experience of hundreds of thousands of officials; that reported on the fulfillment of decisions; that identified weak and failing organizations and sorted their problems; that raised the qualifications of officials and distributed them to where they were most needed.... Stalin had to organize 350,000 mostly poorly qualified, if not wholly unqualified (and largely semi-literate) 'staff,' who together had to bring the world's largest country, with a population of almost 140 million, out of an appalling economic crisis amidst serious political divisions."

Stalin thus gradually gained authority and power, Harris argues, not merely through conniving Machivellian political tricks, but through plaudits earned for having brought "a semblance of order to a chaotic system."

Stalin is too crude, and this defect which is entirely acceptable in our milieu and in relationships among us as communists, becomes unacceptable in the position of General Secretary. I therefore propose to comrades that they should devise a means of removing him from this job and should appoint to this job someone else who is distinguished from comrade Stalin in all other respects only by the single superior aspect that he should be more tolerant, more polite and more attentive towards comrades, less capricious, etc.

— Lenin's Testament, 4 January 1923

In May 1922, a massive stroke left Lenin partially paralysed. Residing at his Gorki dacha, his main connection to Sovnarkom was through Stalin. Despite their comradeship, Lenin disliked what he referred to as Stalin's "Asiatic" manner and told his sister Maria that Stalin was "not intelligent". The two men argued on the issue of foreign trade; Lenin believed that the Soviet state should have a monopoly on foreign trade, but Stalin supported Grigori Sokolnikov's view that doing so was impractical.

Another disagreement came over the Georgian affair, with Lenin backing the Georgian Central Committee's desire for a Georgian Soviet Republic over Stalin's idea of a Transcaucasian one. They also disagreed on the nature of the Soviet state; Lenin called for establishment of a new federation named the "Union of Soviet Republics of Europe and Asia", while Stalin believed that this would encourage independence sentiment among non-Russians. Lenin accused Stalin of "Great Russian chauvinism", while Stalin accused Lenin of "national liberalism". A compromise was reached in which the federation would be named the "Union of Soviet Socialist Republics" (USSR), whose formation was ratified in December 1922.

Their differences also became personal; Lenin was angered when Stalin was rude to his wife Krupskaya during a telephone conversation. In the final years of his life, Krupskaya provided leading figures with Lenin's Testament, which criticised Stalin's rude manners and excessive power and suggested that he be removed as general secretary. Some historians have questioned whether Lenin wrote the document, suggesting that it was written by Krupskaya; Stalin never publicly voiced concerns about its authenticity. Most historians consider it an accurate reflection of Lenin's views.

== Consolidation of power ==
=== 1924–1928: Succeeding Lenin ===
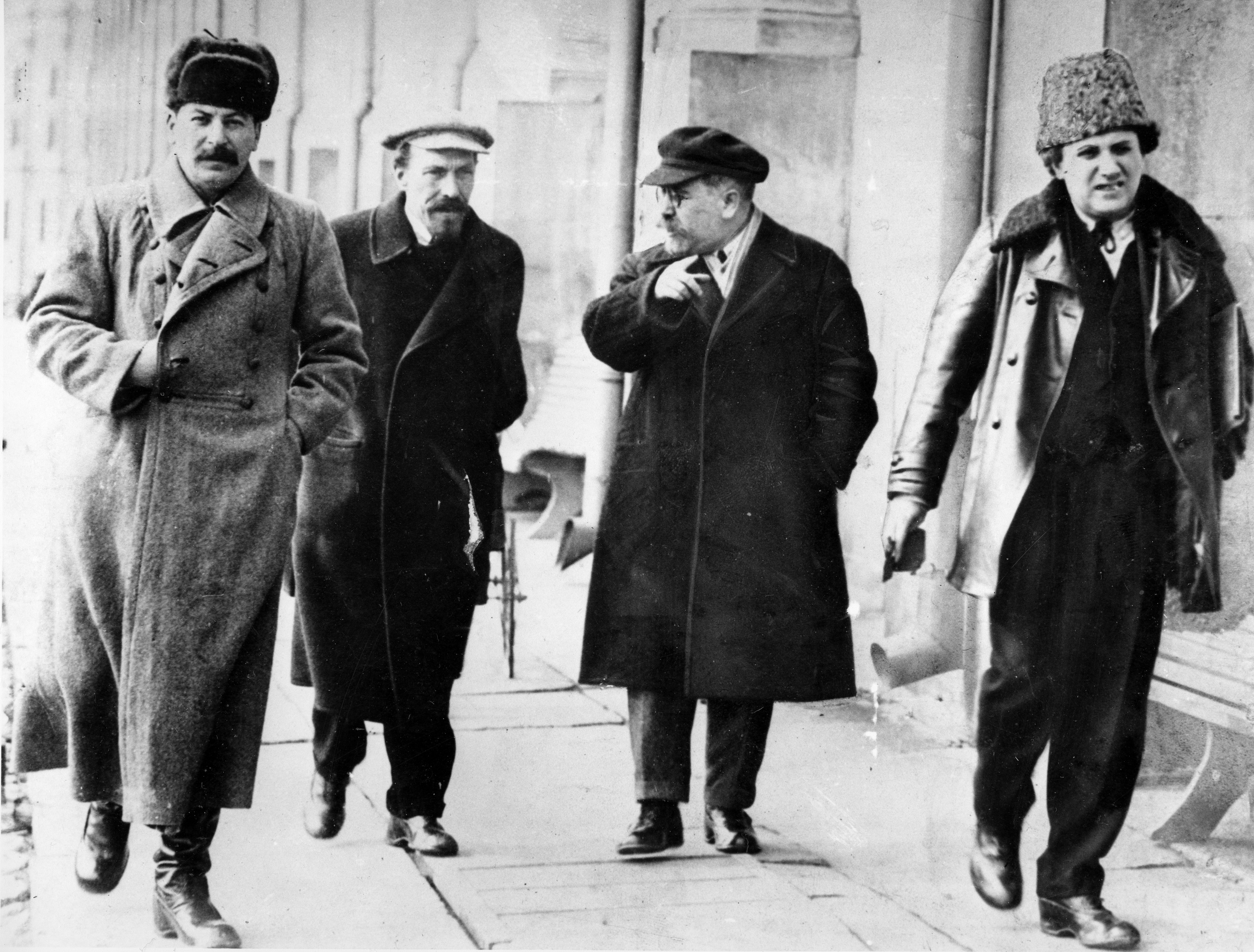
From left to right: Stalin, Alexei Rykov, Lev Kamenev, and Grigory Zinoviev in 1925. All three later fell out with Stalin and were executed during the Great Purge.

Upon Lenin's death in January 1924, Stalin took charge of the funeral and was a pallbearer. To bolster his image as a devoted Leninist amid his growing personality cult, Stalin gave nine lectures at Sverdlov University on the Foundations of Leninism, later published in book form. At the 13th Party Congress in May 1924, Lenin's Testament was read only to the leaders of the provincial delegations. Embarrassed by its contents, Stalin offered his resignation as General Secretary; this act of humility saved him, and he was retained in the post.

As General Secretary, Stalin had a free hand in making appointments to his own staff, and implanted loyalists throughout the party. Favouring new members from proletarian backgrounds to "Old Bolsheviks", who tended to be middle-class university graduates, he ensured that he had loyalists dispersed across the regions. Stalin had much contact with young party functionaries, and the desire for promotion led many to seek his favour. Stalin also developed close relations with key figures in the secret police: Felix Dzerzhinsky, Genrikh Yagoda, and Vyacheslav Menzhinsky. His wife gave birth to a daughter, Svetlana, in February 1926.

In the wake of Lenin's death, a power struggle emerged to become his successor: alongside Stalin was Trotsky, Zinoviev, Kamenev, Nikolai Bukharin, Alexei Rykov, and Mikhail Tomsky. Stalin saw Trotsky—whom he personally despised—as the main obstacle to his dominance, and during Lenin's illness had formed an unofficial triumvirate (troika) alongside Kamenev and Zinoviev. Although Zinoviev was concerned about Stalin's growing power, he rallied behind him at the 13th Congress as a counterweight to Trotsky, who now led a faction known as the Left Opposition. Trotsky's supporters believed that the NEP conceded too much to capitalism, and they called Stalin a "rightist" for his support of the policy. Stalin built up a retinue of his supporters within the Central Committee as the Left Opposition were marginalised.

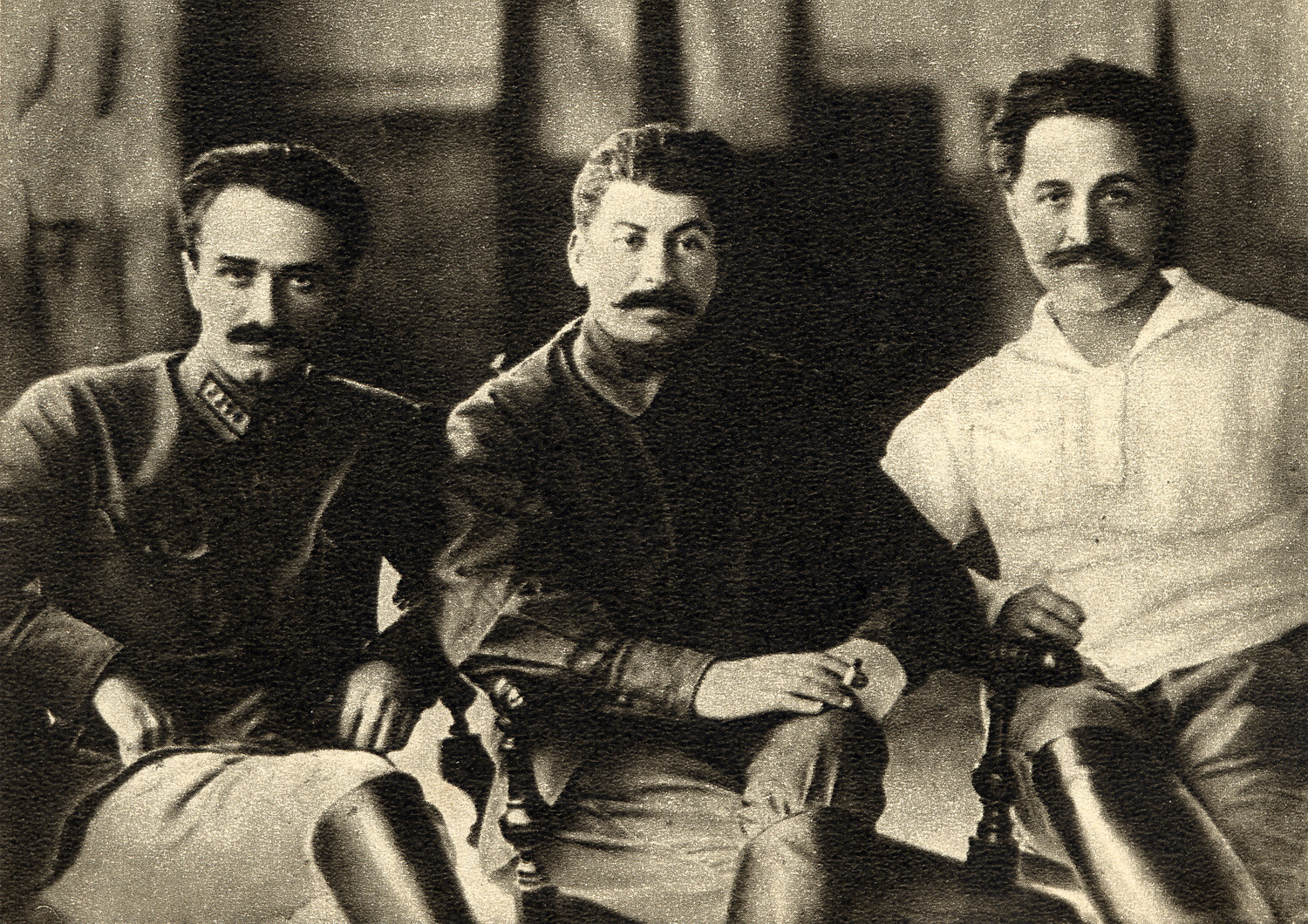
Stalin and his close associates Anastas Mikoyan and Sergo Ordzhonikidze in Tbilisi, 1925

In late 1924, Stalin moved against Kamenev and Zinoviev, removing their supporters from key positions. In 1925, the two moved into open opposition to Stalin and Bukharin and launched an unsuccessful attack on their faction at the 14th Party Congress in December. Stalin accused Kamenev and Zinoviev of reintroducing factionalism, and thus instability. In mid-1926, Kamenev and Zinoviev joined with Trotsky to form the United Opposition against Stalin, and in October they agreed to stop factional activity under threat of expulsion, and later publicly recanted their views. The factionalist arguments continued, with Stalin threatening to resign in October and December 1926, and again in December 1927. In October 1927, Trotsky was removed from the Central Committee; he was later exiled to Kazakhstan in 1928 and deported from the country in 1929.

Stalin was now the supreme leader of the party and state. He entrusted the position of head of government to Vyacheslav Molotov; other important supporters on the Politburo were Voroshilov, Lazar Kaganovich, and Sergo Ordzhonikidze, with Stalin ensuring his allies ran state institutions. His growing influence was reflected in naming of locations after him; in June 1924 the Ukrainian city of Yuzovka became Stalino, and in April 1925, Tsaritsyn was renamed Stalingrad. In 1926, Stalin published On Questions of Leninism, in which he argued for the concept of "socialism in one country", which was presented as an orthodox Leninist perspective despite clashing with established Bolshevik views that socialism could only be achieved globally through the process of world revolution. In 1927, there was some argument in the party over Soviet policy regarding China. Stalin had called for the Chinese Communist Party (CCP), led by Mao Zedong, to ally itself with Chiang Kai-shek's Kuomintang (KMT) nationalists, viewing a CCP-KMT alliance as the best bulwark against Japanese imperialism. Instead, the KMT repressed the CCP and a civil war broke out between the two sides.

=== 1928–1932: First five-year plan ===
==== Economic policy ====
We have fallen behind the advanced countries by fifty to a hundred years. We must close that gap in ten years. Either we do this or we'll be crushed.

This is what our obligations before the workers and peasants of the USSR dictate to us.

— Stalin, February 1931

The Soviet Union lagged far behind the industrial and agricultural development of the Western powers. Stalin's government feared attack from capitalist countries, and many communists, including in Komsomol, OGPU, and the Red Army, were eager to be rid of the NEP and its market-oriented approach. They had concerns about those who profited from the policy: affluent peasants known as "kulaks" and small business owners, or "NEPmen". At this point, Stalin turned against the NEP, which put him on a course to the "left" even of Trotsky or Zinoviev.

In early 1928, Stalin travelled to Novosibirsk, where he alleged that kulaks were hoarding grain and ordered them be arrested and their grain confiscated, with Stalin bringing much of the grain back to Moscow with him in February. At his command, grain procurement squads surfaced across West Siberia and the Urals, with violence breaking out between the squads and the peasantry. Stalin announced that kulaks and the "middle peasants" must be coerced into releasing their harvest. Bukharin and other Central Committee members were angered that they had not been consulted about the measure. In January 1930, the Politburo approved the "liquidation" of the kulak class, which was exiled to other parts of the country or concentration camps. By July 1930, over 320,000 households had been affected. According to Dmitri Volkogonov, dekulakisation was "the first mass terror applied by Stalin in his own country."

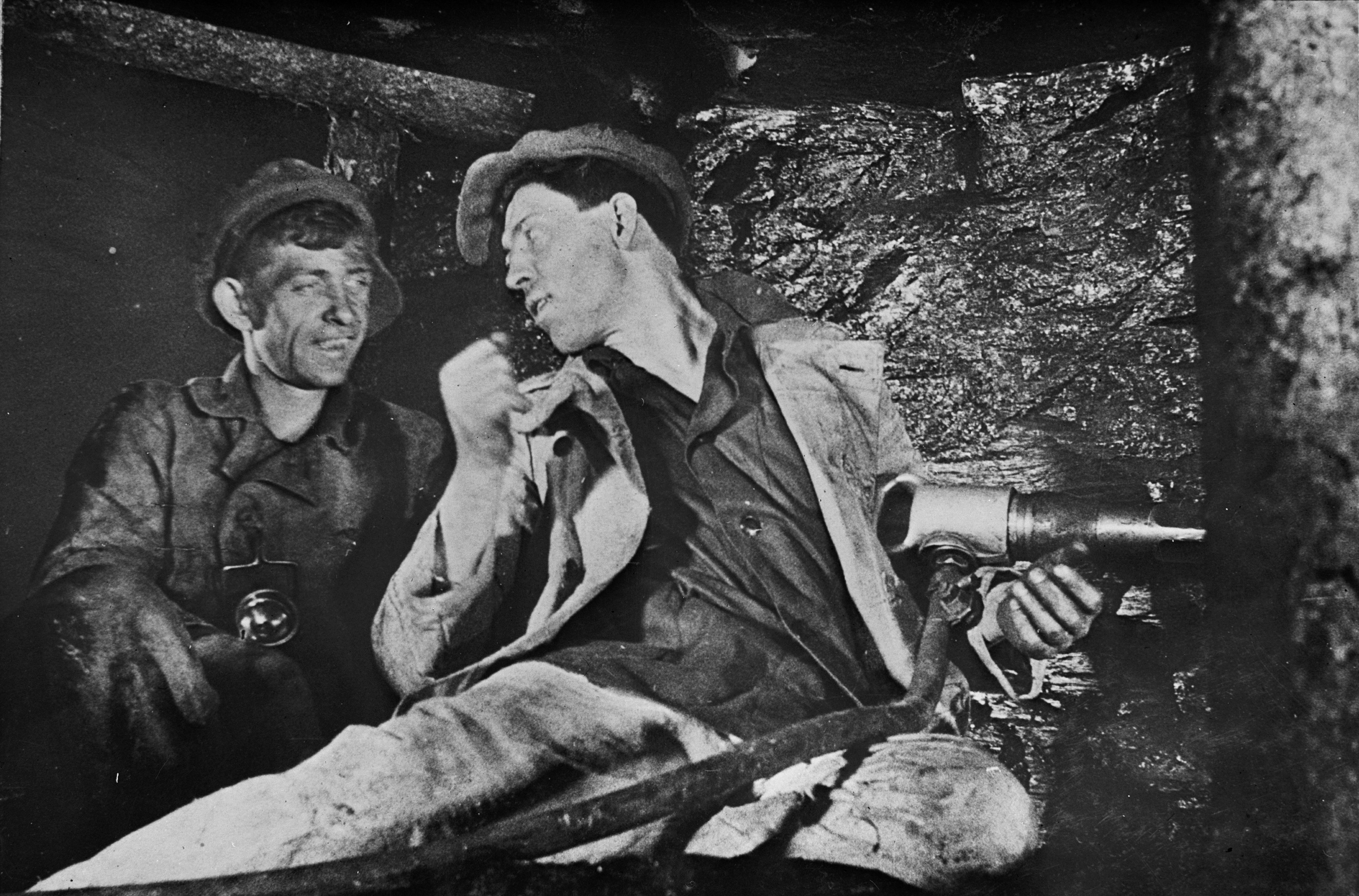
Aleksei Stakhanov with a fellow miner. Stalin's government initiated the Stakhanovite movement in order to encourage hard work.

In 1929, the Politburo announced the mass collectivisation of agriculture, establishing both kolkhoz collective farms and sovkhoz state farms. Although officially voluntary, many peasants joined the collectives out of fear they would face the fate of the kulaks. By 1932, about 62% of households involved in agriculture were part of collectives, and by 1936 this had risen to 90%. Many collectivised peasants resented the loss of their private farmland, and productivity slumped. Famine broke out in many areas, with the Politburo frequently being forced to dispatch emergency food relief. Armed peasant uprisings broke out in Ukraine, the North Caucasus, Southern Russia, and Central Asia, reaching their apex in March 1930; these were suppressed by the army. Stalin responded with an article insisting that collectivisation was voluntary and blaming violence on local officials. Although he and Stalin had been close for many years, Bukharin expressed concerns and regarded them as a return to Lenin's old "war communism" policy. By mid-1928, he was unable to rally sufficient support in the party to oppose the reforms; in November 1929, Stalin removed him from the Politburo.

Officially, the Soviet Union had replaced the "irrationality" and "wastefulness" of a market economy with a planned economy organised along a long-term and scientific framework; in reality, Soviet economics were based on ad hoc commandments issued often to make short-term targets. In 1928, the first five-year plan was launched by Stalin with a main focus on boosting Soviet heavy industry; it was finished a year ahead of schedule, in 1932. The country underwent a massive economic transformation: new mines were opened, new cities like Magnitogorsk constructed, and work on the White Sea–Baltic Canal began. Millions of peasants moved to the cities, and large debts were accrued purchasing foreign-made machinery.

Many major construction projects, including the White Sea–Baltic Canal and the Moscow Metro, were constructed largely through forced labour. The last elements of workers' control over industry were removed, with factory managers receiving privileges; Stalin defended wage disparity by pointing to Marx's argument that it was necessary during the lower stages of socialism. To promote intensification of labour, medals and awards as well as the Stakhanovite movement were introduced. Stalin argued that socialism was being established in the USSR while capitalism was crumbling during the Great Depression. His rhetoric reflected his utopian vision of the "new Soviet person" rising to unparallelled heights of human development.

==== Cultural and foreign policy ====
In 1928, Stalin declared that class war between the proletariat and their enemies would intensify as socialism developed. He warned of a "danger from the right", including from within the Communist Party. The first major show trial in the USSR was the Shakhty Trial of 1928, in which middle-class "industrial specialists" were convicted of sabotage. From 1929 to 1930, show trials were held to intimidate opposition; these included the Industrial Party Trial, Menshevik Trial, and Metro-Vickers Trial. Aware that the ethnic Russian majority may have concerns about being ruled by a Georgian, he promoted ethnic Russians throughout the state bureaucracy and made Russian compulsory in schools, albeit in tandem with local languages. Nationalist sentiment was suppressed. Conservative social policies were promoted to boost population growth; this included a focus on strong family units, re-criminalisation of homosexuality, restrictions on abortion and divorce, and abolition of the Zhenotdel women's department.

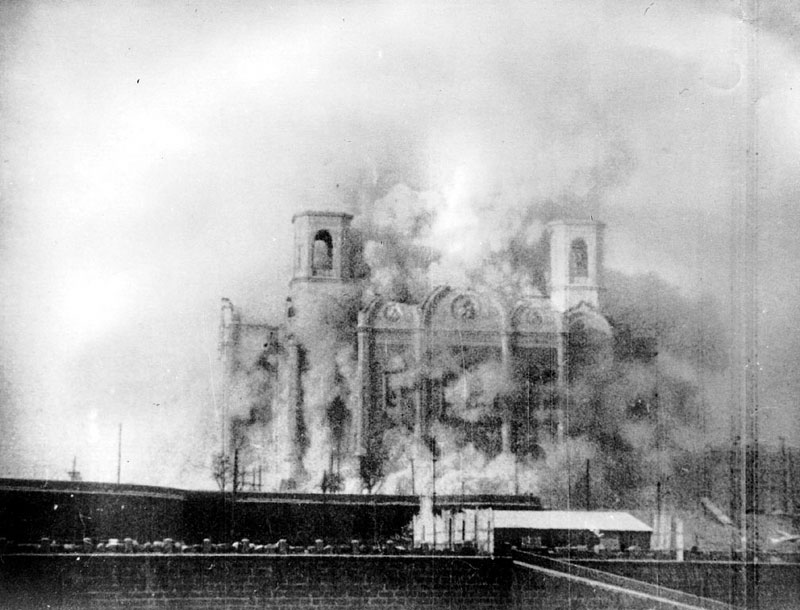
1931 demolition of the Cathedral of Christ the Saviour in Moscow in order to make way for the planned Palace of the Soviets

Stalin desired a "cultural revolution", entailing both the creation of a culture for the "masses" and the wider dissemination of previously elite culture. He oversaw a proliferation of schools, newspapers, and libraries, as well as advancement of literacy and numeracy. Socialist realism was promoted throughout the arts, while Stalin wooed prominent writers, namely Maxim Gorky, Mikhail Sholokhov, and Aleksey Nikolayevich Tolstoy. He expressed patronage for scientists whose research fit within his preconceived interpretation of Marxism; for instance, he endorsed the research of agrobiologist Trofim Lysenko despite the fact that it was rejected by the majority of Lysenko's scientific peers as pseudo-scientific. The government's anti-religious campaign was re-intensified, with increased funding given to the League of Militant Atheists. Priests, imams, and Buddhist monks faced persecution. Religious buildings were demolished, most notably Moscow's Cathedral of Christ the Saviour, destroyed in 1931 to make way for the Palace of the Soviets. Religion retained an influence over the population; in the 1937 census, 57% of respondents were willing to admit to being religious.

Throughout the 1920s, Stalin placed a priority on foreign policy. He personally met with a range of Western visitors, including George Bernard Shaw and H. G. Wells, both of whom were impressed with him. Through the Communist International, Stalin's government exerted a strong influence over Marxist parties elsewhere; he left the running of the organisation to Bukharin before his ousting. At its 6th Congress in July 1928, Stalin informed delegates that the main threat to socialism came from non-Marxist socialists and social democrats, whom he called "social fascists"; Stalin recognised that in many countries, these groups were Marxist–Leninists' main rivals for working-class support. This focus on opposing rival leftists concerned Bukharin, who regarded the growth of fascism and the far right across Europe as a greater threat.

In 1929, Stalin's son Yakov unsuccessfully attempted suicide, shooting himself in the chest and narrowly missing his heart; his failure earned the contempt of Stalin, who is reported to have brushed off the attempt by saying "He can't even shoot straight." His relationship with Nadezhda was strained amid their arguments and her mental health problems. In November 1932, after a group dinner in the Kremlin in which Stalin flirted with other women, Nadezhda shot herself in the heart. Publicly, the cause of death was given as appendicitis; Stalin also concealed the real cause of death from his children. Stalin's friends noted that he underwent a significant change following her suicide, becoming emotionally harder.

=== 1932–1939: Major crises ===
==== Famine of 1932–1933 ====
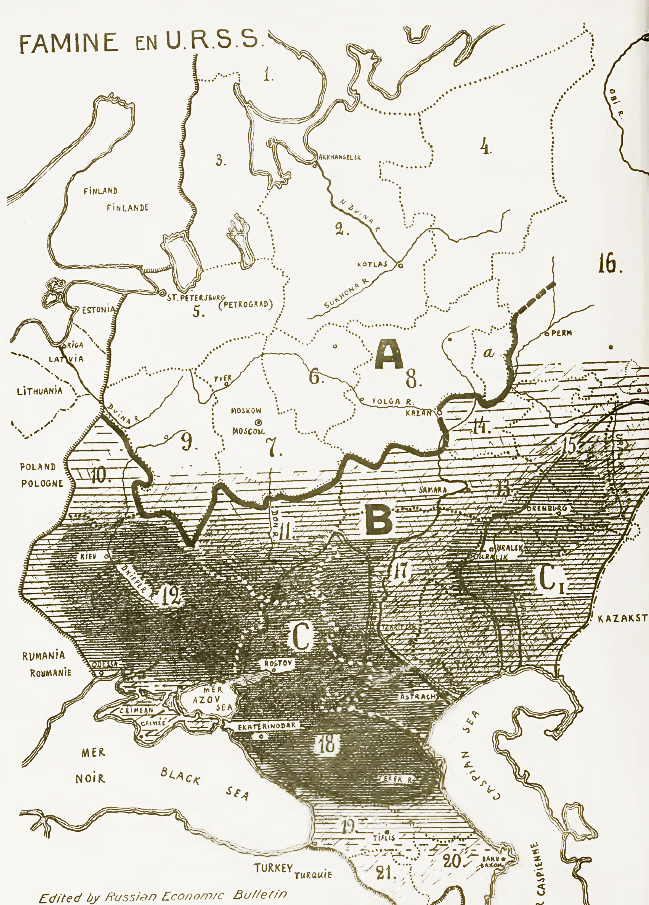
Areas affected by the Soviet famine of 1932–1933

Within the Soviet Union, civic disgruntlement against Stalin's government was widespread. Social unrest in urban areas led Stalin to ease some economic policies in 1932. In May 1932, he introduced kolkhoz markets where peasants could trade surplus produce. However, penal sanctions became harsher; a decree in August 1932 made the theft of a handful of grain a capital offence. The second five-year plan reduced production quotas from the first, focusing more on improving living conditions through housing and consumer goods. Emphasis on armament production increased after Adolf Hitler became German chancellor in 1933.

The Soviet Union experienced a major famine which peaked in the winter of 1932–1933, with 5–7 million deaths. The worst affected areas were Ukraine (where the famine was called the Holodomor), Southern Russia, Kazakhstan and the North Caucasus. In the case of Ukraine, historians debate whether the famine was intentional, with the purpose of eliminating a potential independence movement; no documents show Stalin explicitly ordered starvation. Poor weather led to bad harvests in 1931 and 1932, compounded by years of declining productivity. Rapid industrialisation policies, neglect of crop rotation, and failure to build reserve grain stocks exacerbated the crisis. Stalin blamed hostile elements and saboteurs among the peasants. The government provided limited food aid to famine-stricken areas, prioritising urban workers; for Stalin, Soviet industrialisation was more valuable than peasant lives. Grain exports declined heavily. Stalin did not acknowledge his policies' role in the famine, which was concealed from foreign observers.

==== Ideological and foreign affairs ====
In 1936, Stalin oversaw the adoption of a new constitution with expansive democratic features; it was designed as propaganda, as all power rested in his hands. He declared that "socialism, the first phase of communism, has been achieved". In 1938, the History of the Communist Party of the Soviet Union (Bolsheviks) was released; commonly known as the "Short Course", it became the central text of Stalinism. Authorised Stalin biographies were also published, though Stalin preferred to be viewed as the embodiment of the Communist Party, rather than have his life story explored.

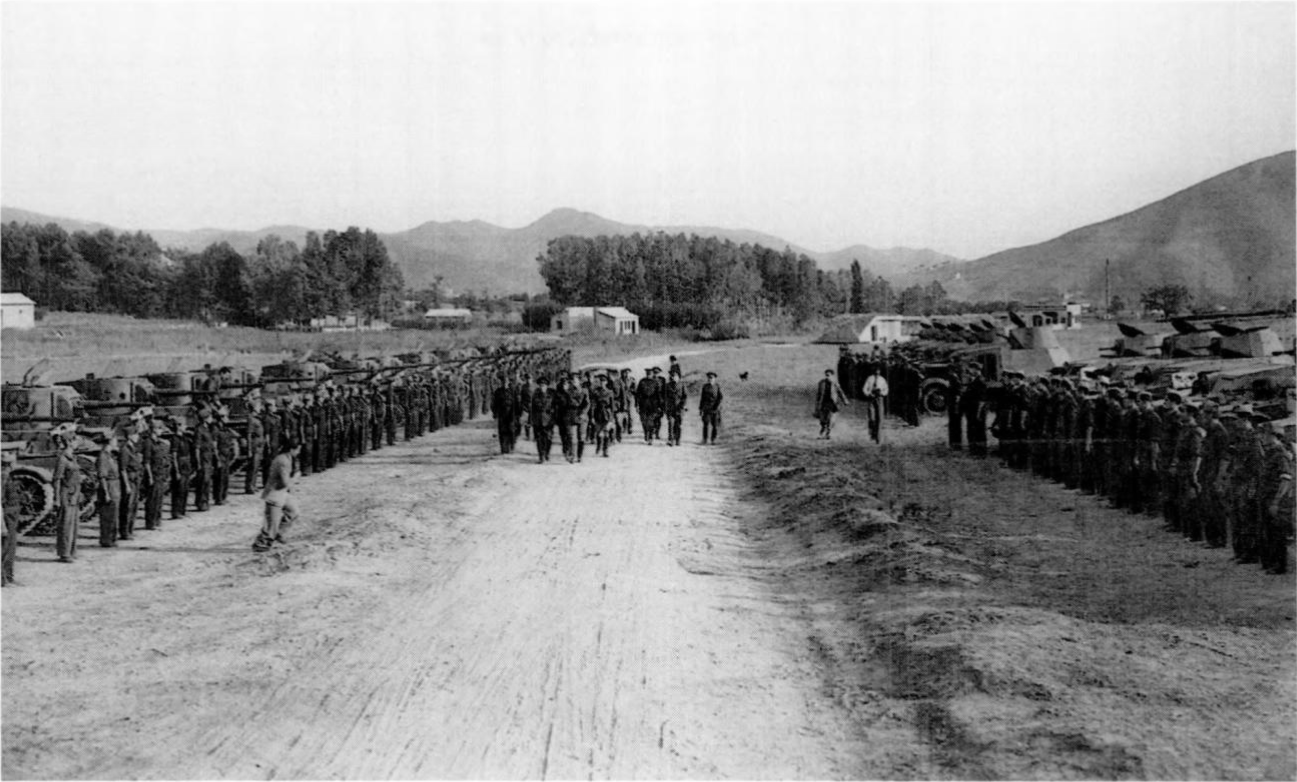
Review of Soviet armoured vehicles used to equip the Republican Army during the Spanish Civil War

Seeking better international relations, in 1934 the Soviet Union joined the League of Nations, from which it had previously been excluded. Stalin initiated confidential communications with Hitler in October 1933, shortly after the latter came to power. Stalin admired Hitler, particularly his manoeuvres to remove rivals within the Nazi Party in the Night of the Long Knives. Stalin nevertheless recognised the threat posed by fascism and sought to establish better links with the liberal democracies of Western Europe; in May 1935, the Soviets signed treaties of mutual assistance with France and Czechoslovakia. At the Communist International's 7th Congress in July–August 1935, the Soviet Union encouraged Marxist–Leninists to unite with other leftists as part of a popular front against fascism. In response, Germany, Italy, and Japan signed the Anti-Comintern Pact.

When the Spanish Civil War broke out in July 1936, the Soviets sent military aid to the Republican faction, including 648 aircraft and 407 tanks, along with 3,000 Soviet troops and 42,000 members of the International Brigades. Stalin took a personal involvement in the Spanish situation. Germany and Italy backed the Nationalist faction, which was ultimately victorious in March 1939. With the outbreak of the Second Sino-Japanese War in July 1937, the Soviet Union and China signed a non-aggression pact. Stalin aided the Chinese as the KMT and the Communists suspended their civil war and formed his desired United Front against Japan.

==== Great Purge ====
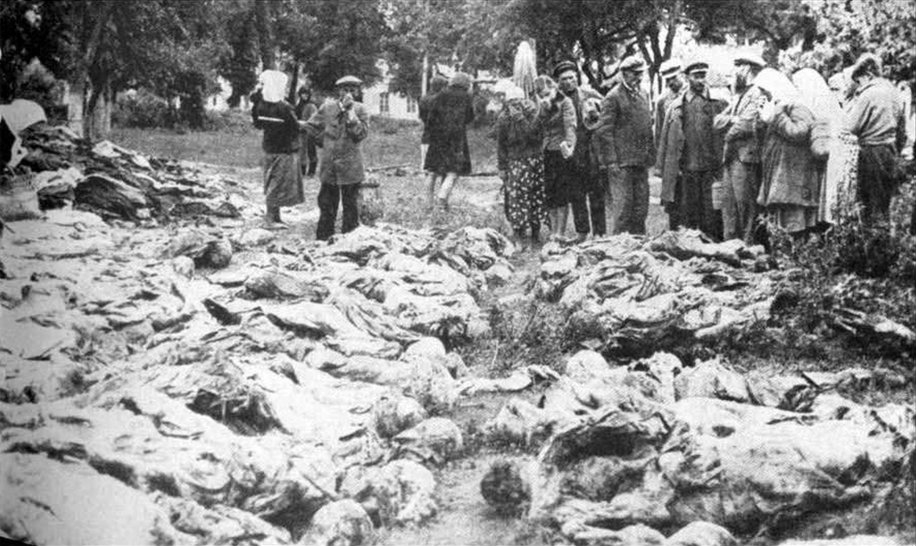
Exhumed mass grave of the Vinnytsia massacre, 1943

Stalin's approach to state repression was often contradictory. In May 1933, he released many convicted of minor offences, ordering the security services not to enact further mass arrests and deportations, and in September 1934, he launched a commission to investigate false imprisonments. That same month, he called for the execution of workers at the Stalin Metallurgical Factory accused of spying for Japan. During the 17th Congress of the Communist Party, Stalin was re-elected as a member of the Central Committee, by a vote of 1059 or 1225, with 166 ballots missing or 13.5% of those attending. After Sergei Kirov was murdered in December 1934, Stalin became increasingly concerned about assassination threats, and state repression intensified. Stalin issued a decree establishing NKVD troikas which could issue rapid and severe sentences without involving the courts. In 1935, he ordered the NKVD to expel suspected counterrevolutionaries from urban areas; over 11,000 were expelled from Leningrad alone in early 1935.

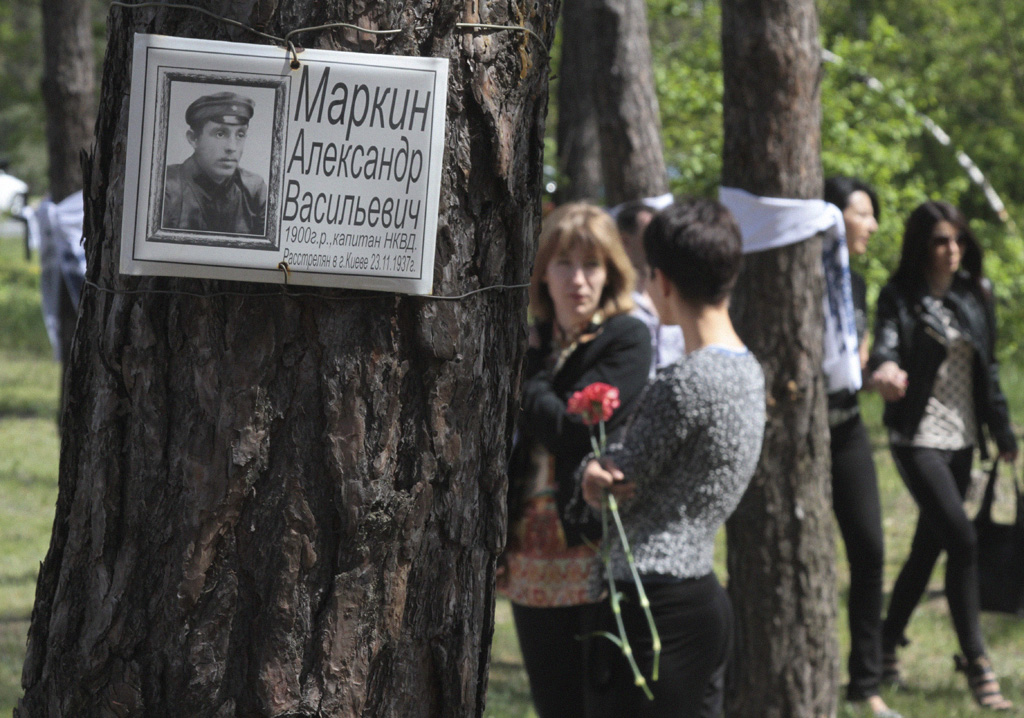
Memorial to a victim of the Great Purge at the Bykivnia mass grave

In 1936, Nikolai Yezhov became head of the NKVD, after which Stalin moved to orchestrate the arrest and execution of his remaining opponents in the Communist Party in the Great Purge. The first Moscow Trial in August 1936 saw Kamenev and Zinoviev executed. The second trial took place in January 1937, and the third in March 1938, with Bukharin and Rykov executed. By late 1937, all remnants of collective leadership were gone from the Politburo, which was now effectively under Stalin's control. There were mass expulsions from the party, with Stalin also ordering foreign communist parties to purge anti-Stalinist elements. These purges replaced most of the party's old guard with younger officials loyal to Stalin. Party functionaries readily carried out their commands and sought to ingratiate themselves with Stalin, to avoid becoming victims. Such functionaries often carried out more arrests and executions than their quotas set by government.

Repressions intensified further from December 1936 until November 1938. In May 1937, Stalin ordered the arrest of much of the army's high command, and mass arrests in the military followed. By late 1937, purges extended beyond the party to the wider population. In July 1937, the Politburo ordered a purge of "anti-Soviet elements", targeting anti-Stalin Bolsheviks, former Mensheviks, Socialist Revolutionaries, priests, ex–White Army soldiers, and common criminals. Stalin initiated "national operations", the ethnic cleansing of non-Soviet ethnic groups — among them Poles, Germans, Latvians, Finns, Greeks, Koreans, and Chinese — through internal or external exile. More than 1.6 million people were arrested, 700,000 shot, and an unknown number died under torture. The NKVD also assassinated defectors and opponents abroad; in August 1940, Trotsky was assassinated in Mexico, eliminating Stalin's last major opponent.

Stalin initiated all key decisions during the purge, and personally directed many operations. Historians debate his motives, noting his personal writings from the period were "unusually convoluted and incoherent", filled with claims about enemies encircling him. He feared a domestic fifth column in the event of war with Japan and Germany, particularly after right-wing forces overthrew the leftist Spanish government. The Great Purge ended when Yezhov was replaced by Lavrentiy Beria, a fellow Georgian completely loyal to Stalin. Yezhov himself was arrested in April 1939 and executed in 1940. The purge damaged the Soviet Union's reputation abroad, particularly among leftist sympathisers. As it wound down, Stalin sought to deflect his responsibility, blaming its "excesses" and "violations of law" on Yezhov.

== World War II ==
=== 1939–1941: The Pact with Nazi Germany ===
As a Marxist–Leninist, Stalin considered conflict between competing capitalist powers inevitable; after Nazi Germany annexed Austria and then part of Czechoslovakia in 1938, he recognised a major war was looming. He sought to maintain Soviet neutrality, hoping that a German war against France and the United Kingdom would lead to Soviet dominance in Europe. The Soviets faced a threat from the east, with Soviet troops clashing with the expansionist Japanese in the latter part of the 1930s, culminating in the Battles of Khalkhin Gol in 1939. Stalin initiated a military build-up, with the Red Army more than doubling between January 1939 and June 1941, although in haste many of its officers were poorly trained. Between 1940 and 1941, Stalin purged the military, leaving it with a severe shortage of trained officers when war eventually broke out.

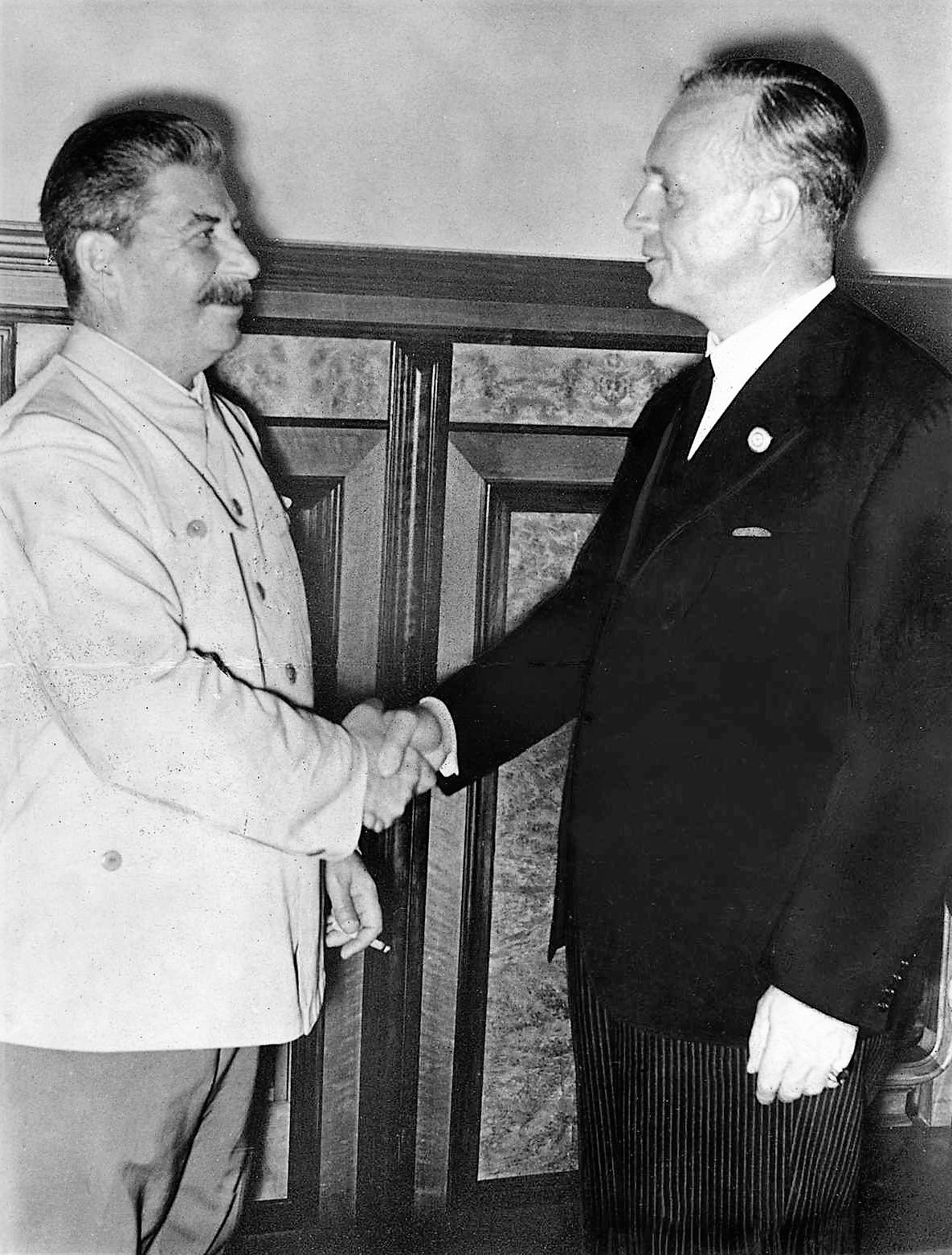
Stalin greeting German foreign minister Joachim von Ribbentrop at the Kremlin, August 1939

As Britain and France seemed unwilling to commit to an alliance with the Soviet Union, Stalin saw a better deal with the Germans. On 3 May 1939, he replaced his Western-oriented foreign minister Maxim Litvinov with Vyacheslav Molotov. Germany began negotiations with the Soviets, proposing that Eastern Europe be divided between the two powers. In August 1939, the Soviet Union signed the Molotov–Ribbentrop Pact with Germany, a non-aggression pact negotiated by Molotov and German foreign minister Joachim von Ribbentrop with a secret protocol dividing Eastern Europe. On 1 September, Germany invaded Poland, leading the UK and France to declare war on Germany. On 17 September, the Red Army entered eastern Poland, officially to restore order. On 28 September, Germany and the Soviet Union exchanged some of their conquered territories, and a German–Soviet Frontier Treaty was signed shortly after in Stalin's presence. The two states continued trading, undermining the British blockade of Germany.

The Soviets further demanded parts of eastern Finland, but the Finnish government refused. The Soviets invaded Finland in November 1939, starting the Winter War; despite numerical inferiority, the Finns kept the Red Army at bay. International opinion backed Finland, with the Soviet Union being expelled from the League of Nations. Embarrassed by their inability to defeat the Finns, the Soviets signed an interim peace treaty, in which they received territorial concessions. In June 1940, the Red Army occupied the Baltic states, which were annexed by Soviet Union in August; they also invaded and annexed Bessarabia and northern Bukovina, parts of Romania. The Soviets sought to prevent dissent in the newly occupied territories with mass repressions. A notable instance was the Katyn massacre of April and May 1940, in which around 22,000 people, mainly consisting of Polish intellectuals, members of the Polish Armed Forces, and members of the Polish State Police, were executed by the NKVD.

The speed of the German victory over and occupation of France in mid-1940 took Stalin by surprise. He seemingly focused on appeasement in order to delay conflict. After the Tripartite Pact was signed by the Axis powers of Germany, Japan, and Italy in October 1940, Stalin proposed that the USSR also join the Axis alliance. To demonstrate peaceful intentions, in April 1941 the Soviets signed a neutrality pact with Japan. Stalin, who had been the country's de facto head of government for almost 15 years, concluded that relations with Germany had deteriorated to such an extent that he needed to become de jure head of government as well, and on 6 May, replaced Molotov as Premier of the Soviet Union.

=== 1941–1942: German invasion ===
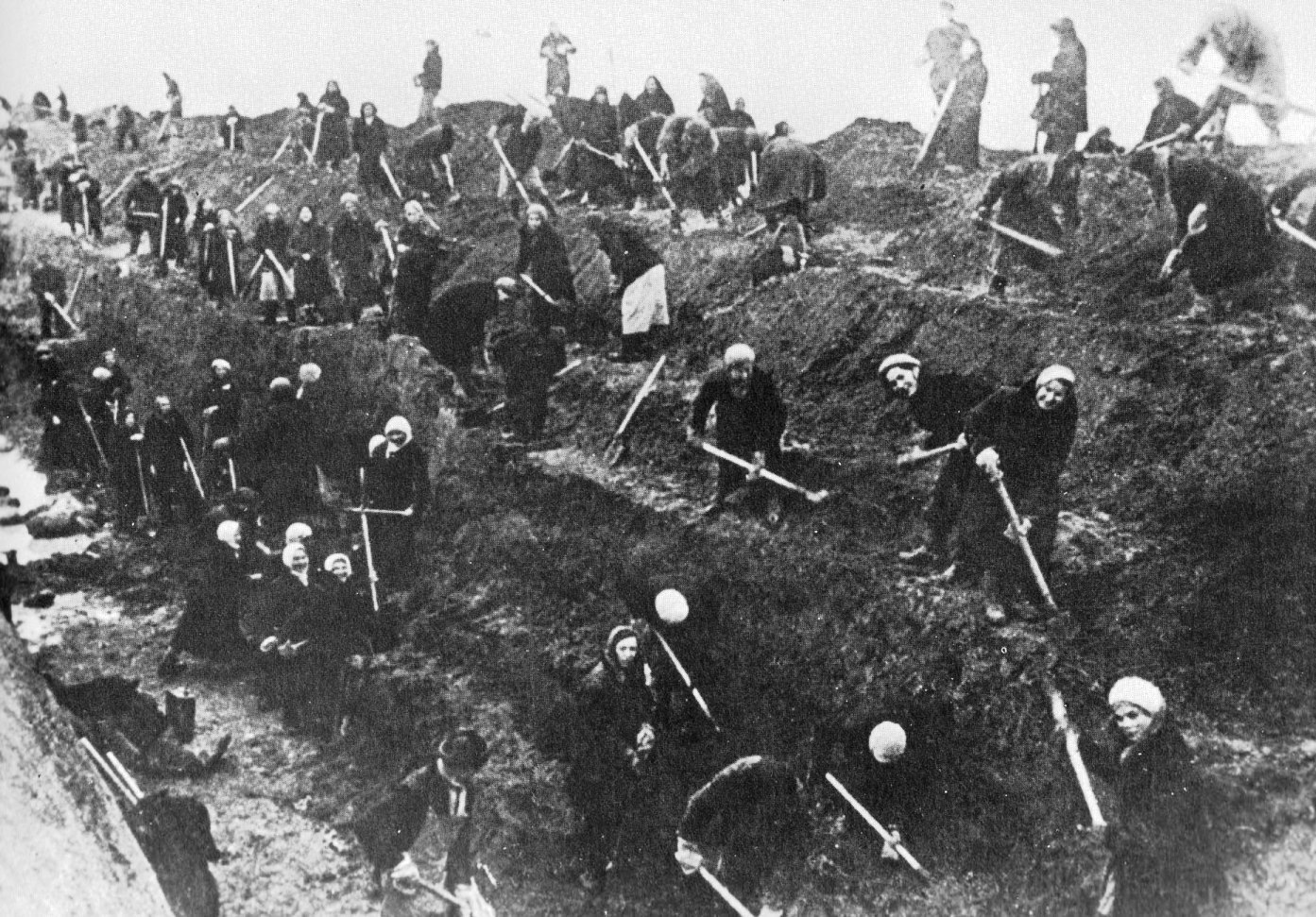
With all the men at the front, women dig anti-tank trenches around Moscow in 1941.

In June 1941, Germany invaded the Soviet Union, initiating the war on the Eastern Front. Despite intelligence agencies repeatedly warning him of Germany's intentions, Stalin was taken by surprise. He formed a State Defence Committee, which he headed as Supreme Commander, as well as a military Supreme Command (Stavka), with Georgy Zhukov as its chief of staff. The German tactic of blitzkrieg was initially highly effective; the Soviet air force in the western borderlands was destroyed within two days. The German Wehrmacht pushed deep into Soviet territory; soon, Ukraine, Byelorussia, and the Baltic states were under German occupation, and Leningrad was under siege; and Soviet refugees were flooding into Moscow and surrounding cities. By July, Germany's Luftwaffe was bombing Moscow, and by October the Wehrmacht was amassing for a full assault on the capital. Plans were made for the Soviet government to evacuate to Kuibyshev, although Stalin decided to remain in Moscow, believing his flight would damage troop morale. The German advance on Moscow was halted after two months of battle in increasingly harsh weather conditions.

Going against the advice of Zhukov and other generals, Stalin emphasised attack over defence. In June 1941, he ordered a scorched earth policy of destroying infrastructure and food supplies before the Germans could seize them, also commanding the NKVD to kill around 100,000 political prisoners in areas the Wehrmacht approached. He purged the military command; several high-ranking figures were demoted or reassigned and others were arrested and executed. With Order No. 270, Stalin commanded soldiers risking capture to fight to the death, describing the captured as traitors; among those taken as a prisoner of war was Stalin's son Yakov, who died in German custody. Stalin issued Order No. 227 in July 1942, which directed that those retreating unauthorised would be placed in "penal battalions" and used as cannon fodder. Both the German and Soviet armies disregarded the laws of war in the Geneva Conventions; the Soviets heavily publicised Nazi massacres of communists, Jews, and Romani. In April 1942, Stalin sponsored the formation of the Jewish Anti-Fascist Committee (JAC) to garner global Jewish support for the war effort.

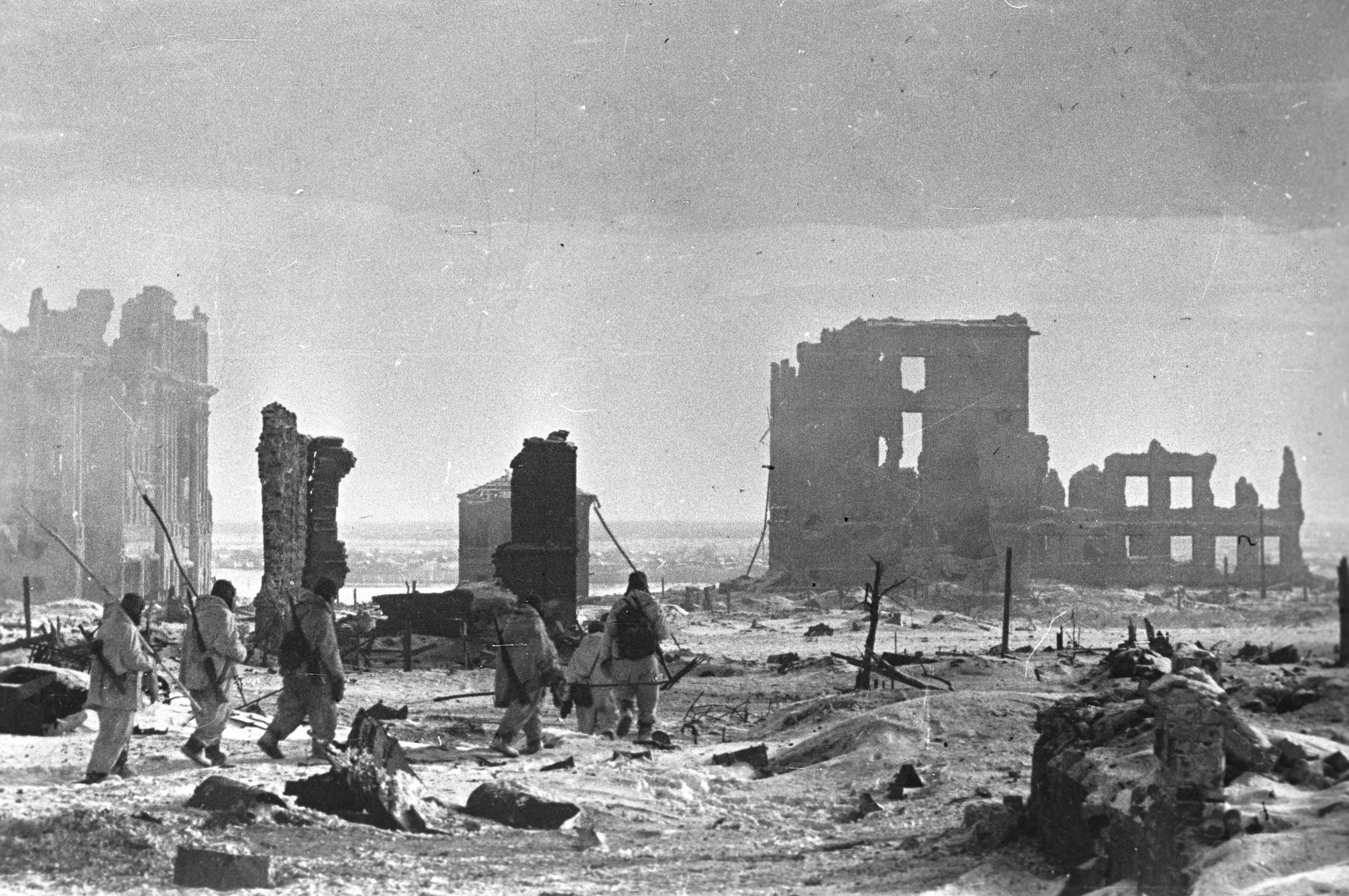
The centre of Stalingrad after its liberation, February 1943

The Soviets allied with the UK and US; although the US joined the war against Germany in 1941, little direct American assistance reached the Soviets until late 1942. Responding to the invasion, the Soviets expanded their industry in central Russia, focusing almost entirely on military production. They achieved high levels of productivity, outstripping Germany. During the war, Stalin was more tolerant of the Russian Orthodox Church and allowed it to resume some of its activities. He also permitted a wider range of cultural expression, notably permitting formerly suppressed writers and artists like Anna Akhmatova and Dmitri Shostakovich to disperse their work more widely. "The Internationale" was dropped as the country's national anthem, to be replaced with a more patriotic song. The government increasingly promoted Pan-Slavist sentiment, while encouraging increased criticism of cosmopolitanism, particularly "rootless cosmopolitanism", an approach with particular repercussions for Soviet Jews. The Communist International was dissolved in 1943, and Stalin began encouraging foreign Marxist–Leninist parties to emphasise nationalism over internationalism in order to broaden their domestic appeal.

In April 1942, Stalin overrode Stavka by ordering the Soviets' first serious counter-attack, an attempt to seize German-held Kharkov in eastern Ukraine. This attack proved unsuccessful. That year, Hitler shifted his primary goal from an overall victory on the Eastern Front to the goal of securing the oil fields in the southern Soviet Union crucial to a long-term German war effort. While Red Army generals saw evidence that Hitler would shift efforts south, Stalin considered this to be a flanking move in a renewed effort to take Moscow. In June 1942, the German Army began a major offensive in Southern Russia, threatening Stalingrad; Stalin ordered the Red Army to hold the city at all costs, resulting in the protracted Battle of Stalingrad, which became the bloodiest and fiercest battle of the entire war. In February 1943, the German forces attacking Stalingrad surrendered. The Soviet victory there marked a major turning point in the war; in commemoration, Stalin declared himself Marshal of the Soviet Union in March.

=== 1942–1945: Soviet counter-attack ===
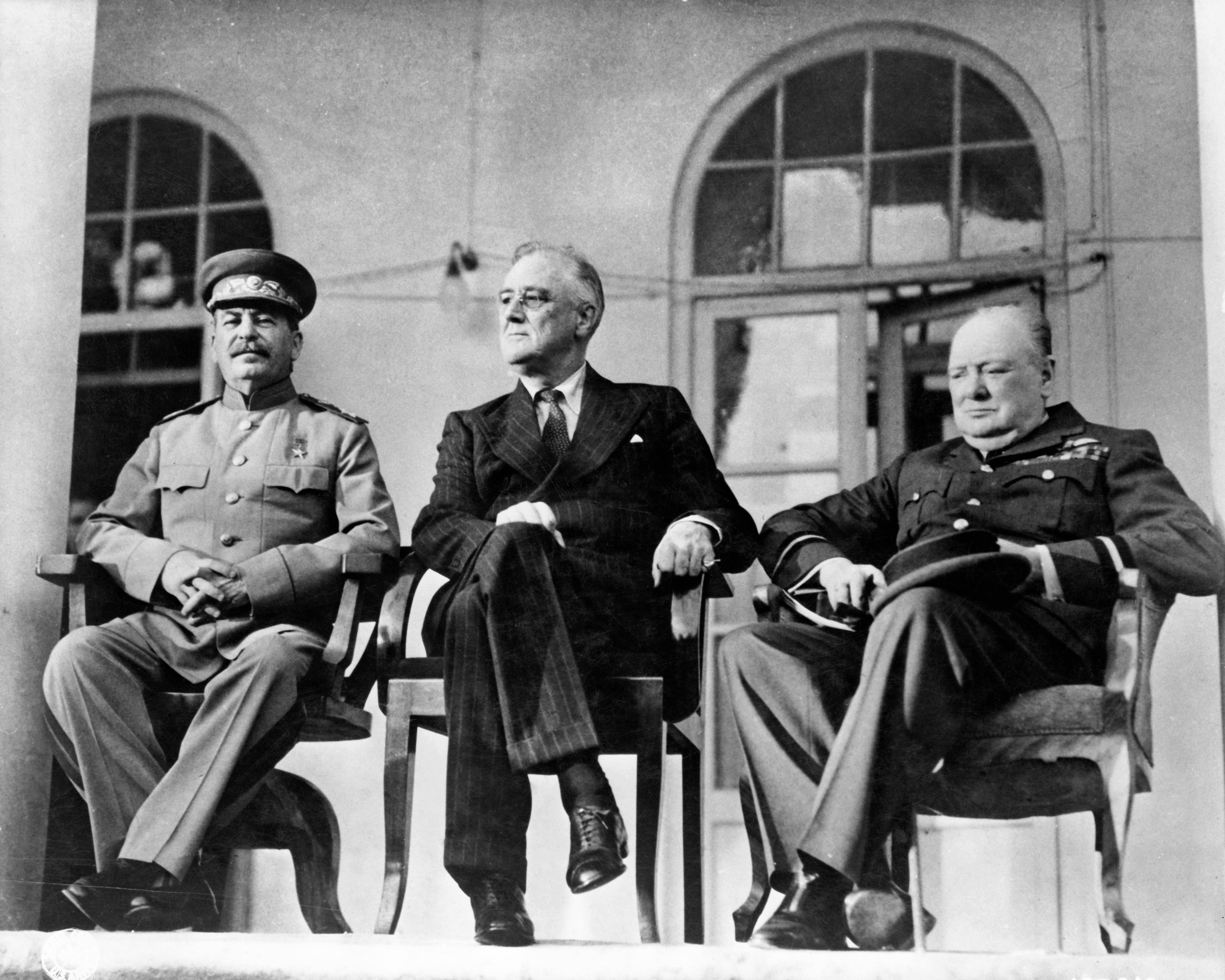
The Big Three: Stalin, US President Franklin D. Roosevelt, and British Prime Minister Winston Churchill at the Tehran Conference, November 1943

By November 1942, the Soviets had begun to repulse the German southern campaign and, although there were 2.5 million Soviet casualties in that effort, it permitted the Soviets to take the offensive for most of the rest of the war on the Eastern Front. In summer 1943, Germany attempted an encirclement attack at Kursk, which was successfully repulsed by the Soviets. By the end of the year, the Soviets occupied half of the territory taken by the Germans to that point. Soviet military industrial output also increased substantially from late 1941 to early 1943 after Stalin had moved factories to the east of the front, safe from invasion and aerial assault.

In Allied countries, Stalin was increasingly depicted in a positive light over the course of the war. In 1941, the London Philharmonic Orchestra performed a concert to celebrate his birthday, and in 1942, Time magazine named him "Man of the Year". When Stalin learnt that people in Western countries affectionately called him "Uncle Joe" he was initially offended, regarding it as undignified. There remained mutual suspicions between Stalin, British Prime Minister Winston Churchill, and US President Franklin D. Roosevelt, together known as the "Big Three". Churchill flew to Moscow to visit Stalin in August 1942 and again in October 1944. Stalin scarcely left Moscow during the war, frustrating Roosevelt and Churchill with his reluctance to meet them.

In November 1943, Stalin met with Churchill and Roosevelt in Tehran, a location of Stalin's choosing. There, Stalin and Roosevelt got on well, with both desiring the post-war dismantling of the British Empire. At Tehran, the trio agreed that to prevent Germany rising to military prowess yet again, the German state should be broken up. Roosevelt and Churchill also agreed to Stalin's demand that the German city of Königsberg be declared Soviet territory. Stalin was impatient for the UK and US to open up a Western Front to take the pressure off the East; they eventually did so in mid-1944. Stalin insisted that, after the war, the Soviet Union should incorporate the portions of Poland it had occupied in 1939, which Churchill opposed. Later in 1944, discussing the fate of the Balkans, Churchill agreed to Stalin's suggestion that, after the war, Bulgaria, Romania, Hungary, and Yugoslavia would come under the Soviet sphere of influence, while Greece would come under that of the Western powers.

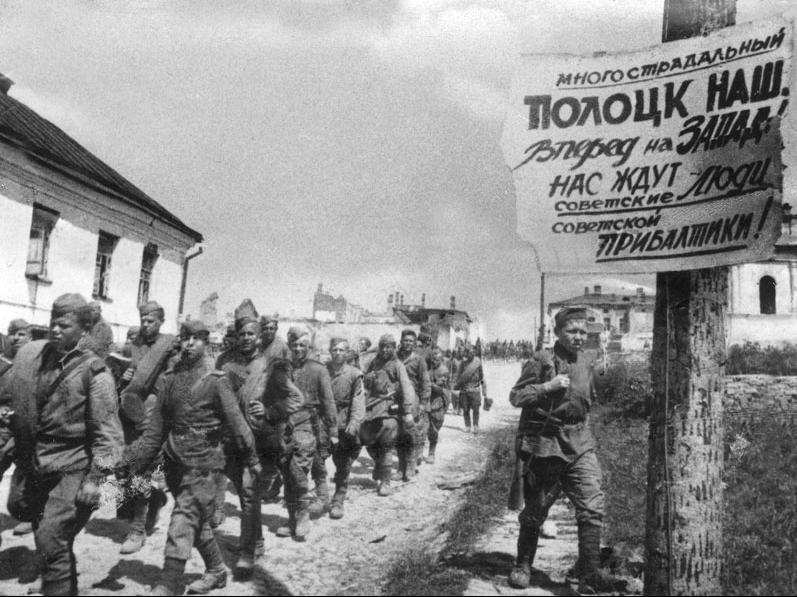
Soviet soldiers in Polotsk, July 1944

In 1944, the Soviet Union made significant advances across Eastern Europe toward Germany, including Operation Bagration, a massive offensive in the Byelorussian SSR against the German Army Group Centre. In 1944, the German armies were pushed out of the Baltic states, which were then re-annexed into the Soviet Union. As the Red Army reconquered the Caucasus and Crimea, various ethnic groups living in the region—the Kalmyks, Chechens, Ingushi, Karachai, Balkars, and Crimean Tatars—were accused of having collaborated with the Germans. Using the idea of collective responsibility as a basis, Stalin's government abolished their autonomous republics and between late 1943 and 1944 deported the majority of their populations to Central Asia and Siberia. Over one million people were deported as a result of the policy, with high rates of mortality.

In February 1945, the three leaders met at the Yalta Conference. Roosevelt and Churchill conceded to Stalin's demand that Germany pay the Soviet Union 20 billion dollars in reparations, and that his country be permitted to annex Sakhalin and the Kuril Islands in exchange for entering the war against Japan. An agreement was also made that a post-war Polish government should be a coalition consisting of both communist and conservative elements. Privately, Stalin sought to ensure that Poland would come fully under Soviet influence. The Red Army withheld assistance to Polish resistance fighters battling the Germans in the Warsaw Uprising, with Stalin believing that any victorious Polish militants could interfere with his future aspirations to dominate Poland. Stalin placed great emphasis on capturing Berlin before the Western Allies, believing that this would enable him to bring more of Europe under long-term Soviet control. Churchill, concerned by this, unsuccessfully tried to convince the US that they should pursue the same goal.

=== 1945: Victory ===
British Prime Minister Clement Attlee, US President Harry S. Truman, and Stalin at the Potsdam Conference, July 1945

In April 1945, the Red Army seized Berlin, Hitler killed himself, and Germany surrendered in May. Stalin had wanted Hitler captured alive; he had his remains brought to Moscow in order to prevent them becoming a relic for Nazi sympathisers. Many Soviet soldiers engaged in looting, pillaging, and rape, both in Germany and parts of Eastern Europe. Stalin refused to punish the offenders. With Germany defeated, Stalin switched focus to the war with Japan, transferring half a million troops to the Far East. Stalin was pressed by his allies to enter the war and wanted to cement the Soviet Union's strategic position in Asia. On 8 August, in between the US atomic bombings of Hiroshima and Nagasaki, the Soviet army invaded Japanese-occupied Manchuria and northern Korea, defeating the Kwantung Army. These events led to the Japanese surrender and the war's end. The US rebuffed Stalin's desire for the Red Army to take a role in the Allied occupation of Japan.

At the Potsdam Conference in July–August 1945, Stalin repeated previous promises that he would refrain from a "Sovietisation" of Eastern Europe. Stalin pushed for reparations from Germany without regard to the base minimum supply for German citizens' survival, which worried Harry Truman and Churchill, who thought that Germany would become a financial burden for the Western powers. Stalin also pushed for "war booty", which would permit the Soviet Union to seize property from conquered nations without quantitative or qualitative limitation; a clause was eventually added allowing this with specific restrictions. Germany was divided into four zones: Soviet, American, British, and French, with Berlin—located in the Soviet area—also divided thusly.

== Post-war era ==
=== 1945–1947: Post-war reconstruction ===
After the war, Stalin was at the apex of his career. Within the Soviet Union he was widely regarded as the embodiment of victory and patriotism, and his armies controlled Central and Eastern Europe up to the River Elbe. In June 1945, Stalin adopted the title of Generalissimo and stood atop Lenin's Mausoleum to watch a celebratory parade led by Zhukov through Red Square. At a banquet held for army commanders, he described the Russian people as "the outstanding nation" and "leading force" within the Soviet Union, the first time that he had unequivocally endorsed Russians over the other Soviet nationalities. In 1946, the state published Stalin's Collected Works. In 1947, it brought out a second edition of his official biography, which glorified him to a greater extent than its predecessor. He was quoted in Pravda on a daily basis and pictures of him remained pervasive on the walls of workplaces and homes.

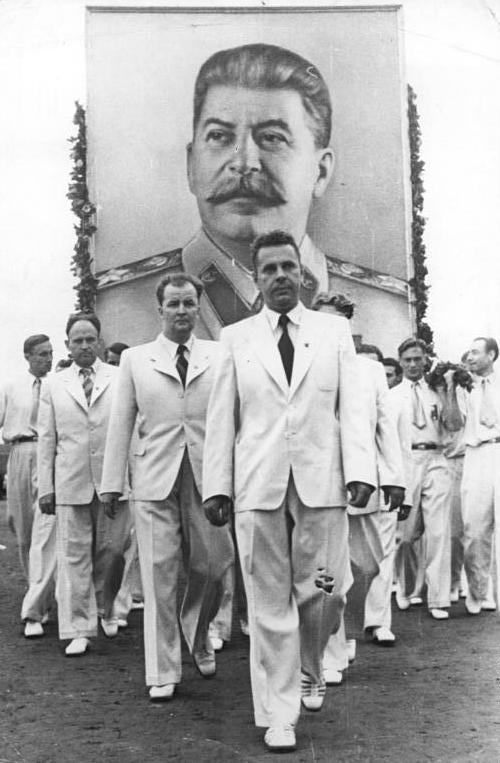
Banner of Stalin in Budapest in 1949

Despite his popularity and strengthened international position, Stalin was cautious about internal dissent and desire for change among the population of the Soviet Union. He was also concerned about his returning armies, who had been exposed to a wide range of consumer goods in Germany, much of which they had looted and brought back with them. In this he recalled the 1825 Decembrist Revolt by Russian soldiers returning from having defeated France in the Napoleonic Wars. He ensured that returning Soviet prisoners of war went through "filtration" camps as they arrived in the Soviet Union, in which 2,775,700 were interrogated to determine if they were traitors. About half were then imprisoned in labour camps. In the Baltic states, where there was much opposition to Soviet rule, dekulakisation and de-clericalisation programmes were initiated, resulting in 142,000 deportations between 1945 and 1949. The Gulag system of forced labour camps was expanded further. By January 1953, three percent of the Soviet population was imprisoned or in internal exile, with 2.8 million in "special settlements" in isolated areas and another 2.5 million in camps, penal colonies, and prisons.

The NKVD were ordered to catalogue the scale of destruction during the war. It was established that 1,710 Soviet towns and 70,000 villages had been destroyed. The NKVD recorded that between 26 and 27 million Soviet citizens had been killed, with millions more being wounded, malnourished, or orphaned. In the war's aftermath, some of Stalin's associates suggested modifications to government policy. Post-war Soviet society was more tolerant than its pre-war phase in various respects. Stalin allowed the Russian Orthodox Church to retain the churches it had opened during the war, and academia and the arts were also allowed greater freedom. Recognising the need for drastic steps to be taken to combat inflation and promote economic recovery, in December 1947 Stalin's government devalued the rouble and abolished the food rationing system. Capital punishment was abolished in 1947 but re-instituted in 1950. Stalin's health deteriorated, and he grew increasingly concerned that senior figures might try to oust him. He demoted Molotov, and increasingly favoured Beria and Malenkov for key positions. In the Leningrad affair, the city's leadership was purged amid accusations of treachery; executions of many of the accused took place in 1950.

In the post-war period there were often food shortages in Soviet cities, and the USSR experienced a major famine from 1946 to 1947. Sparked by a drought and ensuing bad harvest in 1946, it was exacerbated by government policy towards food procurement, including the state's decision to build up stocks and export food rather than distributing it to famine-hit areas. Estimates indicate that between one million and 1.5 million people died from malnutrition or disease as a result. While agricultural production stagnated, Stalin focused on a series of major infrastructure projects, including the construction of hydroelectric plants, canals, and railway lines running to the polar north. Many of these were constructed through prison labour.

=== 1947–1950: Cold War policy ===
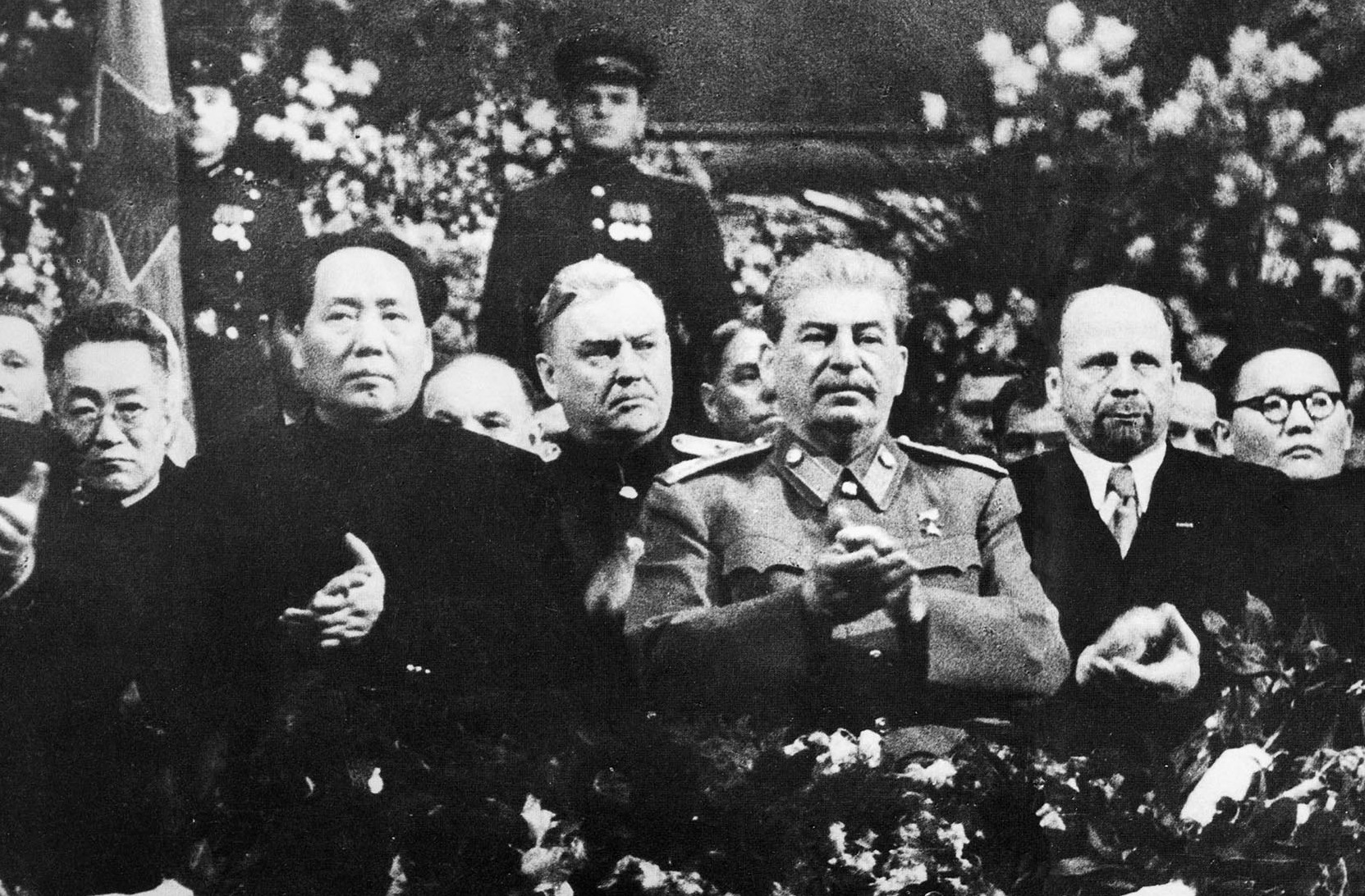
Stalin at his 70th birthday celebration with (left to right) Mao Zedong, Nikolai Bulganin, Walter Ulbricht, and Yumjaagiin Tsedenbal, in Moscow, December 1949

In the aftermath of the war, the British Empire declined, leaving the US and USSR as the dominant world powers. Tensions among these former Allies grew, resulting in the Cold War. Although Stalin publicly described the British and US governments as aggressive, he thought it unlikely that a war with them would be imminent, believing that several decades of peace was likely. He nevertheless secretly intensified Soviet research into nuclear weaponry, intent on creating an atom bomb. Still, Stalin foresaw the undesirability of a nuclear conflict, stating that "atomic weapons can hardly be used without spelling the end of the world." He personally took a keen interest in the development of the weapon. In August 1949, the bomb was successfully tested in the deserts outside Semipalatinsk in Kazakhstan. Stalin also initiated a new military build-up; the Soviet army was expanded from 2.9 million soldiers, as it stood in 1949, to 5.8 million by 1953.

The US began pushing its interests on every continent, acquiring air force bases in Africa and Asia and ensuring pro-US regimes took power across Latin America. It launched the Marshall Plan in June 1947, with which it sought to undermine Soviet hegemony throughout Eastern Europe. The US offered financial assistance to countries on the condition that they opened their markets to trade, aware that the Soviets would never agree. The Allies demanded that Stalin withdraw the Red Army from northern Iran. He initially refused, leading to an international crisis in 1946, but relented one year later. Stalin also tried to maximise Soviet influence on the world stage, unsuccessfully pushing for Libya—recently liberated from Italian occupation—to become a Soviet protectorate. He sent Molotov as his representative to San Francisco to take part in negotiations to form the United Nations, insisting that the Soviets have a place on its Security Council. In April 1949, the Western powers established the North Atlantic Treaty Organisation (NATO), an anti-Soviet military alliance led by the US In the West, Stalin was increasingly portrayed as the "most evil dictator alive" and compared to Hitler.

In 1948, Stalin edited and rewrote sections of Falsifiers of History, published as a series of Pravda articles in February 1948 and then in book form. Written in response to public revelations of the 1939 Soviet alliance with Germany, it focused on blaming the Western powers for the war. He also erroneously claimed that the initial German advance in the early part of the war, during Operation Barbarossa, was not a result of Soviet military weakness, but rather a deliberate Soviet strategic retreat. In 1949, celebrations took place to mark Stalin's 70th birthday (although he actually was turning 71 at the time) at which Stalin attended an event at the Bolshoi Theatre alongside Marxist–Leninist leaders from across Europe and Asia.

==== Eastern Bloc ====
Eastern Bloc during the Cold War

After the war, Stalin sought to retain Soviet dominance across Eastern Europe while expanding its influence in Asia. Cautiously regarding the responses from the Western Allies, Stalin avoided immediately installing communist governments in Eastern Europe, instead initially ensuring that Marxist-Leninists were placed in coalition ministries. In contrast to his approach to the Baltic states, he rejected the proposal of merging the new communist states into the Soviet Union, rather recognising them as independent nation-states. He was faced with the problem that there were few Marxists left in Eastern Europe, with most having been killed by the Nazis. He demanded that war reparations be paid by Germany and its Axis allies Hungary, Romania, and the Slovak Republic. Aware that the countries of Eastern Europe had been pushed to socialism through invasion rather than revolution, Stalin called them "people's democracies" instead of "dictatorships of the proletariat".

Churchill observed that an "Iron Curtain" had been drawn across Europe, separating the east from the west. In September 1947, a meeting of Eastern European communist leaders established the Cominform to coordinate communist parties across Eastern Europe and also in France and Italy. Stalin did not personally attend the meeting, sending Andrei Zhdanov in his place. Various East European communists also visited Stalin in Moscow. There, he offered advice on their ideas; for instance, he cautioned against the Yugoslav idea for a Balkan Federation incorporating Bulgaria and Albania. Stalin had a particularly strained relationship with Yugoslavian leader Josip Broz Tito due to the latter's continued calls for a Balkan federation and for Soviet aid for the communist forces in the ongoing Greek Civil War. In March 1948, Stalin launched an anti-Tito campaign, accusing the Yugoslav communists of adventurism and deviating from Marxist–Leninist doctrine. At the second Cominform conference, held in Bucharest in June 1948, East European communist leaders all denounced Tito's government, accusing them of being fascists and agents of Western capitalism. Stalin ordered several assassination attempts on Tito's life and even contemplated an invasion of Yugoslavia itself.

Stalin suggested that a unified, but demilitarised, German state be established, hoping that it would either come under Soviet influence or remain neutral. When the US and UK opposed this, Stalin sought to force their hand by blockading Berlin in June 1948. He gambled that the Western powers would not risk war, but they airlifted supplies into West Berlin until May 1949, when Stalin relented and ended the blockade. In September 1949, the Western powers transformed their zones into an independent Federal Republic of Germany; in response the Soviets formed theirs into the German Democratic Republic in October. In accordance with earlier agreements, the Western powers expected Poland to become an independent state with free democratic elections. In Poland, the Soviets merged various socialist parties into the Polish United Workers' Party (PZPR), and vote rigging was used to ensure that the PZPR secured office. The 1947 Hungarian elections were also rigged by Stalin, with the Hungarian Working People's Party taking control. In Czechoslovakia, where the communists did have a level of popular support, they were elected the largest party in 1946. Monarchy was abolished in Bulgaria and Romania. Across Eastern Europe, the Soviet model was enforced, with a termination of political pluralism, agricultural collectivisation, and investment in heavy industry. It was aimed at establishing economic autarky within the Eastern Bloc.

==== Asia ====
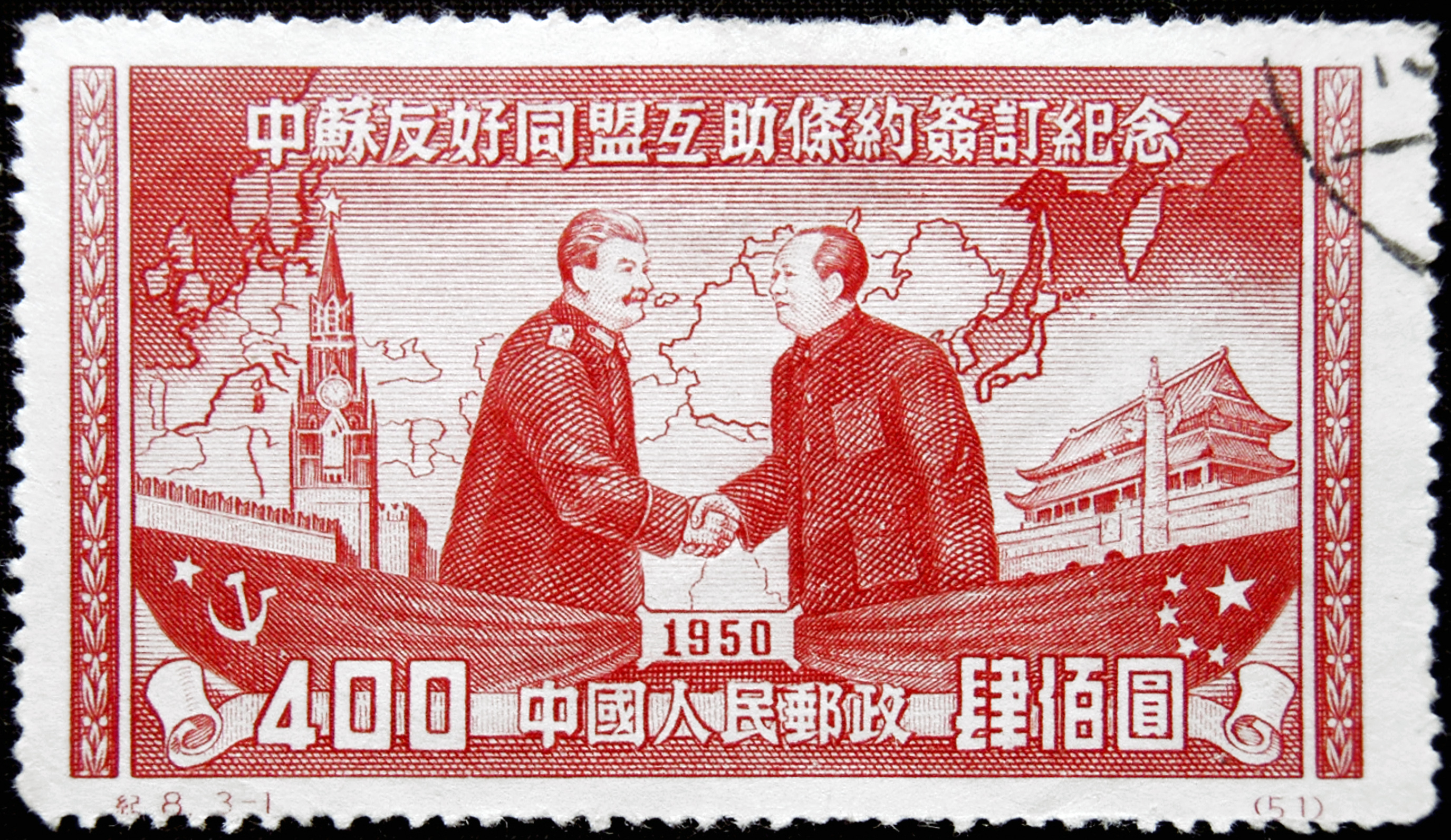
1950 Chinese stamp depicting Stalin and Mao shaking hands, commemorating the signing of the new Sino-Soviet Treaty

In October 1949, Chinese Communist Party chairman Mao Zedong took power in China and proclaimed the People's Republic of China. Marxist governments now controlled a third of the world's land mass. Privately, Stalin revealed that he had underestimated the Chinese Communists and their ability to win the civil war, instead encouraging them to make another peace with the KMT. In December 1949, Mao visited Stalin. Initially, Stalin refused to repeal the Sino-Soviet Treaty of 1945, which significantly benefited the Soviet Union over China, although in January 1950 he relented and agreed to sign a new treaty. Stalin was concerned that Mao might follow Tito's example by pursuing a course independent of Soviet influence, and made it known that if displeased he would withdraw assistance; the Chinese desperately needed said assistance after decades of civil war.

At the end of World War II, the Soviet Union and the US divided up the Korean Peninsula, formerly a Japanese colonial possession, along the 38th parallel, setting up a communist government in the north and a pro-Western, anti-communist government in the south. North Korean leader Kim Il Sung visited Stalin in March 1949 and again in March 1950; he wanted to invade the south, and although Stalin was initially reluctant to provide support, he eventually agreed by May 1950. The North Korean Army launched the Korean War by invading South Korea in June 1950, making swift gains and capturing Seoul. Both Stalin and Mao believed that a swift victory would ensue. The US went to the UN Security Council—which the Soviets were boycotting over its refusal to recognise Mao's government—and secured international military support for the South Koreans. US-led forces pushed the North Koreans back. Stalin wanted to avoid direct Soviet conflict with the US, and convinced the Chinese to enter the war to aid the North in October 1950.

The Soviet Union was one of the first nations to extend diplomatic recognition to the newly created state of Israel in 1948, in hopes of obtaining an ally in the Middle East. When the Israeli ambassador Golda Meir arrived in the USSR, Stalin was angered by the Jewish crowds who gathered to greet her. He was further angered by Israel's growing alliance with the US After Stalin fell out with Israel, he launched an anti-Jewish campaign within the Soviet Union and the Eastern Bloc. In November 1948, he abolished the JAC, and show trials took place for some of its members. The Soviet press engaged in vituperative attacks on Zionism, Jewish culture, and "rootless cosmopolitanism", with growing levels of antisemitism being expressed across Soviet society. Stalin's increasing tolerance of antisemitism may have stemmed from his increasing Russian nationalism or from the recognition that antisemitism had proved a useful tool for Hitler; he may have increasingly viewed the Jewish people as a "counter-revolutionary" nation. There were rumours that Stalin was planning on deporting all Soviet Jews to the Jewish Autonomous Region in Birobidzhan in Siberia.

=== 1950–1953: Final years ===
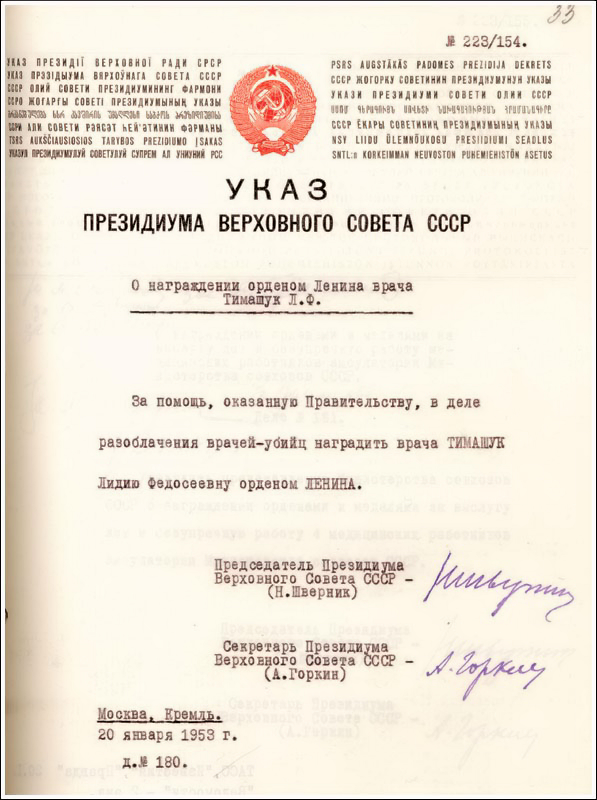
Decree dated 20 January 1953 awarding Lydia Timashuk the Order of Lenin for "unmasking doctors-killers". Revoked after Stalin's death later that year.

During the last three years of his life, Stalin was in poor health. He took increasingly long holidays; in the summer of 1950 and again in 1951 where he spent almost five months on holiday at his Abkhazian dacha. Stalin nevertheless mistrusted his doctors; in January 1952, he had one imprisoned after they suggested that he should retire to improve his health. In September 1952, several Kremlin doctors were arrested for allegedly plotting to kill senior politicians in what came to be known as the doctors' plot; the majority of the accused were Jewish. Stalin ordered that the doctors be tortured to ensure confessions. In November, the Slánský trial took place in Czechoslovakia, in which 13 senior Communist Party figures, 11 of them Jewish, were accused and convicted of being part of a vast Zionist-American conspiracy to subvert the Eastern Bloc. The same month, a much publicised trial of accused Jewish industrial wreckers took place in Ukraine. In 1951, Stalin initiated the Mingrelian affair, a purge of the Georgian Communist Party which resulted in over 11,000 deportations.

From 1946 until his death, Stalin only gave three public speeches, two of which lasted only a few minutes. The amount of written material that he produced also declined. In 1950, Stalin issued the article "Marxism and Problems of Linguistics", which reflected his interest in questions of Russian nationhood. In 1952, Stalin's last book, Economic Problems of Socialism in the USSR, was published. It sought to provide a guide to leading the country after his death. In October 1952, he gave an hour and a half speech at the Central Committee plenum. There, he emphasised what he regarded as necessary leadership qualities, and highlighted the weaknesses of potential successors, notably Molotov and Mikoyan. In 1952, he eliminated the Politburo and replaced it with a larger version he named the Presidium.

==== Death, funeral, and aftermath ====
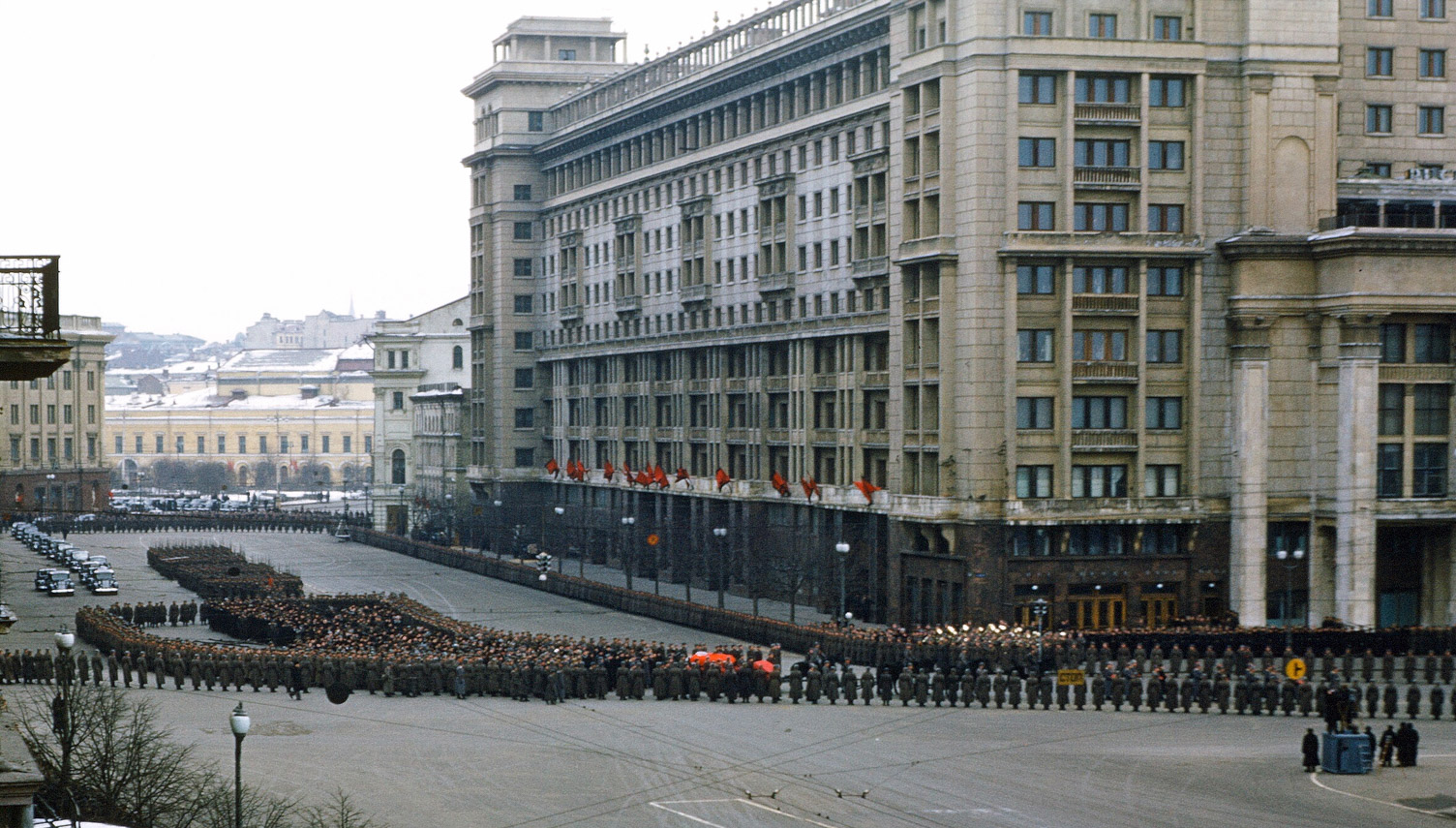
Stalin's funeral procession on Okhotny Ryad

On the late afternoon of 1 March 1953, Stalin's staff found him semi-conscious on the bedroom floor of his Kuntsevo Dacha. He was moved onto a couch and remained there for three days, during which he was hand-fed using a spoon and given various medicines and injections. Stalin's condition continued to deteriorate, and he died on 5 March. An autopsy revealed that he had died of a cerebral haemorrhage, and that his cerebral arteries had been severely damaged by atherosclerosis. Stalin's death was announced on 6 March; his body was embalmed, and then displayed in Moscow's House of Unions for three days. The crowds coming to view the body were so large and disorganised that many people were killed in a crowd crush. At the funeral on 9 March, attended by hundreds of thousands, Stalin was laid to rest in Lenin's Mausoleum in Red Square.

Stalin left neither a designated successor nor a framework within which a peaceful transfer of power could take place. The Central Committee met on the day of his death, after which Malenkov, Beria, and Khrushchev emerged as the party's dominant figures. The system of collective leadership was restored, and measures introduced to prevent any one member from attaining autocratic domination. The collective leadership included Georgy Malenkov, Lavrentiy Beria, Vyacheslav Molotov, Kliment Voroshilov, Nikita Khrushchev, Nikolai Bulganin, Lazar Kaganovich, and Anastas Mikoyan. Reforms to the Soviet system were immediately implemented. Economic reform scaled back mass construction projects, placed a new emphasis on house building, and eased the levels of taxation on the peasantry to stimulate production. The new leaders sought rapprochement with Yugoslavia and a less hostile relationship with the US, and they pursued a negotiated end to the Korean War in July 1953. The imprisoned doctors were released and the antisemitic purges ceased. A mass amnesty for certain convicts was issued, halving the country's inmate population, and the state security and Gulag systems were reformed.

== Political ideology and beliefs ==
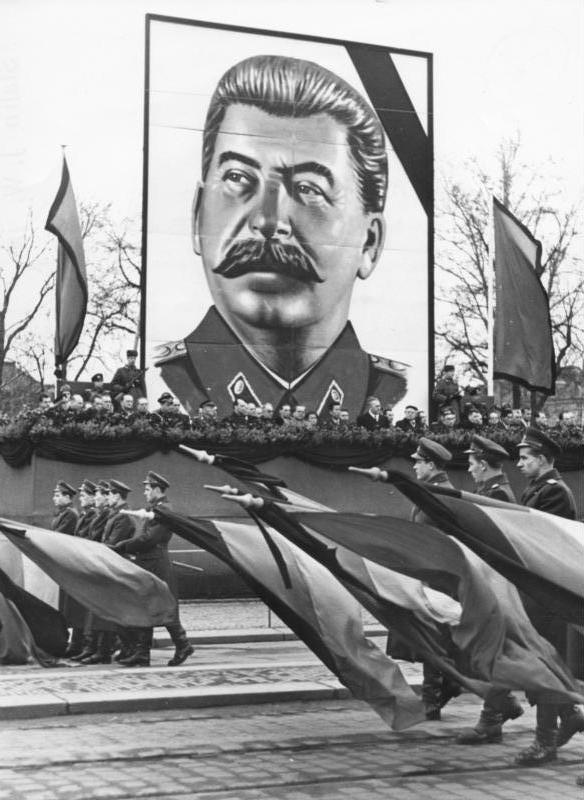
Mourning parade in honour of Stalin in Dresden, East Germany, 1953

Stalin claimed to have embraced Marxism at the age of 15, and it served as the guiding philosophy throughout his adult life; according to Kotkin, Stalin held "zealous Marxist convictions", while Simon Sebag Montefiore suggested that Marxism held a "quasi-religious" value for Stalin. Erik van Ree argues that Stalin did not view Marxism as a literal religion, but believed it was necessary for the masses to experience it as one, calling it "the religion of a class". Stalin believed that the masses required an object of religious devotion and had the "psychology of the herd" and needed a "leading ram", a paternalist "tsar", "a person they can worship and in whose name they can live and work." Although he never became a Georgian nationalist, during his early life elements from Georgian nationalist thought blended with Marxism in his outlook. Stalin believed in the need to adapt Marxism to changing circumstances; in 1917, he declared that "there is dogmatic Marxism and there is creative Marxism. I stand on the ground of the latter". According to scholar Robert Service, Stalin's "few innovations in ideology were crude, dubious developments of Marxism".

Stalin believed in an inevitable "class war" between the world's proletariat and bourgeoisie in which the working classes would prove victorious and establish a dictatorship of the proletariat, regarding the Soviet Union as an example of such a state. He also believed that this proletarian state would need to introduce repressive measures against foreign and domestic "enemies" to ensure the full crushing of the propertied classes, and thus the class war would intensify with the advance of socialism. As a propaganda tool, the shaming of "enemies" explained all inadequate economic and political outcomes, the hardships endured by the populace, and military failures.

Stalin adhered to the Leninist variant of Marxism. In his book, Foundations of Leninism, he stated that "Leninism is the Marxism of the epoch of imperialism and of the proletarian revolution". He claimed to be a loyal Leninist, although was—according to Service—"not a blindly obedient Leninist". Stalin respected Lenin, but not uncritically, and spoke out when he believed that Lenin was wrong. During the period of his revolutionary activity, Stalin regarded some of Lenin's views and actions as being the self-indulgent activities of a spoilt émigré, deeming them counterproductive for those Bolshevik activists based within the Russian Empire itself. After the October Revolution, they continued to have differences, although Kotkin suggested that Stalin's friendship with Lenin was "the single most important relationship in Stalin's life".

Stalin viewed nations as contingent entities which were formed by capitalism and could merge into others. Ultimately, he believed that all nations would merge into a single, global community, and regarded all nations as inherently equal. In his work, he stated that "the right of secession" should be offered to the ethnic minorities of the Russian Empire, but that they should not be encouraged to take that option. He was of the view that if they became fully autonomous, then they would end up being controlled by the most reactionary elements of their community. Stalin's push for Soviet westward expansion into Eastern Europe resulted in accusations of Russian imperialism.

== Personal life and characteristics ==
Ethnically Georgian, Stalin grew up speaking the Georgian language, and did not begin learning Russian until age eight or nine. It has been argued that his ancestry was genetically Ossetian, but he never acknowledged an Ossetian identity. He remained proud of his Georgian identity, and throughout his life retained a heavy Georgian accent when speaking Russian. Some colleagues described him as "Asiatic", and he supposedly said that "I am not a European man, but an Asian, a Russified Georgian".

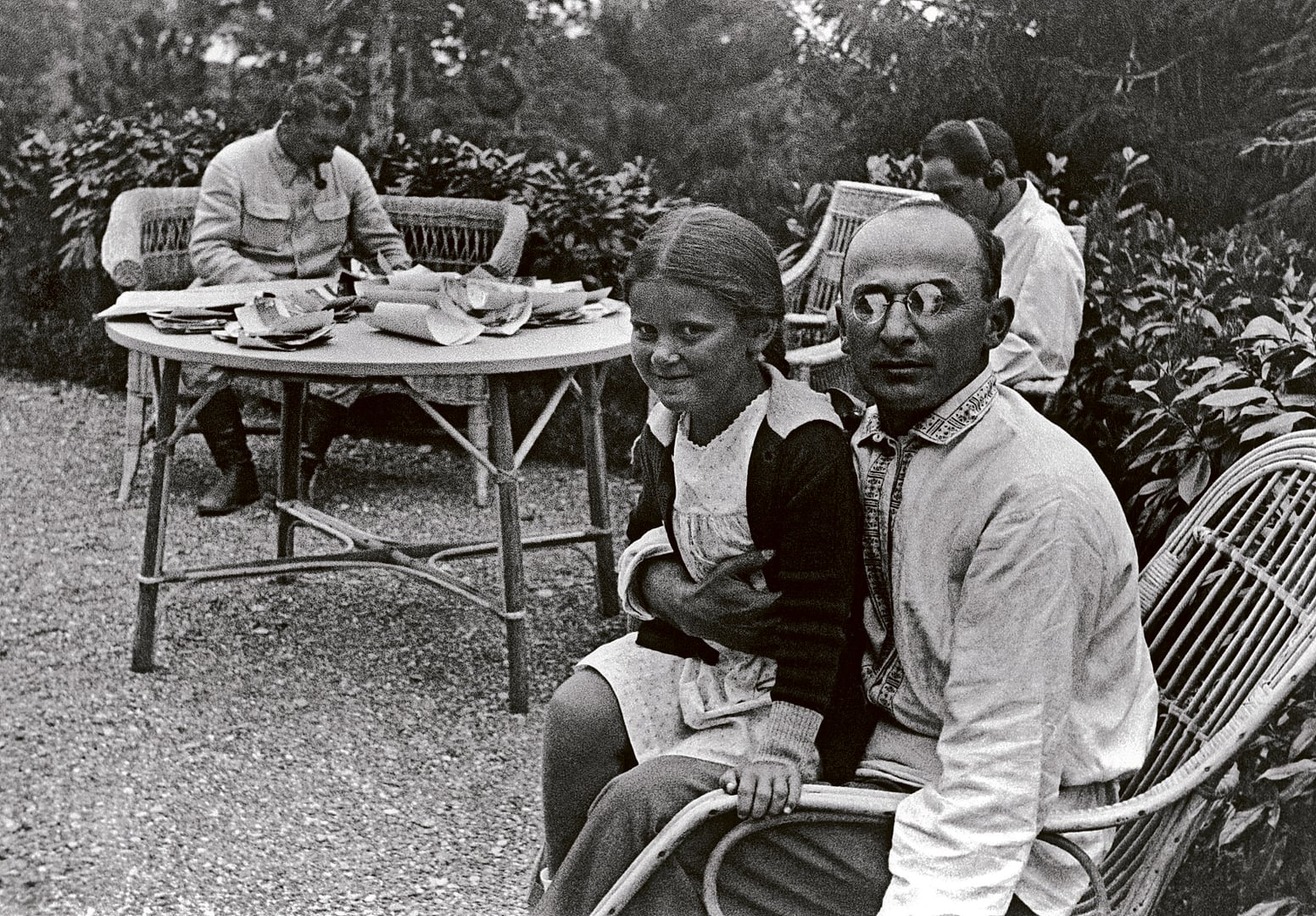
Lavrentiy Beria with Stalin's daughter, Svetlana, on his lap, with Stalin and Nestor Lakoba in the background, 1931

Described as soft-spoken and a poor orator, Stalin's style was "simple and clear, without flights of fancy, catchy phrases or platform histrionics". He rarely spoke before large audiences and preferred to express himself in writing. He also frequently referred to himself in the third person. In adulthood, Stalin measured 1.70 m (5 feet 7 inches) in height. His moustached face was pock-marked from smallpox during childhood; this was airbrushed from published photographs. His left arm had been injured in childhood leaving it shorter than his right and lacking in flexibility. Stalin was a lifelong smoker, who smoked both a pipe and cigarettes. He lived relatively plainly, with simple and inexpensive clothing and furniture. As leader, Stalin rarely left Moscow unless for holiday; he disliked travel, and refused to travel by plane. In 1934, his Kuntsevo Dacha was built 9 km (5.6 mi) from the Kremlin and became his primary residence. He holidayed in the south USSR every year from 1925 to 1936 and 1945 to 1951, often in Abkhazia, being a friend of its leader, Nestor Lakoba.

=== Personality ===
Stalin in 1937

Trotsky and several other Soviet figures promoted the idea that Stalin was a mediocrity, a characterisation which gained widespread acceptance outside of the Soviet Union during his lifetime. However, historians have described him as having a complex mind, remarkable self-control, and strong memory. Stalin was a diligent worker and an effective and strategic organiser, with a keen interest in learning. As a leader, he meticulously scrutinised details, from film scripts to military plans, and judged others by their inner strength and cleverness. He was skilled at playing different roles depending on the audience, as well as in deception. Although he could be rude, Stalin rarely raised his voice; however, as his health deteriorated, he became unpredictable and bad-tempered. He could be charming and enjoyed cracking jokes when relaxed. At social events, Stalin encouraged singing and drinking, hoping others would drunkenly reveal secrets to him.

Stalin lacked compassion, possibly exacerbated by his repeated imprisonments and exiles, though he occasionally showed kindness to strangers, even during the Great Purge. He could be self-righteous, resentful, and vindictive, often holding grudges for years. By the 1920s, he had become suspicious and conspiratorial, prone to believing in plots against him and international conspiracies. While he never attended torture sessions or executions, Stalin took pleasure in degrading and humiliating people and kept even close associates in a state of "unrelieved fear". Service suggested he had tendencies toward a paranoid and sociopathic personality disorder. Historian E. A. Rees believed it was psychopathy that bred Stalin's tyranny, citing a 1927 diagnosis by neuropathologist Vladimir Bekhterev that described him as a "typical case of severe paranoia". Others have linked Stalin's brutality to his commitment to the survival of the Soviet Union and Marxist–Leninist ideology.

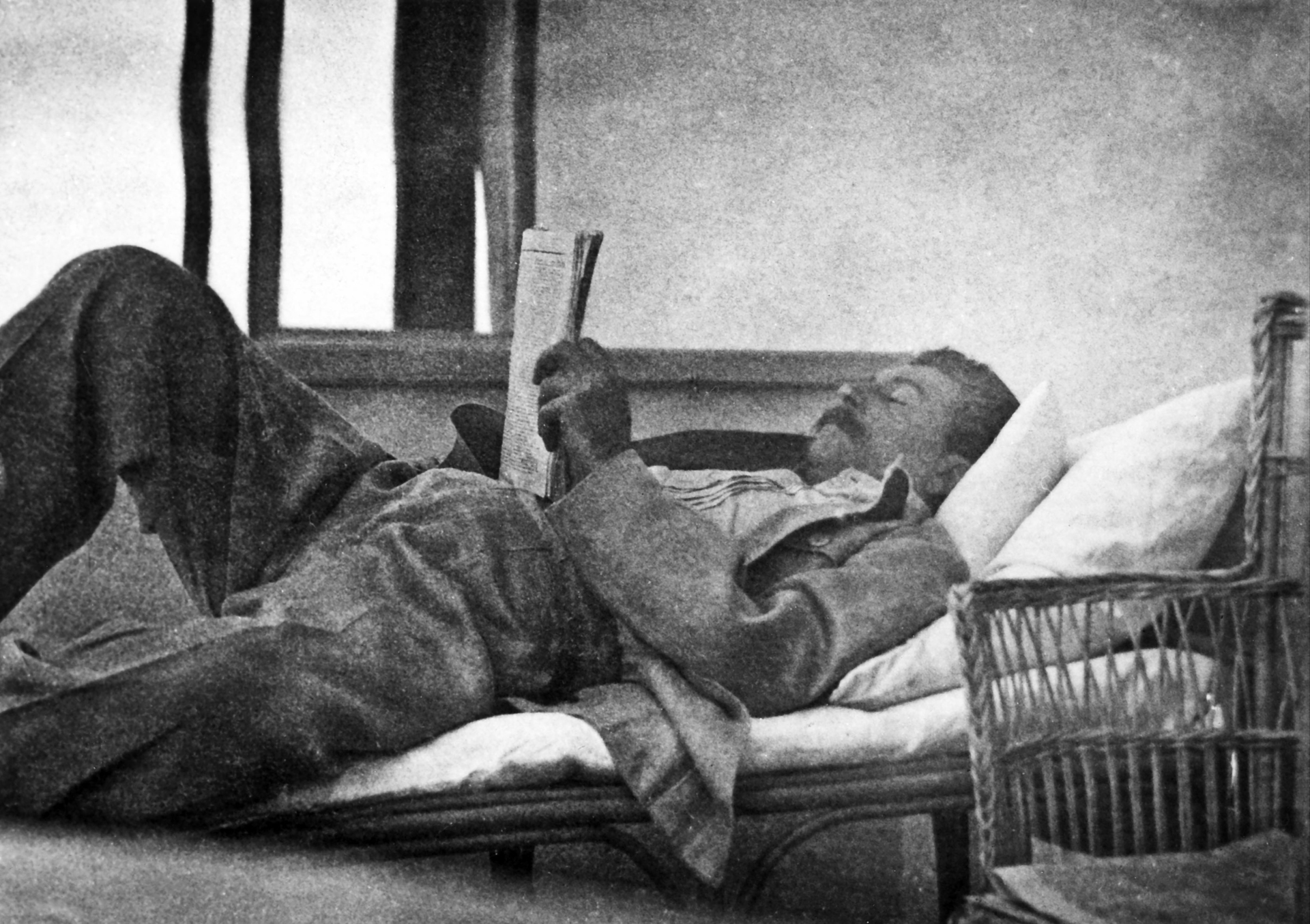
Stalin reading a newspaper, 1920

Stalin had a keen interest in the arts. He protected certain Soviet writers, such as Mikhail Bulgakov, even when their work was criticised as harmful to his government. Stalin enjoyed classical music, owned around 2,700 records, and often attended the Bolshoi Theatre in the 1930s and 1940s. His taste was conservative, favouring classical drama, opera, and ballet over what he dismissed as experimental "formalism", and disliked avant-garde in the visual arts. An autodidact, Stalin was a voracious reader who kept over 20,000 books, with little fiction. His favourite subject was history, and he was especially interested in the reigns of Russian leaders Ivan the Terrible, Peter the Great, and Catherine the Great. Lenin was his favourite author, but he read and appreciated works by Trotsky and other adversaries.

The leader of an atheist government that persecuted religion until World War II, Stalin's private religious beliefs have been debated. According to the book War, Church, Stalin and Metropolitan Elijah by Sergey Fomin, Stalin asked clergy in the Kremlin to pray for victory. Furthermore, Yuri Soloviev, one of Stalin's bodyguards, claimed in his memoirs that Stalin often prayed, and that he owned an icon of Our Lady of Kazan, something that has also been claimed by Stalin's great grandson, Selim Bensaad.

=== Relationships and family ===
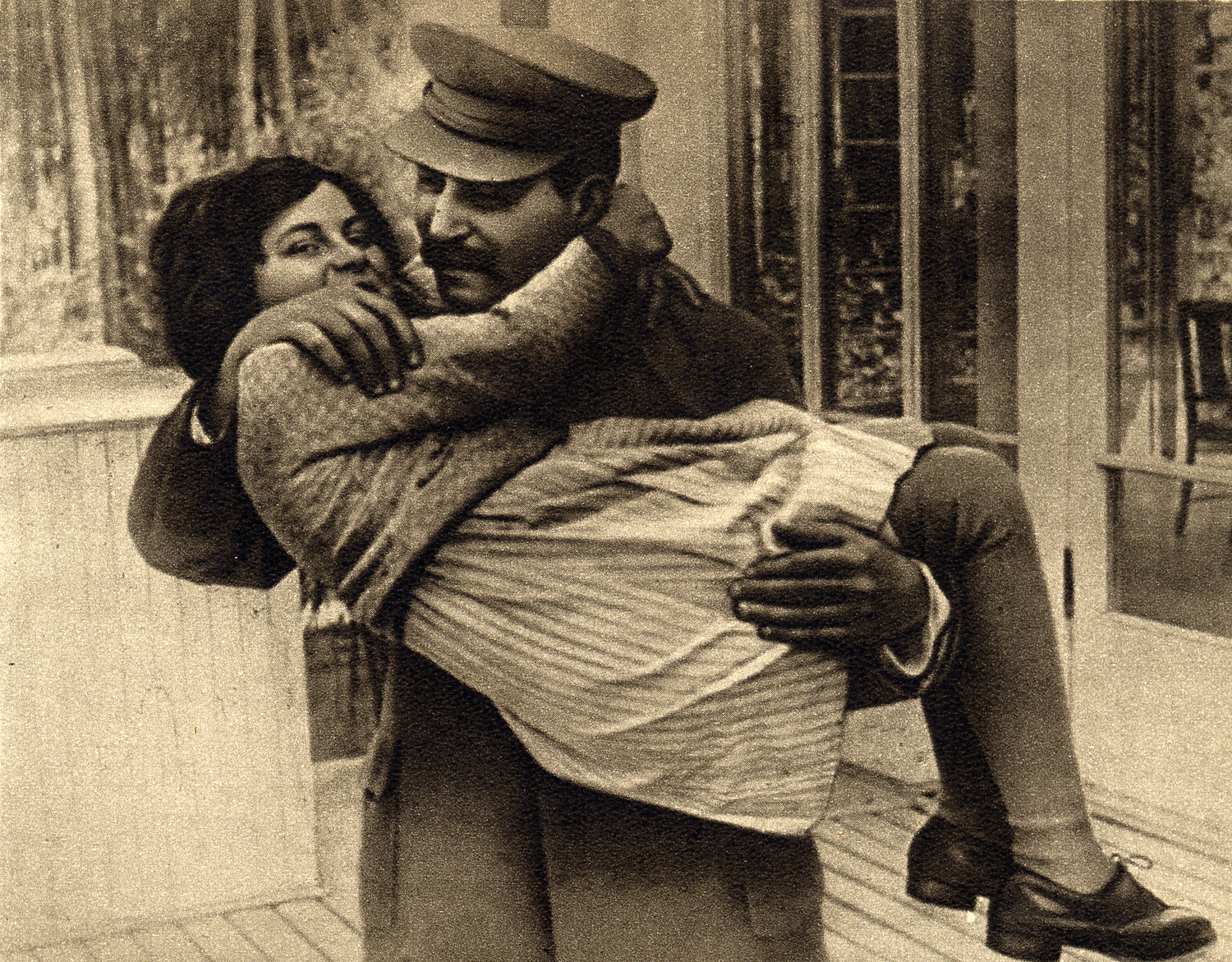
Stalin carrying his daughter Svetlana in 1935

Stalin married his first wife, Ekaterina Svanidze, in 1906. Volkogonov suggested that she was "probably the one human being he had really loved". When she died in 1907, Stalin allegedly said: "This creature softened my heart of stone. She died and with her died my last warm feelings for humanity." They had a son, Yakov, who frequently frustrated and annoyed Stalin. After Yakov was captured by the German Army during World War II, Stalin refused to agree to a prisoner exchange between him and German field marshal Friedrich Paulus, and Yakov died at a Nazi concentration camp in 1943.

In exile in Solvychegodsk in 1910, Stalin had an affair with his landlady, Maria Kuzakova, who in 1911 gave birth to his alleged second son, Konstantin Kuzakov, who later taught philosophy at the Leningrad Military Mechanical Institute, but never met Stalin. In 1914, in Kureika, Stalin, aged 35, had a relationship with Lidiya Pereprygina, aged 14 (considered a minor at the time), who allegedly became pregnant with Stalin's child. In December 1914, Pereprygina gave birth to the child, although the infant died soon after. In 1916, Pereprygina was pregnant again. She gave birth to their alleged son, Alexander Davydov, around April 1917. He was raised as the son of a peasant fisherman; Stalin later came to know of the child's existence but showed no interest in him.

Stalin had a difficult relationship with his second wife, Nadezhda Alliluyeva, whom he married in 1919, as they often fought. They had two biological children—a son, Vasily, and daughter, Svetlana—and adopted another son, Artyom Sergeev, in 1921. Though it is unclear if Stalin had a mistress during or after this marriage, she suspected he was unfaithful, and died by suicide in 1932. Stalin regarded Vasily as spoiled and often chastised his behaviour; as Stalin's son, he was swiftly promoted through the Red Army and allowed a lavish lifestyle. Conversely, Stalin had an affectionate relationship with Svetlana during her childhood, and was very fond of Artyom. He disapproved of Svetlana's suitors and husbands, which put strain on their relationship. After World War II, he made little time for his children, and his family played a diminishing role in his life. After Stalin's death, Svetlana changed her surname to Alliluyeva, and defected to the US via India.

== Legacy ==
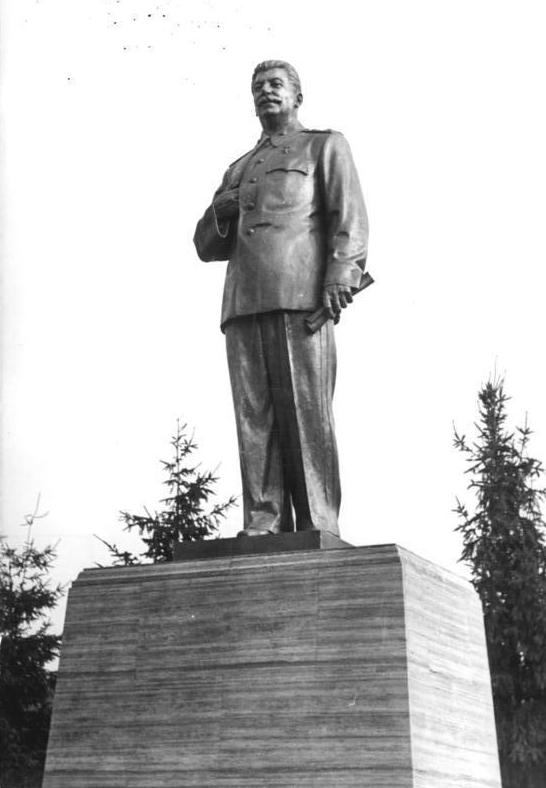
Statue of Stalin in East Berlin, 1951. It was removed in 1961 as part of de-Stalinisation.

Leninists remain divided in their views on Stalin; some view him as Lenin's authentic successor, while others believe he betrayed Lenin's ideas by deviating from them. The historian Robert Conquest stated that Stalin perhaps "determined the course of the twentieth century" more than any other individual. For most Westerners and anti-communist Russians, he is viewed overwhelmingly negatively as a mass murderer; for significant numbers of Russians and Georgians, he is regarded as a great statesman and state-builder. The historian Dmitri Volkogonov characterised him as "one of the most powerful figures in human history."

According to Service, Stalin strengthened and stabilised the Soviet Union. In under three decades, Stalin transformed the country into a major industrial world power, one which could "claim impressive achievements" in terms of urbanisation, military strength, education and Soviet pride. Under his rule, the average Soviet life expectancy grew due to improved living conditions, nutrition and medical care as mortality rates declined. Although millions of Soviet citizens despised him, support for Stalin was nevertheless widespread throughout Soviet society. Historian Geoffrey Roberts argues that despite Stalin's purges, gulags, deportations and forced collectivization and industrialization, his leadership was instrumental in the defeat of Nazism. Conversely, the historian Vadim Rogovin argued that Stalin's purges "caused losses to the communist movement both in the USSR and throughout the world from which the movement has not recovered to this very day". Similarly, Nikita Khrushchev believed his purges of the Old Bolsheviks and leading figures in the military and academia had "undoubtedly" weakened the nation.

Stalin's necessity for the Soviet Union's economic development has been questioned, and it has been argued that his policies from 1928 onwards may have been a limiting factor. Stalin's Soviet Union has been characterised as a totalitarian state, with Stalin its authoritarian leader. Various biographers have described him as a dictator, an autocrat, or accused him of practising Caesarism. Montefiore argued that while Stalin initially ruled as part of a Communist Party oligarchy, the government transformed into a personal dictatorship in 1934, with Stalin only becoming "absolute dictator" after March–June 1937, when senior military and NKVD figures were eliminated. In both the Soviet Union and elsewhere he came to be portrayed as an "Oriental despot". McDermott nevertheless cautioned against "over-simplistic stereotypes"—promoted in the fiction of writers like Aleksandr Solzhenitsyn—which portrayed Stalin as an omnipotent and omnipresent tyrant who controlled every aspect of Soviet life.

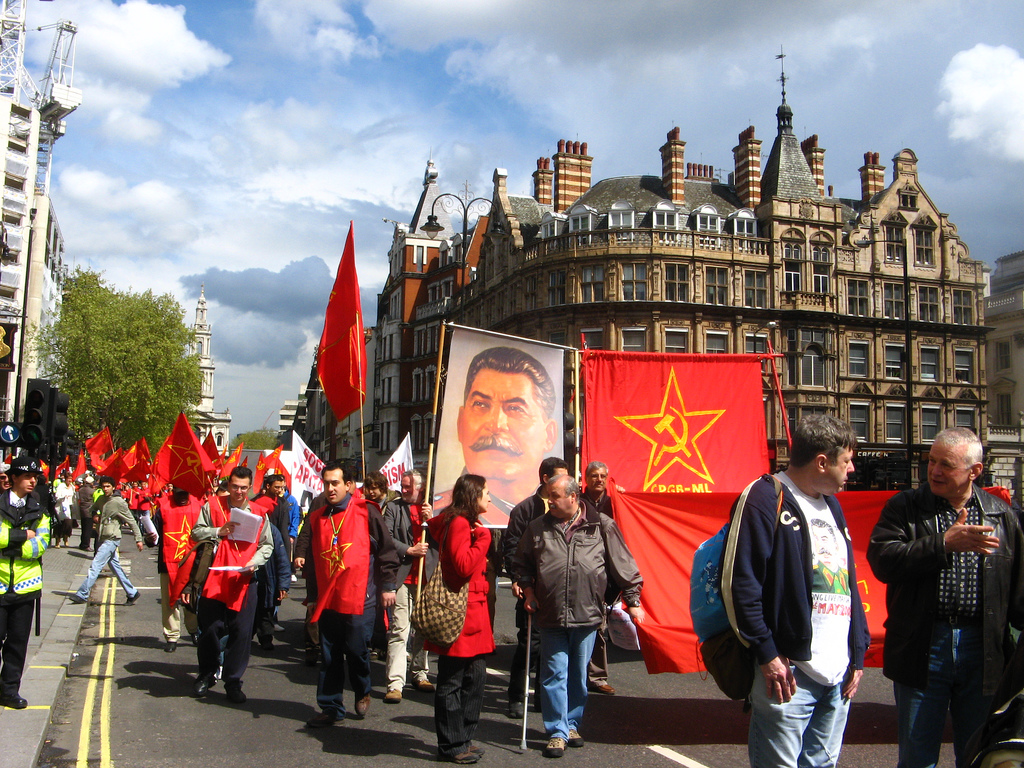
Supporters of the Communist Party of Great Britain carrying a banner of Stalin at a May Day march in London, 2008

A vast literature devoted to Stalin has been produced. During Stalin's lifetime, his approved biographies were largely hagiographic in content. Stalin ensured that these works gave very little attention to his early life, particularly because he did not wish to emphasise his Georgian origins in a state numerically dominated by Russians. Since his death many more biographies have been written, although until the 1980s these relied largely on the same sources of information. Under Mikhail Gorbachev's Soviet administration various previously classified files on Stalin's life were made available to historians, at which point he became "one of the most urgent and vital issues on the public agenda" in the Soviet Union. After the dissolution of the Union in 1991, the rest of the archives were opened to historians, resulting in much new information about Stalin coming to light, and producing a flood of new research. Indian politician M. Karunanidhi, an admirer of Stalin, named his son after him.

=== Death toll ===
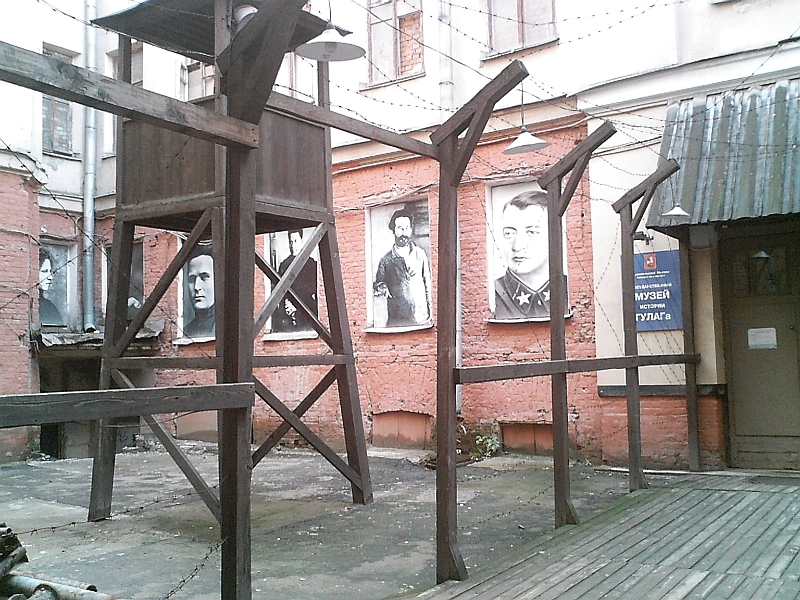
Interior of the Gulag Museum in Moscow

Before the dissolution of the Soviet Union and the archival revelations, some Western historians estimated that the numbers killed by Stalin's regime were 20 million or higher. The scholarly consensus affirms that Soviet archival materials declassified in 1991 contain irrefutable data much lower than Western sources used prior to 1991, such as statements from emigres and other informants. Based on these records, scholars have estimated that 1.8 million people were deported to remote regions of the country during Stalin's dekulakisation campaign, in addition to 1 million peasants and ethnic minorities deported in the 1930s, and 3.5 million people (mainly ethnic minorities) deported in the 1940s and 1950s, for a total of 6.3 million. The Soviet archives also contain official records of 799,455 executions from 1921 to 1953, around 1.5 to 1.7 million deaths in Gulag camps (out of an estimated 18 million people who passed through), some 390,000 deaths during the dekulakisation forced resettlement, and up to 400,000 deaths of persons deported during the 1940s, with a total of about 3.3 million officially recorded victims in these categories. According to the historian Stephen Wheatcroft, approximately 1 million of these deaths were "purposive" while the rest happened through neglect and irresponsibility.

The deaths of at least 3.5 to 6.5 million persons in the Soviet famine of 1932–1933 are sometimes, though not always, included with the victims of the Stalin era. Stalin has also been accused of genocide in the cases of forced population transfer of ethnic minorities across the Soviet Union and the Holodomor famine. However, the British historian Michael Ellman argues that mass deaths from famines should be placed in a different category than the repression victims, mentioning that throughout Russian history famines and droughts have been a common occurrence. Famines were widespread throughout the world in the 19th and 20th centuries in countries such as China, India, Ireland, and Russia. Ellman compared the behaviour of the Stalinist regime to that of the British government (towards Ireland and India) and the G8 in contemporary times, and Stalin's "behaviour was no worse than that of many rulers in the nineteenth and twentieth centuries".

=== In the Soviet Union and post-Soviet states ===
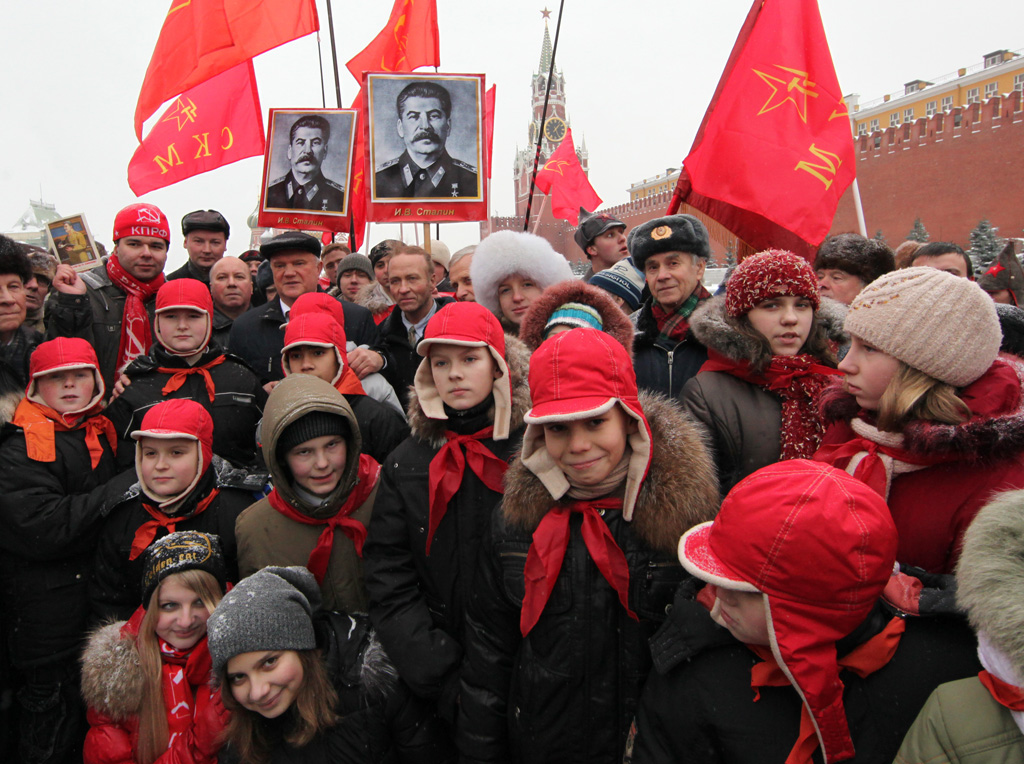
Marxist–Leninist activists from the Communist Party of the Russian Federation laying wreaths at Stalin's Moscow grave in 2009

Shortly after his death, the Soviet Union went through a period of de-Stalinisation. Malenkov denounced the Stalin personality cult, and the cult was subsequently criticised in Pravda. In 1956, Khrushchev gave his "Secret Speech", titled "On the Cult of Personality and Its Consequences", to a closed session of the Party's 20th Congress. There, Khrushchev denounced Stalin for both his mass repression and his personality cult. He repeated these denunciations at the 22nd Party Congress in October 1962. In October 1961, Stalin's body was removed from the mausoleum and buried in the Kremlin Wall Necropolis, the location marked by a bust. Stalingrad was renamed Volgograd that year.

Khrushchev's de-Stalinisation process ended when he was replaced as leader by Leonid Brezhnev in 1964; the latter introduced a level of re-Stalinisation within the Soviet Union. In 1969 and again in 1979, plans were proposed for a full rehabilitation of Stalin's legacy but on both occasions were halted due to fears of damaging the USSR's public image. Mikhail Gorbachev saw the total denunciation of Stalin as necessary for the regeneration of Soviet society.

After the fall of the Soviet Union in 1991, Boris Yeltsin continued Gorbachev's denunciation of Stalin but added to it a denunciation of Lenin. His successor, Vladimir Putin, did not seek to rehabilitate Stalin but emphasised the celebration of Soviet achievements under Stalin's leadership rather than the Stalinist repressions. In October 2017, Putin opened the Wall of Grief, a memorial to the victims of Stalin's repressions, in Moscow. Following the 2022 Russian invasion of Ukraine, the government and general public of Russia has been accused of rehabilitating Stalin. In May 2025, Russian authorities re-added a statue of Stalin at the Taganskaya metro station after the original was removed in 1966 as part of the 90th anniversary of the opening of the metro. In July, the Communist Party of the Russian Federation described Khrushchev's 1956 speech denouncing Stalin's cult of personality as a "mistake" and "politically biased", further urging Putin to restore "Stalingrad" as the official name of the Russian city of Volgograd.

Admiration for Stalin has remained consistently widespread in Georgia, although Georgian attitudes have been very divided. A number of Georgians resent criticism of Stalin, the most famous figure from their nation's modern history.

Additionally, Stalin is venerated as a folk saint by some in the Russian Orthodox Church.

== See also ==
- Outline of the Russian Revolution and Civil War
- Bibliography of the Russian Revolution and Civil War
- Bibliography of Stalinism and the Soviet Union
- Joseph Stalin bibliography
- Index of Old Bolsheviks
- Index of articles related to the Russian Revolution and Civil War
- List of places named after Joseph Stalin
- List of statues of Joseph Stalin

== Bibliography ==
=== Academic books and journals ===
- Bazhanov, Boris; Doyle, David W. (1990). Bazhanov and the Damnation of Stalin. Ohio University Press. ISBN 978-0-5850-7670-6.
- Brackman, Roman (2001). The Secret File of Joseph Stalin: A Hidden Life. Frank Cass Publishers. ISBN 978-0-7146-5050-0.
- Brackman, Roman (2004). The Secret File of Joseph Stalin: A Hidden Life. Frank Cass Publishers.
- Brent, Jonathan; Naumov, Vladimir (2004). Stalin's Last Crime: The Plot Against the Jewish Doctors, 1948–1953. HarperCollins. ISBN 978-0-0620-1367-5.
- Bullock, Alan (1992). Hitler and Stalin: Parallel Lives. Alfred A. Knopf.
- Chang, Jon K. (8 April 2019). "Ethnic Cleansing and Revisionist Russian and Soviet History". Academic Questions. 32 (2): 270. doi:10.1007/s12129-019-09791-8 (inactive 1 July 2025). S2CID 150711796.
- Conquest, Robert (1991). Stalin: Breaker of Nations. Penguin. ISBN 978-0-1401-6953-9.
- Conquest, Robert (2008). The Great Terror: A Reassessment (fortieth anniversary ed.). Oxford University Press. ISBN 978-0-1953-1699-5.
- Davies, Norman (2003) [1972]. White Eagle, Red Star: The Polish-Soviet War 1919–20 and 'the Miracle on the Vistula'. Pimlico. ISBN 978-0-7126-0694-3.
- Davies, Robert; Wheatcroft, Stephen (2004). The Industrialisation of Soviet Russia Volume 5: The Years of Hunger: Soviet Agriculture 1931–1933. Palgrave Macmillan. ISBN 978-0-2302-3855-8.
- Davies, Robert; Wheatcroft, Stephen (2006). "Stalin and the Soviet Famine of 1932–33: A Reply to Ellman" (PDF). Europe-Asia Studies. 58 (4): 625–633. doi:10.1080/09668130600652217. JSTOR 20451229. S2CID 145729808. Archived (PDF) from the original on 30 June 2019.
- Deutscher, Isaac (1966). Stalin (revised ed.). Penguin.
- Dović, Marijan; Helgason, Jón Karl, eds. (2019). Great Immortality: Studies on European Cultural Sainthood. National Cultivation of Culture. Vol. 18. ISBN 978-9-0043-9513-8. Archived from the original on 21 November 2022.
- Dower, Paul Castañeda; Markevich, Andrei (May 2018). "Labor Misallocation and Mass Mobilization: Russian Agriculture during the Great War" (PDF). The Review of Economics and Statistics. 100 (2): 245–259. doi:10.1162/REST_a_00726. S2CID 55486912. Archived (PDF) from the original on 18 June 2021.
- Ellman, Michael (2000). "The 1947 Soviet Famine and the Entitlement Approach to Famines". Cambridge Journal of Economics. 24 (5): 603–630. doi:10.1093/cje/24.5.603.
- Ellman, Michael (2002). "Soviet Repression Statistics: Some Comments" (PDF). Europe-Asia Studies. 54 (7): 1151–1172. doi:10.1080/0966813022000017177. S2CID 43510161. Archived (PDF) from the original on 25 May 2019.
- Ellman, Michael (2005). "The Role of Leadership Perceptions and of Intent in the Soviet Famine of 1931–1934" (PDF). Europe-Asia Studies. 57 (6): 823–841. doi:10.1080/09668130500199392. S2CID 13880089. Archived (PDF) from the original on 27 February 2009.
- Ellman, Michael (2007). "Stalin and the Soviet Famine of 1932–33 Revisited". Europe-Asia Studies. 59 (4): 663–693. doi:10.1080/09668130701291899. S2CID 53655536.
- Etinger, Iakov (1995). "The Doctors' Plot: Stalin's Solution to the Jewish Question". In Ro'i, Yaacov (ed.). Jews and Jewish Life in Russia and the Soviet Union. The Cummings Center Series. Frank Cass. pp. 103–124. ISBN 0-7146-4619-9.
- Fainsod, Jerry F.; Hough, Merle (1979). How the Soviet Union is Governed. Harvard University Press. ISBN 978-0-6744-1030-5.
- Foltz, Richard (2021). The Ossetes: Modern-Day Scythians of the Caucasus. Bloomsbury. ISBN 978-0-7556-1845-3. Archived from the original on 18 February 2023.
- Gaddis, John L. (2005). The Cold War: A New History. Penguin Press. ISBN 978-0-1430-3827-6.
- Gellately, Robert (2007). Lenin, Stalin, and Hitler: The Age of Social Catastrophe. Jonathan Cape. ISBN 978-0-2240-6283-1.
- Getty, J. Arch; Rittersporn, Gábor; Zemskov, Viktor (1993). "Victims of the Soviet penal system in the pre-war years: a first approach on the basis of archival evidence" (PDF). American Historical Review. 98 (4): 1017–1049. doi:10.2307/2166597. JSTOR 2166597. Archived (PDF) from the original on 6 December 2019.
- Glantz, David (1983). "August Storm: The Soviet 1945 Strategic Offensive in Manchuria" (PDF). Archived from the original (PDF) on 9 September 2017.
- Glantz, David (2001). "The Soviet-German War 1941–45 Myths and Realities: A Survey Essay" (PDF). Archived from the original (PDF) on 9 July 2011.
- Cheremukhin, Anton; Golosov, Mikhail; Guriev, Sergei; Tsyvinski, Aleh (2013). Was Stalin Necessary for Russia's Economic Development? (PDF). w19425. National Bureau of Economic Research. Archived (PDF) from the original on 22 August 2020.
- Fitzpatrick, Sheila (2015). On Stalin's Team: The Years of Living Dangerously in Soviet Politics. Melbourne University Press. ISBN 978-1-4008-7421-7.
- Harris, James (2017). The Great Fear: Stalin's Terror of the 1930s. Oxford University Press. ISBN 978-0-1987-9786-9.
- Haslam, Jonathan (1979). "The Comintern and the Origins of the Popular Front 1934–1935". The Historical Journal. 22 (3): 673–691. doi:10.1017/s0018246x00017039. S2CID 159573290.
- Healey, Dan (1 June 2018). "GOLFO ALEXOPOULOS. Illness and Inhumanity in Stalin's Gulag". The American Historical Review. 123 (3): 1049–1051. doi:10.1093/ahr/123.3.1049. Archived from the original on 8 July 2018.
- Hass, Jeffrey K. (2025) "A study in leadership contrasts: Leon Trotsky and Joseph Stalin." in Case Studies in Political Leadership (Edward Elgar), pp. 199–208. online
- Himmer, Robert (1986). "On the Origin and Significance of the Name "Stalin"". The Russian Review. 45 (3): 269–286. doi:10.2307/130111. JSTOR 130111.
- Khlevniuk, Oleg V. (2015). Stalin: New Biography of a Dictator. Translated by Nora Seligman Favorov. Yale University Press. ISBN 978-0-3001-6388-9.
- Kotkin, Stephen (2014). Stalin: Paradoxes of Power, 1878–1928. Allen Lane. ISBN 978-0-7139-9944-0.
- Kotkin, Stephen (2017). Stalin: Waiting for Hitler, 1929–1941. Allen Lane. ISBN 978-0-7139-9945-7.
- Kuromiya, Hiroaki (2008). "The Soviet Famine of 1932–1933 Reconsidered". Europe-Asia Studies. 60 (4): 663–675. doi:10.1080/09668130801999912. JSTOR 20451530. S2CID 143876370.
- Li, Hua-yu (2009). "Reactions of Chinese Citizens to the Death of Stalin: Internal Communist Party Reports". Journal of Cold War Studies. 11 (2): 70–88. doi:10.1162/jcws.2009.11.2.70. S2CID 57561115. Archived from the original on 24 June 2016.
- McCauley, Martin (2003). Stalin and Stalinism (third ed.). Pearson. ISBN 978-0-5825-0587-2.
- McDermott, Kevin (1995). "Stalin and the Comintern during the 'Third Period', 1928–33". European History Quarterly. 25 (3): 409–429. doi:10.1177/026569149502500304. S2CID 144922280.
- McDermott, Kevin (2006). Stalin: Revolutionary in an Era of War. Palgrave Macmillan. ISBN 978-0-3337-1122-4.
- Sebag Montefiore, Simon (2003). Stalin: The Court of the Red Tsar. Weidenfeld & Nicolson. ISBN 978-1-8421-2726-1.
- Sebag Montefiore, Simon (2007). Young Stalin. Weidenfeld & Nicolson. ISBN 978-0-2978-5068-7.
- Moore, Rebekah (2012). "'A Crime Against Humanity Arguably Without Parallel in European History': Genocide and the "Politics" of Victimhood in Western Narratives of the Ukrainian Holodomor". Australian Journal of Politics & History. 58 (3): 367–379. doi:10.1111/j.1467-8497.2012.01641.x.
- Nekrich, Alexander (1997). Pariahs, Partners, Predators: German-Soviet Relations, 1922–1941. Columbia University Press. ISBN 0-2311-0676-9.
- Ra'anan, Uri, ed. (2006). Flawed Succession: Russia's Power Transfer Crises. Lexington Books. ISBN 978-0-7391-1403-2. Archived from the original on 1 January 2021.
- Overy, Richard J. (2004). The Dictators: Hitler's Germany and Stalin's Russia. Allen Lane. ISBN 978-0-3930-2030-4.
- Pinkus, Benjamin (1984). The Soviet Government and the Jews 1948–1967: A Documented Study. Cambridge University Press. ISBN 978-0-5212-4713-9.
- Rappaport, Helen (1999). Joseph Stalin: A Biographical Companion. ABC-Clio. ISBN 978-1-5760-7084-0.
- Rieber, Alfred J. (2005). "Stalin as Georgian: The Formative Years". In Davies, Sarah; James Harris (eds.). Stalin: A New History. Cambridge University Press. pp. 18–44. ISBN 978-1-1394-4663-1.
- Rees, E. A. (15 October 2013). Iron Lazar: A Political Biography of Lazar Kaganovich. Anthem Press. p. 219. ISBN 978-1-7830-8057-1. Archived from the original on 30 June 2023.
- Roberts, Geoffrey (1992). "The Soviet Decision for a Pact with Nazi Germany". Soviet Studies. 55 (2): 57–78. doi:10.1080/09668139208411994. JSTOR 152247.
- Roberts, Geoffrey (2002). "Stalin, the Pact with Nazi Germany, and the Origins of Postwar Soviet Diplomatic Historiography". Journal of Cold War Studies. 4 (4): 93–103. doi:10.1162/15203970260209527. S2CID 57563511.
- Roberts, Geoffrey (2006). Stalin's Wars: From World War to Cold War, 1939–1953. Yale University Press. ISBN 978-0-3001-5040-7.
- Roberts, Geoffrey (2022). Stalin's Library: A Dictator and His Books. Yale University Press. ISBN 978-0-3001-7904-0. Archived from the original on 3 February 2024.
- Rosefielde, Steven (September 1996). "Stalinism in Post-Communist Perspective: New Evidence on Killings, Forced Labour and Economic Growth in the 1930s". Europe-Asia Studies. 48 (6): 959–987. doi:10.1080/09668139608412393.
- Sandle, Mark (1999). A Short History of Soviet Socialism. UCL Press. doi:10.4324/9780203500279. ISBN 978-1-8572-8355-6.
- Semeraro, David A. S. (2017). Joseph Stalin. Pen & Sword Books. ISBN 978-1-5267-0205-0. Archived from the original on 7 April 2023.
- Service, Robert (2000). Lenin: A Biography. Macmillan. ISBN 978-0-3337-2625-9.
- Service, Robert (2004). Stalin: A Biography. Macmillan. ISBN 978-0-3337-2627-3.
- Snyder, Timothy (2010). Bloodlands: Europe between Hitler and Stalin. Vintage Books. ISBN 978-1-4070-7550-1.
- Suny, Ronald (2020b). Red Flag Wounded. Verso Books. p. 59. ISBN 978-1-7887-3074-7. Archived from the original on 13 August 2023.
- Suny, R. G. (2020). Stalin: Passage to Revolution. Princeton University Press. excerpt Archived 19 November 2020 at the Wayback Machine
- Volkogonov, Dimitri (1991). Stalin: Triumph and Tragedy. Translated by Shukman, Harold. Weidenfeld and Nicolson. ISBN 978-0-2978-1080-3.
- Wettig, Gerhard (2008). Stalin and the Cold War in Europe. Rowman & Littlefield. ISBN 978-0-7425-5542-6.
- Wheatcroft, Stephen (1996). "The Scale and Nature of German and Soviet Repression and Mass Killings, 1930–45" (PDF). Europe-Asia Studies. 48 (8): 1319–1353. doi:10.1080/09668139608412415. JSTOR 152781. Archived (PDF) from the original on 17 July 2011.
- Wheatcroft, Stephen (1999). "The Great Leap Upwards: Anthropometric Data and Indicators of Crises and Secular Change in Soviet Welfare Levels, 1880–1960". Slavic Review. 58 (1): 27–60. doi:10.2307/2672986. JSTOR 2672986. PMID 22368819. S2CID 43228133.

=== Magazines, newspapers, and websites ===
- Allilueva, Svetlana (1967), Twenty Letters to a Friend, translated by Johnson, Priscilla, London: Hutchinson, ISBN 0-060-10099-0
- "Joseph Stalin: An Address Given by the Rev. Stanley Evans, M.A., at a Memorial Service for Joseph Stalin at the Church of St. George, Queen Square, London, on March 13th, 1953".
  • "[online]". Society of Socialist Clergy and Ministers. 1953. Archived from the original on 11 August 2022 – via anglicanhistory.org, transcribed by Richard Mammana 2019.
  • "[online]". Archived from the original on 21 November 2022.
- Bakradze, Lasha; Gudjov, Lev; Lipman, Maria; Wall, Thomas (1 March 2013). "The Stalin Puzzle: Deciphering Post-Soviet Public Opinion". Carnegie Endowment for International Peace. Archived from the original on 2 April 2017.
- Bell, Bethany (5 March 2013). "Georgia Divided Over Stalin 'Local Hero' Status in Gori". BBC. Archived from the original on 19 July 2018.
- Coynash, Halya (22 June 2021). "Russians name Stalin as the most 'outstanding' figure of all times". Kharkiv Human Rights Protection Group. Archived from the original on 21 June 2021.
- Lentine, Gina (15 January 2022). "Moscow's Memory Wars: Putin seeks to whitewash Russia's Stalinist past". Atlantic Council. Archived from the original on 25 June 2022.
- Luhn, Alec (16 April 2019). "Record 70 Percent of Russians Say Stalin Played a Positive Role in Their Country's History". The Daily Telegraph. Archived from the original on 30 November 2020.
- Masci, David (29 June 2017). "In Russia, Nostalgia for USSR and Positive Feelings about Stalin". Pew Research Center. Archived from the original on 29 November 2020.
- Sebag Montefiore, Simon (6 September 2007). "Stalin, his father and the Rabbit". The New Statesman. Archived from the original on 8 August 2022.
- Nemtsova, Anna (17 May 2021). "'The best master': Russia's new Stalin Center evokes pride, revulsion". NBC News. Archived from the original on 25 June 2022.
- "Poll Finds Stalin's Popularity High". The Moscow Times. 2 March 2013. Archived from the original on 20 March 2017.
- Rutland, Peter (13 June 2019). "Perspective – Putin's dangerous campaign to rehabilitate Stalin". Washington Post. Archived from the original on 4 October 2021.
- Snyder, Timothy D. (26 May 2010). "Springtime for Stalin". The New York Review of Books. Archived from the original on 24 October 2012.
- Snyder, Timothy D. (27 January 2011). "Hitler vs. Stalin: Who Was Worse?". The New York Review of Books. Archived from the original on 12 October 2017.
- Taylor, Adam (15 February 2017). "Positive Views of Stalin among Russian Reach 16-year High, Poll Shows". The Washington Post. Archived from the original on 20 March 2017.
- "Wall of Grief: Putin Opens First Soviet Victims Memorial". BBC. 5 June 2018. Archived from the original on 5 June 2018.
- "Why So Many Russian like Dictator Stalin". BBC News. 18 April 2019. Archived from the original on 19 July 2019.
- Yegorov, Oleg (15 December 2017). "Why did the USSR help to create Israel, but then became its foe". Russia Beyond. Archived from the original on 4 February 2022.
- "Do Stalina pozytyvno stavlyatʹsya menshe 1/5 ukrayintsiv" До Сталіна позитивно ставляться менше 1/5 українців [Less Than 1/5 of Ukrainians Have a Positive Attitude Towards Stalin]. Ukrayinska Pravda (in Ukrainian). 4 March 2015. Archived from the original on 5 March 2016.
- "О присвоении Верховному Главнокомандующему вооруженными силами СССР Сталину И. В. военного звания Маршала Советского Союза" [On the assignment of the military rank of Marshal of the Soviet Union to the Supreme Commander of the Armed Forces of the USSR Stalin I.V.] (PDF). Ведомости Верховного Совета СССР [Journal of the Supreme Soviet of the USSR] (in Russian). 13 March 1943. Archived (PDF) from the original on 20 November 2021.

Political offices
Preceded by Vyacheslav Molotov	Chairman of the Council of Ministers (Soviet Union); Council of People's Commissars until 1946; 1941–1953	Succeeded by Georgy Malenkov
Preceded by Semyon Timoshenko	Minister of Defence of the Soviet Union; People's Commissar until 1946; 1941–1947	Succeeded by Nikolai Bulganin
Party political offices
Preceded by Vyacheslav Molotov as Responsible Secretary	General Secretary of the Central Committee of the Communist Party of the Soviet Union; 1922–1952	Succeeded by Nikita Khrushchev as First Secretary
