= Stalin during the Russian Revolution, Civil War, and Polish–Soviet War =

Overview of Joseph Stalin during 1917–1920

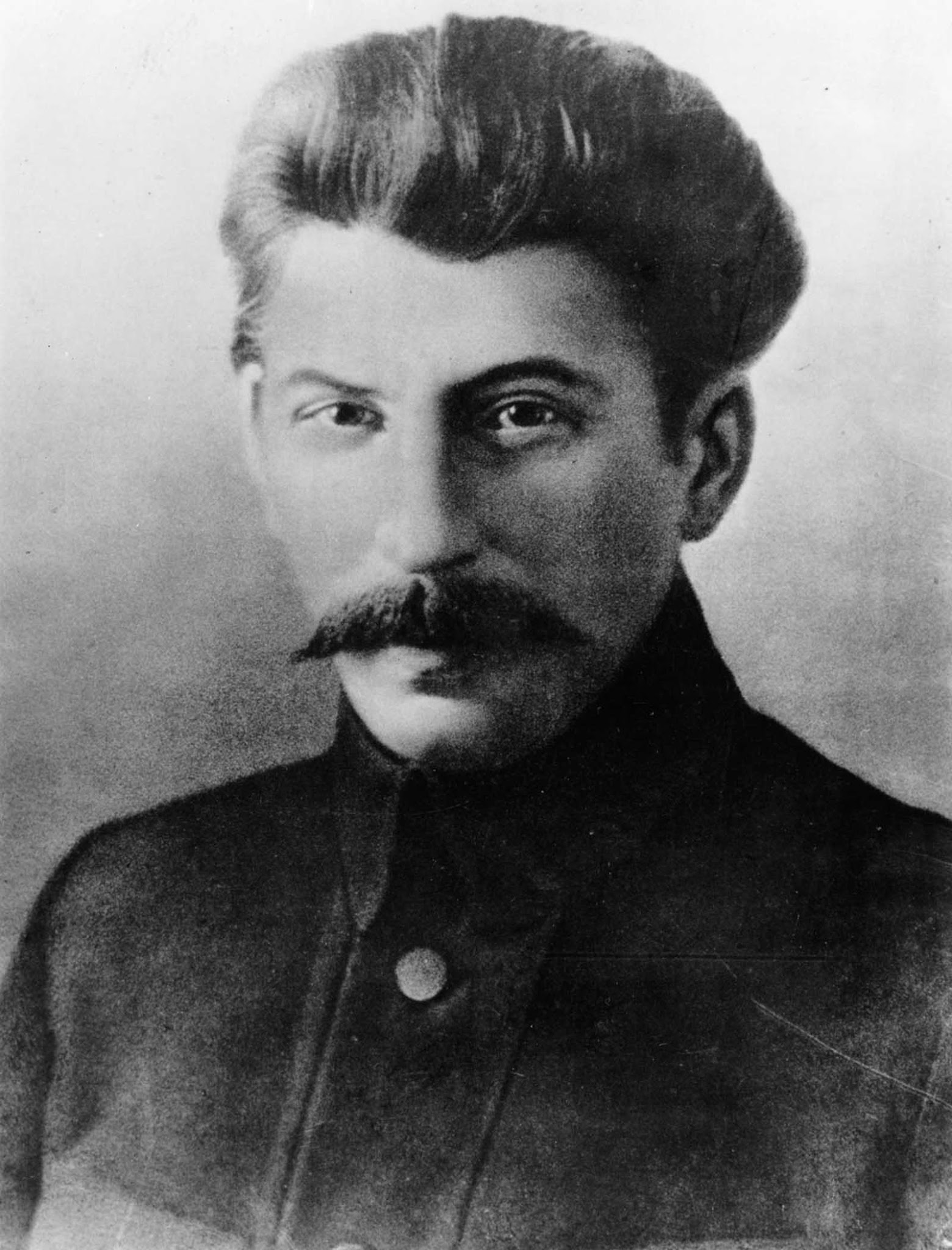
Stalin in 1917 as People's Commissar for Nationalities

Joseph Stalin was the General Secretary of the Communist Party of the Soviet Union's Central Committee from 1922 until his death in 1953. In the years following Vladimir Lenin's death in 1924, he rose to become the leader of the Soviet Union.

After growing up in Georgia, Stalin conducted activities for the Bolshevik party for twelve years before the Russian Revolution of 1917. He had been involved in a number of criminal activities as a robber, gangster, and arsonist. After being elected to the Bolshevik Central Committee in April 1917, Stalin helped Lenin to evade capture by authorities and ordered the besieged Bolsheviks to surrender to avoid a bloodbath. The Bolsheviks then seized Petrograd and Stalin was appointed People's Commissar for Nationalities' Affairs.

In the Civil War that followed between Lenin's Red Army against the White Army, Stalin formed alliances with Kliment Voroshilov and Semyon Budyonny while leading troops in the Caucasus. There, he ordered the killings of former Tsarist officers and counter-revolutionaries. After their Civil War victory, the Bolsheviks moved to expand the revolution into Europe, starting with Poland, which was fighting the Red Army in Ukraine. As joint commander of an army in Ukraine, Stalin's actions in the war were later criticized, including by Leon Trotsky.

== Background ==
Stalin was born on December 18, 1878 Gori, Georgia to a family of limited financial means. He was the fourth child born to the family of Ekaterina Gheladze and Vissarion Djugashvili; the prior three children of the couple had died at an early age. Stalin later became politically active and, during the Russian Revolution of 1905, organized and armed Bolshevik militias across Georgia, running protection rackets and waging guerrilla warfare. After meeting Vladimir Lenin at a Bolshevik conference in 1906 and marrying Ekaterina Svanidze, with whom he had a son Yakov, Stalin temporarily resigned from the party over its ban on bank robberies. Embarking on an effort to organize Muslim Azeri and Persian partisans in the Caucasus, Stalin conducted a range of criminal activities until arrest and exile in 1908. He fulfilled these activities through his formation of the Outfit, a criminal gang that were involved with armed robberies, racketeering, assassinations, arms procurement and child couriering.

Between 1908 and 1917, Stalin was arrested seven times and escaped five times, enjoying less than two years of liberty in the nine-year period.

== Role during the Russian Revolution ==
=== Supporting revolution and saving Lenin ===
In the wake of the February Revolution of 1917 (the first phase of the Russian Revolution of 1917), Stalin was released from exile. On March 25 he returned to Petrograd (Saint Petersburg) with just a typewriter and a wicker suitcase, wearing a suit he had on in 1913 when he was arrested. On March 28, together with Lev Kamenev and Matvei Muranov, Stalin ousted Vyacheslav Molotov and Alexander Shlyapnikov as editors of Pravda, the official Bolshevik newspaper, while Lenin and much of the Bolshevik leadership were still in exile. Stalin and the new editorial board took a position in favor of the Provisional Government (Molotov and Shlyapnikov had wanted to overthrow it) and went to the extent of declining to publish Lenin's 'letters from afar' arguing for the provisional government to be overthrown. He described them as "Unsatisfactory...a sketch with no facts."

For a week from March 12, Stalin stopped writing articles, this may have been when he switched to Lenin's position. However, after Lenin prevailed at the April Party conference, Stalin and the rest of the Pravda staff came on board with Lenin's view and called for overthrowing the provisional government. At this April 1917 Party conference, Stalin was elected to the Bolshevik Central Committee with 97 votes in the party, the third highest after Grigory Zinoviev and Lenin. These three plus Kamenev formed the Central Committee's Bureau. Stalin would share a flat with Molotov where he apologised: "You were the nearest of all to Lenin in the initial stage in April."

On June 24, Stalin threatened to resign when Lenin turned against the idea of an armed demonstration when the Soviets refused to support it. It went ahead anyway on July 1 and was a Bolshevik triumph.

In mid-July, armed mobs led by Bolshevik militants took to the streets of Petrograd, killing army officers and who were considered bourgeois civilians. Sailors from Kronstadt phoned Stalin asking if an armed uprising was feasible. He said: "Rifles? You comrades know best." This was enough encouragement for them. They demanded the overthrow of the government, but neither the Bolshevik leadership nor the Petrograd Soviet was willing to take power, having been totally surprised by this unplanned revolt. After the disappointed mobs dispersed, Alexander Kerensky's government struck back at the Bolsheviks. Loyalist troops raided Pravda on July 18 and surrounded the Bolshevik headquarters. Stalin helped Lenin evade capture minutes before and, to avoid a bloodbath, ordered the besieged Bolsheviks in the Peter and Paul Fortress to surrender.

Stalin put Lenin in five different hiding places, the last being the Alliluyev family apartment. Convinced Lenin would be killed if caught, Stalin persuaded him not to surrender and smuggled him to Finland. He shaved off Lenin's beard and moustache, took him to Primorsky station then to a shack north of Petrograd, then to a barn in Finland. In Lenin's absence, Stalin assumed leadership of the Bolsheviks. At the Sixth Congress of the Bolshevik Party, held secretly in Petrograd, Stalin gave the main report, was chosen to be the chief editor of the Party press and a member of the Constituent Assembly, and was re-elected to the Central Committee.

=== Coup of General Lavr Kornilov in August 1917 ===
In September [O.S. August] 1917, Kerensky suspected his newly appointed Commander-in-Chief, General Lavr Kornilov, of planning a coup and dismissed him (10 September [O.S. 28 August] 1917). Believing that Kerensky had acted under Bolshevik pressure, Kornilov decided to march his troops on Petrograd. In desperation, Kerensky turned to the Petrograd Soviet for help and released the Bolsheviks, who raised a small army to defend the capital. In the end, Kerensky convinced Kornilov's army to stand down and to disband without violence.

=== October Revolution ===
The Bolsheviks now found themselves free, rearmed, swelling with new recruits and under Stalin's firm control, whilst Kerensky had few troops loyal to him in the capital. Lenin decided that the time for a coup had arrived. Kamenev and Zinoviev proposed a coalition with the Mensheviks, but Stalin and Leon Trotsky backed Lenin's wish for an exclusively Bolshevik government. Lenin returned to Petrograd in October. On October 23, the Central Committee voted 10–2 in favor of an insurrection; Kamenev and Zinoviev voted in opposition.

On the morning of 6 November [O.S. 24 October] 1917, Kerensky's troops raided Stalin's press headquarters and smashed his printing presses. While he worked to restore his presses, Stalin missed a Central Committee meeting where assignments for the coup were being issued. Stalin instead spent the afternoon briefing Bolshevik delegates and passing communications to and from Lenin, who was in hiding.

Early the next day, Stalin went to the Smolny Institute from where he, Lenin and the rest of the Central Committee coordinated the coup. Kerensky left the capital to rally the Imperial troops at the German front. By 8 November [O.S. 26 October] 1917, the Bolsheviks had "stormed" the Winter Palace and arrested most of the members of Kerensky's cabinet.

== Establishing government ==
On 7 November (O.S. 26 October) 1917, Lenin officially proclaimed the existence of the new Bolshevik government, which became known as "Sovnarkom". Stalin was not yet well known to the Russian public, but was included on a list of new People's Commissars—effectively government ministers—under the name of "J. V. Djugashvili-Stalin". Stalin moved into the Smolny Institute, where Sovnarkom was then based. It was probably Lenin who had proposed Stalin for the position of People's Commissar of Nationalities, and while Stalin had initially turned down the post, he ultimately relented. He and Yakov Sverdlov were also tasked with ensuring that Petrograd was defended from Kerensky's Cossack forces which had rallied in the Pulkovo Heights.

During the first few months of the new government, Lenin, Stalin, and Trotsky formed what the historian Simon Sebag Montefiore described as an "inseparable troika". Lenin recognised both Stalin and Trotsky as "men of action" who stood out in this regard from many of the other senior Bolsheviks. On 29 November, the Bolshevik Central Committee established a four-man Chetverka to lead the country; it consisted of Lenin, Stalin, Trotsky, and Sverdlov.

On 7 December, Lenin's government formed the Cheka, a political police force. On 27 October, they banned opposition press. Stalin supported the use of terror from the beginning; in response to a message from Estonian Bolsheviks suggesting how they could deal with opponents, he stated that "the idea of a concentration camp is excellent".

== Role in the Russian Civil War, 1917–1919 ==
Upon seizing Petrograd, the Bolsheviks formed the new revolutionary authority, the Council of People's Commissars. Stalin was appointed People's Commissar for Nationalities' Affairs; his job was to establish an institution to win over non-Russian citizens of the former Russian Empire. He was relieved of his post as editor of Pravda so that he could devote himself fully to his new role.

In March 1918, the Menshevik leader Julius Martov published an article exposing Bolshevik crimes committed before the revolution. Martov wrote that Stalin had organized bank robberies and had been expelled from his own party for doing so (the latter part is untrue). Stalin sued Martov for libel.

After seizing Petrograd, civil war broke out in Russia, pitting Lenin's Red Army against the White Army, a loose alliance of anti-Bolshevik forces. Lenin formed an eight-member Politburo which included Stalin and Trotsky. During this time, only Stalin and Trotsky were allowed to see Lenin without an appointment.

In May 1918, Lenin dispatched Stalin to the city of Tsaritsyn (later known as Stalingrad, now Volgograd). Situated on the Lower Volga, it was a key supply route to the oil and grain of the North Caucasus. There was a critical shortage of food in Russia, and Stalin was assigned to procure any he could find according to Prodrazvyorstka policy. The city was also in danger of falling to the White Army. He opposed the "military specialists"— former Tsarist professional military officers— and formed the "Tsaritsyn group," a loose group of like-minded Bolshevik military leaders and party members personally loyal to Stalin. In doing so, he first met and befriended Kliment Voroshilov and Semyon Budyonny, both of whom would become two of Stalin's key supporters in the military. Through his new allies, he imposed his influence on the military; in July Lenin granted his request for official control over military operations in the region to fight the Battle for Tsaritsyn.

Stalin challenged many of the decisions of Trotsky, who at this time was Chairman of the Revolutionary Military Council of the Republic and thus his military superior. He ordered the killings of many former Tsarist officers in the Red Army; Trotsky, in agreement with the Central Committee, had hired them for their expertise, but Stalin distrusted them, seizing documents which showed many were agents for the White Army. This created friction between Stalin and Trotsky. Stalin even wrote to Lenin asking that Trotsky be relieved of his post.

Stalin ordered the executions of any suspected counter-revolutionaries. In the countryside, he burned villages to intimidate the peasantry into submission and discourage bandit raids on food shipments.

In May 1919, Stalin was dispatched to the Western Front, near Petrograd. To stem mass desertions and defections of Red Army soldiers, Stalin had deserters and renegades rounded up and publicly executed as traitors.

== Role in the Polish-Soviet War, 1919–1920 ==
After the Bolsheviks turned the tide and were winning the civil war in late 1919, Lenin and many others wanted to expand the revolution westwards into Europe, starting with Poland, which was fighting the Red Army in Byelorussia and Ukraine. Stalin, in Ukraine at the time, argued these ambitions were unrealistic but lost. He was briefly transferred to the Caucasus in February 1920, but managed to get transferred back to Ukraine in May where he accepted the position of the Commissar of the South-West Front (commander Alexander Yegorov).

In late July 1920, Yegorov moved against the then-Polish city of Lwów, which conflicted with the general strategy set by Lenin and Trotsky by drawing his troops further away from the forces advancing on Warsaw. In mid-August, the Commander-in-Chief Sergei Kamenev ordered the transfer of troops (1st Cavalry Army, commanded by Semyon Budyonny and Kliment Voroshilov) from Yegorov's forces to reinforce the attack on Warsaw led by Mikhail Tukhachevsky. Stalin refused to counter-sign the order because it did not have the requisite two signatures on it. In the end, the battles for both Lwów and Warsaw were lost, and Stalin's actions were held partly to blame.

Richard Pipes suggested Lenin was more to blame, for ordering Soviet troops south to spread the revolution to Romania, and north to secure the Polish corridor for Germany (this would win over German nationalists). Both these diversions weakened the Soviet assault. Much blame must be laid on the overall commander, Sergei Kamenev, for permitting insubordination from both front commanders and conflicting and ever-changing strategic orders during the critical phase in the attack on Warsaw.

Stalin returned to Moscow in August 1920, where he defended himself before the Politburo by attacking the whole campaign strategy. Although this tactic worked, he nonetheless resigned his military commission, something he had repeatedly threatened to do when he did not get his way. At the Ninth Party Conference on September 22, Trotsky openly criticized Stalin's war record. Stalin was accused of insubordination, personal ambition, military incompetence and seeking to build his own reputation by victories on his own front at the expense of operations elsewhere. Neither he nor anybody else challenged these attacks; he only briefly reaffirmed his position that the war itself was a mistake, something which everybody agreed on by this point.

== Bibliography ==
- Montefiore, Simon Sebag (2004). Stalin: The Court of the Red Tsar. New York: Knopf. ISBN 978-1400042302.
- Montefiore, Simon Sebag (2007). Young Stalin. New York: Knopf. ISBN 978-1400044658.
- Kotkin, Stephen (2014). Stalin: Paradoxes of Power, 1878-1928. New York: Penguin. ISBN 978-1594203794.
- Service, Robert (2006). Stalin: A Biography. Cambridge, MA: Harvard University Press. ISBN 978-0674022584.
- Suny, Ronald Grigor (2020). Stalin: Passage to Revolution. Princeton: Princeton University Press. ISBN 978-0691182032.
- Figes, Orlando (1998). A People's Tragedy: The Russian Revolution, 1891-1924. New York: Viking. ISBN 978-0140243642.
- McMeekin, Sean (2017). The Russian Revolution: A New History. New York: Basic Books. ISBN 978-0465039906.
- Smith, Stephen Anthony (2017). Russia in Revolution: An Empire in Crisis, 1890 to 1928. New York: Oxford University Press. ISBN 978-0198734826.
- Engelstein, Laura (2018). Russia in Flames: War, Revolution, Civil War, 1914-1921. New York: Oxford University Press. ISBN 978-0199794218.

Primary Sources

- Trotsky, Leon (2008). History of the Russian Revolution. Haymarket Books. ISBN 978-1931859455.
