= The Romanovs: 1613–1918 =

History book by Simon Sebag Montefiore

- First edition (UK)
- Author: Simon Sebag Montefiore
- Audio read by: Simon Russell Beale
- Language: English
- Subject: House of Romanov
- Genre: Russian History
- Published: 2016
- Publisher: W & N (UK); Knopf (US)
- Publication place: United Kingdom
- Media type: Audiobook; Hardcover; Paperback
- Pages: 744

The Romanovs: 1613–1918 is a 2016 history book by Simon Sebag Montefiore. The book is about the Romanov Dynasty which lasted from 1613 until the monarchy was abolished in 1917.

== See also ==
- Jerusalem: The Biography
- Stalin: The Court of the Red Tsar
