= Zhemchuzhina =

Zhemchuzhina means pearl in Russian and may refer to

- Polina Zhemchuzhina (1897–1970), Soviet politician, wife of Vyacheslav Molotov
- FC Zhemchuzhina Budyonnovsk, a Russian football club
- FC Zhemchuzhina-Sochi, a Russian football club
- FC Zhemchuzhina Yalta, a former Ukrainian football club
