= Karl Pauker =

NKVD officer (1893–1937)

- Карл Па́укер
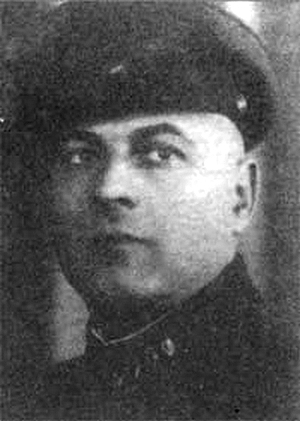
- Born: 30 January 1893; Lemberg, Austria-Hungary
- Died: August 14, 1937 (aged 44); Moscow, USSR

Karl Viktorovich Pauker (Russian: Карл Ви́кторович Па́укер; January 1893 – 14 August 1937) was an NKVD officer and head of Joseph Stalin's personal security until his arrest and execution.

Pauker was born into a Jewish family in Lemberg (modern-day Lviv), then part of Austria-Hungary. Prior to World War I he was a hairdresser working in the Budapest Opera house. He served in the Austro-Hungarian army and was taken as a prisoner of war by the Russians in 1916. Pauker elected to stay in Russia after the revolution and joined the Communist Party in 1918.

Pauker joined the Cheka and became Stalin's bodyguard in 1924. Pauker took an active part in the purges, including the executions of Grigory Zinoviev and Lev Kamenev. He himself became a victim of the Great Purge, arrested on 15 April 1937. According to Simon Sebag Montefiore, it was because he "knew too much and lived too well". He was executed quietly without trial on 14 August 1937. Pauker was not posthumously rehabilitated.

== Biography ==
Pauker was born on 30 January 1893 in the city of Lemberg within the Kingdom of Galicia and Lodomeria, in the Cisleithanian part of the dual monarchy of Austria-Hungary. His family were Jewish-Hungarians and prior to World War I, he worked as a hairdresser at the Budapest Opera house in Hungary. He served as part of the Austro-Hungarian army in World War I until he was captured as a prisoner-of-war by the Russians in 1916. Pauker ultimately decided to stay in Russia and joined the Bolshevik secret police, the Cheka.

For the members of the Politburo, Pauker became a source to get delicacies, cars, and other products that were difficult to attain. He may have also provided Stalin, Mikhail Kalinin and Kliment Voroshilov with girls.

Pauker played a role in the funerals of several prominent Soviets. Stalin assigned Pauker with Dora Khazan (wife of Andrey Andreyev) and Avel Yenukidze to preside over the funeral commission for his second wife Nadezhda Alliluyeva, who committed suicide on 9 November 1932. In the funeral, Pauker was placed in charge of organising the two orchestras - one being military and the other a theatrical orchestra of fifty instruments - that were going to play at the funeral. At the funeral of Sergei Kirov, assassinated on 1 December 1934, Pauker was in charge of the tight security at the Hall of Columns in the House of the Unions. After the death of writer Maxim Gorky on 18 June 1936, Stalin assigned Pauker to supervise the body's transfer from Gorki-10 in Moscow Oblast (west of Moscow city) to the Hall of Columns.

=== Relationship with Stalin ===
Pauker personally knew Stalin very well, more so than most party members. As he was constantly responsible for Stalin's safety, Pauker spent a lot of his time around him and came to know little details by studying Stalin's habits and taste. According to Alexander Orlov in his book The Secret History of Stalin's Crimes, Pauker had a pair of boots that made Stalin appear taller made and ensured that all coats for Stalin he ordered reached his heels. With experience as a former barber, he became Stalin's personal barber and would shave his face. Having become too distrustful of others, Pauker was the only person entrusted by Stalin to hold a blade to his neck. He effectively became part of Stalin's family.

Pauker also served as Stalin's comedian. He was an accomplished actor who performed characters with different accents, especially Jewish accents. Pauker had a rotund belly held in a frequently-mocked corset, loved elaborate OGPU uniforms, and would walk around on 11/2 inched-heeled boots. One of his gifts from Stalin was a Cadillac, which he showed off to Stalin's children.

A few weeks after Stalin's rivals Lev Kamenev and Grigory Zinoviev were both executed on 25 August 1936, Stalin and NKVD head Nikolai Yezhov were having dinner on December 20 to celebrate 19 years since the Cheka's founding in 1917. To entertain Stalin, Pauker re-enacted and mocked Zinoviev's execution. He was dragged into the room by two friends playing the role of the guards, with himself acting as Zinoviev. In Simon Sebag Montefiore's account of the scene, "he performed Zinoviev’s cries of ‘For God’s sake call Stalin’ but improvised another ingredient. Pauker, a Jew himself, … depicted Zinoviev raising his hands to the Heavens and weeping, “Hear oh Israel the Lord is our God, the Lord is one”. Stalin laughed so much that Pauker repeated it. Stalin was almost sick with merriment and waved at Pauker to stop." Stalin was amused, and described to have "laughed immoderately". Montefiore's account was supported by Robert Conquest and Donald Rayfield. In Christie Davies' analysis of the scene, it can be seen that Stalin "greatly enjoyed the humiliation of his political colleagues as well as opponents, particularly picking on and mocking those who were Jewish and would have relished Pauker’s willingness to demean himself by mocking the death agony of a fellow Jew in an antisemitic way." He had been present at Kamenev and Zinoviev's execution with Yezhov and the then NKVD head Genrikh Yagoda.

=== Relationship with Stalin's children ===
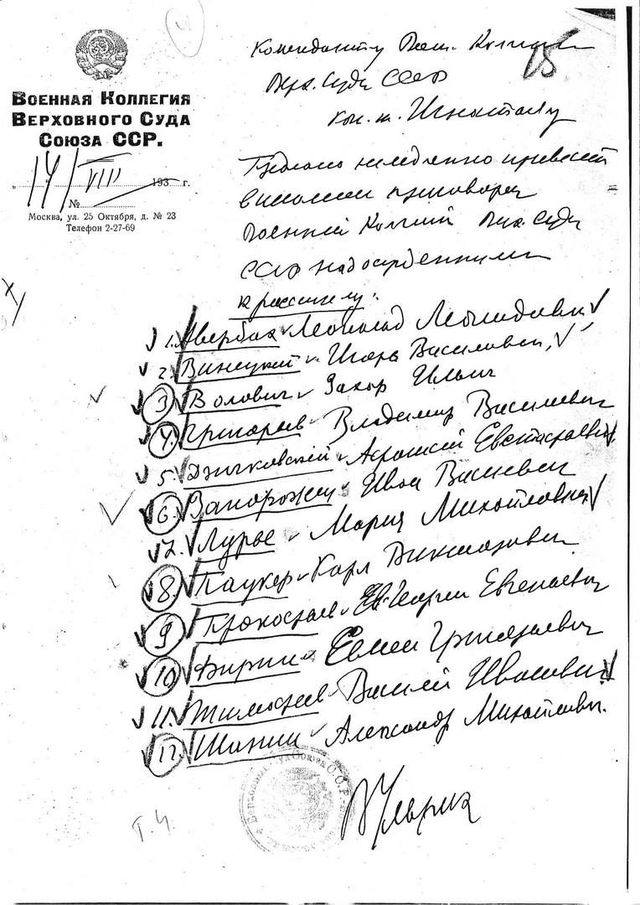
Vasiliy Ulrikh's proposal to the commandant of the Military Collegium of the USSR Armed Forces Ignatiev to immediately shoot 12 convicts, including Pauker (listed eighth).

Pauker was frequently around Stalin's children and would interact with them as they were used to Stalin's bodyguards who they considered part of the family. Pauker was particularly close to Stalin's youngest son Vasily. As described by Stalin's niece, Kira Alliluyeva, "Pauker was great fun. He liked children like all Jews and did not have a high opinion of himself". At Christmas, Pauker acted as Father Christmas for the children, delivering their presents and organising Christmas parties for them.

Vasily was severely traumatized by the death of his mother, Nadezhda, in 1932. As Stalin ceased to see his children after Nadezhda's death, Vasily spent his time with guards, including Pauker who supervised the boy and reported to Nikolai Vlasik - another of Stalin's bodyguards - who reported to Stalin. When Vasily's behaviour at school became impossible to control, Pauker wrote to Vlasik that his "removal to another school is absolutely necessary". Vasily would also write to Pauker. In one instance, he wrote "Hello Comrade Pauker. I'm fine...if you're not busy, come and see us. Comrade Pauker, I ask you to send me a bottle of ink for my pen." When Pauker's ink arrived, Vasily thanked him and also denounced Vlasik for accusing him of making another boy cry.

=== Arrest and execution ===
Despite his personal connections to Stalin, Pauker ultimately became a victim of the Great Purge. With the fall of Yagoda as the head of the NKVD and his arrest in March 1937, Yagoda began confessing to supposed crimes during an interrogation led by Yeshov. Among other things, he denounced Pauker. Pauker was subsequently dismissed as the chief of Stalin's bodyguard before being arrested on April 15, where he was accused of being a spy for Germany. According to Montefiore, it was because he "knew too much and lived too well". He was executed on 14 August 1937 when he was shot in the basement of the Lubyanka Building in Moscow. Pauker was the first courtier to die in the purge.
