= Stalin: The Court of the Red Tsar =

Non-fiction book by Simon Sebag Montefiore

- Author: Simon Sebag Montefiore
- Language: English
- Subject: History of the Soviet Union
- Genre: Popular history
- Publisher: Phoenix
- Publication date: 2003
- ISBN: 9781842127261

Stalin: The Court of the Red Tsar is a 2003 popular history book by Simon Sebag Montefiore. It focuses on the private life of the Soviet leader Joseph Stalin and his closest political associates from the late 1920s through to his death in 1953, covering the period of collectivization, the Moscow show trials, the purges, World War II and the beginning of the Cold War.

The research for the book privileged "letters, telegrams and diaries of [Stalin's] intimate associates" among the newly available archival material. It drew in particular on Stalin's papers from the Presidential Archive in the Russian State Archive of Socio-Political History, opened in 1999. Sebag Montefiore also conducted interviews with surviving descendants of Stalin's inner circle in Rostov-on-Don, Georgia and Abkhazia "about what they saw and heard as adolescent members of the Soviet elite".

The book discusses Stalin's "personal idiosyncrasies", including his tastes in food, footwear, architecture, "literature, music and history"), as well as his family life and mental health, and portrays him as "a man who liked to throw parties, flirt with women, play billiards, dandle babies on his knee and sing the Orthodox hymns of his youth". The Stalin circle is characterised as "macho, hard-drinking, powerful, and famous across the Imperium", as a group of "voluble, violent, and colourful political showmen", "an incestuous family, a web of lifelong friendships and enduring hatreds, shared love affairs, Siberian exiles and Civil War exploits" (p. 14).

Sebag Montefiore later wrote the companion piece Young Stalin, published in 2007.

== Reception ==
The book was judged to have succeeded in showing the importance of informal power under Stalin, and in evidencing how Stalin's political circle was reinforced by intermarriage and kinship ties. It was noted for its "vivid" depiction of "the general character of elite life" in Stalin's years and for the "significant" archival research behind it. It won History Book of the Year at the 2004 British Book Awards.

It was criticised for its imprecise and unreliable citations, for featuring invented dialogue, and for its sensationalistic emphasis on trivia and evocative story-telling. One reviewer questioned whether Sebag Montefiore could have accessed the archival collections referenced in the book.

Historian Sheila Fitzpatrick took issue with Sebag Montefiore's core metaphor in Stalin: The Court of the Red Tsar, that of "court politics", which implies a return of Tsarist autocracy in Communist disguise. She argued that Stalin's associates worked as a team of bureaucrats and socialised with him on equal terms, in contrast to ministers of the late Tsarist period or Muscovite nobles.

Unlike more standard biographies of Stalin, such as one by Robert Service, the book by Sebag Montefiore lends credibility to many disputable aspects of Stalin's life, such as his alleged work as an informant for Okhrana, suspected murder of his second wife Nadezhda Alliluyeva, or that he had always been an antisemite. Sebag Montefiore is found to differ from Service also in minimising the role of Stalin's personal choices and motivations behind the Great Purge, as he prefers to hold Bolsheviks as a group responsible for the crimes committed during Stalinism.

== See also ==
- Red Famine: Stalin's War on Ukraine
- Stalin: Breaker of Nations
- Stalin: Paradoxes of Power, 1878–1928
- Stalin: Waiting for Hitler, 1929–1941

== Bibliography ==
- Alexopoulos, Golfo (2008), "Review of Stalin: The Court of the Red Tsar by Simon Sebag Montefiore and of Stalin: A Biography by Robert Service", Journal of Cold War Studies, 10 (1): 132–136, doi:10.1162/jcws.2008.10.1.132, JSTOR 26926121
- Fitzpatrick, Sheila (2015), On Stalin's Team: The Years of Living Dangerously in Soviet Politics, Princeton, NJ: Princeton University Press, doi:10.2307/j.ctvc77n22, ISBN 978-0-691-14533-4
- Gill, Graeme (2007), "Review of Stalin: The Court of the Red Tsar by Simon Sebag Montefiore and of Stalin: A Biography by Robert Service", Journal of Modern History, 79 (3): 723–725, doi:10.1086/523254
- Kramer, Mark (2006), "Review of Stalin and His Hangmen: The Tyrant and Those Who Killed for Him by Donald Rayfield", Journal of Cold War Studies, 8 (1): 122–127, doi:10.1162/jcws.2006.8.1.122, JSTOR 26925890
- Prosser, Paul J. (2004), "Review of Stalin: The Court of the Red Tsar by Simon Sebag Montefiore", History, 89 (3): 491–492, JSTOR 24427798
- Ragsdale, Hugh (2004), "Review of Stalin: The Court of the Red Tsar by Simon Sebag Montefiore", Virginia Quarterly Review, 80 (2): 253, JSTOR 26445716
