= Stalin: Waiting for Hitler, 1929–1941 =

2017 biography of Joseph Stalin by Stephen Kotkin

Stalin: Waiting for Hitler
- Cover for Stalin: Waiting for Hitler
- Author: Stephen Kotkin
- Language: English
- Subject: Joseph Stalin, History of the Soviet Union, Stalinism.
- Genre: History, biography
- Published: 2017
- Publisher: Penguin Random House (print and digital), Recorded Books (audiobook)
- Publication place: United States
- Media type: Print, digital, audiobook
- Pages: 1184
- Preceded by: Stalin: Paradoxes of Power, 1878-1928
- Followed by: Stalin: Totalitarian Superpower, 1941-1990s
- Website: Penguin Random House

Stalin: Waiting for Hitler, 1929–1941 is the second volume in the three-volume biography of Joseph Stalin by American historian and Princeton Professor of History Stephen Kotkin. Stalin: Waiting for Hitler, 1929–1941 was originally published in October 2017 by Penguin Random House and then as an audiobook in December 2017 by Recorded Books. The first volume, Stalin: Paradoxes of Power, 1878–1928, was published in 2014 by Penguin Random House and the third and final volume, Totalitarian Superpower, is scheduled to be published in 2026.

The work is both a political biography recounting Stalin's life in the context of his involvement in Russian and later Soviet history and to a lesser degree a personal biography, detailing his private life, connecting it to his public life as revolutionary, leader, and dictator. The Independent writes in its review, Kotkin's biography "tends to history rather than biography."

== Synopsis ==
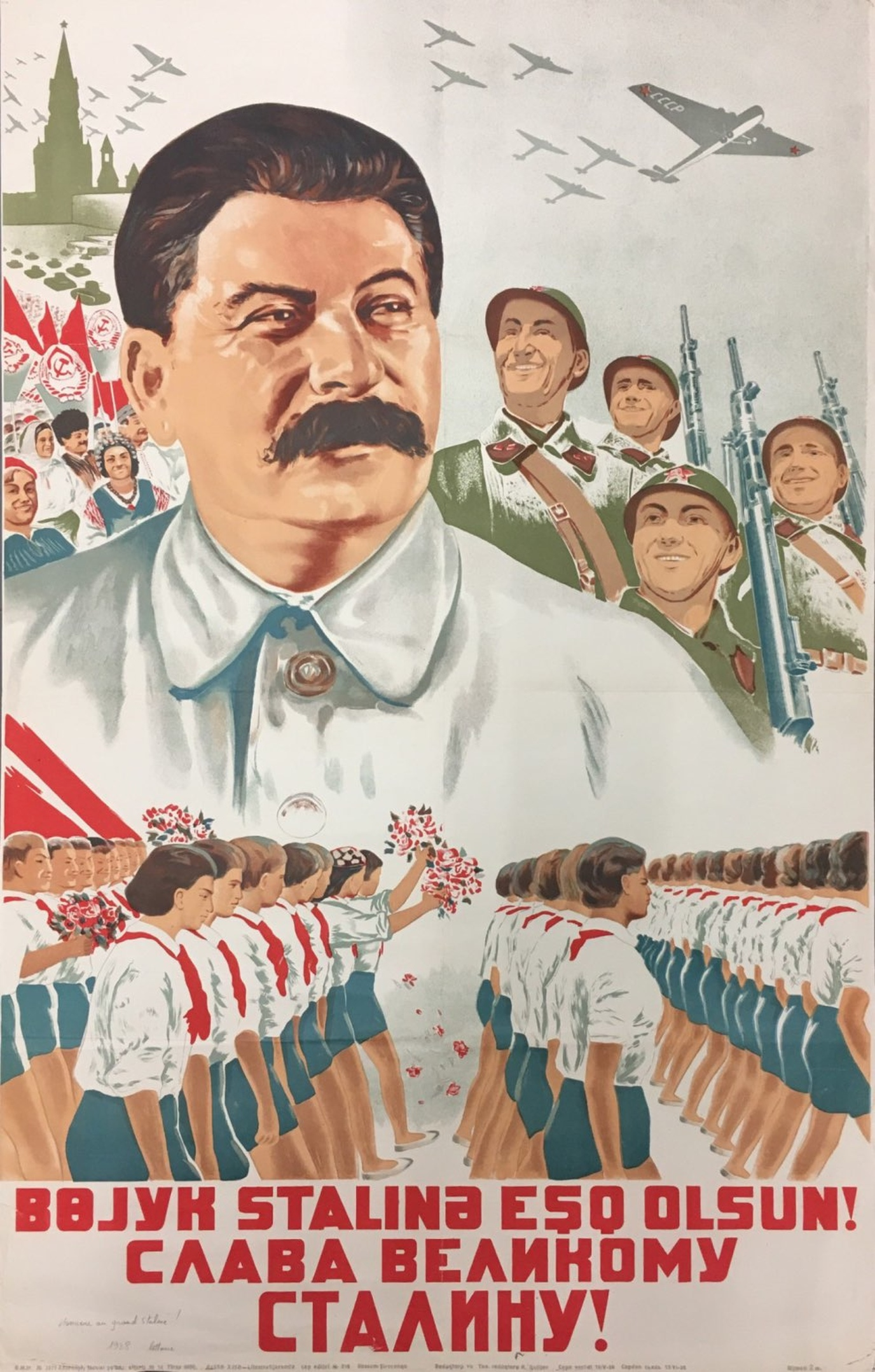
Soviet propaganda poster featuring Stalin, 1938 (Azerbaijani and Russian)

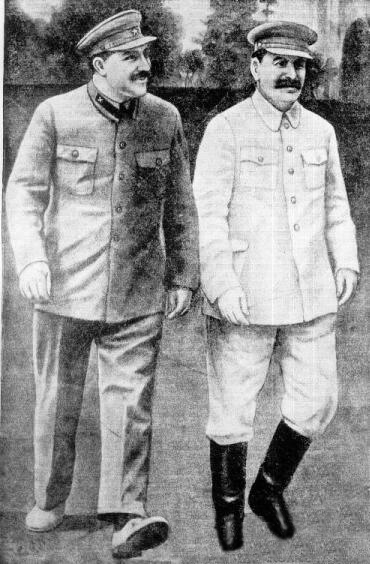
Stalin with Kaganovich in the 1930s

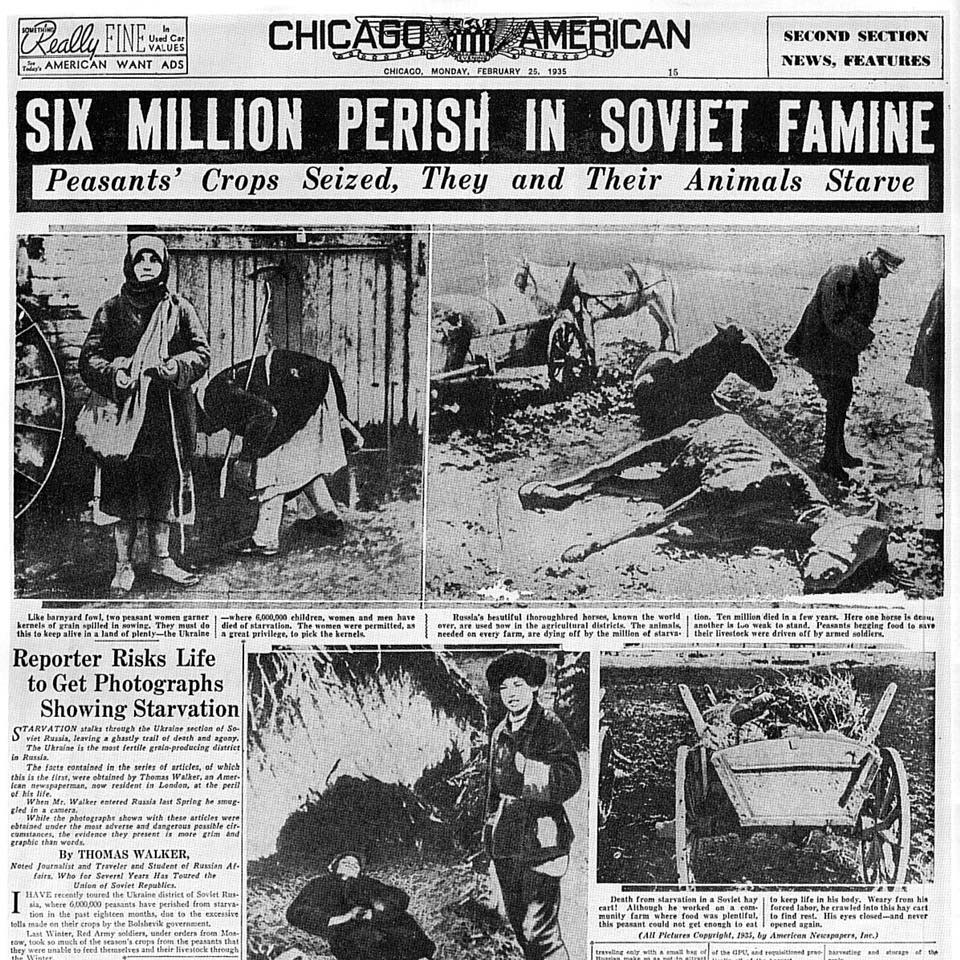
Newspaper reporting famine in Ukraine in 1935

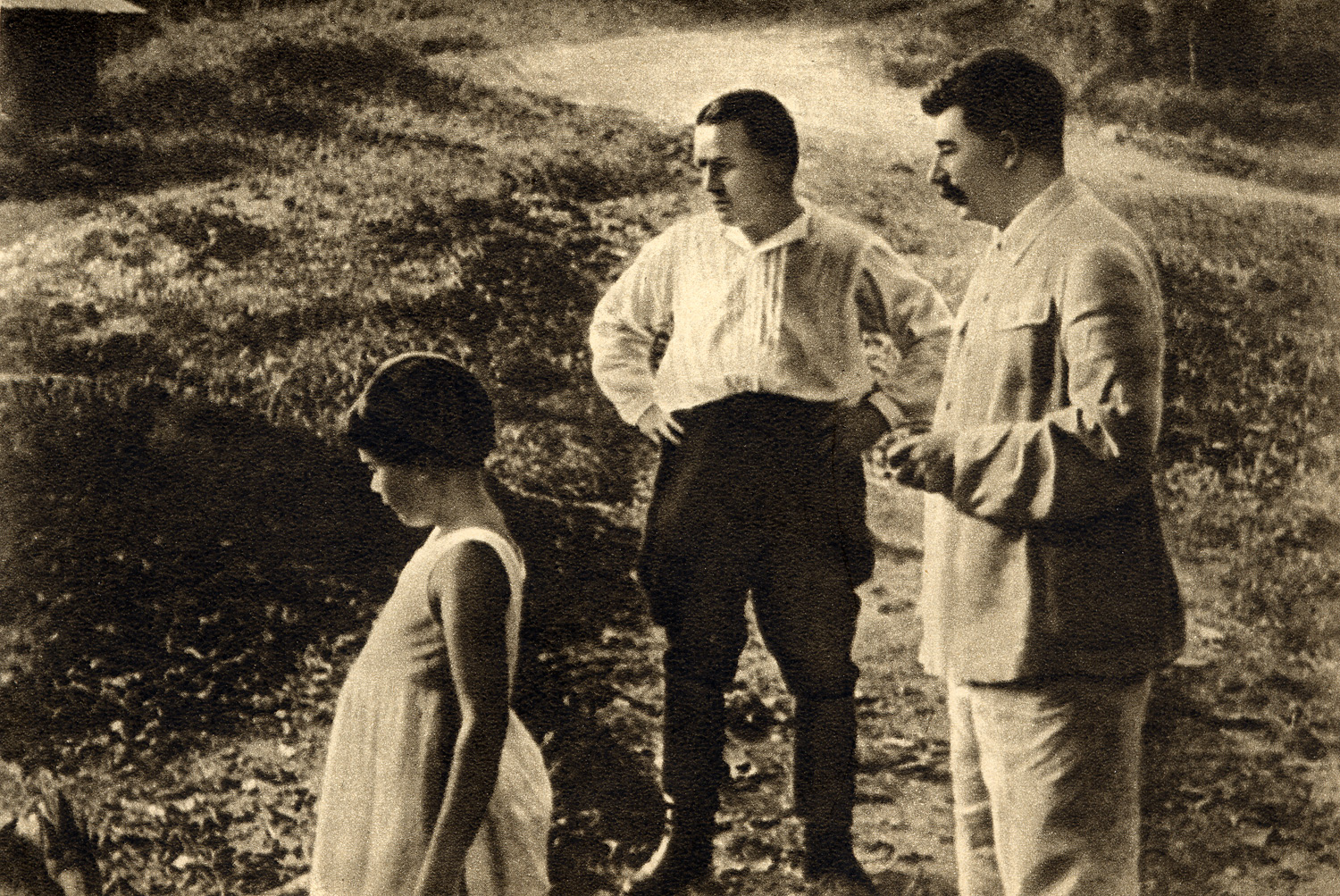
Stalin and his daughter with Kirov

Lawrence says, Mark Atwood Lawrence in his review of Stalin: Waiting for Hitler, 1929–1941 for The New York Times, quotes Winston Churchill's 1939 assessment about understanding Stalin's Soviet Union: "It is," Churchill said, "a riddle wrapped in a mystery inside an enigma". In defiance of Churchill's assessment, Stephen Kotkin's attempts to unravel and understand Stalin and his Soviet Union in the second of a three-volume biography of Stalin.

In the first volume of Kotkin's biography, he showed in detail how the world that Stalin was born into molded his personality and shaped his views as he developed into the person who would in turn mold the Bolshevik party and shape the Soviet government, both of which he would come to dominate. In this second volume, Kotkin begins to explore and understand the person who had come to dominate party and government and his evolution from dictator to despot, from a ruthless and brutal revolutionary into a mass murderer and architect of genocide. Mark Atwood Lawrence quotes directly from Kotkin, "The dictator believed, Kotkin contends, that the world’s most powerful countries "achieved and maintained their great-power status by mastery of a set of modern attributes: mass production, mass consumption, mass culture, mass politics."

== Scope ==
This volume spans the period from 1929, with the destruction of the Right Opposition and ends with the impending Nazi–Soviet war in 1941. Kotkin creates the biography around three sections, covering the three major events that unfolded for the Soviet Union during 1929–1941: the collectivization of agriculture in the early 1930s and the accompanying drive for mass rapid industrialization in the Soviet Union; the Great Terror of 1937–38; and finally the relationship between the Stalinist Soviet Union and Nazi Germany which begins with the Molotov–Ribbentrop Pact, which ultimately sets the stage for the events in the final part of the volume, the lead up to the German invasion of the Soviet Union.

== Paradoxes, biography, and history ==
In keeping with the viewpoint of the first volume, Waiting for Hitler is more than a biography of an individual, it is both a biography of an individual (primarily political, rather than personal) and the history of the time and place he impacted. "Kotkin does a fine job of placing Stalin’s actions in their geopolitical context, which encompassed the Spanish Civil War, Japanese aggression against China, the search for collective security in the 1930s, and much more. The dictator, he shows, was consumed by statecraft as well as by domestic politics. In this context, Kotkin argues persuasively that there was no contradiction between the Communist goal of world revolution and the dictator’s dedication to the revival of Russia’s great power status."

In keeping with the theme of the previous volume, Stalin as a paradox of power, Kotkin continues to explore the paradoxes that seem to define his subject. Writing in the London Review of Books, noted Soviet scholar Sheila Fitzpatrick writes, "Stalin is all paradox. He is pockmarked and physically unimpressive, yet charismatic; a gambler, but cautious; undeterred by the prospect of mass bloodshed, but with no interest in personal participation. Cynical about everyone else’s motives, he himself ‘lived and breathed ideals’. Suspicious of ‘fancy-pants intellectuals’, he was an omnivorous reader whose success in getting the Russian creative intelligentsia into line was ‘uncanny’. Inclined to paranoia, he was still able to keep it under control. Intensely suspicious of almost everyone, he was not suspicious enough about Hitler."

== Collectivization and famines ==
The author goes into significant detail about Stalin's ending the "concessions" Vladimir Lenin made to the Soviet peasantry and his ensuing genocidal campaign of collectivization, the destruction of class enemies or kulaks and the famine inducing grain seizures. The complicity of Stalin's inner circle and their intimate involvement in forming this policy and carrying out its implementation are made clear, as is their knowledge of its consequences in the countryside. The author clearly demonstrates the grain seizures as the primary cause of the man-made famine in Ukraine, the Lower Volga and Kazakhstan.

Sheila Fitzpatrick writes about one of Kotkin's controversial conclusions: that while Stalin's policy was the cause of the famines and he and his inner circle were completely aware of the resulting famines and did nothing to stop or mitigate them, Stalin was not deliberately trying to exterminate peasants. Fitzpatrick writes, "This is an unambiguous rejection of the view widely held by Ukrainians and reflected inter alia in Anne Applebaum’s recent account of famine in Ukraine. In Kotkin’s view, Stalin’s actions ‘do not indicate that he was trying to exterminate peasants or ethnic Ukrainians ... There was no “Ukrainian” famine; the famine was Soviet.’ Kazakhs in fact suffered proportionally much more than Ukrainians, with up to 1.4 million deaths out of a total population of 6.5 million, compared to Ukraine’s 3.5 million deaths out of 33 million. But Stalin wasn’t specifically trying to target Kazakhs either, even though in this region collectivisation was accompanied by a lethal policy of forced settlement of nomads. He was trying to get as much grain and other foodstuffs as he could out of peasants who didn’t want to give it up." (Note: See Kotkin, Waiting for Hitler, 1929-1941, pp.129.) (Note: Fitzpatrick is referring to Anne Applebaum's book, Red Famine: Stalin's War on Ukraine. Both Applebaum and Kotkin's books were published in October 2017.)

== Personal tragedy, purges and bloodshed ==
Connecting Stalin's personal experience to that of the Soviet Union, Ronald Grigor Suny writes "The Soviet Union was profoundly isolated, as was Stalin himself, particularly after the suicide of his wife in 1932 and the murder of his friend Sergei Kirov in 1934." Two of the more personal episodes Kotkin covers are the deaths of his wife Nadezhda Alliluyeva in 1932 and his best friend Sergei Kirov in 1934, both events which had a major psychological impact on Stalin. However, the author does not fail to connect these events to the larger political world of the Soviet Union and specifically the intraparty conflicts and the final purges of the Old Bolsheviks that would follow. Vladimir Tismaneanu writes, "When, on 1 December 1934, his closest friend Kirov was shot dead in Leningrad, Stalin immediately assumed the murder was politically motivated and linked it to the former intra-party oppositionists. ... For Kotkin, this is a key part of explaining Stalin's inner thoughts at the moment he decided to ignore Bukharin's desperate requests to spare him the death penalty. Liquidating Bukharin and Alexei Rykov (Lenin's successor as chairman of the Council of People's Commissars) completed the destruction of Lenin's party. ... The man whom Trotsky once foolishly (and inaccurately) named ‘the most blatant mediocrity on the Central Committee’ did annihilate all his rivals. At this point, the party and its history fully belonged to Stalin."

The Great Purges are covered in all their horror and the author provides a detailed account of how Stalin was responsible for their initiation and course and that his inner circle were accomplices, sometimes willing and sometimes due to self-preservation. Kotkin shows how Stalin used the ultimate loyalty test against his inner circle, their willingness to participate in the destruction of their own families, as a sign of loyalty to the despot above all others; those that passed might remain, those that didn't eventually share the fate of those they tried in vain to protect. Kotkin describes vividly the dystopian world created by the purges, the ever-present fear of arrest by the NKVD, the endless cycle of denunciations in a usually futile effort to save oneself, the bloody shadow of figures such as Genrikh Yagoda, Nikolai Yezhov, and Lavrentiy Beria.

One of the most debated issues surrounding the Great Terror is why Stalin decided to embark on a campaign that was so destructive to the party, government and military he had worked to build. Suny writes about Kotkin's answer, "he contends that the cause lies in a particular mentality that originated in Marxism and lethally meshed with Stalin's peculiar psychology. "The combination of Communist ways of thinking and political practice," he argues, "with Stalin's demonic mind and political skill allowed for astonishing bloodletting. Perceived security imperatives and a need for absolute unity once again turned the quest in Russia to build a strong state into personal rule. ... Tyranny has a circular logic: once a dictator has achieved supreme power, he becomes keener still to hold it, driving him to weed his own ranks of even potential challengers." As damaging as the purges were, Stalin was not irrational, Kotkin contends, but calculating and strategic."

Another common question asked by many about the Great Terror is how and why Stalin was able to conduct the purges and not face opposition or become a casualty in the process, Mark Atwood Lawrence states, "Kotkin’s most striking contribution, though, is to probe reasons Stalin encountered little opposition as he wrought mayhem on his nation. Careerism and bureaucratic incentives in the Soviet Union’s formidable apparatus of repression had something to do with it, Kotkin writes, but so too did the party’s monopoly on information and the public’s receptiveness to wild claims about the danger of subversion from within. Stalinism was, in this way, as much enabled from below as imposed from above."

== The wait is over as Adolf Hitler arrives ==
Addressing the veiled comparison between Hitler and Stalin, an unspoken theme that runs through the book until it bursts into the open at the third section of the book, Vladimir Tismaneanu writes, "This book is not only about Stalin and his rivals within the Bolshevik elite and neither is it limited to the impact of international crises on Stalin's choices. It is a comprehensive treatise on the explosive competition and inescapable battle between two ideology-driven dictators—Joseph Stalin and Adolf Hitler. They were immensely different beings, biographically and culturally, yet they shared an irreducible hostility to the bourgeois world." From a slightly different perspective, Sheila Fitzpatrick compares Kotkin's views of Stalin's geopolitical outlook with others. She writes, "In Kotkin's reading, Stalin is not 'the supreme realist – patient, shrewd and implacable' – described by Henry Kissinger, or even the 'rational and level-headed' statesman following traditional Russian imperatives portrayed by the Israeli historian Gabriel Gorodetsky. Kotkin's Stalin is shrewd and crafty, but sometimes too crafty for his own good. He makes mistakes and sometimes allows himself to be blinded by obsessions. ... Stalin misjudged Hitler too, assuming that he would never risk a two-front war, and also that he could be persuaded out of any invasion plans by the economic advantages of the 1939 pact. The pact, as Stalin (as channelled by Kotkin) saw it, was a 'miraculous' achievement that 'deflected the German war machine, delivered a bounty of German machine tools, enabled the reconquest and Sovietisation of tsarist borderlands, and reinserted the USSR into the role of arbitrating world affairs.'"

In perhaps the greatest paradox of Stalin's life, Ronald Grigor Suny writes about Stalin and Hitler, "A frenzy of hunting for spies and subversives shook the Soviet Union in the late 1930s, as Joseph Stalin propelled his police to unmask Trotskyite-fascists, rightist and leftist deviationists, wreckers, and hidden enemies with party cards. Yet if we apply the perverse logic of Stalinism, the greatest subversive agent to undermine the promise of the revolution of 1917 and transform the aspirations of millions into bloody despotism — objectively, as Stalinists would have said — was the dictator himself. Stalin killed more communists and did more to undermine the international communist movement than Adolf Hitler did. Rather than Lenin's comrades Lev Kamenev, Grigory Zinoviev, Nikolai Bukharin and Lev Trotsky allying with Hitler, as they were falsely accused of doing in the great show trials of 1936-1938, it was Stalin who in 1939, as Trotsky explained, advanced "his candidacy for the role . . . of Hitler's main agent."

== Reception ==
=== Journal reviews ===
Waiting for Hitler was widely reviewed in notable academic journals. Some of the journals reviews of the book were:

- Carley, M. J. (2018). Stalin. Vol. II: Waiting for Hitler 1928–1941. Europe-Asia Studies, 70(3), pp. 477–479.
- Johnson, R. E. (2019). Stalin: Waiting for Hitler, 1929–1941 by Stephen Kotkin. International Journal, 74(3), pp. 490–492.
- Lenoe, M. (2019). Stalin: Waiting for Hitler, 1929–1941. The American Historical Review, 1241 pp. 376–377.
- Morson, G. S. (2017). Stalin’s Ism: A review of Stalin: Waiting for Hitler, 1929-1941 by Stephen Kotkin. The New Criterion, 36(3), pp. 11–15.
- Tismaneanu, V. (2018). Stalin, Vol. II: Waiting for Hitler, 1928–1941. International Affairs, 94(4), pp. 926–928.

=== Popular media ===
Waiting for Hitler received reviews in the mainstream media, including many reviews by notable scholars in Soviet history and Stalinism. Some of these reviews include:

- Sheila Fitzpatrick (April 5, 2018). "Just like that: Second-Guessing Stalin". London Review of Books. Vol. 40, no. 7.
- Mark Atwood Lawrence (October 19, 2017). "A Portrait of Stalin in All His Murderous Contradictions". The New York Times.
- Joshua Rubenstein (October 31, 2017). "Review: The Turn to Tyranny". The Wall Street Journal.
- Ronald Grigor Suny (November 22, 2017). "Terror and killing and more killing under Stalin leading up to World War II". The Washington Post.

== See also ==
- Bibliography of Stalinism and the Soviet Union
- Case of the Anti-Soviet "Bloc of Rightists and Trotskyites"
- Case of Trotskyist Anti-Soviet Military Organization
- Great Break (USSR)
- Gulag
- Joint State Political Directorate
- Mass graves in the Soviet Union
- Mass operations of the NKVD
- Moscow Trials
- NKVD troika
- Population transfer in the Soviet Union
- Rise of Joseph Stalin
- Stalin: Breaker of Nations
- Soviet invasion of Poland
- Soviet Union in World War II
- Stalinism
- Stalin's cult of personality
- History of the Soviet Union (1927–1953)
