= Industrial Academy (Moscow) =

Educational institution

Coordinates: 55.76861°N 37.6625°E

The Industrial Academy (Russian: Промакадемия) was an educational institution operating in Moscow from 1925 to 1941; it also had branches in Leningrad (from 1929) and Sverdlovsk (from 1931).

The Industrial Academy was intended as the next step after attending a Rabfak and was intended to "provide its students with a grounding in general economic management, as well as a technical specialization" - "a school for managers and directors." The first students graduated in 1930. Many of the Soviet nomenklatura of the Stalin era graduated from the Academy in the 1930s. Although it was officially considered an institution of higher education, the Industrial Academy actually provided a secondary school education, as well as technical knowledge required for work in industry. Over the years, the Industrial Academy was given the names of Lazar Kaganovich, Vyacheslav Molotov, and finally Joseph Stalin. In July 1941, by a decision of the State Defense Committee, the Academy of Industry was disbanded.

== Notable teachers ==
- Yakov Chernikhov

== Notable alumni ==
- Nadezhda Alliluyeva
- Semyon Ignatyev
- Alexey Stakhanov
- Nikita Khrushchev attended but did not graduate. He later became the party secretary of the academy before becoming the Party leader for the Bauman district, site of the Academy.

== See also ==
- Education in Russia
- Rabfak
