= Soyoung Lee =

American curator

- Born: Jakarta, Indonesia
- Occupations: Art historian Curator
- Spouse: Stephen Kotkin
- Children: 2

Academic background
- Education: Columbia University (BA, MA, PhD)
- Thesis: Interregional Reception and Invention in Korean and Japanese Ceramics, 1400-1800 (2014)
- Doctoral advisor: Matthew McKelway

Academic work
- Discipline: Art history
- Sub-discipline: Korean art
- Institutions: Metropolitan Museum of Art; Harvard Art Museums

Soyoung Lee is an art historian and curator. She is the Barbara Bass Director and CEO of the Asian Art Museum of San Francisco.

== Biography ==
Lee was born in Jakarta, where her father was a Korean diplomat tasked with promoting Korean art and culture, and has lived in Stockholm, London, Los Angeles, Seoul, and Tokyo. She received her B.A., M.A., and Ph.D., all from Columbia University. Her doctoral thesis examined the influence of 15th-16th century Korean ceramics on the ceramic industries in Kyushu, Japan.

Lee joined the Metropolitan Museum of Art in 2003 and was assistant curator, associate curator, and curator in the museum's Asian Art Department. At the time of her hiring, she was the Met's first curator of Korean art. Her research has focused on cross-cultural exchanges in East Asian Art. At the Met, she has curated the exhibitions such as Art of the Korean Renaissance, 1400–1600 (2009); Poetry in Clay: Korean Buncheong Ceramics from the Leeum, Samsung Museum of Art (2011); Silla: Korea’s Golden Kingdom (2014); and Diamond Mountains: Travel and Nostalgia in Korean Art (2018).

Lee served as the Met's Forum of Curators, Conservators, and Scientists in 2016–17 and a trustee of the Association of Art Museum Curators.

In 2018, Lee was hired by Harvard Art Museums to serve as the Landon and Lavinia Clay Chief Curator of the Harvard Art Museums. While at Harvard, she co-curated exhibitions such as Future Minded: New Works in the Collection (2024) and Earthly Delights: 6,000 Years of Asian Ceramics (2022) while leading the institution's collections-building and its training program for aspiring museum professionals.

In January 2025, the Asian Art Museum of San Francisco named Lee as its new Barbara Bass Director and CEO. She is the second Asian American woman to serve as the head of the museum.

She is married to historian Stephen Kotkin.
