= Polina Zhemchuzhina =

Soviet politician (1897–1970)

- Полина Жемчужина
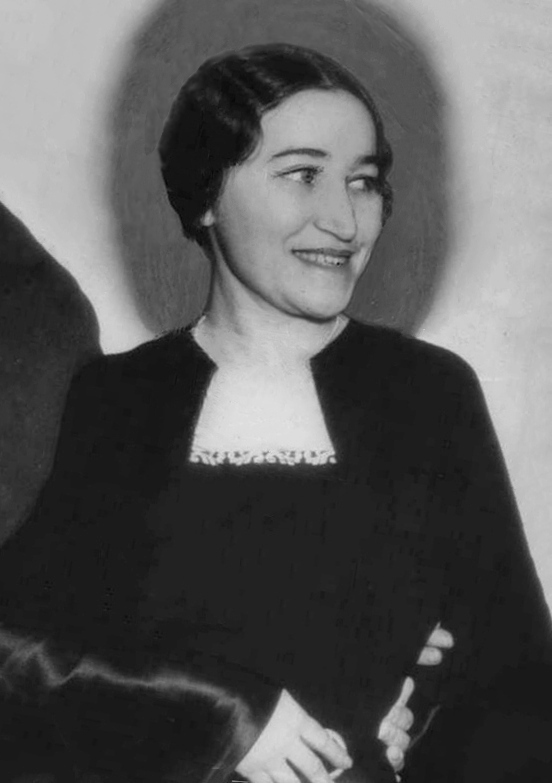
- Zhemchuzhina in 1936

People's Commissar for Fisheries
- In office 19 January 1939 – 21 November 1939
- Preceded by: Office established
- Succeeded by: Alexander Ishkov

Personal details
- Born: Perl Solomonovna Karpovskaya; 27 February 1897 Polohy, Yekaterinoslav Governorate, Russian Empire
- Died: 1 April 1970 (aged 73) Moscow, Russian SFSR, Soviet Union
- Citizenship: Soviet Union
- Party: Russian Communist Party (1918–1948)
- Spouse: Vyacheslav Molotov (m. 1920)
- Children: 2
- Relatives: Vyacheslav Nikonov (grandson)

Polina Semyonovna Zhemchuzhina (Note: Russian: Полина Семёновна Жемчужина, IPA: [pɐˈlʲinə sʲɪˈmʲɵnəvnə ʐɨmˈtɕuʐɨnə].) (born Perl Solomonovna Karpovskaya; (Note: Russian: Перл Соломоновна Карповская.) 27 February 1897 – 1 April 1970) was a Soviet politician and the wife of the Soviet foreign minister Vyacheslav Molotov. Zhemchuzhina was the director of the Soviet national cosmetics trust from 1932 to 1936, Minister of Fisheries in 1939, and head of textiles production in the Ministry of Light Industry from 1939 to 1948. In 1948, Zhemchuzhina was arrested by the Soviet secret police, charged with treason, and sent into internal exile, where she remained until after the death of Joseph Stalin in 1953.

== Biography ==
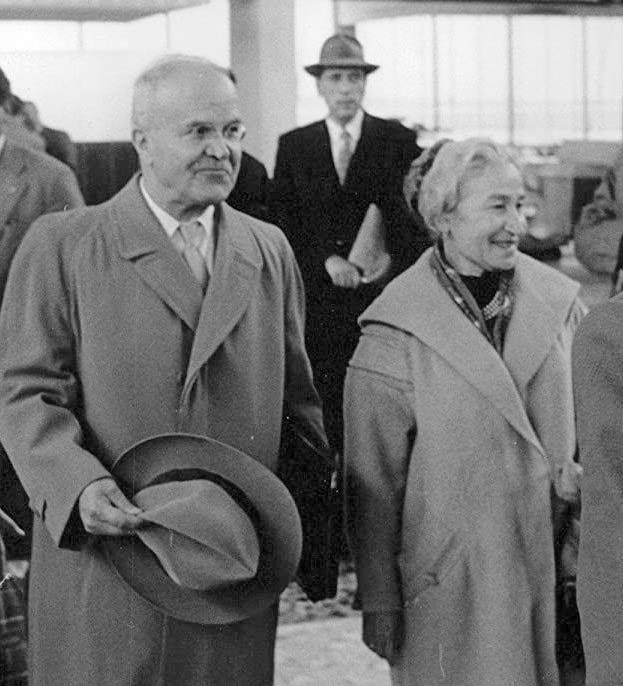
Molotov and Zhemchuzhina in 1960

Zhemchuzhina was born Perl Solomonovna Karpovskaya to the family of a Jewish tailor Solomon Karpovsky in the village of Polohy, in the Alexandrovsky Uyezd (today Zaporizhzhia Oblast, Ukraine). She joined the Russian Social Democratic Labour Party of Bolsheviks in 1918 and served as a propaganda commissar in the Red Army during the Russian Civil War. As a communist, she went by the surname Zhemchuzhina, which, like her Yiddish birth name, Perl, means "pearl" in Russian.

In 1920, she married Vyacheslav Molotov, by then a member of the Central Committee of the Communist Party of the Soviet Union (CPSU). She also made a successful career in the Soviet hierarchy, serving in the Narkomat of Food Industry under Anastas Mikoyan, to become in 1939 the first female Minister (Narkom) in the government of the Soviet Union, as head of the Ministry of the Fishing Industry, and was elected to the Central Committee that year.

During the 1920s, her sister immigrated to Palestine. Her brother Sam Carp was a successful businessman in the United States. The Molotovs had two daughters: Sonia, adopted in 1929, and Svetlana, born in 1930.

According to historian Zhores Medvedev, Stalin was highly suspicious of Zhemchuzhina. He thought that she negatively influenced Molotov, and he recommended Molotov divorce her. The Molotovs shared an apartment with the Stalins. Zhemchuzhina and Stalin's wife Nadezhda Alliluyeva became close friends. In November 1932, Zhemchuzhina followed Alliluyeva out of a dining room after Stalin had publicly chastised his wife in the company of friends. The next morning Alliluyeva was found dead by suicide, having shot herself with a small Walther PP pistol. This event is believed to have fueled a secret hatred of Zhemchuzhina by Stalin.

In a secret meeting of the Politburo on 10 August 1939, the agenda item number 33, "Regarding Comrade Zhemchuzhina" and her alleged "connections to spies", led to a request to verify that information by the NKVD. As it was customary during the Great Purges, many of her coworkers were arrested and questioned, but the "evidence" (frequently acquired by force) against her was so contradictory that on 24 October, the Politburo concluded the "allegations against comrade Zhemchuzhina's participation in sabotage and spying... to be considered slanderous." However, she was severely reprimanded and demoted for unknowingly keeping contacts with "enemy elements thereby facilitating their spying missions." In February 1941, she was taken off the list of the candidates to the Central Committee.

On the Eastern Front, Zhemchuzhina actively supported the Jewish Anti-Fascist Committee (JAC) and befriended many of its leading members, most notably Solomon Mikhoels. She frequently attended performances by the Moscow State Jewish Theatre.

Polina Zhemchuzhina befriended Golda Meir, who arrived in Moscow in November 1948 as the first Israeli envoy to the USSR. Fluent in Yiddish, Zhemchuzhina acted as a translator for a diplomatic meeting between Meir and her husband, the Soviet foreign minister. However, this claim (of being an interpreter) is not supported by Golda Meir's memoir "My Life". Presentation of her Ambassadorial credentials were done in Hebrew not in Yiddish. According to Golda Meir's own account of the reception given by Mr. Molotov on November 7, Mrs. Zhemchuzhina has spent significant time during this reception not only talking to Golda Meir herself but also in conversation with Mrs. Meir's daughter Sarah and her friend Yael Namir about their life as kibbutzniks. They have discussed the complete collectivization of property and related issues. At the end Mrs. Zhemchuzhina gave Golda Meir's daughter Sarah a hug and said: "Be well. If everything goes well with you, it will go well for all Jews everywhere."

She was arrested for treason in December 1948, consequently being forced into an unwanted divorce from Μolotov. She was convicted and sentenced to five years in a labor camp. After the death of Stalin in March 1953, she was released from captivity by Lavrentiy Beria and reunited with her husband. Her first question upon her release was "How's Stalin?" Upon being told he had died only days before, she fainted.

According to Svetlana Alliluyeva, Stalin's daughter, Molotov then became subservient to his wife, yielding to her in the same way he had previously yielded to Stalin. According to Roy Medvedev, Svetlana Alliluyeva recalled Polina telling her, "Your father was a genius. He liquidated the fifth column in our country, and when the war broke out the Party and the people were one. There's no revolutionary spirit around nowadays, just opportunism everywhere. Look at what the Italian Communists are up to! It's shameful! The war scared everyone. China's our only hope. Only they have kept alive the revolutionary spirit." This conversation occurred at the height of the Cultural Revolution in China. She died of natural causes in 1970.

== In fiction ==
Zhemchuzhina is portrayed by English actress Diana Quick in the 2017 film The Death of Stalin.

== Cited sources ==
- Sebag-Montefiore, Simon (2005). Stalin: The Court of the Red Tsar. Vintage Books. ISBN 978-1-4000-7678-9.
- Vasilyeva, Larisa Nikolaevna (1994). Kremlin wives. Arcade Publishing. ISBN 9781559702607.
