= Jerusalem: The Biography =

Book by Simon Sebag Montefiore

- First edition
- Author: Simon Sebag Montefiore
- Language: English
- Subject: History of Jerusalem
- Publisher: Weidenfeld & Nicolson
- Publication date: 27 January 2011
- Publication place: United Kingdom
- Media type: Hardcover, Paperback, audiobook, E-Book at Google Books
- ISBN: 0-2978-52655
- Dewey Decimal: 956.94/420099
- LC Class: 2011-020827
- Preceded by: Young Stalin (LA Times Book Prize, Costa Book Awards)

Jerusalem: The Biography is a 2011 bestselling non-fiction book by British popular historian and writer Simon Sebag Montefiore.

== Synopsis ==
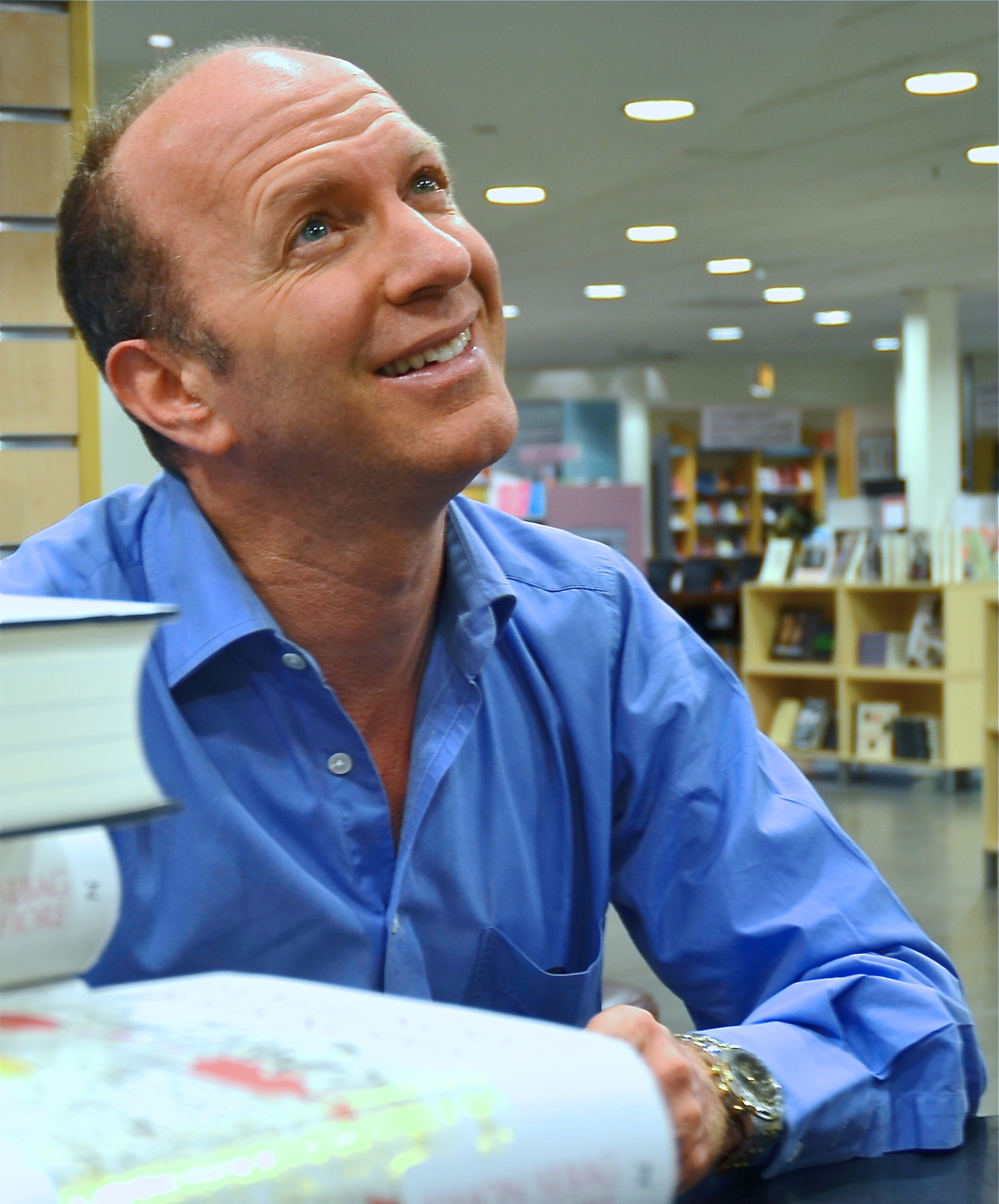
Author Montefiore's presentation of his book in Stockholm, 21 September 2011

Montefiore chose to organize Jerusalem chronologically, stretching it from King David's establishment of the city as his capital (the Proto-Canaanite and Canaanite-Egyptian periods are briefly mentioned) to the 1967 Six-Day War, with an epilogue pondering on more recent events. In the introduction, the author explains that "it is only by chronological narrative that one avoids the temptation to see the past through the obsessions of the present."

The author narrates the history of Jerusalem as the centre of world history, but does not intend the book as an encyclopaedia of every aspect of this ancient city, nor as a guidebook of every niche, capital and archway in every building. At the beginning of his book, Montefiore clearly explains that neither does he intend to provide a history of Judaism, Christianity or Islam, nor a study of the nature of God in Jerusalem: for these he remands elsewhere, to a plethora of other publications. His task, Montefiore affirms, is to pursue the facts, not to adjudicate between the mysteries of different religions or the secular reasons behind historical events: Jerusalem is a synthesis based on a wide reading of the primary sources, ancient and modern, on personal seminars with specialists, professors, archaeologists, families and statesmen, and on the author's multiple visits to Jerusalem, the shrines and archaeological digs.

In December 2011, Simon Sebag Montefiore presented on BBC Four a three-part history of Jerusalem, based on his book and by the title Jerusalem: The Making of a Holy City.

== Awards ==
- 2011: National Jewish Book Award for Jewish Book of the Year

== See also ==
- Walls of Jerusalem
- Jerusalem Day (Yom Yerushalayim)
- List of places in Jerusalem
