= Stalin: Paradoxes of Power, 1878–1928 =

2014 biography of Joseph Stalin by Stephen Kotkin

Stalin: Paradoxes of Power
- First edition book cover
- Author: Stephen Kotkin
- Language: English
- Subject: Joseph Stalin, Russian Revolution, History of the Russian Revolution, History of the Soviet Union, Stalinism.
- Genre: History, biography
- Published: 2014
- Publisher: Penguin Random House (print and digital), Recorded Books (audiobook)
- Publication place: United States
- Media type: Print, digital, audiobook
- Pages: 976
- Followed by: Stalin: Waiting for Hitler, 1929-1941
- Website: Penguin Random House

Stalin: Paradoxes of Power, 1878–1928 is the first volume in the three-volume biography of Joseph Stalin by American historian and Princeton Professor of History Stephen Kotkin. It was originally published in November 2014 by Penguin Random House and as an audiobook in December 2014 by Recorded Books. (Note: Book was reprinted as a paperback by Penguin in October 2015 (ISBN 978-0143127864).) The second volume, Stalin: Waiting for Hitler, 1929–1941, was published in 2017 by Penguin Random House.

== Synopsis ==
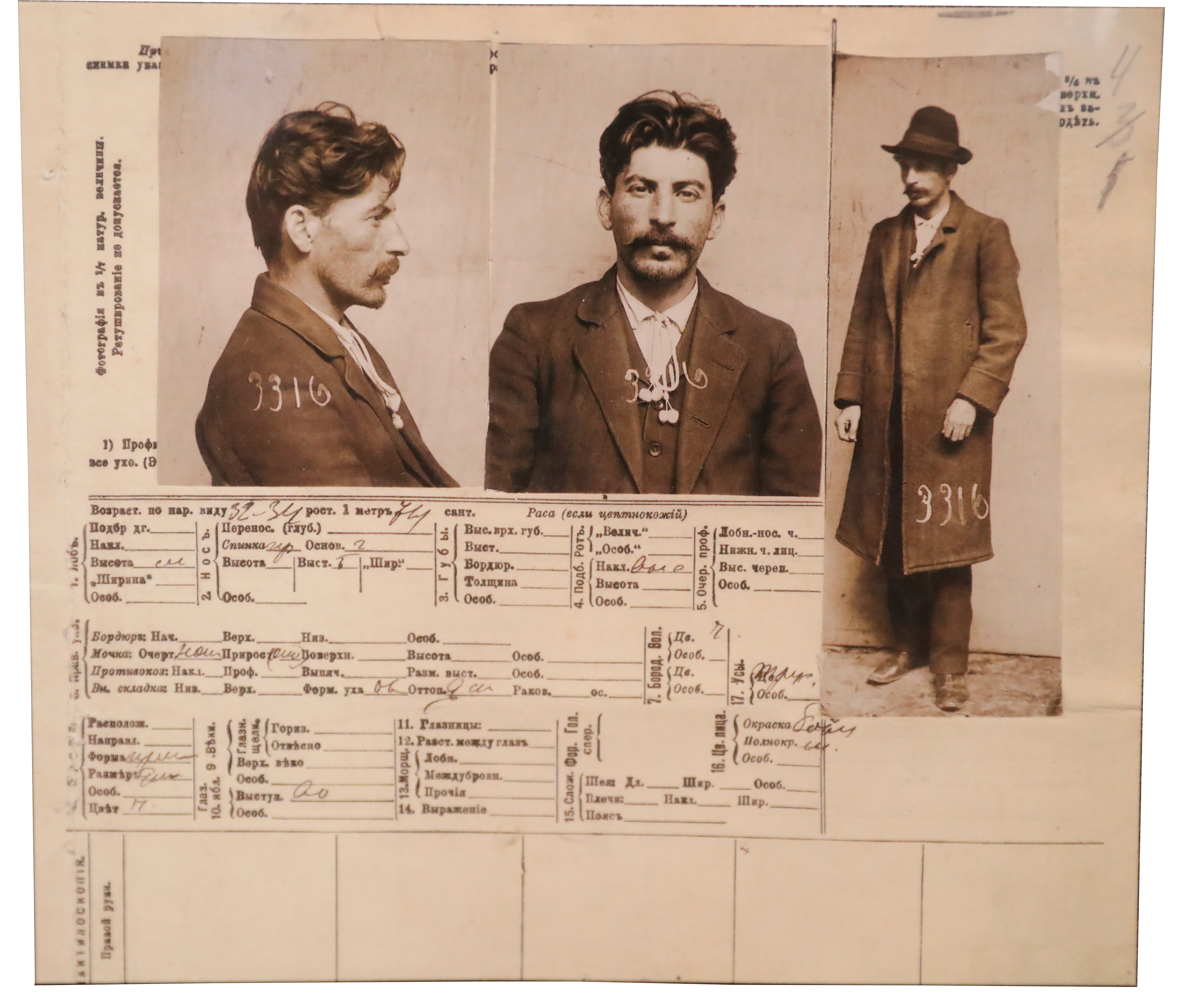
Police mugshots of Stalin, c. 1911

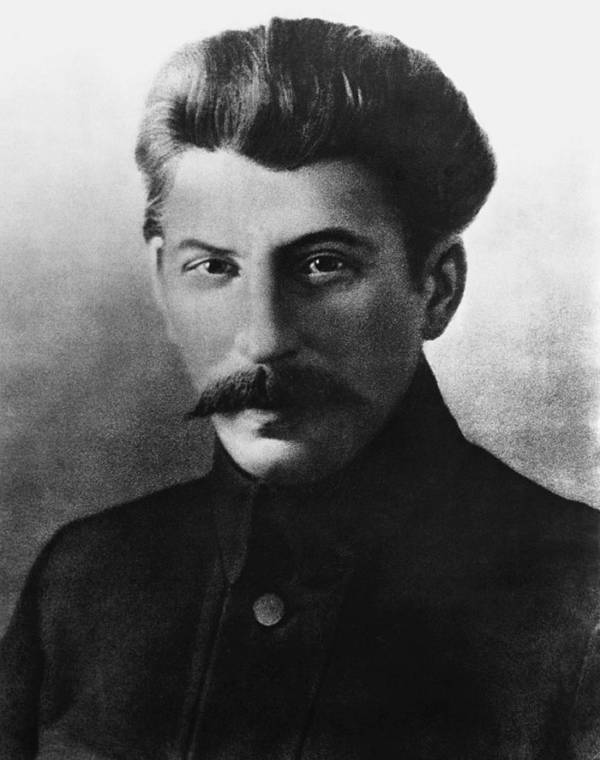
Stalin 1917

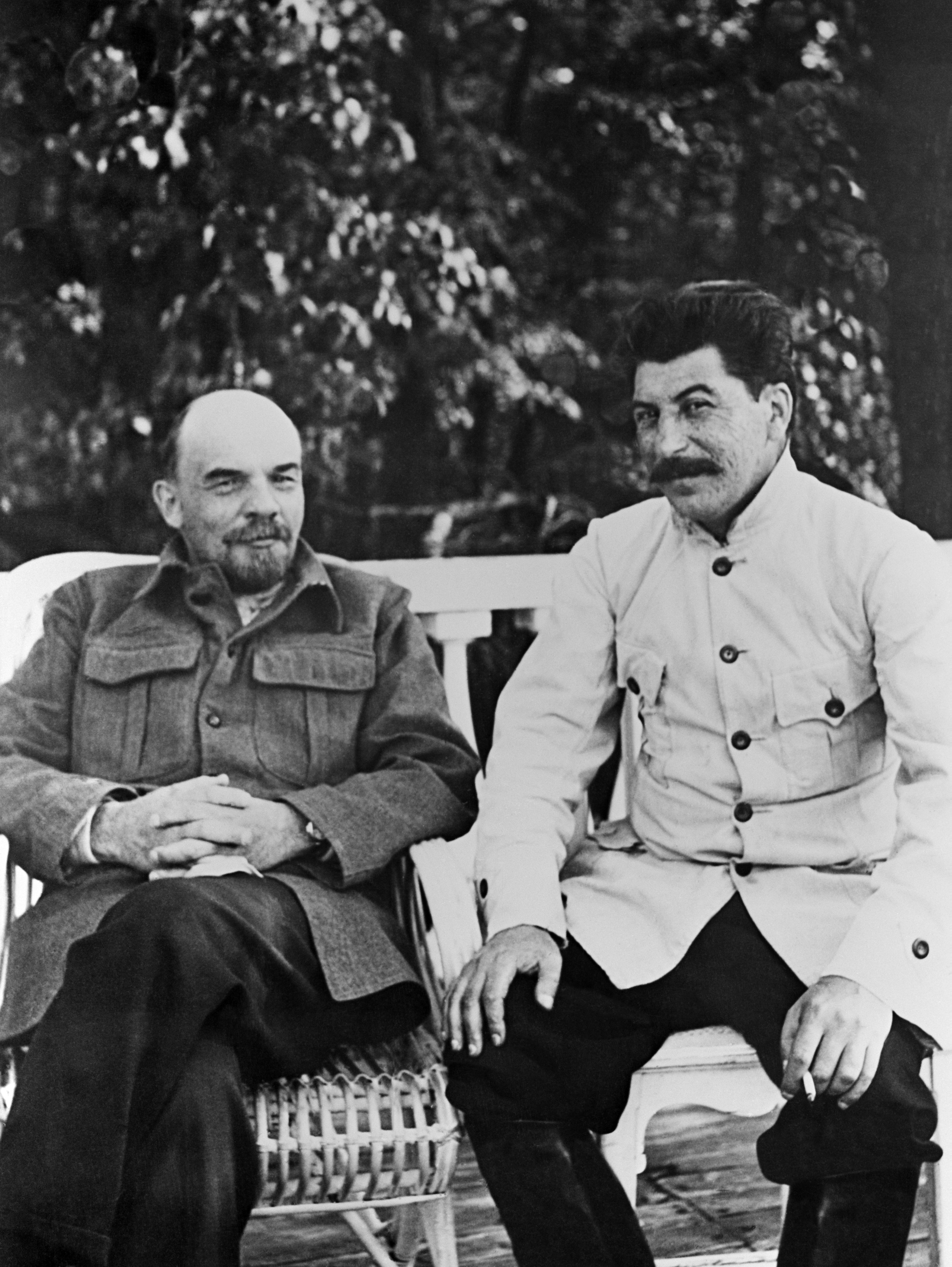
Lenin and Stalin

This first volume details Stalin's life from his birth through his rise to power within the Bolshevik party in 1928.

Paradoxes of Power can be viewed as having two halves: the first half where the world Stalin developed in is explored, the state of Russian society, the Russo-Japanese War, World War I, and other forces changing Russia. In this section, Stalin as an individual plays only a minor role compared to the world around him. The second half of the book shifts to focus on the revolutionary movement, the revolution itself, and the development of Bolshevik power and Stalin's place in it. In this half Stalin emerges from the background and his role in the revolution and his rise to power with the paradoxes that accompanied it are the focus.

The book's appendix contains categorized bibliography.

== Biography and history ==
The work is both a political biography recounting his life in the context of his involvement in Russian and later Soviet history, and to a lesser degree a personal biography, detailing Stalin's private life and connecting it to his public life as revolutionary, leader and dictator. The Independent writes in their review, Kotkin's biography "tends to history rather than biography" and Hiroaki Kuromiya writes, "the book is more a “marriage of biography and history".

Paradoxes of Power stands out as part biography and part history, and finds a unique place among the many biographies of Stalin. In a review of Paradoxes of Power, The Guardian states "It feels not so much like a biography of the man as a biography of the world in his lifetime." Ronald Grigor Suny writes that Kotkin "details better than any previous account the viciousness that brought down Stalin's opponents, one after the other, with these personal conflicts obscuring the original aims of the revolution." Writing in the Historian, Martin H. Folly writes "His main concern is political rather than biographical, and from the start he looks to set Stalin in a broad context of the crisis of Russia from tsarism to provisional government to Lenin’s Soviet Union."

== The world in which Stalin developed ==
In the first part of the volume, Kotkin explores the world that Ioseb Jugashvili developed in and details how this world was the primary force that transformed him into the person of Joseph Stalin. The author takes time to detail the various circumstances in Russia that impacted Stalin's development, such as the impact of the 1905-06 revolution, the unfolding disaster Russia faced in World War I, and the poverty and hopelessness of the average Russian worker, soldier, and sailor. In the Slavic Review, Lewis H. Siegelbaum comments, "Kotkin insists on presenting a panoply of structural forces and contingencies. Among the former is the Russian autocratic system and its fitful modernizations; the "European castle-in-the air project of socialism" and its bastardized Bolshevik version; global geopolitics; world war and the destruction of belligerent empires.".

Writing about Kotkin's approach to writing his biography, Vladislav Zubok states, "The book deals with big concepts: Soviet Eurasia, revolution, mass politics, ideology, modernization, and geopolitics. Yet in the end, the biographer places an individual squarely in the centre of history. Dzhugashvili-Stalin himself is the key answer to ‘paradoxes of power’. While structural causes and challenges explain much of Russian history, only individual decisions and contingencies determined the course of events."

Many commentators have noted that the person of Stalin is present only as a supporting player in the first half of the book. Stalin's personal life, family, and education receive only the minimal attention needed to place him in the world Kotkin describes.

== Stalin and the world he helped shape ==
Transitioning into the second half of the work, which is more biographical, but still fundamentally more history than biography, Kotkin provides the reader with a view of how Stalin both worked within and transformed the Bolshevik party after the October Revolution and mastered the regime’s ever evolving power structures. In a major contrast with the first half of the book, Kotkin here shows how Stalin was not molded by the circumstances he found himself in, but rather molded those circumstances and shaped the events unfolding around him to facilitate his rise to power. He shows Stalin to be a true student of Lenin method of leadership: an uncompromising class warrior with a complete lack of willingness to compromise with resolute ideological conviction.

Hiroaki Kuromiya writes, "Without Stalin, the Soviet Union would have been utterly different. No other person would have done what Stalin did, particularly the brutal and headlong campaign for the wholesale collectivization of agriculture." In writing about how Stalin's development and the development of the early Soviet Union were inextricably linked, Gary Saul Morson writes, "How was all this carnage possible? How did a revolution made in the name of social justice, and supported by so many progressive spirits around the world, lead to such monstrous results? What made Stalin capable of such cruelty, and how did he manage to accumulate the power to practice it?"

In contrast to most other biographies of Stalin, which portray Stalin in the early years of the revolution as a minor figure of little importance, Kotkin details how Stalin in these years was an ambitious organizer, intriguer and political infighter, and this experience ultimately prepared him to win the Bolshevik power struggle after Lenin's death. Noted scholar of Soviet history Ronald Grigor Suny states, "Reversing Trotsky’s famous conclusion that 'Stalin did not create the apparatus. The apparatus created him,' Kotkin shows convincingly that 'Stalin created the apparatus, and it was a colossal feat.' His “power flowed from attention to detail but also to people— and not just any people, but often to the new people." Later, Suny states "The Stalin that Kotkin presents was a strategic thinker, both realistic to the point of cynicism and ideological to a fault", highlighting one more of the many paradoxes of power Kotkin explores.

Hiroaki Kuromiya in his review in the Journal of Cold War Studies that, "this is an enormously rich book that, if read carefully, will greatly benefit anyone interested in Russia and the Soviet Union."

== Theme ==
The central theme of the first volume of Kotkin's biography is Stalin as an individual of paradoxes and how those paradoxes affected his rise to power. David Brandenberger writes, "According to Kotkin, Stalin was the paradoxical embodiment of the Bolshevik Revolution: an upstart driven by a fusion of Leninist vanguardism, political realism, and bureaucratic savvy. Kotkin’s Stalin was supremely capable, while at the same time firmly rooted in the Bolshevik ideological experience, a depiction that avoids the mistake made by many of the general secretary’s would-be biographers who portray him as standing somehow outside of his historical place and time."

== Criticism ==
In his review, Ronald Grigor Suny writes about some of the more frequent criticisms of Kotkin's biography. Among his conclusions about Kotkin's biography are "he fails at times to link Lenin's and Stalin's emotional makeups and intellectual passions to the choices they made in the swirl of great historical forces. [...] He deprives the reader of insight into how Stalin's early experience as a writer and an outlaw influenced his later life." Regarding Stalin's role as a Marxist and communist thinker and ideologue, he states, "the debates within the party are reduced to personality disputes, and the author treats Stalin's philosophical universe with hostile condescension." He critiques Kotkin's analysis of the controversy surrounding Lenin's testament, he states, "Kotkin's interpretation, fascinating as it is, relies on conjecture rather than evidence." Finally Suny states, "Kotkin radically simplifies 'socialism' to mean anti-capitalism as practiced in Stalin's Soviet Union. In Kotkin's view, Marxist–Leninist ideology was the straitjacket chosen by the communists to destroy a society and build a new order."

In his review in The Independent, Edward Wilson offers this final assessment, "This otherwise excellent book is marred by its conclusion. In a final coda, 'If Stalin had died', Kotkin plays 'what-if-history' – a dangerous game for any historian. He suggests that the horrors of Stalin's forced collectivisation of agriculture could have been alleviated by 'market systems' which are 'fully compatible with fast-paced industrialisation.'"

A controversial element of his work has been the assertion that Lenin's Testament was a forgery and written by his wife, Krupskaya. This has attracted criticism from several, prominent historians. Suny wrote that Kotkin's hypothesis lacked mainstream support in a review:

"Few other scholars doubt the authorship of the document, which accurately reflected Lenin’s views, nor was it questioned at the time it was written and debated in high party circles. Kotkin’s interpretation, fascinating as it is, relies on conjecture rather than evidence".

Historian Mark Edele was critical of this hypothesis and argued that Kotkin "went as far as embracing the empirically shaky thesis that Lenin’s 'Testament' was a forgery. As one of his critics pointed out, this discredited position is otherwise embraced only by Russian neo-Stalinists".

== Reception ==
=== Journal reviews ===
Paradoxes of Power was widely reviewed in notable academic journals. Some of the journals reviews of the book were:

- Andreyev, C. (2016). Stalin. Vol. 1: Paradoxes of Power, 1878–1928, by Stephen Kotkin.The English Historical Review, 131(551), pp. 949–951.
- Brandenberger, D. (2016). Book Review: Stalin, Volume I: Paradoxes of Power, 1878–1928 Stephen Kotkin. The American Historical Review, 121(1), pp. 333–334.
- Folly, M. H. (2016) Stalin: Volume 1, Paradoxes of Power, 1878–1928. By Stephen Kotkin. The Historian, 78:4, pp. 813–815
- Kuromiya, H. (2015). Book Review: Stalin, Vol. 1: Paradoxes of Power, 1878–1928 by Stephen Kotkin. Journal of Cold War Studies, 17(3), pp. 245–247.
- Siegelbaum, L. (2015). Review: Stalin. Volume 1, Paradoxes of Power, 1878–1928 by Stephen Kotkin. Slavic Review, 74(3), pp. 604–606.
- Thatcher, I. D. (2016). Stephen Kotkin, Stalin: Vol. 1: Paradoxes of Power, 1878–1928. European History Quarterly, 46(1), pp. 151–154.
- Zubok, V. (2016). Book Review: Stalin, Vol. I: Paradoxes of Power, 1878–1928. Cold War History, 16(2), pp. 231–233.

=== Popular media ===
Paradoxes of Power received reviews in the mainstream media, including many reviews by notable scholars in Soviet history and Stalinism. Some of these reviews include:

- Ronald Grigor Suny (December 19, 2014). "Book review: 'Stalin: Volume 1, Paradoxes of Power, 1878-1928,' by Stephen Kotkin". The Washington Post.
- Serge Schmemann (January 9, 2015). "'Stalin: Paradoxes of Power' by Stephen Kotkin". The New York Times.
- Joshua Rubenstein (November 21, 2014). "Book Review: 'Stalin' by Stephen Kotkin". The Wall Street Journal.
- Ian Ona Johnson (2018). "Blood-Soaked Monster - Stalin Vol. 1 by Stephen Kotkin". Claremont Review of Books. 18 (4).
- Richard Pipes (November 20, 2014). "The Cleverness of Joseph Stalin". The New York Review of Books.
- Anne Applebaum (November 1, 2014). "Understanding Stalin". The Atlantic.
- Keith Gessen (October 20, 2017). "How Stalin Became Stalinist". The New Yorker.
- Gary Saul Morson (December 10, 2014). "Book Review: Persecution Complex, Stalin: Paradoxes of Power". The American Scholar.
- Donald Rayfield (November 1, 2014). "Review: A Georgian Caliban. Stalin, Vol 1: Paradoxes of Power, 1878–1928; By Stephen Kotkin". Literary Review.
- Norman Naimark (January 17, 2015). "Stalin: Paradoxes of Power, by Stephen Kotkin". Reason.
- Carl R. Trueman (December 1, 2014). "Learning From Kotkin's Stalin". First Things.

=== Awards and recognition ===
- Stalin: Paradoxes of Power, 1878-1928 was a finalist for the 2015 Pulitzer Prize in Biography.

== See also ==
- Bibliography of Stalinism and the Soviet Union
- Early life of Joseph Stalin
- Joseph Stalin's rise to power
- Stalin during the Russian Revolution, Civil War, and Polish–Soviet War
- Russian Civil War
- Polish–Soviet War
- Stalin: Breaker of Nations
- Stalinism
- History of Soviet Russia and the Soviet Union (1917–1927)
