= Nadezhda Alliluyeva =

Second wife of Joseph Stalin (1901–1932)

- Надежда Аллилуева
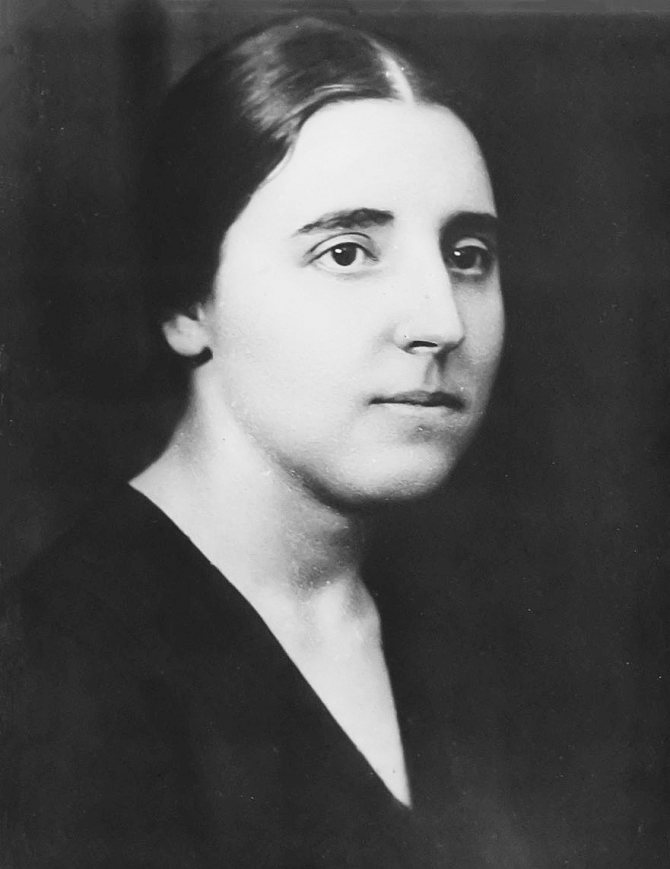

Spouse of the General Secretary of the Communist Party of the Soviet Union
- In office 3 April 1922 – 9 November 1932
- Preceded by: Polina Zhemchuzhina (de jure); Nadezhda Krupskaya (de facto)
- Succeeded by: Valeriya Golubtsova (de facto, from 1953)

Personal details
- Born: 22 September [O.S. 9 September] 1901 Baku, Russian Empire
- Died: 9 November 1932 (aged 31) Moscow, Soviet Union
- Resting place: Novodevichy Cemetery
- Spouse: Joseph Stalin (m. 1919)
- Children: Vasily Stalin; Svetlana Alliluyeva
- Occupation: Assistant; typist

Nadezhda Sergeyevna Alliluyeva (Note: Also known as Nadya or Nadia. In this name that follows East Slavic naming customs, the patronymic is Sergeyevna and the family name is Alliluyeva.) (Russian: Надежда Сергеевна Аллилуева; 22 September [O.S. 9 September] 1901 – 9 November 1932) was the second wife of Joseph Stalin.

She was born in Baku to a friend of Stalin, a revolutionary, and was raised in Saint Petersburg. Having known Stalin from a young age, they married when she was 17 and had two children. Alliluyeva worked as a secretary for Bolshevik leaders, including Vladimir Lenin and Stalin, before enrolling at the Industrial Academy in Moscow to study synthetic fibres and become an engineer. She had health issues, which had an adverse impact on her relationship with Stalin. She also suspected he was unfaithful, which led to frequent arguments with him. On several occasions, Alliluyeva reportedly contemplated leaving Stalin, and after an argument, she fatally shot herself early in the morning of 9 November 1932.

== Early life ==
=== Background ===
Alliluyeva's father, Sergei Alliluyev, was from a peasant family in Voronezh Oblast (modern southwest Russia). He moved to the Caucasus, where he worked as an electrician for the rail depot and first became familiar with working conditions in the Russian Empire. Sergei's paternal grandmother was Romani, a fact to which his granddaughter, Svetlana, attributed the "southern, somewhat exotic features" and "black eyes" that characterized the Alliluyevs. Sergei joined the Russian Social Democratic Labour Party (RSDLP) in 1898, and became an active member in workers' study circles; it was through these meetings he met Mikhail Kalinin, one of the chief organizers of the party in the Caucasus. Sergei had been arrested and exiled to Siberia, but by 1902 he had returned to the Caucasus. In 1904, he met Ioseb Jughashvili (later known as Joseph Stalin) while helping to move a printing machine from Baku to Tiflis. Her godfather was Avel Yenukidze who was a Georgian "Old Bolshevik" and associate of Stalin.

Alliluyeva's mother, Olga Fedotenko, was the youngest of nine children of Evgeni Fedotenko and Magdalena Eicholz. Alliluyeva's daughter Svetlana wrote in her memoir that Evgeni had Ukrainian ancestry on his father's side, his mother was Georgian, and he grew up speaking Georgian at home. Magdalena came from a family of German settlers, and spoke German and Georgian at home. Olga's father initially wanted her to marry one of his friend's sons, but she refused to accept the arrangements and left home at 14 to live with Sergei, joining him in Tiflis.

=== Youth ===
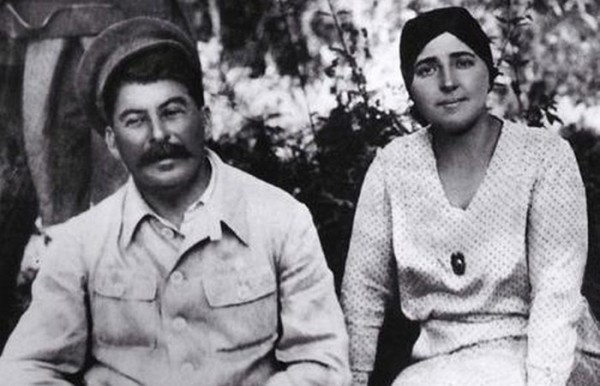
Alliluyeva with her husband Joseph Stalin in 1922.

Nadezhda Alliluyeva, born in Baku on 22 September [O.S. 9 September] 1901, was the youngest of four children, following Anna, Fyodor, and Pavel. The family moved to Moscow in 1904, but had returned to Baku by 1906. In 1907, to avoid arrest, Sergei moved the family to Saint Petersburg, where they would remain. The family would often help hide members of the Bolsheviks, a Russian revolutionary group, at their home, including Stalin. Sergei Aliluyev worked at an electricity station, and by 1911 was named head of a sector there, allowing the family to afford a comfortable lifestyle.

Exposed to revolutionary activity throughout her youth, Alliluyeva first became a supporter of the Bolsheviks while in school. Her family frequently hosted party members at their home, including hiding Vladimir Lenin during the July Days of 1917, which further strengthened Alliluyeva's views. After Lenin escaped Russia in August 1917, Stalin arrived. He had known Alliluyeva since she was a child, reportedly having saved her from drowning when they were both in Baku. It had been many years since they had last seen each other, and over the rest of the summer they became close. The couple married in February or March 1919. (Note: The date of the marriage was never recorded.) Stalin was a 40-year-old widower and father of one son (Yakov), born in 1907 to Stalin's first wife, Kato Svanidze, who died of typhus later that year. There was no ceremony for the marriage, as Bolsheviks frowned upon religious customs.

== Later life and career ==
=== Professional life ===
The Bolsheviks took power in Russia in November 1917 (O.S. October 1917), which led to the Russian Civil War. In 1918, Stalin as well as the Alliluyev family moved to Moscow, joining other Bolshevik leaders as the capital was transferred there from Petrograd. (Note: The city was originally named Saint Petersburg and was renamed Petrograd in 1914. It was renamed Leningrad in 1924.) They took up residence in the Amusement Palace (Note: Also known by its Russian name, Poteshny Palace.) of the Kremlin, occupying separate quarters. Stalin made Alliluyeva a secretary at the People's Commissariat for Nationalities, where he served as the head, and in May brought her and her brother Fyodor with him to Tsaritsyn, where the Bolsheviks were fighting the White Army as part of the Russian Civil War. Alliluyeva did not stay long there and returned to Moscow. After Stalin also had returned to Moscow, they were married in early 1919. In their early marriage, Stalin's involvement in the Civil War meant he was rarely at home. By 1921 the Civil War had ended, and in 1922 the Soviet Union was established, with Lenin taking the leading role.

Not wanting to be dependent on Stalin, Alliluyeva transferred positions and joined Lenin's secretariat under Lydia Fotieva. This allegedly annoyed Stalin, who wanted his wife to quit her job and remain at home. Alliluyeva was comfortable working for Lenin and his wife Nadezhda Krupskaya, also a Bolshevik functionary, as they were more lenient about her work than Stalin: for example, Lenin knew that Alliluyeva had left school at a young age and consequently forgave her for spelling errors.

In 1921, a few months after the birth of their first child, Vasily, Alliluyeva was expelled from the Bolshevik Party; according to historian Oleg Khlevniuk she had trouble managing family life, professional work, and party work, and was considered "ballast with no interest in the life of the party whatsoever". Although she was admitted back through the intercession of top party officials, including Lenin, her full status was not restored until 1924. Alliluyeva was concerned that if she did not work outside the home, she would not be taken seriously. She also desired to be qualified for any role she took up. After working in Lenin's office, Alliluyeva transferred to briefly work for Sergo Ordzhonikidze, a close friend of Stalin's and a fellow senior Bolshevik, and then on to the International Agrarian Institute in the Department of Agitation and Propaganda as an assistant.

Lenin died in 1924 and was ultimately succeeded as leader of the Soviet Union by Stalin. Tired of her work and not happy in her role as the "First Lady", Alliluyeva looked for something else to do with herself. Interested in education and wanting to be more involved with the party, in 1929 she enrolled in the Industrial Academy to study engineering and synthetic fibres, which was a new technology at the time, and became more active in local party meetings. As was the custom of the time, Alliluyeva registered using her maiden name, which also allowed her to keep a low profile; it is unclear if her associates knew who she was, though it is likely that at least the local party boss, Nikita Khrushchev, knew of her. Alliluyeva frequently took the tram from the Kremlin to the academy, joined by Dora Khazan, the wife of Andrey Andreyev, a leading Bolshevik and associate of Stalin. At the academy, Alliluyeva interacted with students from across the Soviet Union. Some have speculated that Alliluyeva learned of the issues the population was facing as a result of the collectivization of agriculture, including the famine in Russia, and argued with Stalin about this. Khlevniuk concludes that "there is absolutely no hard evidence that [Alliluyeva] objected to her husband's policies ... Her letters give the impression that she, like the rest of the Bolshevik elite, was completely isolated from the suffering of tens of millions outside the Kremlin walls."

=== Family life ===
Alliluyeva with her first son Vasily in 1922.

Alliluyeva had her first child, Vasily, in 1921. Historian Simon Sebag Montefiore noted that she walked to the hospital to give birth in a show of "Bolshevik austerity". A second child, daughter Svetlana, was born in 1926. In 1921, the family also took in Stalin's first son, Yakov Dzhugashvili, who had been living in Tiflis with his late mother's relatives. Alliluyeva was only six years older than her step-son, Dzhugashvili, with whom she developed a friendly relationship. Around the same time the family also took in Artyom Sergeyev, the son of Fyodor Sergeyev, a close friend of Stalin. Fyodor died four months after the birth of Artyom in an accident, and though his mother was still alive, the boy was raised in the Stalin household.

Interested in pursuing a professional career, Alliluyeva did not spend much time with her children, and instead hired a nanny, Alexandra Bychokova, to watch the children. When Alliluyeva dealt with her children, though, she was quite strict: Svetlana would later recall that the only letter she received from her mother scolded her for "being terribly naughty", despite Svetlana being only four or five at the time. She would also recall that the only person Stalin feared was Alliluyeva. Even so, Alliluyeva wanted to ensure the children received a good education.

During the week, the family would stay in their Kremlin apartment, where Alliluyeva maintained a simple lifestyle and controlled the family's expenses. On weekends, they would often go to their dacha on the outskirts of Moscow. Alliluyeva's siblings and their families lived nearby, and they would all frequently get together on these occasions. In the summer, Stalin would holiday along the coast of the Black Sea, near Sochi or in Abkhazia, and was frequently joined by Alliluyeva, though by 1929 she would spend only a few days there before returning to Moscow for her studies. Though apart, the two of them would frequently write letters to each other.

According to her close friend, Polina Zhemchuzhina, the marriage was strained, and the two argued frequently. Stalin believed that Alliluyeva's mother was schizophrenic. Karl Pauker, then head of Stalin's personal security, was an unwilling witness of their quarrels. "She is like a flint," Pauker said of Alliluyeva, "[Stalin] is very rough with her, but even he is afraid of her sometimes. Especially when the smile disappears from her face." She suspected Stalin was unfaithful with other women, though according to Boris Bazhanov, Stalin's one-time secretary, "women didn't interest [Stalin]. His own woman was enough for him, and he paid scant attention to her."

Along with her husband's alleged neglect, Alliluyeva's last years were darkened by ill health. She was suffering from "terrible depressions", headaches, and early menopause; her daughter later claimed that Alliluyeva had "feminine problems" because of a "couple of abortions which were never attended to". On several occasions, Alliluyeva reportedly considered leaving Stalin and taking the children with her, and in 1926 she left for a short time, moving to Leningrad. Stalin called her back, and she returned to stay with him. Her nephew Alexander Alliluyev would later claim that shortly before her death Alliluyeva was again planning to leave Stalin, but there is no evidence to confirm this assertion.

== Death ==
=== November 1932 ===
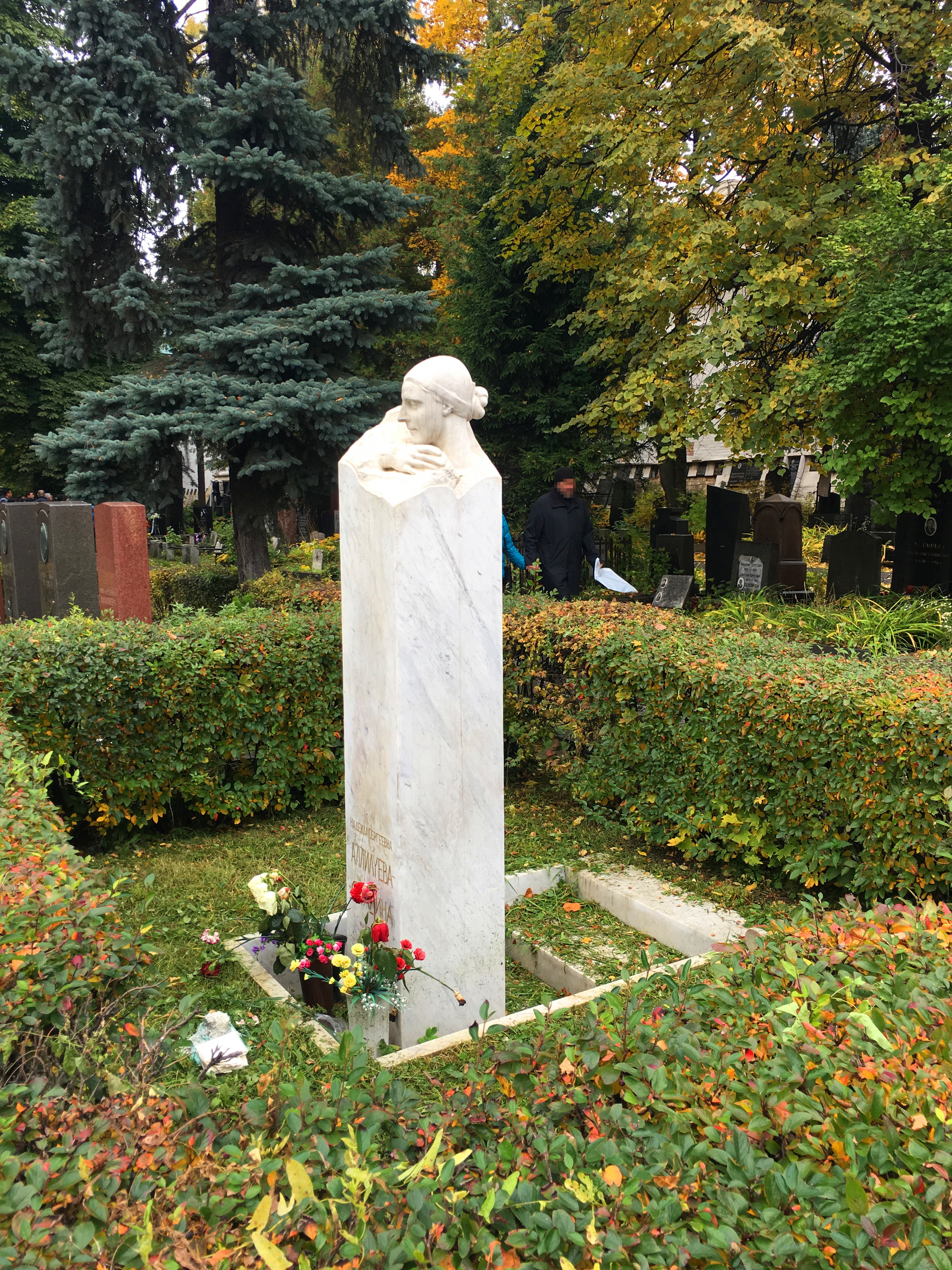
Alliluyeva's tomb in Novodevichy Cemetery

In November 1932, Alliluyeva was only a few weeks away from finishing her course at the academy. Alongside her compatriots, she marched in the 7 November parade commemorating the fifteenth anniversary of the October Revolution, while Stalin and the children watched her from the top of Lenin's Mausoleum on Red Square. After the parade finished, Alliluyeva complained of a headache, so the children went to their dacha outside the city while she returned to their residence in the Kremlin. The next evening both Alliluyeva and Stalin attended a dinner hosted at the Kremlin apartment of Kliment Voroshilov, a close friend of Stalin's and a member of the Politburo, to commemorate the Revolution. Though she preferred to dress modestly in a style more in line with the Bolshevik ideology, Alliluyeva dressed up for the occasion. There was much drinking during the dinner, which had several high-ranking Bolsheviks and their spouses in attendance, and Alliluyeva and Stalin began to argue, which was not an unusual occurrence at these gatherings. It has been suggested that Stalin was also flirting with Galina Yegorova, the young wife of Alexander Yegorov, and there was recent discussion that he had been with a hairdresser who worked in the Kremlin.

Things became even worse between the two, and Montefiore suggested that when Stalin "toasted the destruction of the Enemies of the State", he saw Alliluyeva did not raise her glass as well and became annoyed. Stalin supposedly threw something at her (listed variously as an orange peel, cigarette butt, or piece of bread) (Note: Sources differ on what specifically was thrown.) to get her attention, before finally calling out to her, which only further maddened Alliluyeva, who abruptly left the dinner and went outside; Zhemchuzhina followed after her to ensure someone else was there with her. The two women walked outside within the Kremlin Wall, discussing the events of the night, agreeing that Stalin was drunk, and talking about Alliluyeva's issues with Stalin's supposed affairs. The two parted ways and Alliluyeva returned to her residence.

Events after that are not clear, but some time early in the morning of 9 November, Alliluyeva, alone in her room, shot herself in the heart, killing herself instantly. Alliluyeva used a small Mauser pistol only recently given to her by her brother Pavel Alliluyev, who brought it as a gift from his time in Berlin. She had asked him to do so, noting that it could be dangerous alone in the Kremlin at times, and she wanted protection.

=== Funeral and burial ===
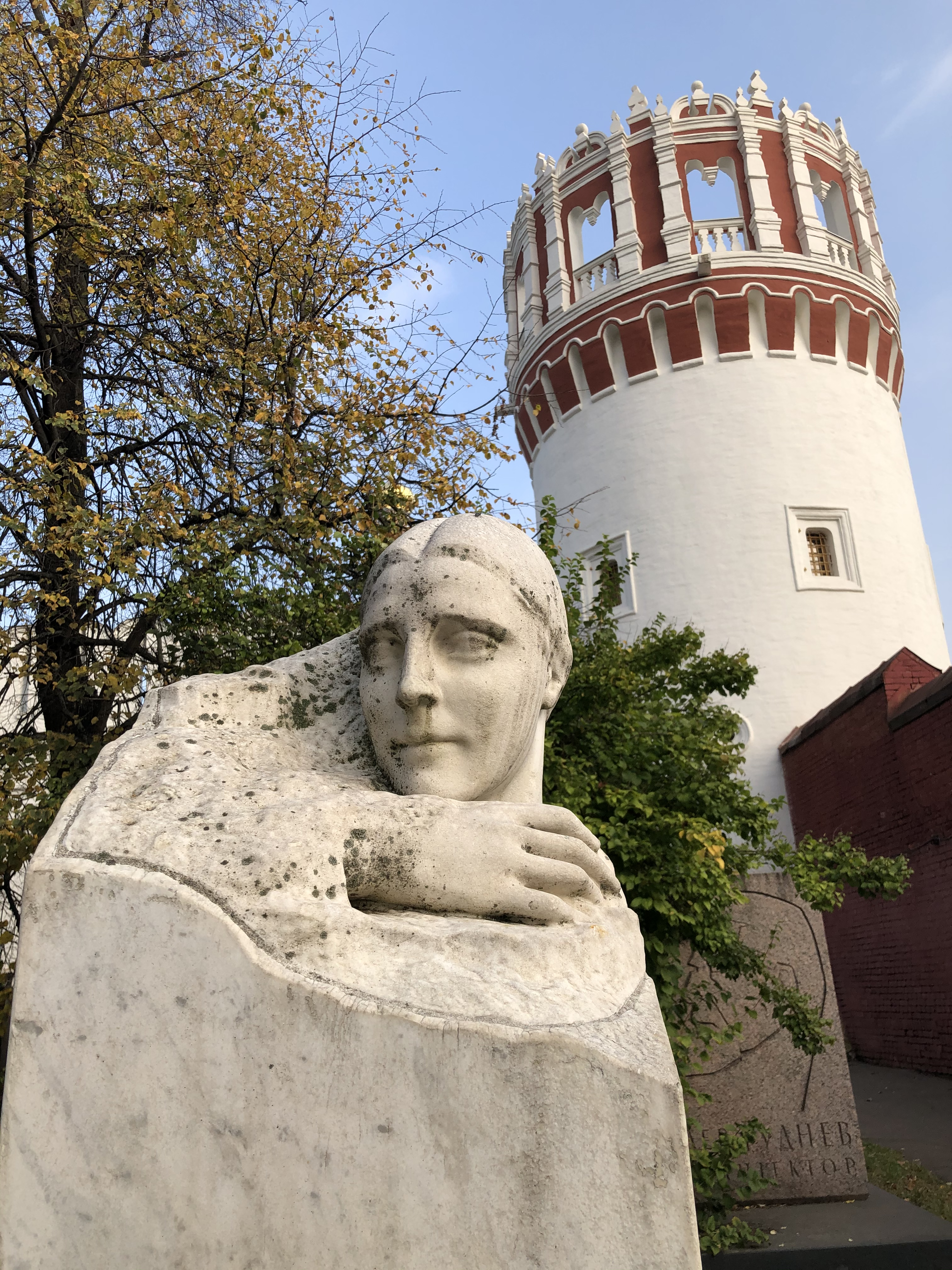
Bust of Alliluyeva on her tombstone

Stalin and the other leaders decided it would not be appropriate to say Alliluyeva had killed herself, so when her death was announced the next day, the cause of death was given as appendicitis. The children were not told the true nature of her death. To help keep the true nature of Alliluyeva's death from being released, staff who worked in the Kremlin at the time were either dismissed or arrested, though efforts to suppress this information continued for several years afterwards. Accounts of contemporaries and Stalin's letters indicate that he was much disturbed by the event, and even sat by her grave at night for hours at a time.

Pravda, the official party newspaper, announced Alliluyeva's death in its 10 November edition. This came as a surprise to many in the Soviet Union, as it also was the first public acknowledgement that Stalin had been married. Her body, in an open casket, was placed in an upper floor of the GUM department store, opposite Red Square and the Kremlin. Government and party officials came to visit, but the public was not allowed. The funeral was held on 12 November, with both Stalin and Vasily attending. Stalin took part in the procession to the cemetery afterwards, which involved a 6-kilometre (3.7 mi) march from GUM to the Novodevichy Cemetery, though it is not clear if he walked the entire route. In her memoirs, Svetlana claimed that Stalin never again visited the grave.

=== Aftermath ===
Alliluyeva's death had a profound impact on her children and family. Her daughter Svetlana only found out her mother had killed herself when reading an English journal article in 1942. The revelation came as a shock to her, and profoundly altered her relationship with Stalin, who had maintained the lie for a decade. She remained distant from Stalin until his death and took up her mother's maiden name in 1957 to further distance herself from him. She ultimately defected from the Soviet Union in 1967 and died in the United States in 2011.

Her son Vasily was also greatly affected; although Alliluyeva had not played a major role in raising her children, she still showed interest in their well-being. After her death, Stalin doted upon Svetlana but virtually ignored Vasily, who began to drink from a young age and ultimately died of alcohol-related issues in 1962.

Alliluyeva's father, Sergei, became very withdrawn after her death. He wrote memoirs which were published in 1946 after heavy editing. He died of stomach cancer in 1945. Alliluyeva's mother, Olga, lived until 1951, dying of a heart attack. Several of Alliluyeva's relatives were arrested and imprisoned in 1940, including her sister Anna, and Anna's husband, Stanislav Redens, who was shot in January that year.
