= Simon Sebag Montefiore =

British historian and writer (born 1965)

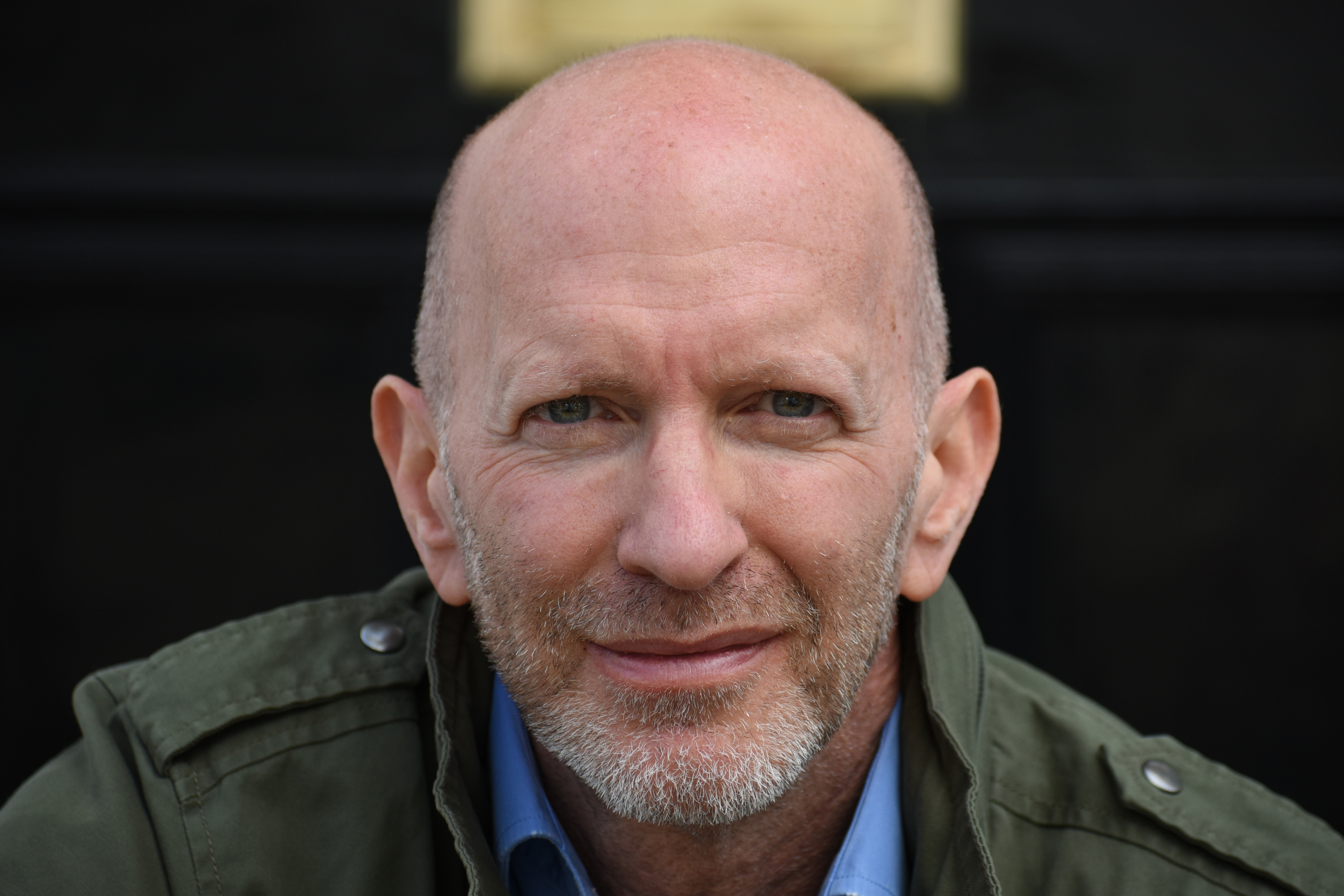
- Sebag Montefiore in 2018
- Born: Simon Jonathan Sebag Montefiore; 27 June 1965 (age 61); London, England
- Education: Gonville and Caius College, Cambridge
- Occupation: Historian
- Spouse: Santa Palmer-Tomkinson
- Children: 2

Simon Jonathan Sebag Montefiore (/ˈsiːbæɡ ˌmɒntəfiˈɔːri/ SEE-bag MON-tə-fee-OR-ee; born 27 June 1965) is a British historian, television presenter and author of history books and novels, including Stalin: The Court of the Red Tsar (2003), Jerusalem: The Biography (2011), The Romanovs: 1613–1918 (2016), and The World: A Family History of Humanity (2022).

In 2026, Knopf published his history of the modern Near East, The Cauldron: The Making of the Modern Middle East.

== Early life ==
Simon Sebag Montefiore was born in London into a family of Jewish descent that had escaped Romanov Russia's pogroms. His father was psychotherapist Stephen Eric Sebag Montefiore (1926–2014), a great-grandson of the banker Sir Joseph Sebag-Montefiore, the nephew and heir of the wealthy philanthropist Sir Moses Montefiore.

Simon's mother was Phyllis April Jaffé (1927–2019) from the Lithuanian Jewish branch of the Jaffe family. Her parents fled the Russian Empire at the beginning of the 20th century. They bought tickets for New York City, but were cheated, being instead dropped off at Cork, Ireland. In 1904, due to the Limerick boycott, her father, Henry Jaffé, left the country and moved to Newcastle upon Tyne, England. Simon's brother is Hugh Sebag-Montefiore.

Sebag Montefiore was educated at Ludgrove School and at Harrow School, where he was editor of the school newspaper, The Harrovian. At the age of 17, he worked in South African gold mines, saying in 2023 "These were the last years of apartheid. I wanted to see its collapse first-hand."

In the autumn of 1983 he interviewed UK prime minister Margaret Thatcher for The Harrovian. He won an exhibition to read history at Gonville and Caius College, Cambridge, where he received his MA (Cantab) and Doctorate of Philosophy (PhD) degrees.

== Career ==
Sebag Montefiore worked as a banker, a foreign affairs journalist, and a war correspondent covering the conflicts during the fall of the Soviet Union.

Sebag Montefiore's book Catherine the Great & Potemkin was shortlisted for the Samuel Johnson Prize, the Duff Cooper Prize, and the Marsh Biography Award. Stalin: The Court of the Red Tsar won History Book of the Year at the 2004 British Book Awards. Young Stalin won the LA Times Book Prize for Best Biography, the Costa Book Award, the Bruno Kreisky Award for Political Literature, Grand prix de la biographie politique du Touquet-Paris-Plage and was shortlisted for the James Tait Black Memorial Prize.

Jerusalem: The Biography was a number one non-fiction Sunday Times bestseller and a global bestseller and won the Jewish Book of the Year Award from the Jewish Book Council. It also won a Chinese literary prize, the 10th Wenjin Book Prize, awarded by the National Library of China.

Sebag Montefiore is also the author of the novels One Night in Winter and Sashenka. One Night in Winter won the Political Novel of the Year Prize and was longlisted for the Orwell Prize. He is a Fellow of the Royal Society of Literature and a Visiting Professor of Humanities at the University of Buckingham.

== Personal life ==
Montefiore lives in London with his wife, the novelist Santa Montefiore (née Palmer-Tomkinson). They have two children. He and his wife were brought together by the historian Andrew Roberts, who thought "they would be absolutely perfect for each other because they were the only two people he knew who could remember the words to Evita off by heart". The couple are friends of King Charles III and Queen Camilla. Montefiore was appointed as a Trustee of the National Portrait Gallery in September 2021.

He publishes as Simon Sebag Montefiore but prefers to be addressed as Sebag Montefiore.

== Films and TV drama series ==
Several of Montefiore's books are now being developed as either films or TV drama series. In February 2017, Angelina Jolie announced that she was developing "Simon Sebag Montefiore's Catherine the Great and Potemkin" with Universal Studios. Also in early 2017, the film studio Lionsgate Films announced it had bought Montefiore's Jerusalem: the Biography to make it into a long running multi episodic TV drama series which will be "character-driven, action-filled account of war, betrayal, faith, fanaticism, slaughter, persecution and co-existence in the universal holy city through the ages." Montefiore has likened it to Game of Thrones. The film scriptwriter and director Neil Jordan has been attached to the project to adapt the book for television, and he will also be acting as producer.

In April 2016, 21st Century Fox announced that its animated division Blue Sky Studios, makers of the Ice Age series, had bought Royal Rabbits of London, the children's series of books written by Montefiore and Santa Montefiore, to develop into an animated feature film. In July 2018 it was announced that the screenwriter Will Davies has been attached to the project to adapt the book for the screen. Also in July 2018, it was announced that Hat Trick Productions had taken up an option on Montefiore's novel One Night in Winter, in order to make a TV adaptation.

== Reviews ==
=== The Romanovs ===
The book received several favourable reviews including by Olga Grushin, Antony Beevor and Stephen Kotkin. According to Kotkin, "No author on Russia writes better than Montefiore whose perceptiveness and portraiture here are frequently sublime ... a marvellous read and the last third from fin de siecle insanity to revolutionary cataclysm is dazzling." Swedish historian Dick Harrison criticized the book for inaccuracies.

=== The World: a Family History of Humanity ===
In 2022 Montefiore produced a world history: The World: a Family History of Humanity. It received positive reviews. The Economist said: "Don't be put off by the doorstopper length: this is a riveting page-turner. The author brings his cast of dynastic titans, rogues and psychopaths to life with pithy, witty pen portraits, ladling on the sex and violence. An epic that both entertains and informs."

The New Yorker noted that the book was "[a] monumental survey of dynastic rule: how to get it, how to keep it, how to squander it ... Montefiore energetically fulfills his promise to write a 'genuine world history, not unbalanced by excessive focus on Britain and Europe.' In zesty sentences and lively vignettes, he captures the widening global circuits of people, commerce, and culture."

For The Times, Gerard DeGroot summed up the book as "[a] history of the world from the Neanderthals to Trump. It's a rollicking tale, a kaleidoscope of savagery, sex, cruelty and chaos. By focusing on family, Montefiore provides an intimacy usually lacking in global histories. [It] has personality and a soul. It's also outrageously funny . . . an enormously entertaining book."

== Fiction reviews ==
Montefiore's debut novel King's Parade was published in 1991. The Spectator called the book "embarrassing" and "extremely silly".

Montefiore has written a Moscow trilogy of fictional thrillers, set in Russia. These have received positive reviews. The first book, Sashenka (2008, was described by The Washington Post as "Spellbinding. Sashenka is a historical whodunit with the epic sweep of a Hollywood movie. Montefiore is a natural storyteller who brings his encyclopedic knowledge of Russian history to life in language that glitters like the ice of St Petersburg". The Wall Street Journal praised "This superb novel. Sashenka is unforgettable. Inspiring. Montefiore proves a matchless storyteller, his prose harrowing and precise." One Night in Winter (2013) was described by The Guardian as "A gripping thriller about private life and poetic dreams in Stalin's Russia... A gripping pageturner... Whether its subject is power or love, a darkly enjoyable read." The last novel in the trilogy, Red Sky at Noon (2017), was called "a deeply satisfying pageturner – mythic and murderous" by The Times and "brilliant on multiple levels ... offering historical accuracy, a fine empathy for his characters and a story that illuminates the operatic tragedy of Stalin's Russia" by Booklist.

== Books ==
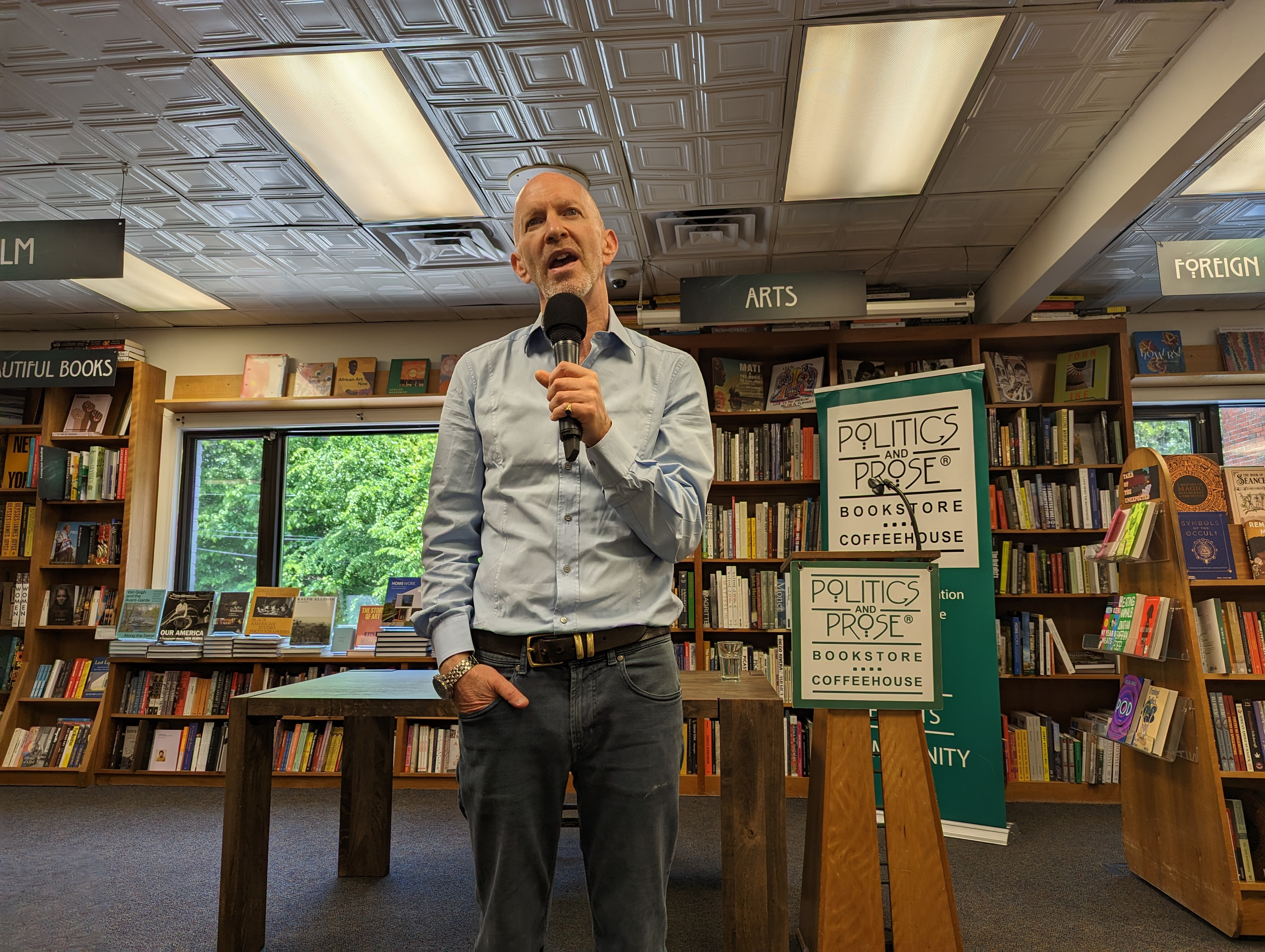
Montefiore giving an author talk at Politics and Prose on The World: A Family History (20 May 2023)

=== Non-fiction ===
- Catherine the Great and Potemkin (2001; originally published as The Prince of Princes: The Life of Potemkin)
- Stalin: The Court of the Red Tsar (2003)
- Young Stalin (2007)
- Monsters: History's Most Evil Men and Women (2008)
- Jerusalem: The Biography (2011)
- Titans of History (2012)
- The Romanovs: 1613–1918 (2016)
- Written in History: Letters That Changed the World (2018)
- The World: A Family History of Humanity (2022)
- The Cauldron: The Making of the Modern Middle East (2026)

=== Fiction ===
- King's Parade (1991)
- My Affair with Stalin (1997)
- Sashenka (2008)
- One Night in Winter (2013)
- Red Sky at Noon (2017)

=== Children's books ===
- With Santa Montefiore:
  - Royal Rabbits of London (2016)
  - Royal Rabbits of London: Escape from the Tower (2017)
  - Royal Rabbits of London: The Great Diamond Chase (2018)
  - Royal Rabbits of London: The Hunt for the Golden Carrot (2019)

== Television ==
- Jerusalem: The Making of a Holy City, 3 part series, 8 December 2011 – 23 December 2011
- Rome: A History of the Eternal City, 3 part series, 5–19 December 2012
- Byzantium: A Tale of Three Cities, 3 part series, 5 December 2013 – 19 December 2013
- Blood and Gold: The Making of Spain, 3 part series, 8 December 2015 – 22 December 2015
- Vienna: Empire, Dynasty And Dream, 3 part series, 8 December 2016 – 22 December 2016rebroadcast August 2025

== CDs ==
- Speeches that Changed The World

== DVDs ==
- Jerusalem: The Making of a Holy City, BBC, 2011
- Byzantium and the History of Faith
