= Stephen Kotkin =

American historian, academic and author (born 1959)

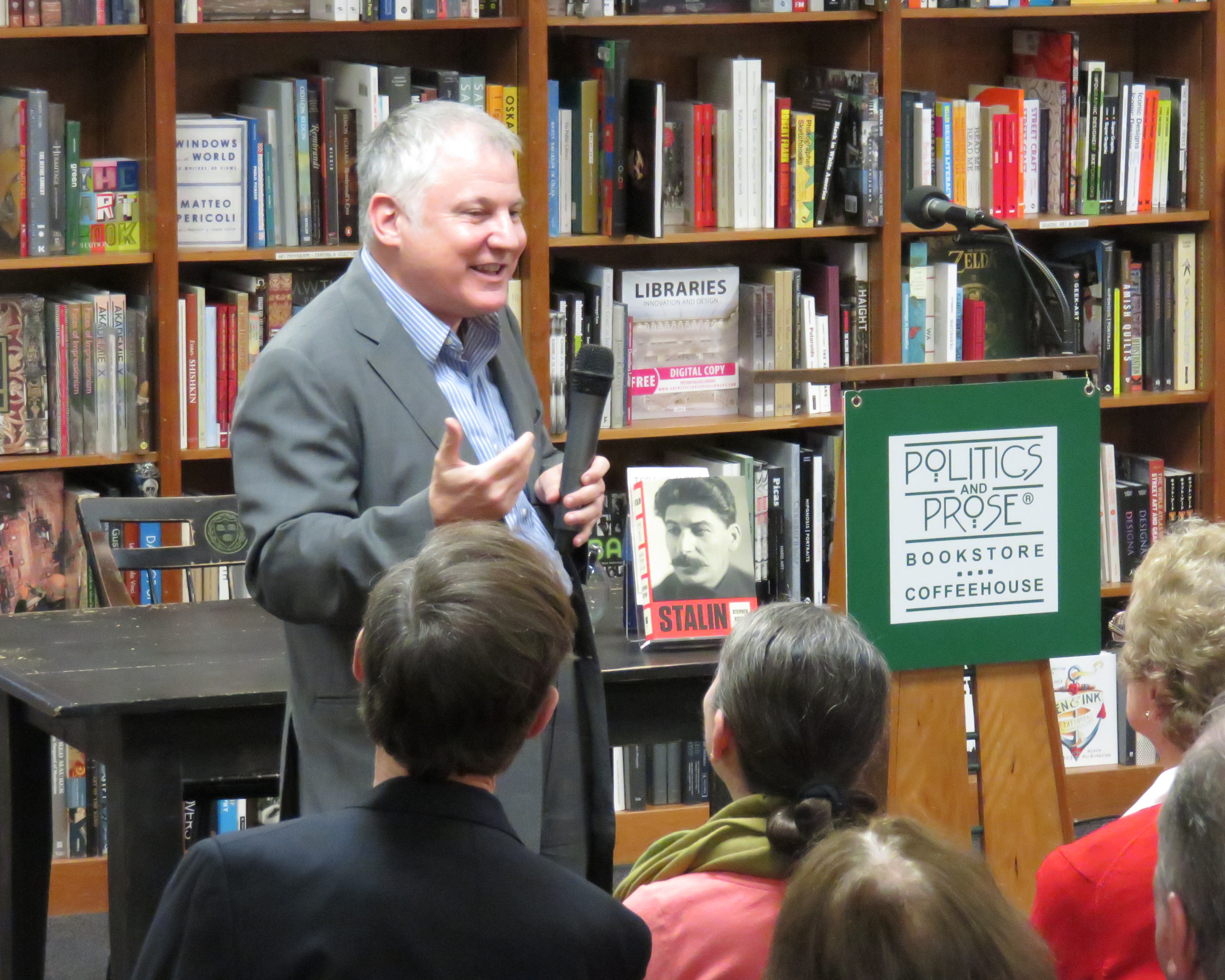
- Kotkin speaking at Politics and Prose in 2015
- Born: February 17, 1959 (age 67); Englewood, New Jersey, U.S.
- Education: University of Rochester (BA); University of California, Berkeley (MA, PhD)
- Occupations: Historian, academic, author
- Spouse: Soyoung Lee
- Children: 2
- Writing career
- Genres: Russian and Soviet politics and history, communism, global history
- Subjects: Authoritarianism, geopolitics
- Notable works: Stalin: Paradoxes of Power, 1878–1928 (2014); Stalin: Waiting for Hitler, 1929–1941 (2017); Armageddon Averted: the Soviet Collapse, 1970–2000 (2001)

Stephen Mark Kotkin (born February 17, 1959) is an American historian, academic, and author. He is the Kleinheinz Senior Fellow at the Hoover Institution and a senior fellow at the Freeman Spogli Institute for International Studies at Stanford University.

For 33 years, Kotkin taught at Princeton University, where he attained the title of John P. Birkelund '52 Professor in History and International Affairs; he took on emeritus status from Princeton University in 2022. He was the director of the Princeton Institute for International and Regional Studies and the co-director of the certificate-granting program in History and the Practice of Diplomacy.

Kotkin's most prominent book project is his three-volume biography of Joseph Stalin: The first two volumes have been published as Stalin: Paradoxes of Power, 1878–1928 (2014) and Stalin: Waiting for Hitler, 1929–1941 (2017).

== Early life and education ==
Kotkin was born in New Jersey, the third son of Jay Kotkin, a factory worker of Belarusian-Jewish descent, and Joanne Korolewicz, a cook and art teacher. His father's family emigrated from Vitebsk in the Russian Empire (now Belarus). He grew up in New York City.

He graduated from the University of Rochester in 1981 with a B.A. degree in English. He studied Russian and Soviet history under Reginald E. Zelnik and Martin Malia at the University of California, Berkeley, where he earned an M.A. degree in 1983 and a Ph.D. degree in 1988, both in history. Initially, his PhD studies focused on the House of Habsburg and the History of France, until an encounter with Michel Foucault persuaded him to look at the relationship between knowledge and power with respect to Stalin.

Starting in 1986, Kotkin traveled to the Soviet Union, conducting academic research and receiving academic fellowships. He was a visiting scholar at the USSR Academy of Sciences (1991) and then at its descendant, the Russian Academy of Sciences (1993, 1995, 1998, 1999 and 2012). He was also a visiting scholar at the University of Tokyo's Institute of Social Science in 1994 and 1997.

== Academic career ==
Kotkin joined the faculty at Princeton University in 1989. He served as the director of the Russian and Eurasian Studies Program for thirteen years (1995–2008) and as the co-director of the certificate program in History and the Practice of Diplomacy from 2015 to 2022. He is now the Kleinheinz Senior Fellow at the Hoover Institution.

== Author ==
Kotkin has written several nonfiction books about history as well as textbooks. Among scholars of Russia, he is best known for Magnetic Mountain: Stalinism as a Civilization which exposes the realities of everyday life in the Soviet city of Magnitogorsk during the 1930s. This early work, based on his PhD thesis, described Stalinism as "a quintessential Enlightenment utopia, an attempt via the instrumentality of the state, to impose a rational ordering on society, while at the same time overcoming the wrenching class divisions brought about by nineteenth-century industrialization."

In 2001, he published Armageddon Averted, a short history of the fall of the Soviet Union. He is a frequent contributor on Russian and Eurasian affairs and he also writes book and film reviews for various publications, including The New Republic, The New Yorker, the Financial Times, The New York Times and The Washington Post. He also contributed as a commentator for NPR and the BBC. In 2017, Kotkin wrote in The Wall Street Journal that Communist democide resulted in the deaths of at least 65 million people between 1917 and 2017, stating: "Though communism has killed huge numbers of people intentionally, even more of its victims have died from starvation as a result of its cruel projects of social engineering."

His first volume in a projected trilogy on the life of Stalin, Stalin: Paradoxes of Power, 1878–1928 (976 pp., Penguin Random House, 2014) analyzes his life through 1928, and was a Pulitzer Prize finalist. It received reviews in newspapers, magazines, and academic journals,

The second volume, Stalin: Waiting for Hitler, 1929–1941 (1184 pp., Penguin Random House, 2017) also received several reviews, magazines, and academic journals upon its release. In these books, among other things, Stephen Kotkin suggested that Lenin's Testament was authored by Nadezhda Krupskaya. Kotkin pointed out that the purported dictations were not logged in the customary manner by Lenin's secretariat at the time they were supposedly given; that they were typed, with no shorthand originals in the archives, and that Lenin did not affix his initials to them; that by the alleged dates of the dictations, Lenin had lost much of his power of speech following a series of small strokes on December 15–16, 1922, raising questions about his ability to dictate anything as detailed and intelligible as the Testament and that the dictation given in December 1922 is suspiciously responsive to debates that took place at the 12th Communist Party Congress in April 1923. However, the Testament has been accepted as genuine by many historians, including E. H. Carr, Isaac Deutscher, Dmitri Volkogonov, Vadim Rogovin and Oleg Khlevniuk. Kotkin's claims were also rejected by Richard Pipes soon after they were published, who claimed Kotkin contradicted himself by citing documents in which Stalin referred to the Testament as the "known letter of comrade Lenin." Pipes also points to the inclusion of the document in Lenin's Collected Works.

In his analysis of Soviet leadership, Kotkin observes that even in private communication, the Bolsheviks "spoke the same way to each other, when no one was listening, as they spoke in their public propaganda."

The third and final volume, Stalin: Totalitarian Superpower, is set to be published in "several years", according to Kotkin in November 2024. He is currently writing a multi-century history of Siberia, focusing on the Ob River Valley.

== Awards ==
He has won a number of awards and fellowships, including the Guggenheim Fellowship, the American Council of Learned Societies, and the National Endowment for the Humanities Fellowship.

== Personal life ==
Kotkin is the husband of curator and art historian Soyoung Lee.

== Published works ==
Year	Title	Collaborator(s)	Publisher	ISBN
1991	Steeltown, USSR: Soviet Society in the Gorbachev Era		Berkeley: University of California; paperback with afterword in 1993	ISBN 0962262900
1995	Rediscovering Russia in Asia: Siberia and the Russian Far East		M. E. Sharpe	ISBN 1563245469
1995	Magnetic Mountain: Stalinism as a Civilization		Berkeley: University of California	ISBN 0520069080
2001	Armageddon Averted: the Soviet Collapse, 1970–2000		Oxford and New York: Oxford University; paperback with new preface, 2003; updated edition 2008	ISBN 0192802453
2002	Political Corruption in Transition: A Sceptic's Handbook	Co-authored with András Sajó	Central European University Press	ISBN 9639241466
2003	The Cultural Gradient: The Transmission of Ideas in Europe, 1789–1991	Co-authored with Catherine Evtuhov	Rowman & Littlefield	ISBN 0742520625
2005	Korea at the Center: Dynamics of Regionalism in Northeast Asia	Co-authored with Charles K. Armstrong, Gilbert Rozman, and Samuel S. Kim	M. E. Sharpe	
2009	Uncivil Society: 1989 and the Implosion of Communist Establishment	With a contribution by Jan Gross	New York: Modern Library/Random House	ISBN 978-0679642763
2010	Manchurian Railways and the Opening of China: An International History	Edited with Bruce A. Elleman	M. E. Sharpe	ISBN 978-0765625144
2014	Historical Legacies of Communism in Russia and Eastern Europe	Co-edited with Mark Beissinger	Cambridge University Press	ISBN 1107054176
2014	Stalin: Volume I: Paradoxes of Power, 1878–1928		Penguin Press	ISBN 1594203792
2017	Stalin: Volume II: Waiting for Hitler, 1929–1941		Penguin Press	ISBN 978-1594203800

== Political views ==
When speaking about the 2022 Russian invasion of Ukraine in an interview with Foreign Affairs, Kotkin suggested that a serious threat of regime change in Russia could ultimately motivate Vladimir Putin to stop the war. Kotkin also described Donald Trump's foreign policy regarding the war in Ukraine as unpredictable, and said he thought it was unlikely that Trump would succeed in becoming an autocrat, given the existing checks and balances in the United States' political system.

In an article in Foreign Affairs magazine, Kotkin proposed a series of policies to better prepare the American economy and society for international confrontation with China and Russia. He called for the expansion of STEM education, stating that it makes little sense to admit students " lacking the universal language of science, engineering, computers, and economics" and that students would be "limited to majoring in themselves and their grievances." He likewise called for the expansion of community colleges and trade schools. In the article Kotkin also stated his belief that drastic cutbacks of environmental regulations and cutting housing construction subsidies would allow the free market to construct housing faster, and also called for mandatory national service for young Americans.

== Works cited ==
- Kotkin, Stephen (2014). Stalin: Paradoxes of Power, 1878–1928. London: Allen Lane. ISBN 978-0-7139-9944-0.
