= Early life of Joseph Stalin =

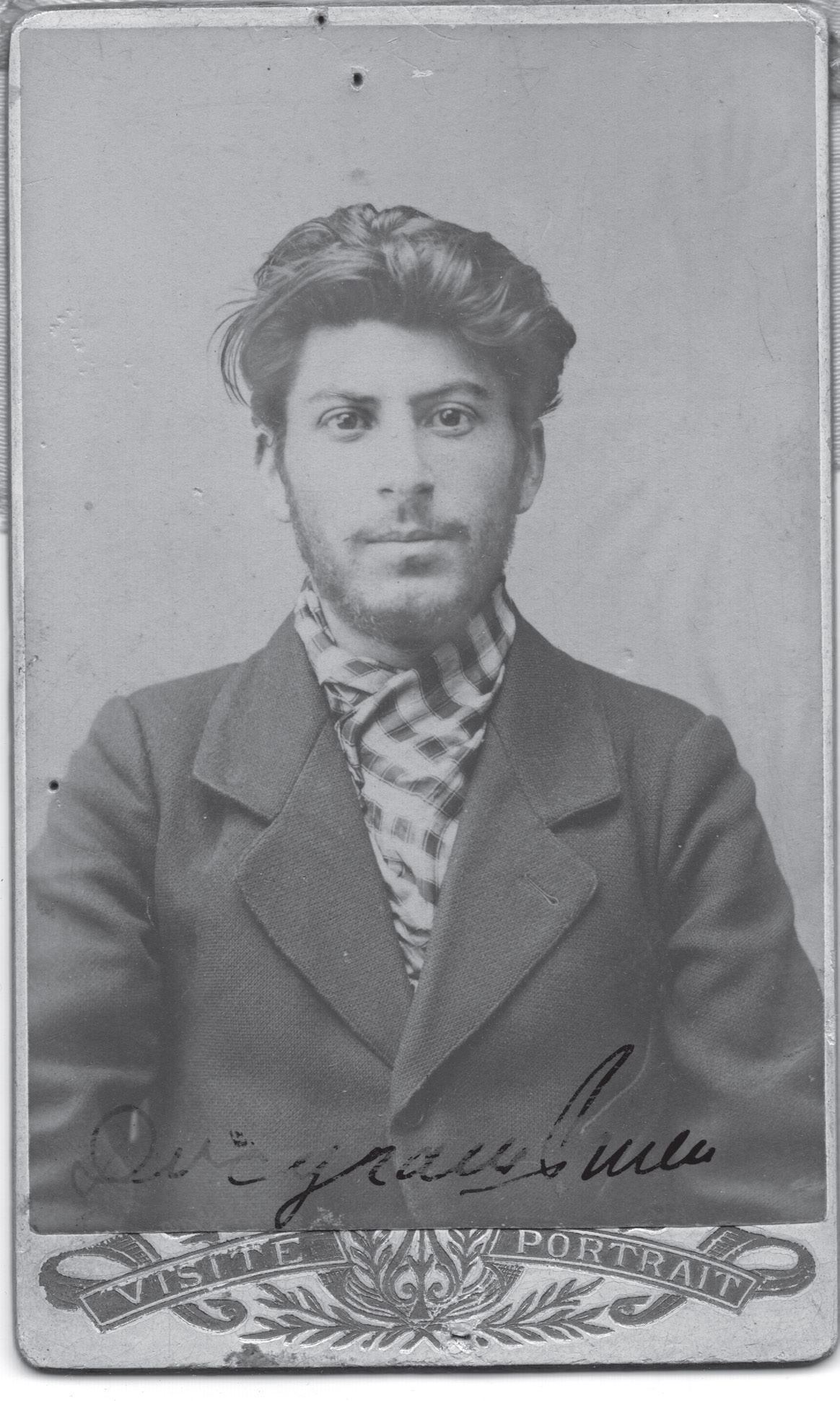
Police photo of Joseph Stalin, 1902

The early life of Joseph Stalin covers the period from Stalin's birth, on 18 December 1878 (6 December according to the Old Style), until the October Revolution on 7 November 1917 (25 October). Born Ioseb Besarionis dze Jughashvili in Gori, Georgia, to a cobbler and a house cleaner, he grew up in the city and attended school there before moving to Tiflis (modern-day Tbilisi) to join the Tiflis Seminary. While a student at the seminary, he embraced Marxism and became an avid follower of Vladimir Lenin, and left the seminary to become a revolutionary figure. After being marked by Russian secret police for his activities, he became a full-time revolutionary figure and was involved in a various criminal activities which included robbery, kidnapping and arson. He became one of the Bolsheviks' chief operatives in the Caucasus, organizing paramilitaries, spreading propaganda, and utilizing extortion. Stalin was captured and exiled to Siberia numerous times, but often escaped. He became one of Lenin's closest associates, which helped him rise to the heights of power after the Russian Revolution. In 1913, Stalin was exiled to Siberia for the final time and remained in exile until the February Revolution of 1917 led to the overthrow of the Russian Empire.

== Childhood: 1878–1893 ==
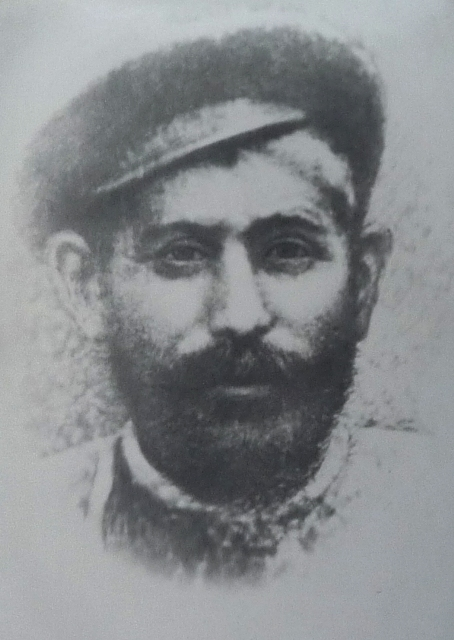
Stalin’s father, Besarion

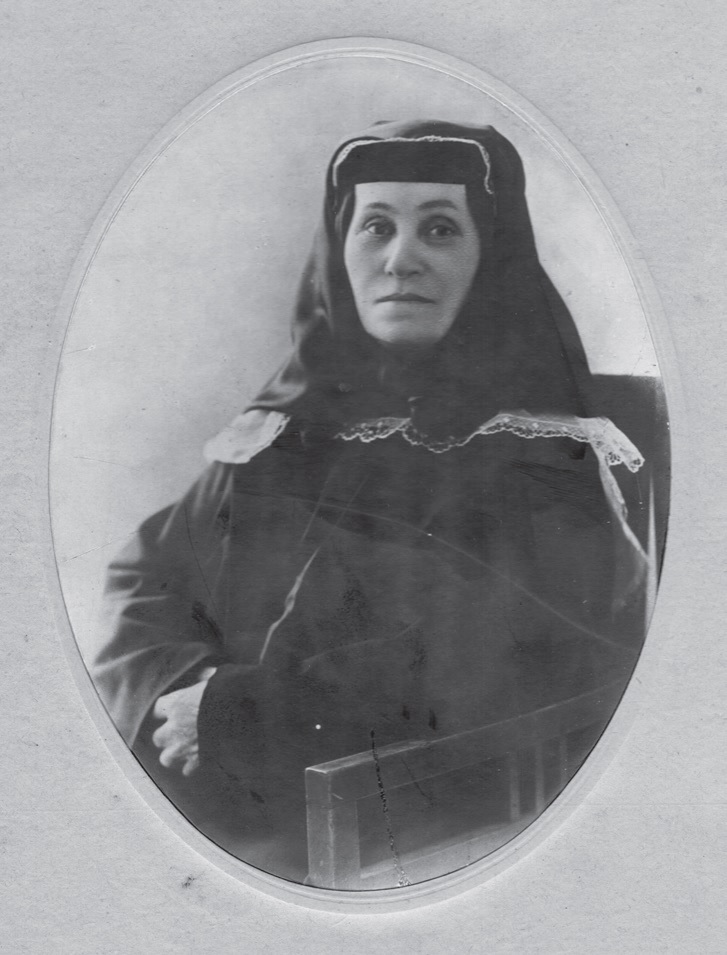
Stalin’s mother, Ekaterine

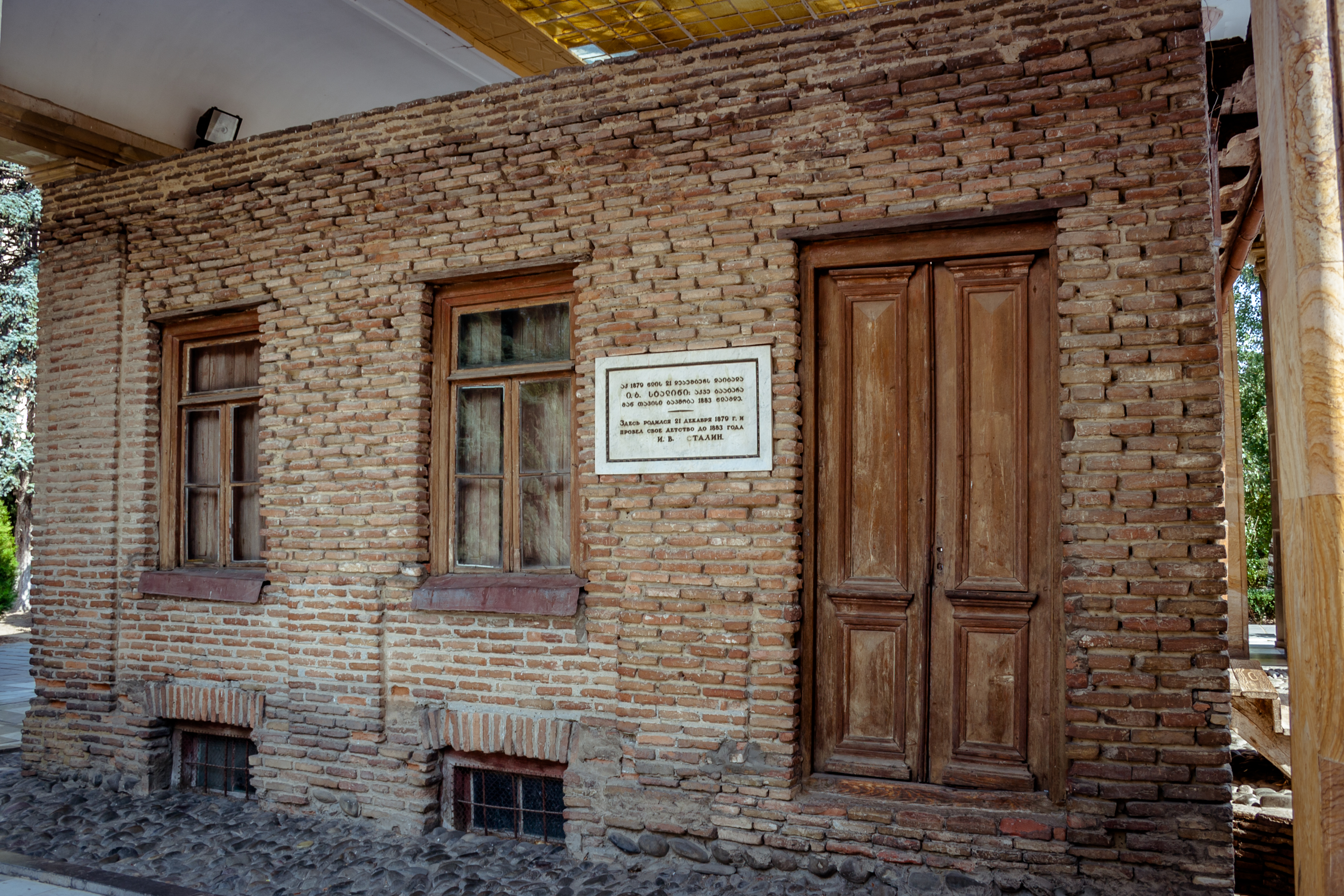
The house Stalin was born in

Stalin was born Ioseb Besarionis dze Jughashvili on 18 December [O.S. 6 December] 1878 (Note: Official Soviet biographies listed Stalin's birthdate as 21 December 1879. It is not clear why he falsified it. See Khlevniuk (2015), p. 11) in the town of Gori, in what is today the country of Georgia. He was baptised on 29 December [O.S. 17 December] 1878 and christened Ioseb, and known by the diminutive "Soso". (Note: Full Georgian name "Ioseb Besarionis dze Jughashvilli" (იოსებ ბესარიონის ძე ჯუღაშვილი); Russified to "Iosif Vissarionovich Dzhugashvili" (Иосиф Виссарионович Джугашвили)) His parents were Ekaterine (Keke) and Besarion Jughashvili (Beso). He was their third child; the first two, Mikheil and Giorgi, had died in infancy.

Stalin's father, Besarion, was a shoemaker and owned a workshop that at one point employed as many as ten people, but which slid into ruin as Stalin grew up. Beso had specialised in producing traditional Georgian footwear and did not produce the European-style shoes that were becoming increasingly fashionable. This, combined with the deaths of his previous two infant sons, precipitated his decline into alcoholism. The family found themselves living in poverty. The couple had to leave their home and move into nine different rented rooms over ten years.

Besarion also became violent towards his family. To escape the abusive relationship, Keke took Stalin and moved into the house of a family friend, Father Christopher Charkviani. She worked as a house cleaner and launderer for several local families who were sympathetic to her plight. Keke was a strict but affectionate mother to Stalin. She was a devout Christian, and both she and her son regularly attended church services. In 1884, Stalin contracted smallpox, which left him with facial pock marks for the rest of his life. Charkviani's teenaged sons taught Stalin the Russian language. Keke was determined to send her son to school, something that none of the family had previously achieved. In late 1888, when Stalin was ten, he enrolled at the Gori Church School. This was normally reserved for the children of clergy, but Charkviani ensured that Stalin received a place by claiming that the boy was the son of a deacon. This may be the reason why—in 1934—Stalin claimed to have been the son of a priest. There were many local rumours that Beso was not Stalin's real father, which in later life Stalin himself encouraged. Stalin biographer Simon Sebag Montefiore nonetheless thought it likely that Beso was the father, in part due to the strong physical resemblance that they shared. Beso eventually attacked a policeman while drunk which resulted in the authorities ejecting him from Gori. He moved to Tiflis, where he worked at the Adelkhanov shoe factory.

Although Keke was poor, she ensured that her son was well dressed when he went to school, likely through the financial support of family friends. As a child, Stalin exhibited a number of idiosyncrasies; when happy, he would for instance jump around on one leg while clicking his fingers and yelling aloud. He excelled academically, and also displayed talent in painting and drama classes. He began writing poetry, and was a fan of the work of Georgian nationalist writer Raphael Eristavi. He was also a choirboy, singing both in church and at local weddings. A childhood friend of Stalin's later recalled that he "was the best but also the naughtiest pupil" in the class. He and his friends formed a gang, and often fought with other local children. He caused mischief; in one incident, he ignited explosive cartridges in a shop, and in another, he tied a pan to the tail of a woman's pet cat.

When Stalin was twelve, he was seriously injured after having been hit by a phaeton. He was hospitalised in Tiflis for several months and sustained a lifelong disability in his left arm. His father subsequently kidnapped him and enrolled him as an apprentice cobbler in the factory; this would be Stalin's only experience as a worker. According to Stalin's biographer Robert Service, this was Stalin's "first experience with capitalism", and it was "raw, harsh and dispiriting". Several priests from Gori retrieved the boy, after which Beso cut all contact with his wife and son. In February 1892, Stalin's school teachers took him and the other pupils to witness the public hanging of several peasant bandits; Stalin and his friends sympathized with the condemned. The event left a deep and lasting impression on him. Stalin had decided that he wanted to become a local administrator so that he could deal with the problems of poverty that affected the population around Gori. Despite his Christian upbringing, he had become an atheist after contemplating the problem of evil and learning about evolution through Charles Darwin's On the Origin of Species.

== Tiflis Seminary: 1893–1899 ==
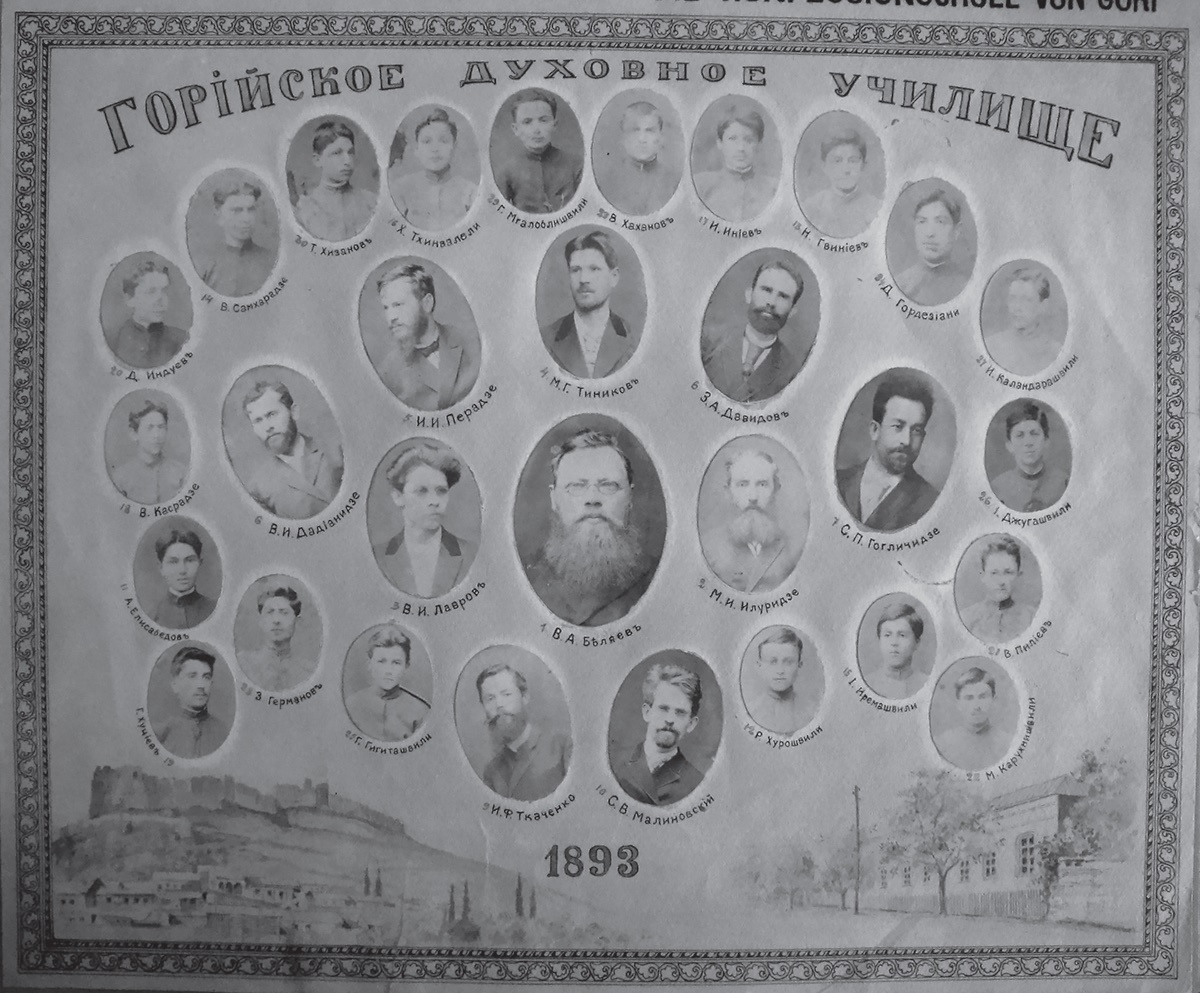
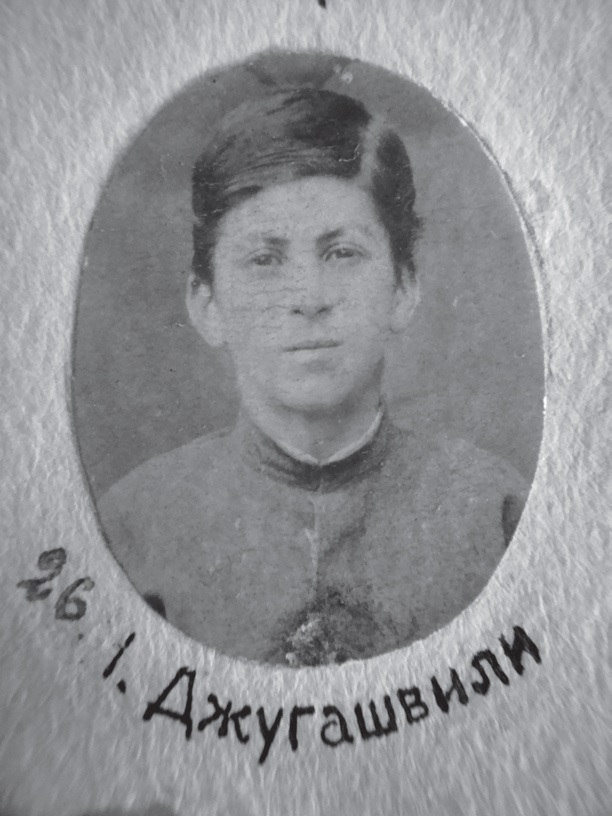
1893 class table of Gori Religious School, includes picture of Stalin. Even though the table was created in 1893, the photographs might be from an earlier date, it’s believed that this photograph of Stalin was taken in 1893.

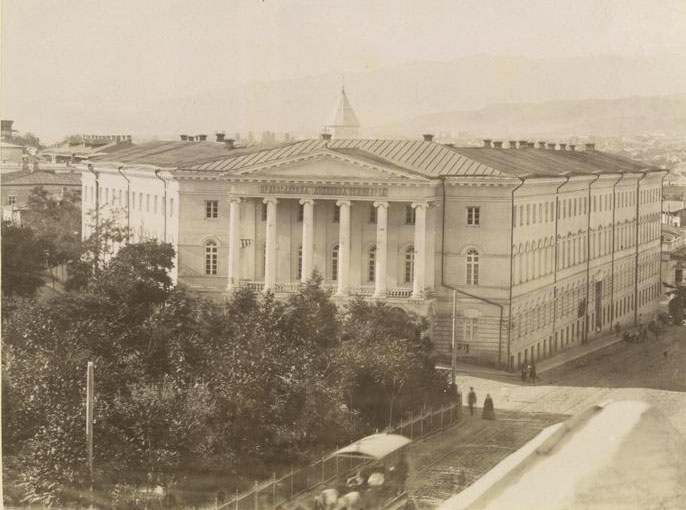
The Russian Orthodox Theological Seminary from the side of the Soldier's Bazaar, 1870's

In July 1893, Stalin passed his exams, and his teachers recommended him to the Tiflis Seminary. Due to his impoverished circumstances, the seminary would provide Soso with the best, well-rounded education he could ever hope to achieve. Keke took him to the city, where they rented a room. Stalin applied for a scholarship to enable him to attend the school; they accepted him as a half-boarder, meaning that he was required to pay a reduced fee of 40 rubles a year. This was still a substantial sum for his mother, and he was likely financially assisted once more by family friends. He officially enrolled at the school in August 1894. He joined 600 trainee priests, who boarded in dormitories containing between twenty and thirty beds. Stalin was set apart by being three years older than most of the other first-year students, although a number of his fellow peers had also attended the Gori Church School. At Tiflis, Stalin was again an academically successful pupil, gaining high grades in his subjects. Completion of the seminary course required a variety of subjects, including Russian literature; secular history; mathematics; Latin; Greek; Church Slavonic singing, Georgian Imeretian singing; and Holy Scripture. As students progressed, they were taught more concentrated theological subjects such as ecclesiastical history, liturgy, homiletics, comparative theology, moral theology, practical pastoral work, didactics, and church singing. To supplement his income, he sang in a choir, with his father sometimes asking him for his earnings. During the holidays, he would return to Gori to spend time with his mother.

Tiflis was a multi-ethnic city in which Georgians were a minority. The Seminary was controlled by the Georgian Orthodox Church, which was part of the Russian Orthodox Church and subordinate to the ecclesiastical authorities in St. Petersburg. The priests employed to work there were largely reactionary, anti-semitic, Russian nationalists. They banned the speaking of Georgian by pupils, insisting that Russian be used at all times. Stalin was however proud to be Georgian. He continued writing poetry and took several of his poems to the office of the newspaper Iveria ("Georgia"). There, they were read by Ilia Chavchavadze, who liked them and ensured that five were published in the newspaper. Each was published under the pseudonym of "Soselo". Thematically, they dealt with topics like nature, land, and patriotism. According to Montefiore, they became "minor Georgian classics", and were included in various anthologies of Georgian poetry over the coming years. Montefiore was of the view that "their romantic imagery was derivative but their beauty lay in the delicacy and purity of rhythm and language". Similarly, Robert Service felt that in the original Georgian language these poems had "a linguistic purity recognised by all".

Over his years at the Seminary, Stalin lost interest in many of his studies and his grades began to drop. He grew his hair long in an act of rebellion against the school's rules. Seminary records contain complaints that he declared himself an atheist, chatted in class, was late for meals, and refused to doff his hat to monks. He was repeatedly confined to a cell for his rebellious behaviour. He had joined a forbidden book club, the Cheap Library, which was active at the school. Among the authors whom he read in this period were Émile Zola, Nikolay Nekrasov, Nikolai Gogol, Anton Chekhov, Leo Tolstoy, Mikhail Saltykov-Shchedrin, Friedrich Schiller, Guy de Maupassant, Honoré de Balzac, and William Makepeace Thackeray. Particularly influential was Nikolay Chernyshevsky's 1863 pro-revolutionary novel What Is To Be Done?. Another influential text was Alexander Kazbegi's The Patricide, with Stalin adopting the nickname "Koba" from that of the book's bandit protagonist. These works of fiction were supplemented with the writings of Plato and books on Russian and French history. The pseudonym "Koba" may also have been a tribute to his wealthy benefactor, Yakobi "Koba" Egnatashvili, who paid for his schooling at the Tiflis seminary. ("Koba" is the Georgian diminutive of Yakobi, or Jacob, and Stalin later named his first-born son in Egnatashvili's honour.)

He also read Capital, the 1867 book by German philosopher Karl Marx, and tried learning German so that he could read the works of Marx and his collaborator Friedrich Engels in the language in which they were originally written. He had soon devoted himself to Marxism, the socio-political theory that Marx and Engels had developed. Marxism provided him with a new way of interpreting the world. The ideology was on the rise in Georgia, one of various forms of socialism then developing in opposition to the governing Tsarist authorities. At night, he attended secret meetings of local workers, most of whom were ethnic Russians. He was introduced to Silibistro "Silva" Jibladze, the Marxist founder of Mesame Dasi ('Third Group'), a Georgian socialist group. One of his poems was published in the group's newspaper, Kvali. Stalin found many socialists active in the Russian Empire to be too moderate, but was attracted by the writings of a Marxist who used the pseudonym of "Tulin"; this was Vladimir Lenin. It is also possible that he had pursued romantic and sexual relationships with women in Tiflis. Years later, there was some suggestion that he might have fathered a girl named Praskovia "Pasha" Mikhailovskaya around this period.

In April 1899, Stalin left the seminary at the end of term and never returned, although the school encouraged him to come back. Through his years of attendance, he had effectively received a classical education without ultimately qualifying as a priest. In later years, he sought to glamourize his leaving, claiming that he had been expelled from the seminary for his revolutionary activities.

== Early revolutionary activity: 1899–1904 ==
Stalin next worked as a tutor for middle-class children, but earned a meager living. In October 1899, Stalin began work as a meteorologist at the Tiflis Meteorological Observatory, where his school-friend Vano Ketskhoveli was already employed. In this position, he worked during the night for a wage of twenty roubles a month. The position entailed little work and allowed him to read while on duty. According to Robert Service, this was Stalin's "only period of sustained employment until after the October Revolution". In the early weeks of 1900, Stalin was arrested and held in Metekhi Fortress. The official explanation given was that Beso had not paid his taxes and that Stalin was responsible for ensuring that they were paid, although it may be that this was a "cryptic warning" from the police, who were aware of Stalin's Marxist revolutionary activities. As soon as she learned of the arrest, Keke came to Tiflis, while some of Stalin's wealthier friends helped to pay the taxes and get him out of prison.

Stalin had attracted a group of radical young men around him, giving classes in socialist theory in a flat on Sololaki Street. Stalin was involved in organising a secret nocturnal mass meeting for May Day 1900, in which around 500 workers met in the hills outside the city. There, Stalin gave his first major public speech, in which he called for strike action, something that the Mesame Dasi opposed. Following his prompting, the workers at the railway depot and Adelkhanov's shoe factory went on strike. By this point, the Tsarist secret police—the Okhrana—were aware of Stalin's activities within Tiflis' revolutionary milieu. On the night of 21–22 March 1901, the Okhrana arrested several Marxist leaders in the city. Stalin himself escaped arrest; he was traveling toward the observatory aboard a tram when he recognised plain-clothes police around the building. He decided to remain on the tram and get off at a later stop. He did not return to the observatory, and henceforth lived off donations given by political sympathisers and friends.

Stalin next helped plan a large May Day demonstration for 1901, in which 3000 workers and leftists marched from Soldiers Bazaar to Yerevan Square. Demonstrators clashed with Cossack troops, resulting in 14 protesters being seriously wounded and 50 arrested. After this event, Stalin escaped several further attempts to arrest him. To evade detection, he slept in at least six different apartments and used the alias of "David". Soon after, one of Stalin's associates, Stepan Shaumian, organised the assassination of the railway boss director who resisted the strikers. In November 1901, Stalin attended a meeting of the Tiflis Committee of the Russian Social Democratic Labour Party, where he was elected one of the eight Committee members.

The Committee then sent Stalin to the port city of Batumi, where he arrived in November 1901. He identified an Okhrana infiltrator who was trying to gain access to the Batumi Marxist circles, and they were subsequently killed. According to Montefiore, this was "probably [Stalin's] first murder". In Batumi, Stalin moved around different flats, and it is likely that he had a relationship with Natasha Kirtava, whom he stayed with in Barskhana. Stalin's rhetoric proved divisive among the city's Marxists. His Batumi supporters became known as "Sosoists" while he was criticised by those regarded as "legals". Some of the "legals" suspected that Stalin might be an agent provocateur sent by the Tsarist authorities to infiltrate and discredit the movement.

=== employment in a storehouse and the Batumi massacre ===
In Batumi, Stalin gained employment at Rothschild refinery storehouse. On 4 January 1902, the warehouse where he worked was set alight. The company's workers helped to put out the blaze, and insisted that they be paid a bonus for doing so. When the company refused, Stalin called a strike. He encouraged revolutionary fervour among workers through a number of leaflets that he had printed in both Georgian and Armenian. On 17 February, the Rothschild company agreed to the strikers' demands, which included a 30% pay rise. On 23 February, they then dismissed 389 workers whom they regarded as troublemakers. In response to this latter act, Stalin called for another strike.

Many of the strike leaders were arrested by police. Stalin helped to organise a public demonstration outside the prison which was joined by much of the town. The demonstrators stormed the prison in an attempt to free the imprisoned strike leaders, but were fired upon by Cossack troops. 13 protesters were killed and 54 wounded. Stalin escaped with a wounded man. This event, known as the Batumi Massacre, gained national attention. Stalin then helped to organise a further demonstration for 12 March, the day on which the dead were buried. Around 7000 people took part in the march, which was heavily policed. By this point, the Okhrana had become aware of Stalin's significant role in the demonstrations. On 5 April, they arrested him at the house of one of his fellow revolutionaries.

=== Imprisonment: 1902–1904 ===
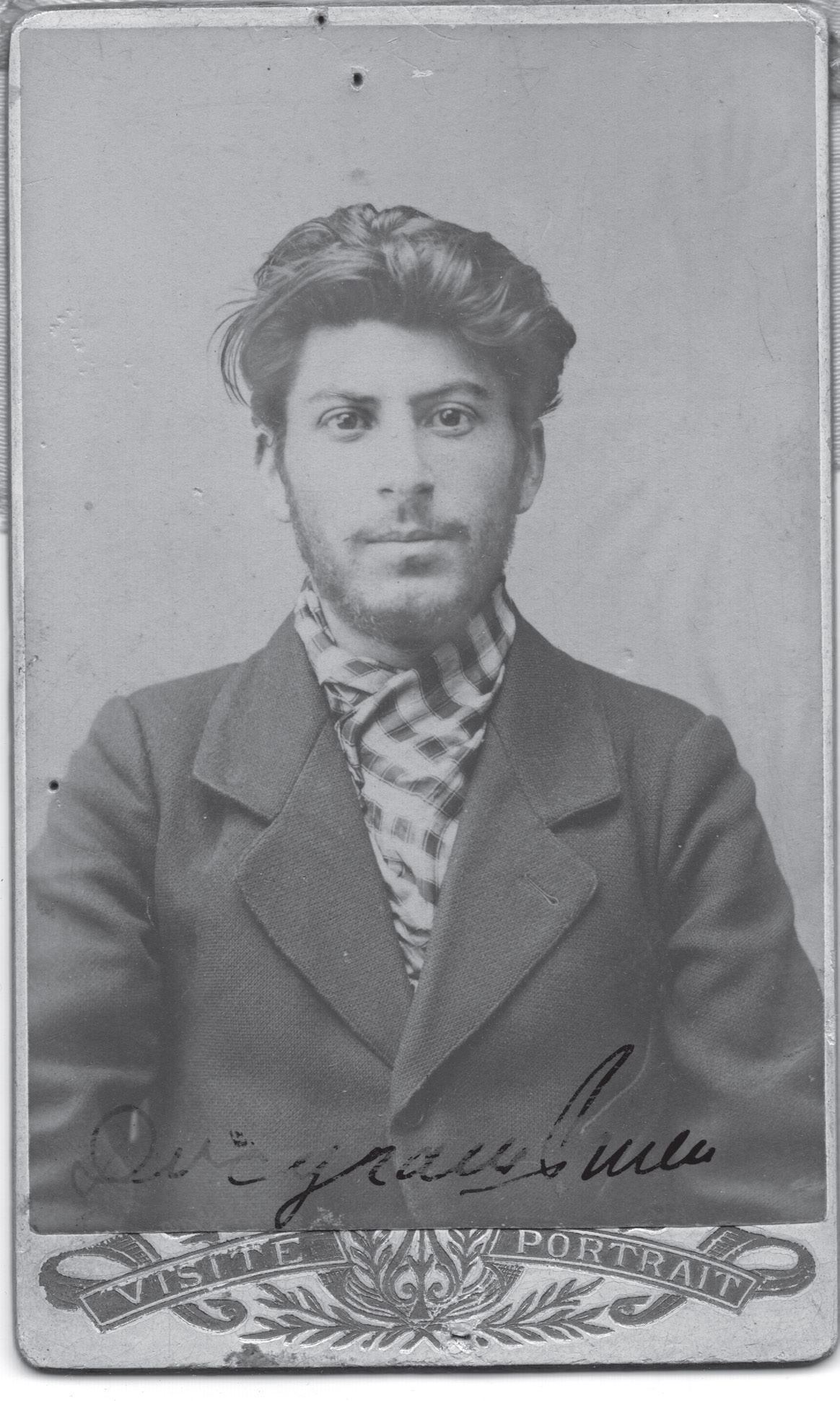
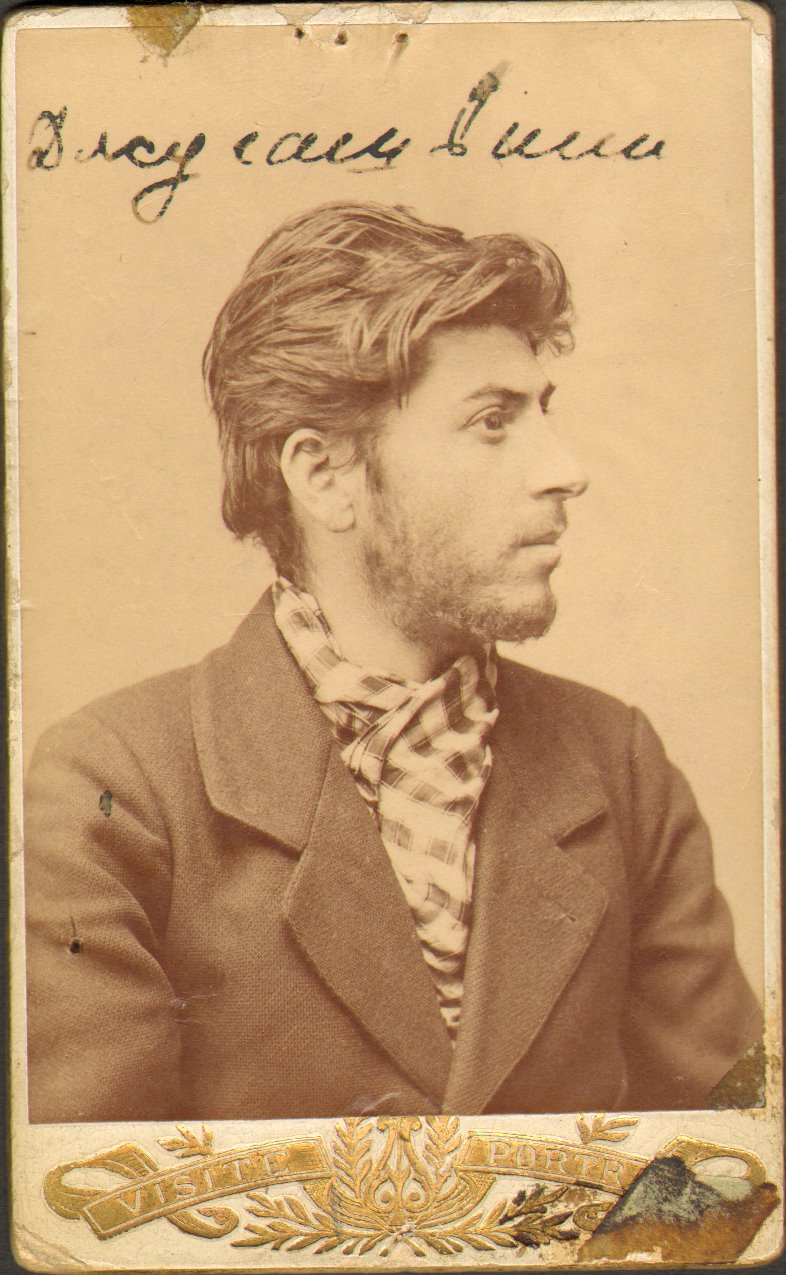
Police photographs of Stalin, taken in 1902 when he was 23 years old

Stalin was initially interned in Batumi Prison. He soon established himself as a powerful and respected figure within the prison, and retained contacts with the outside world. On two occasions his mother visited him. The state prosecutor subsequently ruled that there was insufficient evidence for Stalin being behind the Batumi disturbances, but he was instead indicted for his involvement in revolutionary activities in Tiflis. In April 1903, Stalin led a prison protest against the visit of the Exarch of the Georgian Church. As punishment, he was restricted to solitary confinement before being moved to the stricter Kutaisi Prison. There, he gave lectures and encouraged inmates to read revolutionary literature. He organised a protest to ensure that many of those imprisoned for political activities were housed together.

Stalin was exiled to Novaya Uda in Irkutsk province, eastern Siberia.

On 9 July 1903, the Justice Minister recommended that Stalin be sentenced to three years of exile in eastern Siberia. Stalin began his journey east in October, when he boarded a prison steamship at Batumi harbour and travelled via Novorossiysk and Rostov to Irkutsk. He then travelled, by foot and coach, to Novaya Uda, arriving at the small settlement on 26 November. In the town, Stalin lived in the two-room house of a local peasant, sleeping in the building's larder. There were many other exiled leftist intellectuals in the town but Stalin eschewed them and preferred drinking alcohol with the petty criminals that had been exiled there. While Stalin was in exile, a split had developed in the RSDLP, between the Bolsheviks who backed Lenin and the Mensheviks who backed Julius Martov.

Stalin had several attempts to escape Novaya Uda. On the first attempt he made it to Balagansk, but suffered from frostbite to his face and was forced to return. On the second attempt, he escaped Siberia and returned to Tiflis. It was while he was in the city that the Russo-Japanese War broke out. In Tiflis, Stalin again lived in the homes of various friends, and also attended a Marxist circle led by Lev Kamenev. A number of local Marxists called for Stalin's expulsion from the RSDLP because of his calls for the establishment of a separate Georgian Marxist movement. They saw this as a betrayal of Marxist internationalism and compared it to the views of the Jewish Bundists. Some referred to him as the "Georgian Bundist". Stalin was defended by the first Georgian Marxist to officially declare himself a Bolshevik, Mikha Tskhakaya, although the latter made the young man publicly renounce his views. He aligned himself with the Bolsheviks, growing to detest many of the Georgian Mensheviks. Menshevism was however the dominant revolutionary force in the Southern Caucasus, leaving the Bolsheviks as a minority. Stalin was able to establish a local Bolshevik stronghold in the mining town of Chiatura.

At workers' meetings around Georgia, Stalin frequently debated against the Mensheviks. He called for an opposition to inter-ethnic violence, an alliance between the proletariat and peasantry, and—in contrast to the Mensheviks—insisted that there could be no compromise with the middle-classes in the struggle to overthrow the Tsar. With Philip Makharadze, Stalin began editing a Georgian Marxist newspaper, Proletariatis Brdzola ("Proletarian Struggle"). He spent time in Batumi and Gori, before Tskhakaya sent him to Kutaisi to establish a Committee for the province of Imeretia and Mingrelia in July. On New Year's Eve 1904, Stalin lead a group of workers who disrupted a party being held by a bourgeois liberal group.

== The Revolution of 1905: 1905–1907 ==
In January 1905, a massacre of protesters took place in St Petersburg that came to be known as Bloody Sunday. Unrest soon spread across the Russian Empire in what came to be known as the Revolution of 1905. Along with Poland, Georgia was one of the regions particularly affected. In February, Stalin was in Baku when a spate of ethnic violence broke out between Armenians and Azeris; at least 2,000 were killed. Stalin founded the Outfit, an armed revolutionary squad that were involved with armed robberies, racketeering, assassinations, arms procurement and child couriering. According to Montefiore, Stalin socialised with hitmen “Kamo and Tsintsadze" but issued formal commands to the rest of the Outfit members through his bodyguard. Stalin also formed a Bolshevik Battle Squad which he ordered to try and keep the warring ethnic factions apart, also using the unrest to steal printing equipment. He proceeded to Tiflis, where he organised a demonstration of ethnic reconciliation. Amid the growing violence, Stalin formed his own armed Red Battle Squads, with the Mensheviks doing the same. These armed revolutionary groups disarmed local police and troops, and gained further weaponry by raiding government arsenals. They raised funds through a protection racket on large local businesses and mines. Stalin's militia launched attacks on the government's Cossack troops and Black Hundreds. After Cossacks opened fire on a student meeting, killing sixty of those assembled, Stalin retaliated in September by launching nine simultaneous attacks on the Cossacks. In October, Stalin's militia agreed to co-operate many of its attacks with the local Menshevik militia.

On 26 November 1905, the Georgian Bolsheviks elected Stalin and two others as their delegates to a Bolshevik conference due to be held in St. Petersburg. Using the alias of "Ivanovitch", Stalin set off by train in early December, and on arrival met with Lenin's wife Nadezhda Krupskaya, who informed them that the venue had been moved to Tampere in the Grand Duchy of Finland. It was at the conference that Stalin met Lenin for the first time. Although Stalin held Lenin in deep respect, he was vocal in his disagreement with Lenin's view that the Bolsheviks should field candidates for the forthcoming election to the State Duma.

In Stalin's absence, General Fyodor Griiazanov had crushed the Tiflis rebels. Stalin's Battle Squads had to go into hiding and operate from the underground. When Stalin returned to the city, he co-organised the assassination of Griiazanov with local Mensheviks. Stalin also established a small group which he called the Bolshevik Expropriators Club, although it would more widely be known as the Group or Outfit. Containing about ten members, three of whom were women, the group procured arms, facilitated prison escapes, raided banks, and executed traitors. They utilised protection rackets to further finance their activities. During 1906, they carried out a series of bank robberies and hold-ups of stage coaches transporting money. The money collected was then divided; much of it was sent to Lenin while the rest was used to finance Proletariatis Brdzola. Stalin had continued to edit this newspaper, and also contributed articles to it using the pseudonyms "Koba" and "Besoshvili".

In early April 1906, Stalin left Georgia to attend the RSDLP Fourth Congress in Stockholm. He travelled via St Petersburg and the Finnish port of Hangö. This would be the first time that he had left the Russian Empire. The ship on which Stalin travelled, the Oihonna, was shipwrecked; Stalin and the other passengers had to wait to be rescued. At the Congress, Stalin was one of 16 Georgians, but he was the only one who was a Bolshevik. There, the Mensheviks and Bolsheviks disagreed over the so-called "agrarian question". Both agreed that the land should be expropriated from the gentry, but whereas Lenin believed that it should be nationalised under state ownership, the Mensheviks called for it to be municipalised under the ownership of local districts. Stalin disagreed with both, arguing that peasants should be allowed to take control of the land themselves; in his view, this would strengthen the alliance between the peasantry and the proletariat. At the conference, the RSDLP—then led by its Menshevik majority—agreed that it would not raise funds using armed robbery. Lenin and Stalin disagreed with this decision. Stalin returned to Tiflis via Berlin, arriving home in June.

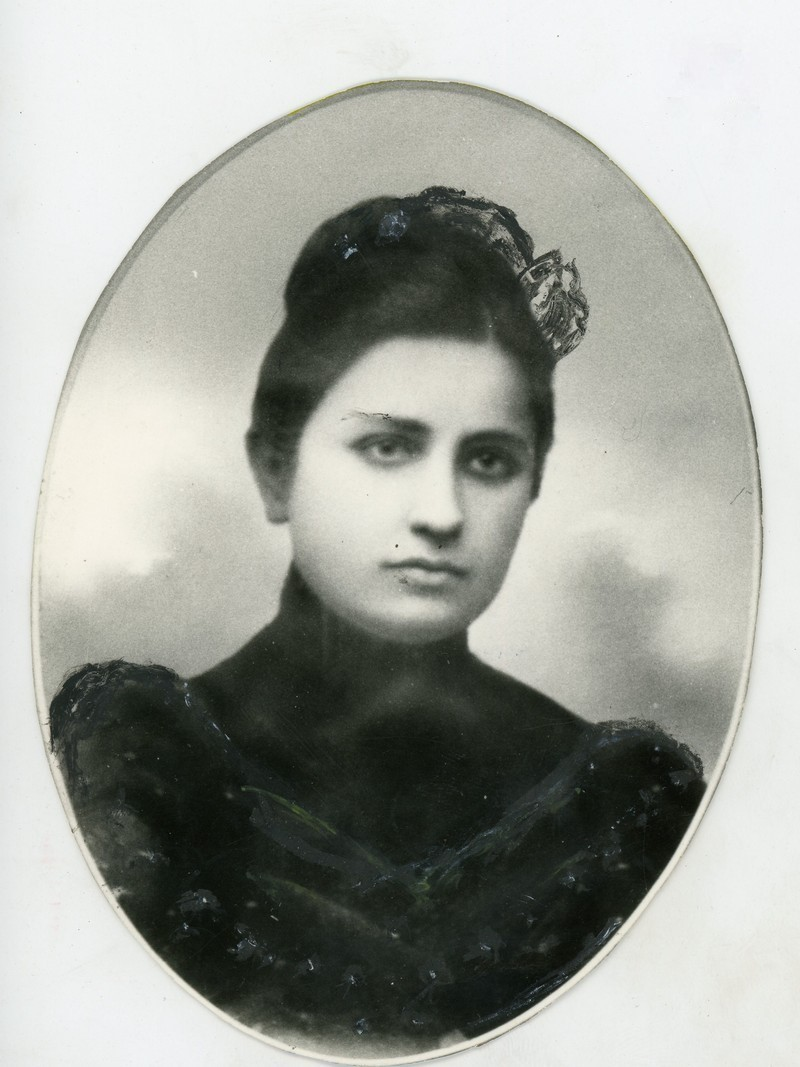
Ekaterina "Kato" Svanidze, Jughashvili's first wife

For some time, Stalin had been living in a central Tiflis apartment owned by the Alliluyev family. He and one of the members of this family, Kato Svanidze, gradually developed a romantic connection. They married in July 1906; despite his atheism, he agreed to her wish for a church wedding. The ceremony took place in a church at Tskhakaya on the night of 15–16 July. In September, Stalin then attended an RSDLP conference in Tiflis; of the 42 delegates, only 6 were Bolshevik, with Stalin openly expressing his contempt of the Mensheviks. On 20 September, his gang boarded the Tsarevich Giorgi steamship as it passed Cape Kodori and stole the money aboard. Stalin was possibly among those who carried out this operation. Svanidze was subsequently arrested for her revolutionary connections, and shortly after her release—on 18 March 1907—she gave birth to Stalin's son, Yakov. Stalin nicknamed his new-born son "Patsana".

By 1907—according to Robert Service—Stalin had established himself as "Georgia's leading Bolshevik". Stalin travelled to the Fifth RSDLP Congress, held in London in May–June 1907, via St Petersburg, Stockholm, and Copenhagen. While in Denmark, he made a detour to Berlin for a secret meeting with Lenin to discuss the robberies. Stalin arrived in England and Harwich and took the train to London. There, he rented a room in Stepney, part of the city's East End that housed a substantial Jewish émigré community from the Russian Empire. The congress took place at a church in Islington. He remained in London for about three weeks, helping to nurse Tskhahaya after the latter fell ill. He returned to Tiflis via Paris.

== Tiflis robbery: 1907–1909 ==
After returning to Tiflis, Stalin organized the robbing of a large delivery of money to the Imperial Bank on 26 June 1907. His squad ambushed the armed convoy in Yerevan Square with gunfire and homemade bombs. Around 40 people were killed, but all of Jughashvili's rebel squad managed to escape alive. It is possible that Stalin hired a number of Socialist Revolutionaries to help him in the heist. Around 250,000 roubles were stolen. Service described it as "their greatest coup". After the heist, Stalin took his wife and son away from Tiflis, settling in Baku. There, Mensheviks confronted Stalin about the robbery but he denied any involvement. These Mensheviks then voted to expel him from the RSDLP, but Stalin took no notice of them.

In Baku, he moved his family into a seafront house just outside the city. There, he edited two Bolshevik newspapers, Bakinsky Proletary and Gudok ("Whistle"). In August 1907, he travelled to Germany to attend the Seventh Congress of the Second International, which took place in Stuttgart. He had returned to Baku in September, where the city was undergoing another spate of ethnic violence. In the city, he helped to secure Bolshevik domination of the local RSDLP branch. While devoting himself to revolutionary activity, Stalin had been neglecting his wife and child. Kato fell ill with typhus, and so he took her back to Tiflis to be with her family. There, she died in his arms on 22 November 1907. Fearing that he would commit suicide, Stalin's friends confiscated his revolver. The funeral took place on 25 November at Kulubanskaya Church before her body was buried at St Nina's Church in Kukia. During the funeral, Stalin threw himself onto the coffin in grief; he then had to escape the churchyard when he saw Okhrana members approaching. He then left his son with his late wife's family in Tiflis.

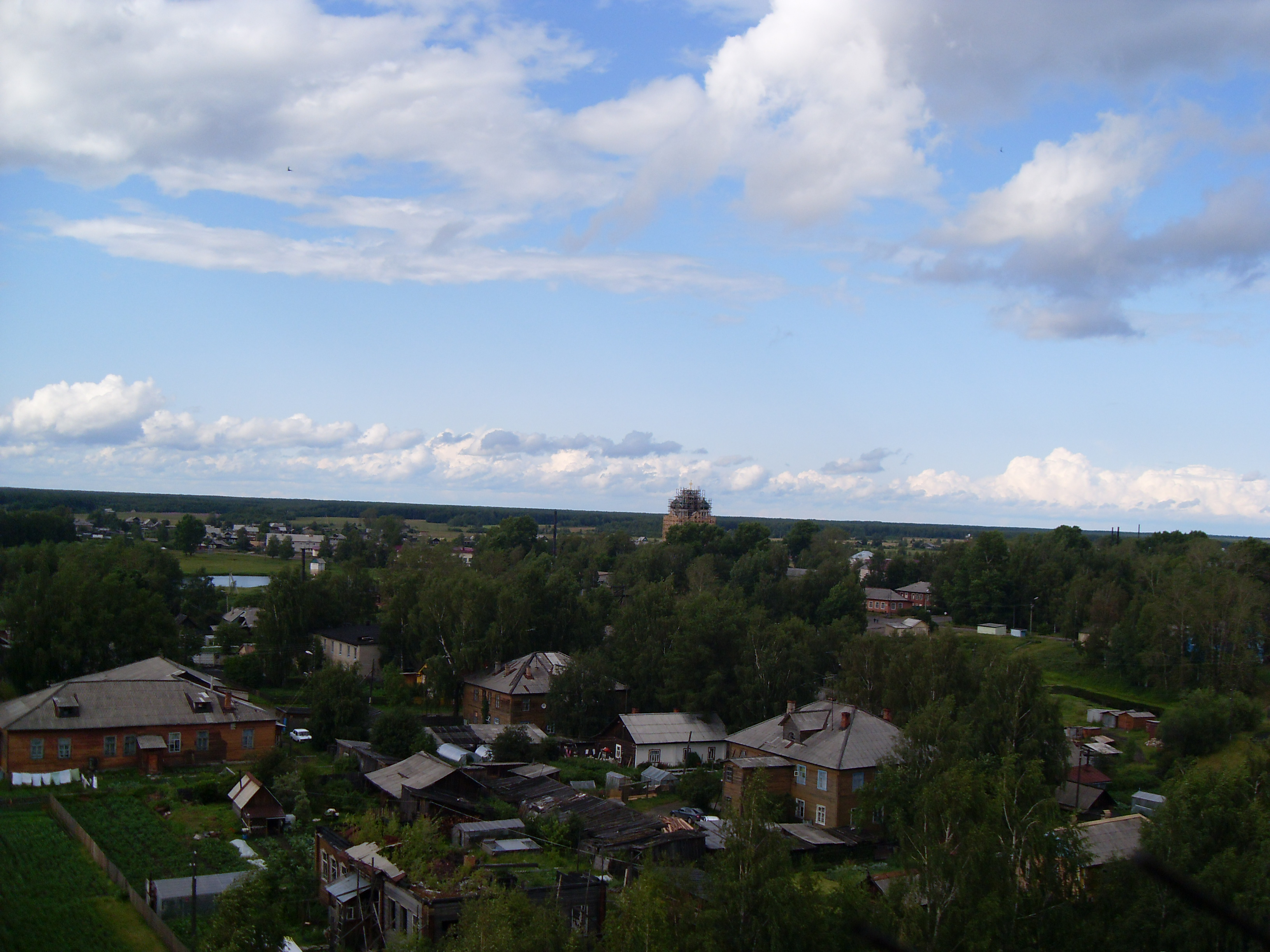
Stalin was exiled to the village of Solvychegodsk.

There, Stalin reassembled the Outfit and began publicly calling for more workers' strikes. The Outfit continued to attack Black Hundreds, and raised finances by running protection rackets, counterfeiting currency, and carrying out robberies. One of the robberies carried out in this period was of a ship, the Nicholas I, as it docked in Baku harbour. Not long after, the Outfit carried out a raid on Baku's naval arsenal, during which several guards were killed. They also kidnapped the children of several wealthy figures in order to extract ransom money. He also co-operated with Hummat, the Muslim Bolshevik group, and was involved in assisting the arming of the Persian Revolution against Shah Mohammad Ali Shah Qajar. At some point in 1908 he travelled to the Swiss city of Geneva to meet with Lenin; he also met the Russian Marxist Georgi Plekhanov, who exasperated him.

On 25 March 1908, Stalin was arrested in a police raid and interned in Bailov Prison. In prison, he studied Esperanto, then regarding it as the language of the future. Leading the Bolsheviks imprisoned there, he organised discussion groups and had those suspected of being police spies killed. He planned an escape attempt but it was later cancelled. He was eventually sentenced to two years exile in the village of Solvychegodsk, Vologda Province. The journey there took three months, over the course of which he contracted typhus, and spent time in both Moscow's Butyrki Prison and Vologda Prison. He finally arrived at the village in February 1909. There he stayed in a communal house with nine fellow exiles but repeatedly got into trouble with the local police chief; the latter locked Stalin up for reading revolutionary literature aloud and fined him for attending the theatre. While in the village, Stalin had an affair with an Odessan noblewoman and teacher, Stefania Petrovskaya. In June Stalin escaped the village and made it to Kotlas disguised as a woman. From there, he made it to St Petersburg, where he was hidden by supporters.

== Launching Pravda: 1909–1912 ==
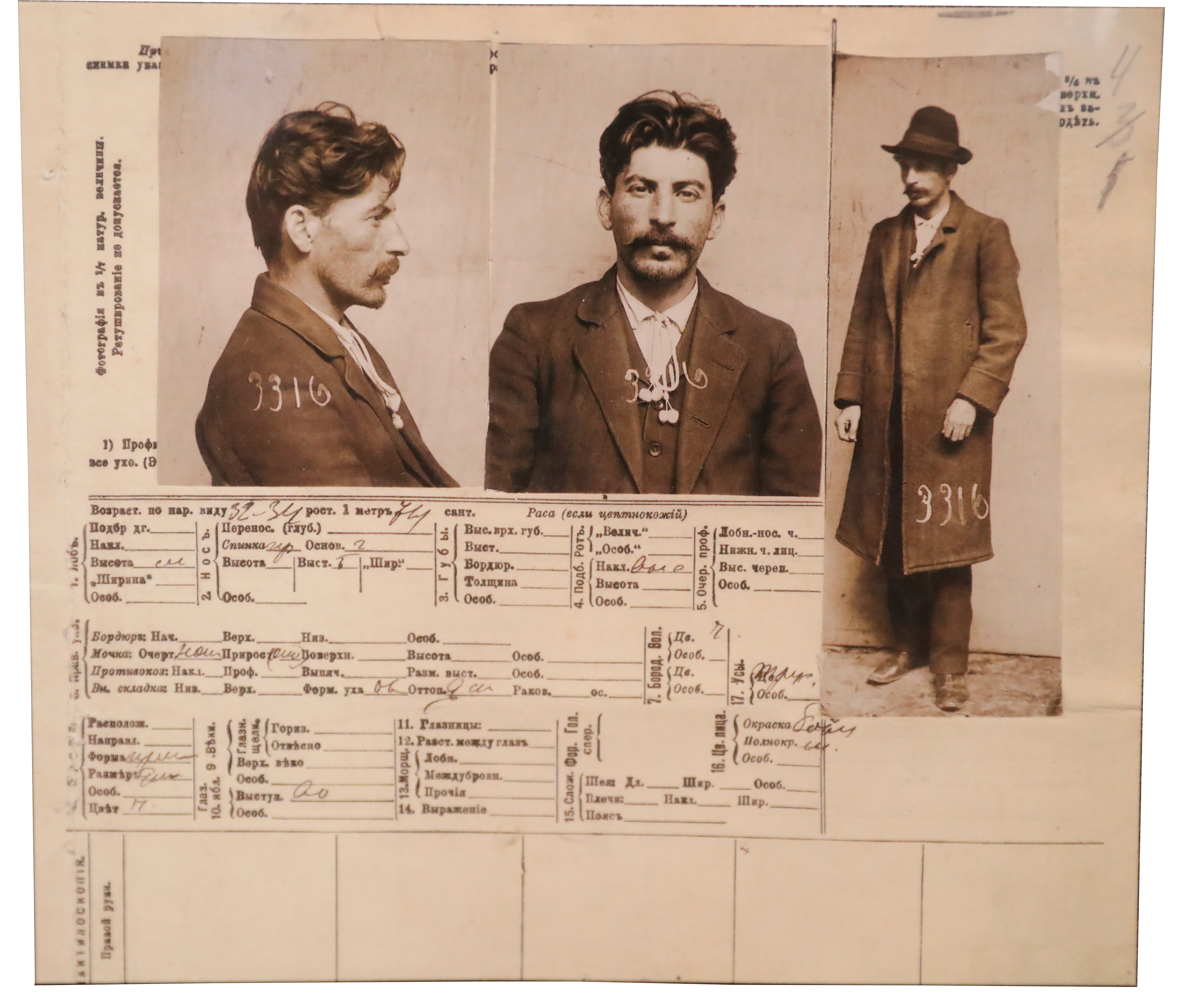
The information card on "I. V. Stalin", from the files of the Imperial police in Saint Petersburg, 1911

By July 1909, Stalin was back in Baku. There he began to express the need for the Bolsheviks to help boost their ailing fortunes by re-uniting with the Mensheviks. He was increasingly frustrated with Lenin's factionalist attitudes.

In October 1909, Stalin was arrested alongside several fellow Bolsheviks, but bribed the police officers into letting them escape. He was arrested again on 23 March 1910, this time with Petrovskaya. He was sentenced into internal exile and sent back to Solvychegodsk, being banned from returning to the southern Caucasus for five years. He had gained permission to marry Petrovskaya in the prison church, but he was deported on the same day—23 September 1910—that he received permission to do so. He would never see her again. In Solvychegodsk, he commenced a relationship with a teacher, Serafima Khoroshenina, and before February 1911 had registered as her cohabiting partner; she however was soon exiled to Nikolsk. He then entered into an affair with his landlady, Maria Kuzakova, with whom he fathered a son, Konstantin. He also spent time reading and planting pine trees.

Stalin was given permission to leave Solvychehodsk in June 1911. From there, he was required to stay in Vologda for two months, where he spent much of his time in the local library. There, he also had a relationship with the sixteen-year old Pelageya Onufrieva, who was already in an established relationship with the Bolshevik Peter Chizhikov. He then proceeded to St Petersburg, On 9 September 1911 he was again arrested, and held prisoner by the Okhrana for three weeks. He was then exiled to Vologda for three years. He was permitted to travel there on his own, but on the way hid from the authorities in St Petersburg for a while. He had hoped to attend a Prague Conference that Lenin was organising but did not have the funds. He then returned to Vologda, living in a house owned by a divorcee; it is likely that he had an affair with her.

At the Prague Conference, the first Bolshevik Central Committee was established; Lenin and Grigory Zinoviev subsequently proposed co-opting the absent Stalin onto the group. Lenin believed that Stalin would be useful in helping to secure support for the Bolsheviks from the Empire's minority ethnicities. According to Conquest, Lenin recognised Stalin as "a ruthless and dependable enforcer of the Bolsheviks' will". Stalin was then appointed to the Central Committee, and would remain on it for the rest of his life. On 29 February, Stalin then took the train to St Petersburg via Moscow. There, his assigned task was to convert the Bolshevik weekly newspaper, Zvezda ("Star") into a daily, Pravda ("Truth"). The new newspaper was launched in April 1912. Stalin served as its editor-in-chief, but did so secretly. He was assisted in the newspaper's production by Vyacheslav Scriabin. In the city, he stayed in the flat of Tatiana Slavatinskaya, with whom he had an affair.

== The Outfit's last heist and the national question: 1912–1913 ==
By May 1912, Stalin had returned to Tiflis. He then returned to St Petersburg via Moscow, and stayed with N. G. Poletaev, the Bolsheviks' Duma deputy. During that same month Stalin was arrested again and imprisoned in the Shpalerhy Prison; in July he was sentenced to three years exile in Siberia. On 12 July, he arrived in Tomsk, from which he took a steamship on the Ob River to Kolpashevo, from which he travelled to Narym, where he was required to remain. There, he shared a room with the fellow Bolshevik Yakov Sverdlov. After only two months, Stalin escaped via canoe and made it to Tomsk by September. There he waited for Sverdlov to follow him, and the two proceeded to St Petersburg, where they were hidden by supporters.

In Tiflis, the Outfit planned their last major operation. They attempted to ambush a mail coach, but were unsuccessful; after fleeing, eighteen of their members were apprehended and arrested. Stalin returned to St Petersburg, where he continued editing and writing articles for Pravda, moving from apartment to apartment. After the Duma elections of October 1912 resulted in six Bolsheviks and six Mensheviks being elected, Stalin began calling for reconciliation between the two Marxist factions in Pravda. Lenin criticised him for this opinion, with Stalin declining to publish forty-seven of the articles which Lenin sent to him. With Valentina Lobova, he travelled to Kraków, a culturally Polish part of the Austro-Hungarian Empire, to meet with Lenin. They continued to disagree on the issue of reunification with the Mensheviks. Stalin left and returned to St Petersburg but at Lenin's request he made a second trip to Kraków in December. Stalin and Lenin bonded on this latter visit, with the former eventually bowing to Lenin's views on reunification with the Mensheviks. On this trip, Stalin also made friends with Roman Malinovsky, a Bolshevik who was secretly an informer for the Okhrana.

In January 1913, Stalin travelled to Vienna, where he stayed with the wealthy Bolshevik sympathiser Alexander Troyanovsky. He was in the city at the same time as Adolf Hitler and Josip Broz Tito, although he likely did not meet either of them at the time. There, he devoted himself to examining the 'national question' of how the Bolsheviks should deal with the various national and ethnic minorities living in the Russian Empire. Lenin had wanted to attract these minorities to the Bolshevik cause and to offer them the right of secession from the Russian state; at the same time, he hoped that they would not take up this offer and would want to remain part of a future Bolshevik-governed Russia. Stalin had not been able to read German, but had been assisted in studying German texts by writers like Karl Kautsky and Otto Bauer by fellow Bolshevik Nikolai Bukharin. He finished the article, which was titled Marxism and the National Question. Lenin was very happy with it, and in a private letter to Maxim Gorky he referred to Stalin as the "wonderful Georgian". According to Montefiore, this was "Stalin's most famous work".

The article was published in March 1913 under the pseudonym of "K. Stalin", a name he had been using since 1912. This name derived from the Russian language word for steel (stal), and has been translated as "Man of Steel". It was—according to Service—an "unmistakably Russian name". Montefiore suggested that Stalin stuck with this name for the rest of his life because it had been used on the article which established his reputation within the Bolshevik movement.

== Final exile: 1913–1917 ==
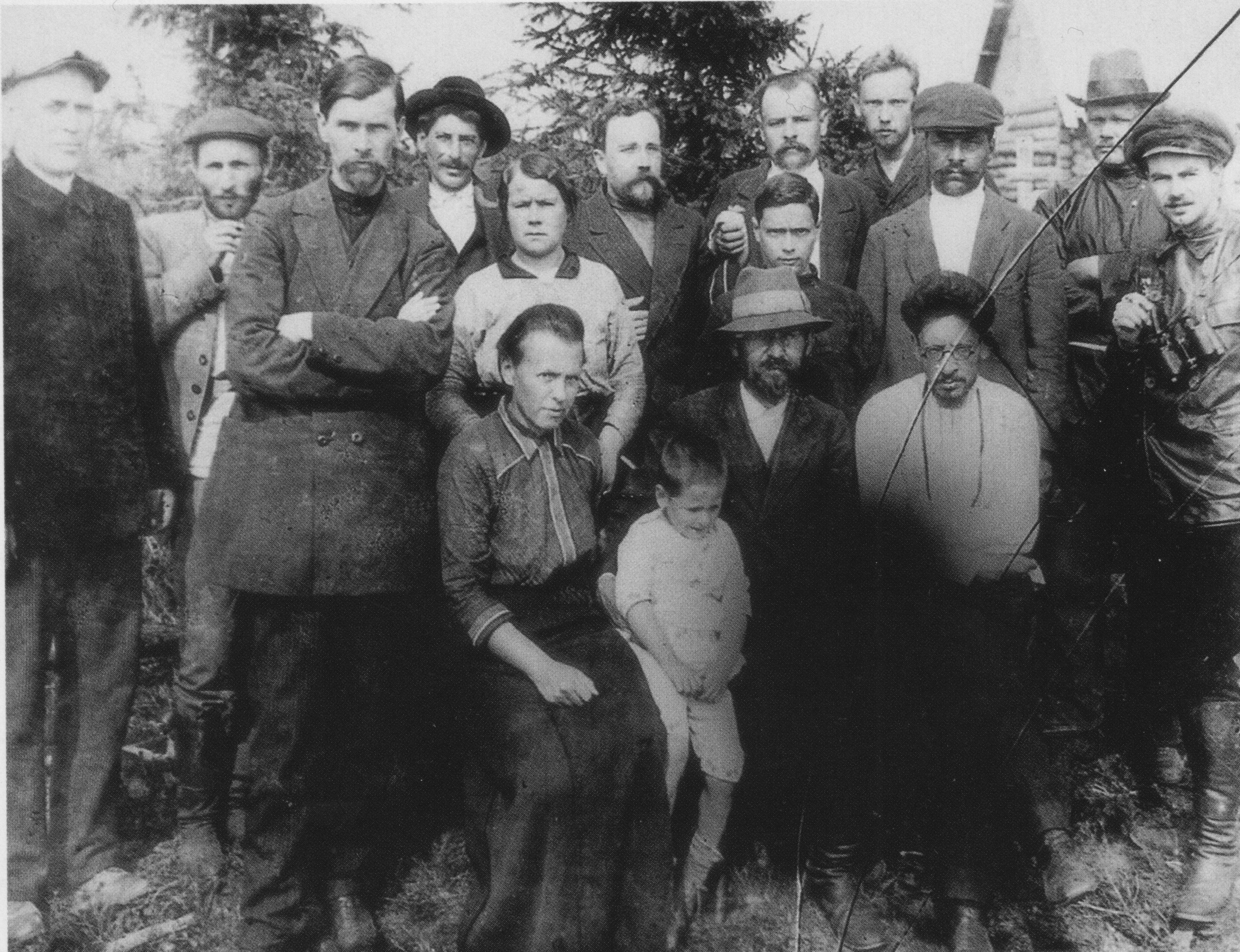
Stalin (back row, fourth from left) with other exiled Bolsheviks in the village of Monastyrskoye (Turukhansk), summer 1915

In February 1913, Stalin was back in St. Petersburg. At the time, the Okhrana were cracking down on the Bolsheviks by arresting leading members. Stalin himself was arrested at a masquerade ball held by the Bolsheviks as a fundraiser at the Kalashnikov Exchange.

Stalin was subsequently sentenced to four years exile in Turukhansk, a remote part of Siberia from which escape was particularly difficult. In August, he arrived in the village of Monastyrskoe, although after four weeks was relocated to the hamlet of Kostino. Stalin wrote letters to many people whom he knew, begging for them to send him money, in part to finance his escape attempt. The authorities were concerned about any escape attempt and thus moved Stalin, along with Sverdlov, to the hamlet of Kureika, on the edge of the Arctic Circle, in March 1914. There, the Bolshevik pair lived in the izba of the Taraseeva family, but frustrated one another as housemates. Stalin soon earned a reputation for self-centeredness among the locals when he simply seized the library of a deceased co-exile instead of sharing it in accordance to the "exiles' code".

According to several of his biographers, including Stephen Kotkin, Ronald Grigor Suny, Simon Sebag Montefiore, and Oleg V. Khlevniuk, Stalin had a relationship with Lidiya Pereprygina at Kureika. At the time, Stalin was aged c. 35, while Pereprygina was about 14 years old. They had two children, but only one survived. In regards to the sources for these stories, Kotkin mentioned local villager Anfisa Taraseyeva, and Lidiya Pereprygina herself. Conversely, Kotkin noted that parts of the evidence of the events relied on reports gathered by Ivan Serov which "contain[ed] obvious errors and reflect[ed] lazy police work". As per these tellings, Pereprygina gave birth to Stalin's child around December 1914, although the infant died soon after. As the incident became locally known, the police reportedly intervened and tried to force Stalin to promise to marry Lidiya; he ultimately reneged on the vow. In 1916, Lidiya – now 15 or 16 years old – was allegedly pregnant again. She gave birth to a son, named Alexander, in around April 1917, though Kotkin argued that Alexander's birth date was probably falsely recorded. Stalin, then absent, later came to know of the child's existence but showed no apparent interest in him. The child would come to be known as Alexander Davydov, after Lidiya's husband Yakov Davydov, who adopted Alexander. Within Pereprygina's family, stories were handed down about Alexander Davydov's origin, with Lidiya herself claiming that Stalin was the son's father. Decades later, Alexander's son Yury Davydov conducted a DNA test with a recognized grandson of Stalin, Alexander Burdonsky; the test reportedly confirmed that Yury Davydov was also a descendant of Stalin. In his later remembrances of his exile period, Stalin fondly recalled his dog of the time, but never mentioned Lidiya or his alleged illegitimate children.

Near the end of summer 1914, the authorities moved Stalin to Selivanikha, where he was visited by his close friend Suren Spandaryan. Here, he lived closely with the indigenous Tunguses and Ostyak communities, with whom he went on fishing trips. He spent lengthy periods on Polovinka island, where he constructed a one-man shelter and spent much time fishing in the adjacent Yenisei River.

While Stalin was in exile, Russia had entered the First World War, but was faring poorly against the German and Austro-Hungarian Empires. The Russian government began conscripting exiles into the Russian Army. In October 1916, Stalin and other exiled Bolsheviks were conscripted, leaving for Monastyrkoe. In December they set forth from there to Krasnoyarsk, arriving in February 1917. There, a medical examiner ruled him unfit for military service due to his crippled arm. This was convenient for Stalin as it meant that he would not be sent to fight on the Eastern Front, but also remained a source of embarrassment for him. Stalin was required to serve four more months on his exile, and he successfully requested that he be allowed to serve it in nearby Achinsk. There, he stayed in the apartment of fellow Bolshevik Vera Shveitzer.

== Between the February and October revolutions ==
Stalin was in Achinsk when the February Revolution took place; uprisings broke out in Petrograd—as St Petersburg had been renamed—and the Tsar abdicated, to be replaced by a Provisional Government. In March, Stalin travelled by train to Petrograd with Kamenev. There, Stalin and Kamenev expressed the view that they were willing to temporarily back the new administration and accept the continuation of Russian involvement in the First World War so long as it was purely defensive. This was in contrast to the view of Lenin—who was still in a self-imposed exile in Europe—that the Bolsheviks should oppose the Provisional Government and support an end to the war.

On 25 March 1917 (12 March, Old Style) Stalin returned from exile in Siberia to Petrograd with L. B. Kamenev, and M. K. Muranov. On 15 March, Stalin and Kamenev assumed control of Pravda, removing Vyacheslav Molotov from that position. Stalin was also appointed as the Bolshevik representative to the executive committee of the Petrograd Soviet. Lenin then returned to Russia, with Stalin meeting him on his arrival at Petrograd's Finland Station. In conversation, Lenin convinced Stalin to adopt his view on the Provisional Government and the ongoing war. On 29 April, Stalin came third in the Bolshevik elections for the party's Central Committee; Lenin came first and Zinoviev came second. This reflected his senior standing in the party at the time. Over the coming months he spent much of his time working on Pravda, at the Petrograd Soviet, or assisting Lenin on the Central Committee. He lived with Molotov in an apartment on Shirokaya Street where he and Molotov became friends.

Stalin was involved in planning an armed demonstration of the Bolsheviks' supporters. Although not explicitly encouraging those armed supporters who carried out the July Days uprising, he partially did so by informing its leaders that "you comrades know best". After the armed demonstration was suppressed, the Provisional Government initiated a crackdown on the Bolsheviks, raiding Pravda. During this raid, Stalin smuggled Lenin out of the newspaper's office and subsequently took charge of the Bolshevik leader's safety, moving him to five safe houses over the course of three days. Stalin then oversaw the smuggling of Lenin out of Petrograd to Razliv. He himself left the flat that he shared with Molotov and moved in with the Alliluyeva family. In Lenin's absence, he continued editing Pravda and served as acting leader of the Bolsheviks, overseeing the party's Sixth Congress, which was held covertly. At the Congress, Stalin was selected as the chief editor of all Bolshevik press and was appointed a member of the constituent assembly.

Lenin began calling for the Bolsheviks to seize power by toppling the Provisional Government in a coup. Stalin and Trotsky both endorsed Lenin's plan of action, but it was opposed by Kamenev and other Bolsheviks. Lenin returned to Petrograd and at a meeting of the Central Committee on 10 October, he secured a majority in favour of a coup. Kamenev nevertheless disagreed and wrote a letter warning against insurrection that Stalin agreed to publish in Rabochii Put. Trotsky censured Stalin for publishing it, with the latter responding with offering his resignation, which was not accepted. On 24 October, police raided the Bolshevik newspaper offices, smashing machinery and presses; Stalin managed to salvage some of this equipment in order to continue his activities. In the early hours of 25 October, Stalin joined Lenin in a Central Committee meeting in the Smolny Institute, from where the Bolshevik coup—the October Revolution—was being directed. Armed Bolshevik militia had seized Petrograd's electric power station, main post office, state bank, telephone exchange, and several bridges. A Bolshevik-controlled ship, the Aurora, sailed up to the Winter Palace, and opened fire, with the assembled delegates of the Provisional Government surrendering and being arrested by the Bolsheviks.

== Name and aliases ==
Stalin's birth-name in Georgian was Ioseb Besarionis dze Jughashvili (იოსებ ბესარიონის ძე ჯუღაშვილი). An ethnic Georgian, he also was a subject of the Russian Empire, so he also had a Russified version of his name: Iosif Vissarionovich Dzhugashvili (Иосиф Виссарионович Джугашвили).

Stalin's surname (ჯუღაშვილი) is transliterated as Jughashvili according to the official romanization system of the Georgian government. An alternative transliteration is J̌uḡašvili using ISO standard 9984:1996. His name was Russified to "Джугашвили", which is in turn transliterated into English as Dzhugashvili and Djugashvili. Besarionis dze means "son of Besarion," and was Russified to Vissarionovich ("son of Vissarion", the Russian version of "Besarion").

There are several etymologies of the jugha (ჯუღა) root. In one version, the name derives from the village of Jugaani in Kakhetia, eastern Georgia. In Georgian, the suffix -shvili means "child" or "son".

An article in the newspaper Pravda in 1988 claimed the word derives from the Old Georgian for "steel" - which might explain the adoption of the name "Stalin", since Сталин ("Stalin") is derived from combining the Russian сталь ("stal"), "steel", with the possessive suffix -ин ("-in"), a formula used by many other Bolsheviks, including Lenin.

The surname "Jughashvili" could possibly be of non-Georgian origin, since the various peoples of the Caucasus region had moved around for centuries. Throughout his life, Stalin often heard rumours that his paternal grandfather was ethnically Ossetian. Also his father described an Ossetian, the Y-DNA sample (newly uploaded) uploaded by his grandson is leaving by the Ossetian samples from 1100 years ago. However, like many other parts of Stalin's early life, his ancestry is often mixed up with facts and rumours. According to theories advanced by Mihail Vayskopf, it is the Ossetian for "herd of sheep"; the surname "Jugayev" is common among Ossetians, and before the revolution names in South Ossetia were traditionally written with the Georgian suffix, especially among Christianized Ossetians. Allusions to the hypothesis of Ossetian ethnicity of Stalin are present in the important Stalin Epigram by Osip Mandelstam:

...When he has an execution it's a special treat,

...And the Ossetian chest swells. (Translation by A. S. Kline)

Like many outlaws, Stalin used many aliases throughout his revolutionary career, of which "Stalin" was only the last. During his education in Tiflis, he picked up the nickname "Koba", after the Robin Hood-like protagonist from the 1883 novel The Patricide by Alexander Kazbegi. This became his favorite nickname throughout his revolutionary life. Stalin continued to use "Koba" as his Party name in the underground world of the RSDLP. During conversations, Lenin called Stalin "Koba". Among his friends he was sometimes known by his childhood nickname "Soso" – a Georgian diminutive form of the name "Ioseb". Stalin is also reported to have used at least a dozen other nicknames, pseudonyms and aliases such as "Josef Besoshvili"; "Ivanov"; "A. Ivanovich"; "Soselo" (a youthful nickname - Georgian სოსელო may mean "plain"), "K. Kato"; "G. Nizheradze"; "Chizhikov" or "Chizhnikov"; "Petrov"; "Vissarionovich" (his russified patronymic); "Vassilyi". Directly following World War II, as the Soviets were negotiating with the Allies, Stalin often sent directions to Molotov as "Druzhkov".

== Allegations of being an Okhrana agent ==
Stalin's apparent ease in escaping from Tsarist persecution and very light sentences led to rumours that he was an Okhrana agent. His efforts in 1909 to root out traitors caused much strife within the party; some accused him of doing this deliberately on the orders of the Okhrana. The Menshevik Razhden Arsenidze accused Stalin of betraying comrades he did not like to the Okhrana. The prominent Bolshevik Stepan Shaumian directly accused Stalin of being an Okhrana agent in 1916. According to his personal secretary Olga Shatunovskaya, these opinions were shared by Stanislav Kosior, Iona Yakir and other prominent Bolsheviks. The rumours were reinforced by being published in the Soviet Union memoirs of Domenty Vadachkory, who wrote that Stalin used an Okhrana badge (apparently stolen by him) to help him in his escape from the exile. It also appears suspicious that Stalin played down the number of his escapes from prisons and exiles. Still there was no hard evidence of Stalin's collaboration with the Okhrana and a few alleged reports from Stalin to the Okhrana published by the media appear to be forgeries.

Russian historian Roy Medvedev referenced a written statement from an Old Bolshevik, G. Borisov, alleging that Stalin had been an Okhrana agent:

"Stalin knew that if he was exposed and removed from power, he would be shot like Malinovsky. But it was precisely in 1935 that certain documents compromising Stalin came into the hands of some prominent Party and NKVD officials. However, Stalin managed to forestall their plans, and they themselves were shot. Everything suggests that Stalin, the former Okhrana agent, remained a monarchist at heart: his autocratic predilections, his brutal contempt for revolutionaries, his ignorance of Marxist and socialist doctrine”.

Medvedev however remained sceptical and argued that Borisov had not provided any supporting evidence for his claim.

Historian Simon Sebag Montefiore found that in all surviving Okhrana records Stalin is described as a revolutionary and never as a spy. Montefiore argued that Stalin escaped from his exiles so frequently because the exile system was not secure: an exile only needed money and false papers to escape the village where he was settled, and thousands did. Stalin also had spies of his own in the Okhrana, warning him of their actions. In 1956, the magazine Life published the Eremin Letter, supposedly written by Colonel Eremin, head of the Tiflis Okhrana, which stated that Stalin was an agent, but it has since been shown to be a forgery. In his 1967 biography of Stalin, Edward Ellis Smith argued that Stalin was an Okhrana agent by citing his suspicious ability to escape from Okhrana dragnets, travel unimpeded, and rabble-rouse full-time with no apparent source of income. One such example was the raid that occurred on the night of 3 April 1901, when nearly everyone of importance in the Socialist-Democratic movement in Tiflis was arrested, except for Stalin, who was apparently "enjoying the balmy spring air, and in one of his to-hell-with-the-revolution moods, [which] is too impossible for serious consideration." Montefiore, however, wrote that Stalin spotted Okhrana agents waiting for him outside his place of employment whilst he was riding a tram; he stayed on the tram and immediately went into hiding.

Service thought there are "no serious grounds" for deeming Stalin an Okhrana agent. Similarly, Robert Conquest was of the view that such claims "must be dismissed".

Conversely, historian Harold Shukman considered the notion that Stalin was an agent of the Tsarist Okhrana as a “controversial and complex question”. Shukman argued that most of the contents of Stalin's Okhrana file were later destroyed which he attributed to “Stalin’s orders" as an attempt to remove compromising material. He also referenced the extreme lengths that Stalin went to falsify his personal details and erase links with an unidentified, coded agent who shared the same birthday.

Historian Roman Brackman also shared this view as he described Stalin as having “inundated Soviet archives with fake documents in order to hide the record of his Okhrana service and to glorify his past as a revolutionary”.

Ronald Hingley regarded the issue as an “intriguing problem which may never receive its final solution” and argued this was partly due to the rewriting of history under the Stalinist regime. He also cited biographer Edward Ellis Smith who stated that most of the people who knew Stalin during his first thirty-seven years had been executed after being forced to sign falsified accounts. Smith himself considered it likely that Stalin was an Okhrana agent since 1899.

According to the transcribed recollections of Nikolay Vladimirovich Veselago, a former Okhrana officer and relative of the director of the Russian police department Stepan Petrovich Beletsky, both Malinovsky and Stalin reported on Lenin as well as on each other although Stalin was unaware that Malinovsky was also a penetration agent.

KGB archivist Vasili Mitrokhin claimed that during a visit to a secret section of the Moscow Main Archives Directorate, he had been shown an Okhrana file on Stalin. He found the contents to have “been entirely removed”. He suspected that “whatever emptied the file, presumably on Stalin’s instructions, was later eliminated to preserve the dark secrets of its missing contents”. Mitrokhin acknowledged that this was not conclusive proof but referenced supporting evidence from a report produced by an Okhrana agent which detailed accusations from Baku Bolsheviks that Stalin had been an agent of the secret police and embezzled party funds.

== Bibliography ==
- Conquest, Robert (1991), Stalin: Breaker of Nations, New York and London: Penguin, ISBN 978-0140169539
- Encyclopædia Britannica (2022). "Joseph Stalin: premier of Soviet Union". Encyclopædia Britannica.
- Khlevniuk, Oleg V. (2015). Stalin: New Biography of a Dictator. Yale University Press. ISBN 978-0-300-16388-9.
- Kotkin, Stephen (2014). Stalin: Paradoxes of Power, 1878-1928. New York: Penguin. ISBN 978-1594203794.
- Kotkin, Stephen (2017). Stalin: Waiting for Hitler, 1929–1941. New York: Penguin. ISBN 978-0-141-02795-1.
- Montefiore, Simon Sebag (2007). Young Stalin. London: Weidenfeld & Nicolson. ISBN 978-0-297-85068-7.
- Radzinsky, Edvard (1997), Stalin: The First In-depth Biography Based on Explosive New Documents from Russia's Secret Archives, Anchor, ISBN 978-0-385-47954-7
- Service, Robert (2004), Stalin: A Biography
- Suny, Ronald Grigor (2020). Stalin: Passage to Revolution. Princeton, NJ: Princeton University Press.
- Volkogonov, Dimitri (1991). Stalin: Triumph and Tragedy. Translated by Harold Shukman. London: Weidenfeld and Nicolson. ISBN 978-0297810803.
- Ziemke, Earl F (2004). The Red Army, 1918-1941: From Vanguard of World Revolution to America's Ally. Taylor & Francis. ISBN 9781135769185.
- Zubok, Vladislav M. (2007). A Failed Empire: The Soviet Union in the Cold War from Stalin to Gorbachev. University of North Carolina Press. ISBN 978-0-8078-9905-2.
