= Konstantin Kuzakov =

Soviet journalist-politician & Illegitimate son of Joseph Stalin

- Константин Кузаков
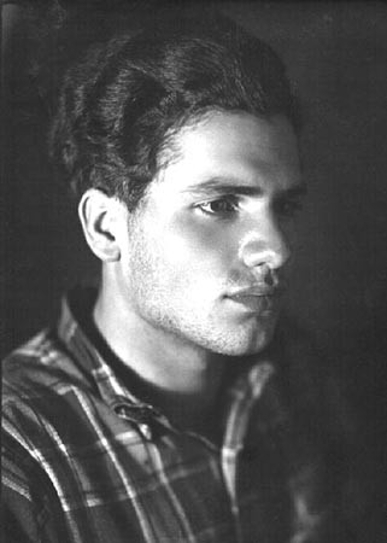
- Born: Konstantin Stepanovich Kuzakov; 4 September 1911; Solvychegodsk, Russian Empire
- Died: 12 September 1996 (aged 85); Moscow, Russia
- Education: Leningrad University
- Occupations: Journalist, Politician
- Political party: CPSU (1939–1987)
- Parents: Joseph Stalin (father); Maria Kuzakova (mother)
- Relatives: Yakov Dzhugashvili (half-brother); Alexander Davydov (half-brother); Vasily Stalin (half-brother); Svetlana Alliluyeva (half-sister); Artyom Sergeyev (adoptive brother)

Konstantin Stepanovich Kuzakov (Russian: Константин Степанович Кузаков; 4 September 1911 – 12 September 1996) was a Soviet journalist and politician and one of the organizers of Soviet television, radio, and cinema. He was claimed to be the illegitimate second son of Joseph Stalin.

== Biography ==
Kuzakov had publicly stated in 1995 that he was an illegitimate child of Joseph Stalin, though there is no given proof of this. Kuzakov alleged that his mother, Maria Kuzakova, had been Stalin's landlady and mistress during his 1911 exile in Solvychegodsk. One of Stalin's biographers, Simon Sebag Montefiore, supported Kuzakov's claims. According to Montefiore, Maria was still pregnant when Stalin left his exile.

Konstantin was enrolled into Leningrad University, according to Montefiore possibly with the discreet help of Stalin. According to Kuzakov the NKVD forced him to sign a statement promising never to reveal the truth of his parentage in 1932.

For a while, Kuzakov taught philosophy at the Leningrad Military Mechanical Institute. Afterward, he got a job in the Central Committee's apparat in Moscow. He served as a colonel during World War II. In 1948, while working for Andrei Zhdanov, a very close ally of Stalin, he and his deputy were accused of being American spies. While he was never officially introduced to the man he claimed was his father, Kuzakov alleged that on one occasion while working in the Kremlin "Stalin stopped and looked at me and I felt he wanted to tell me something. I wanted to rush to him, but something stopped me. He waved his pipe and moved on." Sebag-Montefiore claimed that although Stalin prevented Kuzakov's arrest, he was nonetheless dismissed from the Communist Party.

After Stalin's death and the arrest of Lavrentiy Beria, Kuzakov was restored in the Party and in Soviet apparat, holding various positions associated with culture, a member of the collegium of Gosteleradio, chief of a department in the Ministry of Culture and other posts. He died in 1996.
