= Lidiya Pereprygina =

Mother of an alleged illegitimate son of Joseph Stalin (1900–1965)

- Лидия Перепрыгина
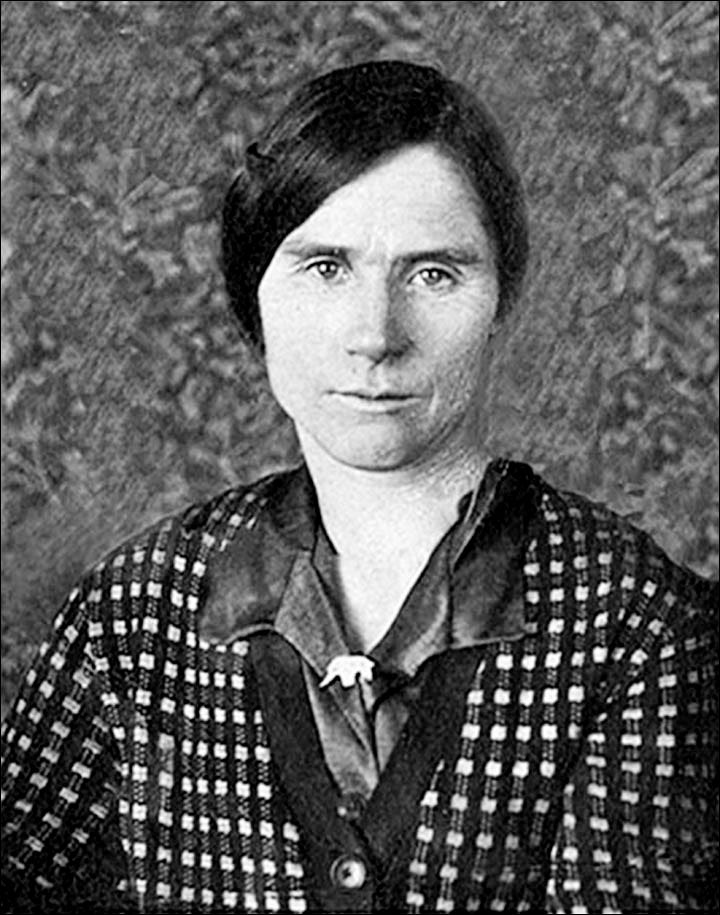
- Pereprygina sometime after WWII, c. 1945-1965
- Born: c. 1900 (Note: The exact year of birth is unknown; Lidiya Pereprygina is said to have been between 13 to 16 years old in 1914, depending on the source.)
- Died: 1964/1965
- Children: Alexander Davydov

Lidiya Platonovna Pereprygina (Russian: Лидия Платоновна Перепрыгина; c. 1900 – 1964/1965) was a Russian peasant and mother of Alexander Davydov, allegedly the illegitimate third son of Joseph Stalin. Stalin began living with Lidiya during his final exile in Siberia and allegedly impregnated her twice when she was 13–16 years old, but only the second child survived. Stalin was transferred elsewhere and later joined the February Revolution while Lidiya married a local and raised Davydov.

== Life ==
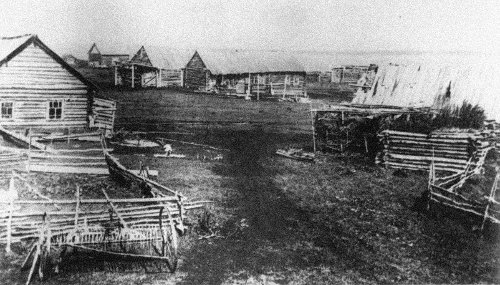
Village of Kureika in c. 1939, including the home of Lidiya Pereprygina

Born sometime in 1900, Lidiya Pereprygina grew up with a family of five brothers and two sisters, all orphans due to losing their parents at a young age. She was raised in the village of Kureika above the Arctic Circle, near Turukhansk in Krasnoyarsk Krai. Kureika was a hamlet consisting of only eight or ten wooden cottages, with the Perepryginas living in cramped and impoverished conditions, including a filthy floor, broken windows, and only two rooms.

In March 1914, exiled Joseph Stalin and his Bolshevik comrade Yakov Sverdlov were moved to Kureika, living together in an izba before Stalin moved out due to clashes between the two Bolsheviks. Stalin then rented a room from the Perepryginas. In Lidiya's unpublished memoirs, she remembers Stalin as a merry tenant, spending much of his time hunting and fishing with a native khanty named Martin Peterin and attending evening dances or other festivities, singing and dancing.

In 1914, Lidiya and 35-year-old Stalin began living in the same room together. Lidiya became pregnant and gave birth, but the child died soon after. In the village, relationships between the exiles and locals, both casual and long-term ones, were common, although Stalin and Pereprygina stood out given the age difference in the supposed relationship. The exact age of Lidia is not known, as accounts vary; in 1914, she was 13 to 16 years old.

According to Donald Rayfield, the local gendarme assigned to be Stalin's guard, Ivan Laletin, "caught Stalin in flagrante and had to fight off Koba’s fists with his saber". Stalin was then said to have promised to marry Lidia Pereprygina. However, accounts differ; German historian Ralph Ardnassak wrote that it was instead Lidia's brothers who caught Stalin and pressured him to promise to marry her. In contrast, Simon Montefiore wrote that Stalin was to promise that once the gendarme threatened a criminal case against him; while there was no legal concept of statutory rape in the Siberian law, there was a crime "against female honour", which such promise could have mitigated. Russian historian Geliy Kleymenov argues that Leletin had left Kureika in May 1914 and could not have been involved. Because of this, Oleg Khlevniuk cautions that the rumours and reports of the relationship are "muddled and contradictory".

Stalin was accused of having a relationship with a minor; however, the local police took Stalin's side and dismissed the case. The police commissioner of the Turuchansk region, Ivan I. Kibirov, replaced Laletin with M.A. Merzljakov, who treated Stalin "exceptionally well". Ardnassak claims that while Stalin was to be persecuted for 'sexual abuse of a minor', the case was dropped due to lack of evidence. Oleg Khlevniuk argues that Kibirov was possibly partial to Stalin, a Georgian, because he was an ethnic Ossetian.

According to Simon Sebag Montefiore, the "rumours of Stalin’s rape or seduction" of Pereprygina circulated for decades and were first documented by Essad Bey in his 1931 biography of Stalin. The story was then "repeated in biographies and sensational newspaper articles but seemed outlandish, presumably just anti-Stalin myth." However, Ivan Serov who assisted Nikita Khrushchev in his arrest of Lavrentiy Beria and the De-Stalinization campaign, sent a memorandum to Khrushchev on 18 July 1956 in which he claimed that the rumour was true. The memorandum was a part of Khrushchev's operation of gathering compromising material to damage Stalin's image. Geliy Kleymenov, a historian, argued that the memorandum was rife of inconsistencies and possible fabrications:

The KGB officers either compiled the report for Khrushchev in a hurry or deliberately introduced a host of serious falsifications in order to achieve the effect demanded by the leadership. Firstly, Stalin arrived in Kureika on 13–14 March 1914, and he could not have fathered a child with Perepryginova in 1913, nor could his child have been born in 1914, as he did not move in with the Pereprygin family until mid-May. Gendarme Leletin could not have been involved in this matter, as he left Kureika in May 1914; the claim that Stalin promised the gendarme he would marry her once she came of age is completely unfounded and constitutes a blatant fabrication. The certificate incorrectly lists Lydia’s surname as Perelygina; she, her brothers and her sister were all Pereprygins.

Stalin was ordered to leave Kureika in October 1916, was moved to Monastyrkoe several hundred kilometers away, and in December was transferred from there to Krasnoyarsk, arriving in February 1917. Lidiya gave birth to her second son, Alexander, in 1917. Stalin continued to send letters to Lidiya for some time but when rumor arrived that he had died she married the local peasant Yakov Semyonovich Davydov, who adopted Alexander.

Lidiya's son Alexander was drafted in August 1940, fighting in the Red Army against the Empire of Japan during the Soviet invasion of Manchuria in March-August 1945, earning the rank of major and the Order of the Red Star. According to Alexander's son Yuri, Stalin tried twice to bring Alexander to Moscow, but the two never met.

After marrying Yakov Davydov, Lidiya had eight more children. The family eventually moved one hundred miles north of Kureika to Igarka, where Lidiya became a hairdresser. She died around 1964 or 1965.

== Legacy ==
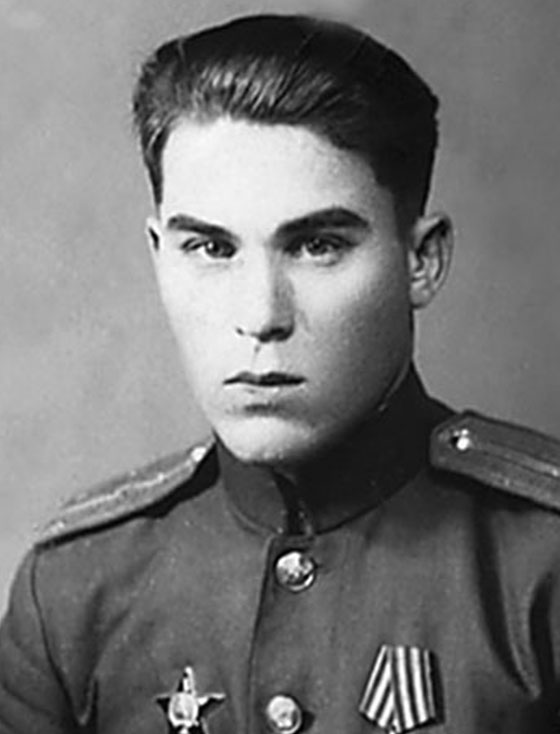
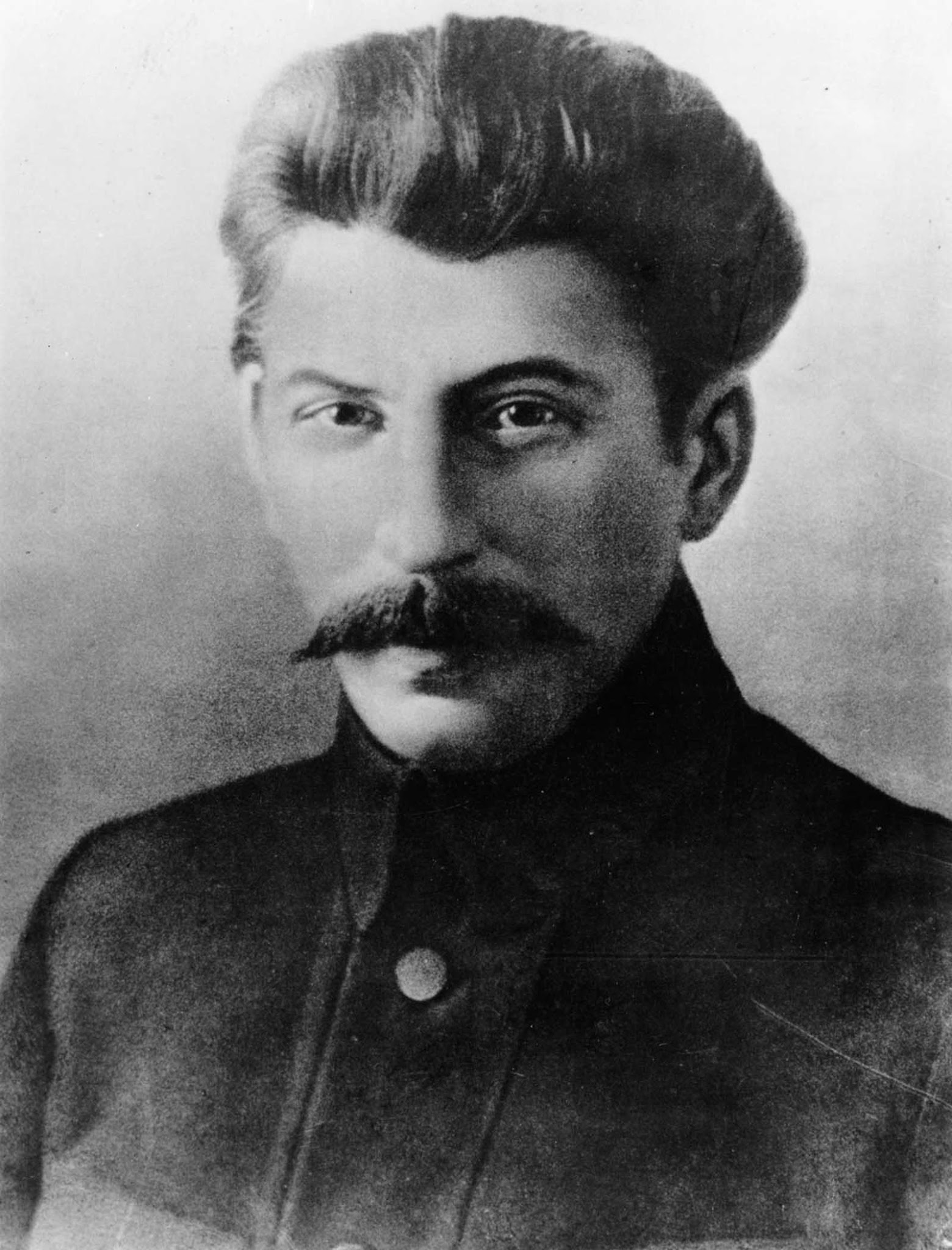
Alexander Davydov, c. 1940-1945, alongside Stalin, c. 1917, the same year as Alexander's birth

Svetlana Alliluyeva, Stalin's only daughter, was told that her father had a son with a Siberian peasant girl, writing in her book Only One Year (1969): "My aunts told me that during one of his periods of exile in Siberia he [Stalin] lived together with a local peasant woman and that their son now lives there somewhere, poorly educated and preferring anonymity." In the 1960s, Czech adventurers Hanzelka and Zikmund were to find testimonies on the Stalin-Lidiya relationship during their travels in Siberia, writing of them in their published travelogues.

Lidiya's son Alexander fathered two sons: Eduard and Yuri Davydov. NTV and The Siberian Times interviewed Yuri, who stated that in the early 1970s Alexander "invited [Yuri] to a room for a 'serious conversation'", in which Yuri was told that his grandfather was Joseph Stalin and further urged to keep it secret. Yuri said of his grandmother, Lidiya:

"My father's mother, Lidiya, told him about this many years after her affair with Stalin. I only saw my grandmother when I was little. She was thin and dark-skinned. She had dark hair and dark eyes, and was of medium height. They both kept it a secret."

Historian Ronald Grigor Suny, writing in Stalin: Passage to Revolution, stated that "whether Stalin was the actual father cannot be confirmed". Similarly, Oleg Khlevniuk wrote that "the rumours that they [Stalin and Pereprygina] had a son together have never been proven", and that the available reports of it are "muddled and contradictory".

In his 2018 biography of Stalin, Stalin: The Lord of Terror (German: Stalin: Der Herr des Terrors), German historian Helmut Altrichter expressed scepticism about the authenticity of the relationship. Stefan Creuzberger connected the allegations of Stalin's relationship with Pereprygina with the fact that Stalin was reported to enjoy his exile, stating "while a costly war raged in Europe, Stalin apparently enjoyed hunting, fishing, and roaming the taiga as much as the close and sometimes rough community with the ordinary local population, who were decidely not composed of political dissidents or intellectuals". Creuzberger found it "therefore hardly surprising that rumors circulated during this period about an affair with a minor".

Russian historian Vladimir Dolmatov, discussing the Serov memorandum, argued that "apart from these documents, there are no credible others attesting that Koba cohabited with Lydia Pereprygina. Neither oral nor written." Dolmatov contests Serov's claims:

If Serov is to be believed, their first child was born in 1913, but Dzhugashvili was sent to Kureika in 1914. Another matter is that criminal convicts in exile had lived there before him; might this be the result of their escapades? […] Molotov stated in conversations with Chuev that Khrushchev and Mikoyan had, at one point, gone so far as to want to fabricate documents discrediting Stalin. […] Perhaps the purpose of Serov’s memorandum was precisely to use the revelation of one fact – concerning the security services – to convince the reader of the veracity of another – regarding Stalin’s illegitimate children? That would explain why the memorandum bears no signature from the ‘client’ – Khrushchev.

In April 2016, during a Russia-1 TV show, Yuri Davydov had taken a DNA test showing that Stalin was Alexander's father, with a reported 99.98% accuracy. Alexander Burdonsky, Stalin's grandson through his son Vasily Stalin, provided the genetic material for the test. However, a subsequent DNA test taken few days later showed an accuracy of 85% instead. Ultimately, the TV show host stated that a more complex test is needed to establish kinship.

In 2026, magazine Rodina reported that a researcher Alexei Nilogov uncovered birth documents of Alexander Davydov from the archives of the Turukhansk Holy Trinity Monastery, according to which Davydov's birth date was 21 August rather than 6 November, as previously thought. Nilogov thus argued that Davydov could have been Stalin's son, arguing that Lidiya could have become pregnant in December 1916. However, according to historian Robert C. Tucker, Stalin had left Kureika in October 1916.
