= Kureika =

Kureika may refer to:

- Kureika River, a tributary of the Yenisei River, Russia
- Kureika Dam, a dam on the Kureika River
- Kureika Reservoir, a reservoir on the Kureika River
- Kureika (village), a village just north of the Arctic Circle near Turukhansk in Krasnoyarsk Krai, Russia
