= Alexander Davydov (soldier) =

Alleged son of Joseph Stalin (1917–1987)

- Александр Яковлевич Давыдов
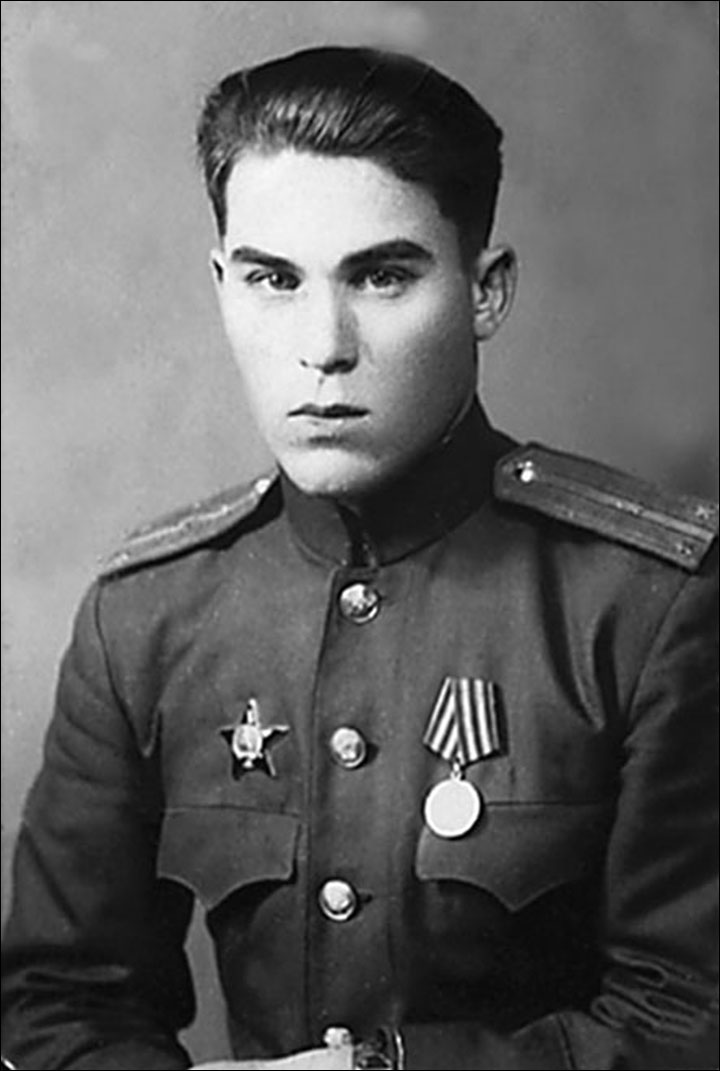
- Born: 6 November 1917; Kureika, Russian Republic
- Died: 1987 (aged 69–70); Soviet Union
- Children: 2
- Military career
- Allegiance: Soviet Union
- Service years: 1940–1945
- Rank: Major
- Conflicts: World War II; Invasion of Manchuria

Alexander Yakovlevich Davydov (Russian: Александр Яковлевич Давыдов; 6 November 1917 – 1987) was a Soviet Red Army major and allegedly the illegitimate third son of Joseph Stalin.

== Biography ==
=== Early life ===
Stalin resided in the Siberian village of Kureika during his exile. Here, he was accused of having an affair with Lidiya Platonovna Pereprygina, who was between 13 to 16 years old at the time. According to Donald Rayfield, the local gendarme assigned to be Stalin's guard, Ivan Laletin, "caught Stalin in flagrante and had to fight off Koba’s fists with his saber". Stalin was then said to have promised to marry Lidia Pereprygina.

However, accounts differ; German historian Ralph Ardnassak wrote that it was instead Lidia's brothers who caught Stalin and pressured him to promise to marry her. In contrast, Simon Montefiore wrote that Stalin was to promise that once the gendarme threatened a criminal case against him; while there was no legal concept of statutory rape in the Siberian law, there was a crime "against female honour", which such promise could have mitigated. Russian historian Geliy Kleymenov argues that Leletin had left Kureika in May 1914 and could not have been involved. Because of this, Oleg Khlevniuk cautions that the rumours and reports of the relationship are "muddled and contradictory".

Pereprygina allegedly became pregnant with Stalin's child. The child was born in December 1914, but died soon after. At the age of 16, Pereprygina became pregnant again and gave birth to Alexander on 21 August 1917. Stalin was transferred out of Kureika and left Siberia altogether before Alexander was born. Pereprygina later married Yakov Semyonovich Davydov, a peasant fisherman who adopted Alexander. Stalin knew of Davydov's existence and allegedly tried twice to bring him to Moscow. However, they never met.

=== World War II ===
Davydov was drafted into the Red Army in August 1940. He participated in the Manchurian Campaign against the Japanese between August and September 1945. He achieved the rank of major and the Order of the Red Star.

=== Later life ===
After his service in the Red Army, Davydov found work as a foreman for a construction site in Krasnoyarsk and married, with his wife working in the supply department of construction. Davydov fathered a son named Eduard and another son named Yuri around 1948–1949. According to Yuri, Davydov moved his family from Siberia to Novokuznetsk, where the Davydovs lived in a three-room apartment with another family. Davydov died in 1987.

In interviews with NTV and The Siberian Times, Yuri stated that in the early 1970s Davydov and his wife "invited [Yuri] to a room for a 'serious conversation'", in which Yuri was informed of their relation to Stalin, but advised his son to not speak of it due to the influence of Stalin's cult of personality.

In April 2016, during a Russia-1 TV show, Yuri Davydov had taken a DNA test showing that Stalin was Alexander's father, with a reported 99.98% accuracy. Alexander Burdonsky, Stalin's grandson through his son Vasily Stalin, provided the genetic material for the test. However, a subsequent DNA test taken few days later showed an accuracy of 85% instead. Ultimately, the TV show host stated that a more complex test is needed to establish kinship.

== Awards and honors ==
- Order of the Red Star
- Medal "For Battle Merit"
- Medal "For the Victory over Japan"

== Sources ==
- Montefiore, Simon Sebag (2007). Young Stalin. London: Weidenfeld & Nicolson. ISBN 978-0-297-85068-7.
