= Eremin letter =

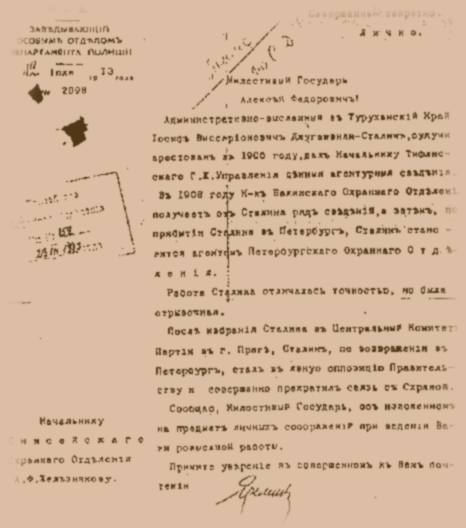
The alleged original letter

The Eremin letter was a letter allegedly written by Colonel A. M. Eryomin (А. М. Ерёмин), a high-ranking member of the Okhrana, the secret police of the Russian Empire.

== Contents ==
The letter said that Joseph Stalin after being administratively exiled to the Turukhansky District, because of having been arrested in 1906, gave valuable intelligence information to the head of the Tiflis Provincial Directorate. In 1908, the head of the Baku Security Department received a number of information from Stalin, and then, upon Stalin’s arrival in St. Petersburg, Stalin became an agent of the St. Petersburg Security Department, and started providing information to the Tsar's police. It also said that when Stalin was elected to the Central committee of the Bolshevik party in 1910, he completely ceased to cooperate with the Okhrana. The claim that Stalin worked for the Okhrana has been made multiple times, but the Eremin letter is the only document that corroborates it. The wider subject of his alleged collaboration with the Okhrana police still remains a debated issue among historians.

== Orlov's Life Magazine article ==
In April 1956, Soviet defector Alexander Orlov published an article in Life Magazine, "The Sensational Secret Behind the Damnation of Stalin", accompanied by a commentary by Isaac Don Levine. According to Orlov, the reason Stalin had purged Marshal Tukhachevsky and other members of the Soviet military was because they discovered some documents which showed that Stalin had been a member of the Okhrana that infiltrated the Bolshevik movement. The first appearance of the letter was in this article, which later appeared in various other works, such as in Stalin's Great Secret by Isaac Don Levine. The magazine also published Levine's article documenting the history of the appearance of the letter.

== Authenticity ==
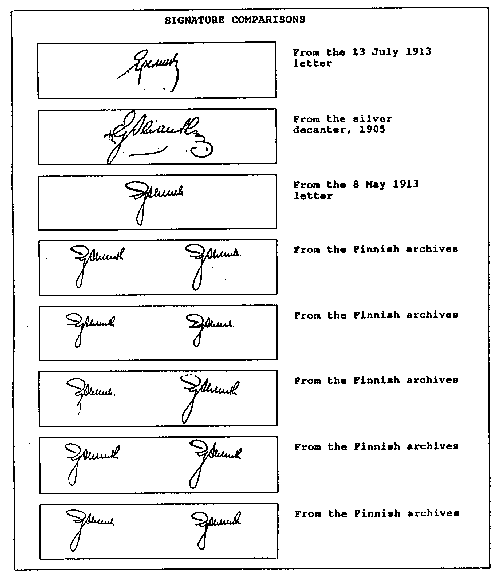
From top to bottom: “Eremin’s signature” under a false document, a signature engraved on a silver jug, Eremin’s signature on a letter dated May 8, 1913, Eremin’s signatures on documents from the Finnish archives.

Even among emigrants with anti-Soviet attitude, this “document” caused a sceptical reaction:

“And finally, one cannot ignore the noisy publication in the New York magazine Life (issue dated April 23) of a false document attempting to prove that Stalin was an agent of the Okhrana under tsarism. This pseudo-document was presented four years ago to B. Souvarine who immediately and categorically declared it a fake."

Many historians believe that the letter is most likely a forgery.

A researcher at the State Archives of the Russian Federation (GARF) Zinaida Peregudova writes about the authenticity of Eremin’s “letter” :

The letter is dated July 12, 1913, but Colonel Eremin at that time was no longer the head of the Special Department of the Police Department, since on June 11, 1913 he was appointed head of the Finnish Gendarmerie Department. Consequently, he could not sign the letter as the head of the Special Department.

GARF has many documents signed by Eremin, which is very characteristic. A graphological examination clearly established that the signature under “Eremin’s letter” does not belong to Eremin.

Stephen Kotkin, an acclaimed biographer of Stalin, said that it was normal for the Okhrana to cast doubts over genuine revolutionaries, by saying they were police agents. Both Leon Trotsky and Stalin came under suspicion of police collaboration. Those rumours always followed Stalin, but they were accusations his enemies failed to prove. Kotkin remarked that in a certain occasion, one former Okhrana chief boasted, triumphant, that the revolutionaries started to suspect each other, so that in the end none of them could trust each other.

== See also ==
- Early life of Joseph Stalin
