= Artyom Sergeyev =

Joseph Stalin's adopted son (1921–2008)

- Apтём Фёдорович Сергеев
- Born: 5 March 1921; Moscow, Russian SFSR
- Died: 15 January 2008 (aged 86); Moscow, Russia
- Burial place: Kuntsevo Cemetery, Moscow
- Spouses: Amaya Ruiz Ibárruri (divorced): Elena Yurievna Sergeeva
- Relatives: Fyodor Sergeyev (biological father); Yelizaveta Sergeyeva (biological mother); Joseph Stalin (adoptive father); Nadezhda Alliluyeva (adoptive mother); Yakov Dzhugashvili (older brother); Vasily Stalin (younger brother); Svetlana Alliluyeva (younger sister)
- Military career
- Allegiance: Soviet Union
- Service years: 1938–1981
- Rank: Major General
- Conflicts: World War II
- Awards: Order of the Red Banner (3); Order of the Red Star (2); Order of the Patriotic War (2); Order of Alexander Nevsky

Artyom Fyodorovich Sergeyev (Russian: Артём Фёдорович Сергеев; 5 March 1921 – 15 January 2008) was the adopted son of Joseph Stalin. He became a major general in the Soviet military.

Sergeyev's biological father, Fyodor Sergeyev, a close friend of Stalin, died in an Aerowagon train derailment in 1921. Vladimir Lenin initiated the following adoption by Stalin. His military service began in 1938 at the age of 17 and he was active in fighting against German troops in World War II. He was appointed lieutenant colonel at the age of 23 and continued serving in the military after the war. In 1960, Sergeyev was given charge of air defences surrounding weapons factories in Dnepropetrosk. By the time of death, he was highly awarded with orders and medals, and was thrice Cavalier of the Order of the Red Banner, Order of Alexander Nevsky, twice Order of the Patriotic War, twice Order of the Red Star.

He wrote two books about war and Stalin. His first wife was Amaya Ruiz Ibárruri, the daughter of Spanish Communist politician Dolores Ibárruri. Sergeyev died in 2008. He is buried at Kuntsevo Cemetery in Moscow.

== Early life ==
Sergeyev was born on 5 March 1921. His father, Fyodor Sergeyev, had been a Bolshevik and trade union leader who was jailed numerous times by the Tsarist government where he met with future leader of the Soviet Union, Vladimir Lenin, before being exiled to Siberia. He escaped and immigrated to Australia in 1911, returning to Russia after the October Revolution in 1917. As Lenin's health deteriorated, Fyodor became a close ally of Stalin in his ideological struggle against Leon Trotsky. A few months after his son Artyom was born, Fyodor was killed on 24 July 1921 during a test run of a locomotive powered by an aircraft engine when it was derailed by stones placed on the tracks. Trotskyist supporters were suspected of being responsible for the derailment.

Stalin was entrusted by Lenin to look after Fyodor's widow, Yelizaveta Sergeyeva, and to raise Sergeyev - whom he adopted - as a communist. Within the Stalin family, Sergeyev became friends with Stalin's youngest biological son Vasily who was only a few days younger. In Sergeyev's recount of his childhood, he described how Stalin "was quite harsh with [Vasily] at times when he had problems at school" and would use Sergeyev or his daughter Svetlana as an example for how he should be. Sergeyev portrayed Stalin in his writings as having a bookish and avuncular character who ensured he had enough knowledge of Russian literature. Up to his death, he remained an admirer of Stalin and kept many of his gifts.

== Military service ==
In his writings, Sergeyev wrote that "it was not in any way a privilege to be close to Stalin's family. We all knew there would be war soon, and Stalin wanted us to prepare to defend our country. Most of the children of [Communist Party] leaders either joined the army or went to work in the defence industry." In 1938, at the age of 17, he began his military career in the artillery. Two months after the beginning of German-led invasion of the Soviet Union (Operation Barbarossa) in June 1941, Sergeyev commanded a partisan group behind German lines. He later fought in the Battles of Moscow and Stalingrad. At the age of 23, he was made a lieutenant colonel.

Throughout the entire war, Sergeyev suffered numerous injuries. He evaded capture twice and was bayonetted in his liver. Sergeyev was also awarded multiple medals, including the Order of Alexander Nevsky which he was the most proud of.

After the Second World War, Sergeyev became a Major General. In 1960, he was made the commander of Soviet air defences around Dnepropetrovsk in eastern Ukraine. The factories of Dnepropetrovsk were, at the time, manufacturing long-range nuclear missiles.

== Personal life and death ==
Sergeyev died on 15 January 2008 at the age of 86 in a dacha located in the outskirts of Moscow. Before he had died, a group of war veterans brought him a medal commemorating Stalin they pinned onto him. His last words were "I serve the Soviet Union". Sergeyev had two sons and a daughter.
