= Alexander Burdonsky =

Russian theatre director (1941–2017)

- Born: Alexander Vasilyevich Stalin; October 14, 1941; Kuybyshev, Russian SFSR, Soviet Union
- Died: May 23, 2017 (aged 75); Moscow, Russia
- Education: Russian Academy of Theatre Arts
- Occupation: Theatre director
- Years active: 1972−2017
- Employer: Russian Army Theatre
- Spouse: Dalia Tamulevičiūtė
- Parents: Vasily Stalin (father); Galina Burdonskaia (mother)
- Relatives: Joseph Stalin (grandfather)
- Awards: People's Artist of Russia (1996)

Alexander Vasilyevich Burdonsky (Russian: Александр Васильевич Бурдонский; October 14, 1941 – May 23, 2017) was a Russian theater and film director and grandson of Soviet leader Joseph Stalin. He directed more than 20 plays at The Moscow Theater, and also directed films including Playing On the Keys of The Soul and This Madman Platanov. In 1996, Burdonsky was awarded the People's Artist of Russia for his works.

== Early life & education ==
Burdonsky was born on October 14, 1941, in Kuybyshev (now Samara), during evacuation, to Vasily Stalin and Galina Burdonskaia. At birth, he was given the surname Stalin, but during his school and college years, he used the surname Vasiliev. In adulthood, he adopted his mother's surname, Burdonsky.

Four years after his birth, Burdonskaya left Vasily due to his lifestyle and habits such alcohol abuse, infidelity, and frequent scandals. After the separation, Vasily Stalin prevented Galina from seeing Alexander and his younger sister Nadezhda. The children returned to their mother only after Stalin’s death.

== Theater career ==
In 1951, at his father’s insistence, Burdonsky was enrolled in the Kalinin Suvorov Military School, where he studied for two years. After completing seventh grade in 1955, he entered the Theatrical Art and Technical School to study stage design, while also participating in amateur performances at the Pioneer House on Tikhvin Lane.

After graduating from the school in 1958, Burdonsky worked as a props artist in various Moscow theaters. In 1966, he enrolled at GITIS (Russian Institute of Theatre Arts) in the directing department, studying under Maria Knebel. Burdonsky was also accepted into the acting studio of the Sovremennik Theatre under Oleg Yefremov.

Upon graduating from GITIS in 1971, Burdonsky was invited by Anatoly Efros to play the role of Romeo in a Shakespeare production at the Malaya Bronnaya Theatre. Three months later, Knebel invited him to the Central Theatre of the Soviet Army to direct the play He Who Gets Slapped by Leonid Andreyev, featuring Andrei Popov and Vladimir Zeldin. After the production premiered in 1972, the theatre’s artistic director, Andrei Popov, offered Burdonsky a permanent position there.

== Personal life ==
Burdonsky was married to his classmate, Dalia Tamulevičiūtė (1940–2006), a Lithuanian theatre director, Honored Worker of the Arts Industry of the Lithuanian SSR, and the chief director of the Lithuanian Youth Theatre who died in 2006. The couple had no children.

Burdonsky died of cancer on May 23, 2017, at the age of 75.
