= Vasily Stalin =

Son of Joseph Stalin (1921–1962)

- Василий Иосифович Сталин
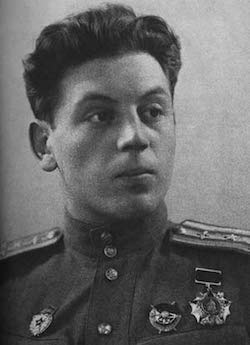
- Vasily in 1943
- Born: 21 March 1921; Moscow, Russia
- Died: 19 March 1962 (aged 40); Kazan, Tatar ASSR, Soviet Union
- Spouses: Galina Burdonskaya; Yekaterina Timoshenko; Kapitolina Vasilyeva; Mariya Nusberg
- Children: Alexander Burdonsky
- Relatives: Joseph Stalin (father); Nadezhda Alliluyeva (mother); Svetlana Alliluyeva (sister); Yakov Dzhugashvili (half-brother); Artyom Sergeyev (adoptive brother)
- Military career
- Allegiance: Soviet Union
- Branch: Soviet Air Forces
- Service years: 1938–1953
- Rank: Lieutenant General
- Units: 1st Baltic Front; 1st Belorussian Front
- Commands: Air Forces of the Moscow Military District
- Conflicts: World War II; Operation Barbarossa; Battle of Berlin
- Awards: Order of the Red Banner (2); Order of Alexander Nevsky; Order of Suvorov

Vasily Iosifovich Stalin (Note: In this name that follows East Slavic naming customs, the patronymic is Iosifovich and the family name is Stalin.) (Note: Russian: Василий Иосифович Сталин) (later Dzhugashvili; (Note: Russian: Джугашвили) 21 March 1921 – 19 March 1962) was the youngest son of Joseph Stalin, born to his second wife, Nadezhda Alliluyeva. He joined the Air Force when Nazi Germany launched Operation Barbarossa, the invasion of the Soviet Union, in 1941. After the war, he held a few command posts, one of them being Commander of the Air Forces of the Moscow Military District in 1948. After his father died in 1953, Vasily lost his authority and succumbed to severe alcohol dependency. He criticized Soviet leaders, and was ultimately arrested and sent to prison. He was later granted clemency, though he spent the remainder of his life between imprisonment and hospitalization until he died in 1962.

== Early life ==
Vasily was born on 21 March 1921, the son of Joseph Stalin and Nadezhda Alliluyeva. He had an older half-brother, Yakov Dzhugashvili (born 1907), from his father's first marriage to Kato Svanidze, and a younger sister, Svetlana, born in 1926. The family also took in Artyom Sergeyev, the son of Fyodor Sergeyev, a close friend of Joseph. Fyodor died in an accident four months after the birth of Artyom, so the boy was raised in the Stalin household.

As his mother was interested in pursuing a professional career, a nanny, Alexandra Bychokova, was hired to look after Vasily and Svetlana. On 9 November 1932 Vasily's mother shot herself. To conceal the suicide, the children were told that Alliluyeva had died of peritonitis, a complication from appendicitis. It would be 10 years before they learned the truth of their mother's death. Svetlana would later write that the death of their mother had a profound impact on her brother. She noted that he started to drink alcohol at the age of 13, and in drunken episodes would curse and attack her. He became increasingly violent, especially towards Svetlana, and would be quite disruptive at Zubalovo, a dacha outside Moscow, his primary residence.

After the death of Alliluyeva, Joseph Stalin ceased to visit his children; only the nursemaid and head of Stalin's security guards looked after Vasily and his sister. With his father absent, Vasily became close to Karl Pauker, an NKVD officer who worked as a bodyguard for his father. Pauker frequently travelled out of the Soviet Union and would bring back gifts to the younger Stalin, though during the Great Purge he fell out of favor with Joseph Stalin, and he was shot in August 1937. Vasily spent time with other guards as well, drinking with them. He would later reflect that his entire life had been "spent among adults, among guards" and that it left a "deep mark on the whole of [his] private life and character". He tried to gain the attention of his father, writing letters about what he was doing, but Stalin did not reciprocate.

== Military service ==
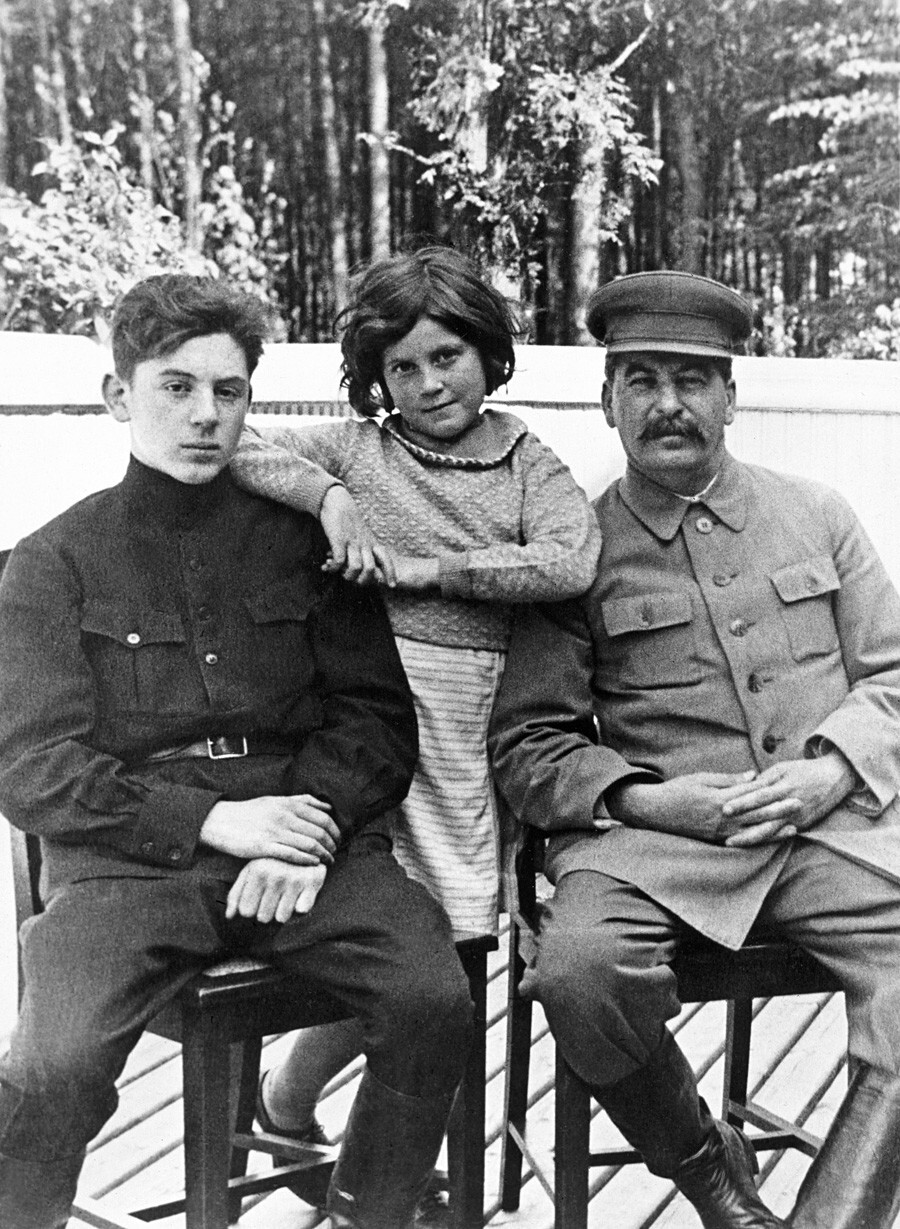
Vasily and his sister Svetlana with their father in 1935

In 1933 Vasily and his sister were enrolled in Moscow Model School No. 25, a prominent public school. Vasily was a poor student, and Svetlana would recall that the teachers would frequently discuss his poor behavior with his father. He was transferred in 1937 to the Special School No. 2, though the faculty there did nothing to curtail his behaviour. One year later Vasily, now aged 17, was sent to the Kacha Military Aviation School. He had initially wanted to attend an artillery school, but as his half-brother Yakov was already enrolled in one, their father did not want them both in the same military branch. His father ordered the school not to grant him any favours or special privileges due to his name, and asked that he should stay in regular army barracks. Vasily did quite well at this school, with a 1939 report to his father noting he was "[d]edicated to the cause of the Party of Lenin-Stalin", and was "interested and well versed in questions related to international and domestic situation". However, the report also noted Vasily tended to study poorly, was unshaven for duty, and reacted "badly to snafus in flight". He completed his schooling in March 1940, with his final marks stating he did "excellent" and was given the rank of air force lieutenant. On 31 December 1940, at 19 years old, he married Galina Burdonskaya, a student at the Moscow State University of Printing Arts.

The Soviet Union was invaded by Nazi Germany on 22 June 1941. Vasily was transferred to the front in August 1941 and given the surname Ivanov in an attempt to conceal his identity. As the son of Stalin, he rarely flew in combat, and when he did he was accompanied by a formation. Vasily took part in 29 combat missions, and is said to have shot down two enemy aircraft. As the son of the Soviet leader, Vasily was hated by most of his colleagues, who felt he was an informant for his father. In the spring of 1942 he was sent back to Moscow, and given the role of inspecting the condition of the air force. He mainly stayed in Moscow for the rest of the war. Bored by his new role, Vasily found himself in trouble after an April 4, 1943 incident where he had explosives dropped into the Moskva River, injuring himself and killing a flight engineer.

As a result of the explosion, Vasily was demoted, though within a year and a half he was promoted to command an air division. He was further promoted to the rank of general, and at the age of 24 was made the youngest major-general in the Red Army. He was also awarded several decorations, including the Order of Red Banner (twice), the Order of Alexander Nevsky, and the Order of Suvorov. After the war he was transferred to Germany as part of the Soviet occupation.

He was promoted to major-general in 1946, to Lieutenant-General in 1947 and Commander of the Air Forces of the Moscow Military District in 1948.

== Post-war ==
After the war, Vasily took up an interest in sports, in particular ice hockey. He helped develop a team to represent the air force, VVS Moscow, and brought in Anatoly Tarasov as the player-coach for the inaugural season in 1946–47. However, Tarasov argued with Vasily over the selection of players and left the team after one season for CDKA Moscow (later CSKA Moscow). On 5 January 1950 a plane carrying the VVS team crashed at Sverdlovsk, killing the team. Even so, VVS won three consecutive Soviet Championship League titles from 1951 to 1953, before Vasily divested himself of the team in the wake of his father's death.

== Arrest and imprisonment ==
Joseph Stalin died on 5 March 1953. Vasily arrived shortly after the death of his father, and in a drunken rage claimed his father had been poisoned. After his father's death, a long period of troubles began for Vasily. The Defense Ministry offered to allow him to take up command of any military district but Moscow, which was the only one he would accept. Denied his choice assignment, Vasily was forced to retire from the military. Less than two months after his father's death, Vasily was arrested on 28 April 1953 because he had visited a restaurant with foreign diplomats. He was charged with denigration of the Soviet Union's leaders, anti-Soviet propaganda and criminal negligence, and sentenced to eight years in prison. The trial was conducted in private and he was denied legal representation. His appeal for clemency to the new Soviet leaders, Nikita Khrushchev and Georgy Malenkov, was unsuccessful. He was imprisoned in the special penitentiary in Vladimir under the name "Vasily Pavlovich Vasilyev". He was released from prison on 11 January 1960. The Central Committee of the Communist Party of the Soviet Union issued him a pension of 300 rubles, an apartment in Moscow, and a three-month treatment vacation in Kislovodsk. He was also granted permission to wear his general's uniform and all his military medals.

On 9 January 1962, he received a passport under his surname "Dzhugashvili".

== Death ==
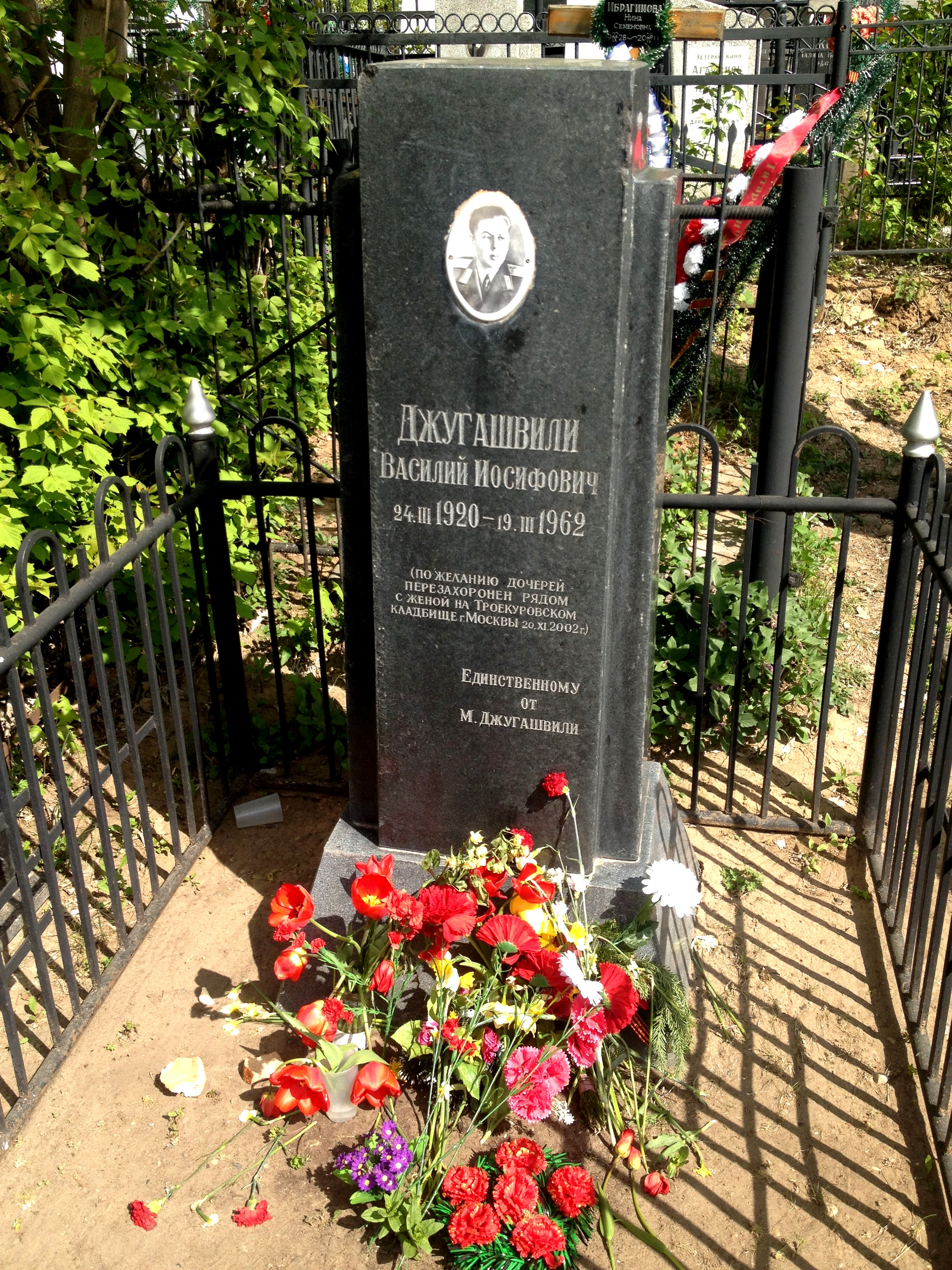
Vasily's grave in Kazan.

Vasily died on 19 March 1962, due to chronic alcoholism, two days before his 41st birthday, and was buried in Arskoe Cemetery.

Vasily was partially rehabilitated in 1999, when the Military Collegium of the Supreme Court lifted charges of anti-Soviet propaganda that dated from 1953. His body was re-buried next to his fourth wife in a Moscow cemetery in 2002.

== Popular culture ==
- Portrayed by David Threlfall in 1983 British television black comedy Red Monarch.
- Portrayed by Rupert Friend in Armando Ianucci's 2017 comedy-satire The Death of Stalin.
- Portrayed by Vladimir Steklov in 1991 film My Best Friend, General Vasili, Son of Joseph Stalin, filmed in Russia on locations in Moscow, Saint Petersburg and Kazan.

== Honours and awards ==
Soviet Union

Order of the Red Banner, three times (20 June 1942, 2 July 1944, 22 June 1948)
Order of Suvorov, 2nd class (29 May 1945)
Order of Alexander Nevsky (3 November 1943)
Medal "For Battle Merit" (1948)
Medal "For the Defence of Moscow" (1 May 1944)
Medal "For the Defence of Stalingrad" (1942)
Medal "For the Victory over Germany in the Great Patriotic War 1941–1945" (1945)
Medal "For the Capture of Berlin" (1945)
Medal "For the Liberation of Warsaw" (1945)
Jubilee Medal "30 Years of the Soviet Army and Navy" (22 February 1948)
Medal "In Commemoration of the 800th Anniversary of Moscow" (1947)

Foreign Awards

Cross of Grunwald, 3rd class (Poland, 1945)
Medal "For Warsaw 1939–1945" (Poland, 1945)
Medal "For Oder, Neisse and the Baltic" (Poland, 1945)

== Military ranks ==
- In March 1940 – Lieutenant (graduation of a military school (uchilische))
- In December 1941 – Major (there is no information about how and when he received the ranks of Senior Lieutenant and Captain, as well, there is no information whether he received them at all or whether he was promoted to Major right after Lieutenant)
- 19 February 1942 (3 months after being promoted to "major") – Colonel (at the age of 20, by-passing the rank of "Lieutenant Colonel)
- 1 March 1946 (3 weeks before he turned 25) – Major General of Aviation
- 11 May 1949 – Lieutenant General of Aviation

== Bibliography ==
- Alliluyeva, Svetlana (1967), Twenty Letters to a Friend, translated by Johnson, Priscilla, London: Hutchinson, ISBN 0-060-10099-0
- Holmes, Larry E. (1999), Stalin's School: Moscow's Model School No. 25, 1931–1937, Pittsburgh: University of Pittsburgh Press, ISBN 0-8229-4101-5
- Kotkin, Stephen (2014), Stalin, Volume 1: Paradoxes of Power, 1878–1928, New York City: Penguin Press, ISBN 978-1-59420-379-4
- Kotkin, Stephen (2017), Stalin, Volume 2: Waiting for Hitler, 1929–1941, New York City: Penguin Press, ISBN 978-1-59420-380-0
- Kun, Miklós (2003), Stalin: An Unknown Portrait, translated by Bodóczky, Miklós; Hideg, Rachel; Higed, János; Vörös, Miklós, Budapest: Central European University Press, ISBN 963-9241-19-9
- Lyubimova, Olga (30 November 2017), "Пил и говорил всем, что сын вождя". Как жил и умер в Казани Василий Сталин ["He drank and told everyone that he was the son of the leader." How Vasily Stalin lived and died in Kazan] (in Russian), Argumenty i Fakty
- Martin, Lawrence (1990), The Red Machine: The Soviet Quest to Dominate Canada's Game, Toronto: Doubleday Canada, ISBN 0-385-25272-2
- Montefiore, Simon Sebag (2003), Stalin: The Court of the Red Tsar, London: Phoenix, ISBN 978-0-7538-1766-7
- Montefiore, Simon Sebag (2007), Young Stalin, London: Phoenix, ISBN 978-0-297-85068-7
- Nepomnyashchiy, Nikolay (2011). 100 великих тайн советской эпохи [100 Great Mysteries of the Soviet Era] (in Russian). Veche. ISBN 978-5-9533-6008-1.
- Richardson, Rosamond (1993), The Long Shadow: Inside Stalin's Family, London: Little, Brown and Company, ISBN 0-316-90553-4
- Service, Robert (2010), Stalin: A Biography, London: Pan Books, ISBN 978-0-330-51837-6
- Sullivan, Rosemary (2015), Stalin's Daughter: The Extraordinary and Tumultuous Life of Svetlana Alliluyeva, Toronto: HarperCollins, ISBN 978-1-44341-442-5
