= Kureika (village) =

Village in northern Siberia, Russia

Kureika Куре́йка
- (a posyolok)
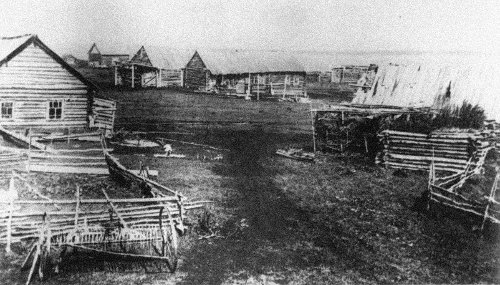
- Village of Kureika (c. 1939), including the home where Joseph Stalin lived with Lidiya Pereprygina
- Interactive map of Kureika
- Location of Kureika Kureika (Krasnoyarsk Krai)
- Coordinates: 66°28′1″N 87°10′21″E
- Country: Russia
- Federal subject: Krasnoyarsk Krai
- Administrative district: Turukhansky District

Population
  - Estimate (2010): 78 )

Municipal status
  - Municipal district: Turukhansky Municipal District
- Time zone: UTC+7 (MSK+4)
- Postal code: 663213
- OKTMO ID: 04654701942

Kureika (Russian: Куре́йка) is a Russian village just north of the Arctic Circle near Turukhansk in Krasnoyarsk Krai, by the confluence of Kureika River and Yenisey.

== History ==
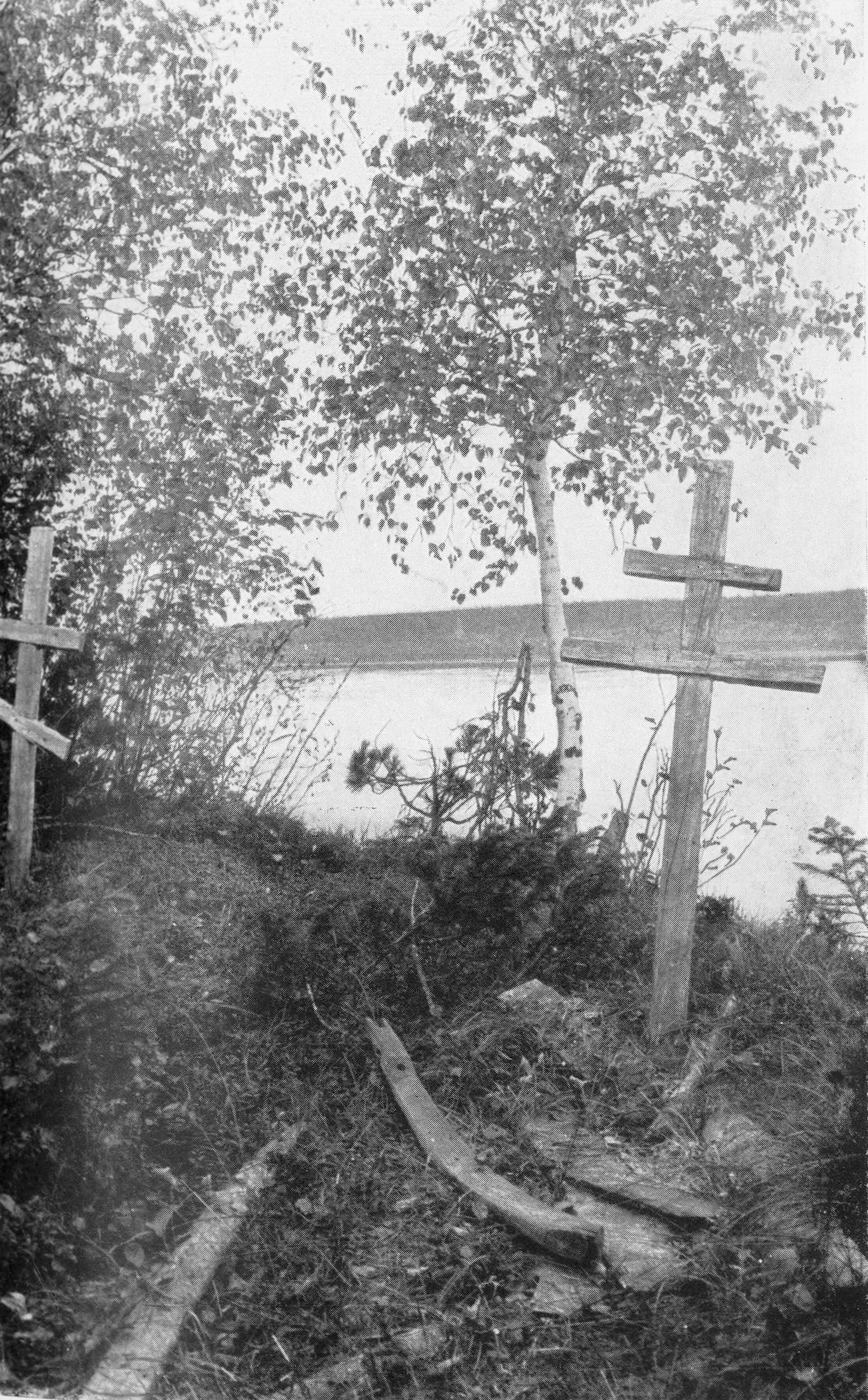
The grave of a Yenisei ostyak with a sledge near Kureika, 1913. The picture of F. Nansen

During the 1910s, the village was a small hamlet containing only eight or ten wooden homes with villagers living in impoverished conditions.

Joseph Stalin spent his final exile in Kureika from March 1914 until October 1916. Stalin moved in with fellow a Bolshevik, Yakov Sverdlov, but Stalin soon moved out due to rising tensions between the two, moving in instead with the Pereprygina family. According to his cohabitant Lidiya Pereprygina, Stalin spent much of his time away from the village itself, fishing and hunting with a khanty named Martin Peterin, and when he did spend time in the village it resting, reading, or joining in local festivities.

In 1938, the Stalin museum in Kureika was established. In 1952 a pavilion was built surrounding and preserving the izba (wooden hut) Stalin had lived in during his exile. The museum was closed and hut was demolished, along with Stalin's statue, during de-Stalinization in 1961, and the pavilion was burnt in a fire in 1996.

== Population ==
1989	422
2002	▼181
2010	▼78
