= Sekonda =

British wristwatch manufacturer

- Founded: 1966; 60 years ago in the Soviet Union
- Founder: ChasProm
- Website: sekonda.co.uk

Sekonda is a British wristwatch manufacturer. Established in 1966, Sekonda watches were originally produced in the Soviet Union, at the First Moscow Watch Factory in Moscow and the Petrodvorets Watch Factory in Leningrad. Many Soviet-era Sekonda watches exported to the West were re-badged Poljot and Raketa watches.

The 'Sekonda' brand was created by ChasProm in 1966 for the export of the best watches from all the USSR's watch factories, including Slava. The factories that built Sekonda watches (generally relabelling their other brands) were:

- 1st Moscow Watch Factory (Poljot)
- 2nd Moscow Watch Factory (Slava)
- Uglich Watch Factory (Chaika)
- Petrodvorets Watch Factory (Raketa)
- Minsk Watch Factory (Luch)
- Chelyabinsk Watch Factory (Molnija)
- Penza Watch Factory (Zarja)
- Chistopol Watch Factory (Vostok)
- Maslennikov Factory (ZIM, Pobeda, Elektronika)
- Integral Electronics (Elektronika-5)

They ran a TV advert featuring the band Madness in 1992, shortly before they reunited for their Madstock concert that August.

Following the breakup of the Soviet Union, Sekonda no longer has Russian ties and all its watches have been produced from factories in Hong Kong since 1993. Sekonda also markets watches under the sub-brand SEKSY for ladies' fashion, ONE for men's fashion and Xpose for rugged outdoor lifestyles of either gender. Between 1998 and 2002, Sekonda was the title sponsor of the Superleague, then the top flight division in British ice hockey, and the precursor to the Elite League.
