= Zarya (watches) =

- Product type: watch movements, watches
- Produced by: Penza watch factory
- Country: Soviet Union; Russia
- Introduced: 1949; 77 years ago
- Website: zaria-time.ru

Zarya (Russian: Заря, lit. "Dawn") is a Soviet and Russian brand of mechanical wristwatches produced by the Penza watch factory.

== History ==
The Penza watch factory was created on the basis of the Penza Frunze Plant by a 1935 Soviet government decree. The watchmakers assigned to the plant completed an internship at the First Moscow Watch Factory and the Second Moscow Watch Factory. The senior engineer of the newly established Penza watch factory also finished training at LIP. The French partner provided the Soviet factory with licenses and equipment to manufacture watches.

The factory became fully operational in May 1940. It produced several models, such as T-18 Zvezda, K-26 Pobeda, and others. In 1949, the Penza watch factory focused exclusively on women's watches. Around 1950, the engineers of the Penza watch factory developed a new compact movement named Zarya that also became the name of the line of watches. Zarya-5, designed in 1963, became the thinnest women's wristwatch made in USSR to date. In 1965, Zarya became the name for all timepieces by the Penza watch factory (thus, other brands got indexes such as Zarya-2009 for the Vesna model). In 1968, the factory produced Zarya-2014, the first Soviet women's wristwatch with an instantaneous calendar complication.

During the Soviet period, the watches manufactured in Penza were a strong regional brand and were exported to 52 countries.

After the collapse of the USSR, the factory faced severe financial difficulties before going bankrupt in 1998. In the early 2000s, production was resumed on a smaller scale, partially using components imported from Japan, China, and Hong Kong.
