= Jacques von Polier =

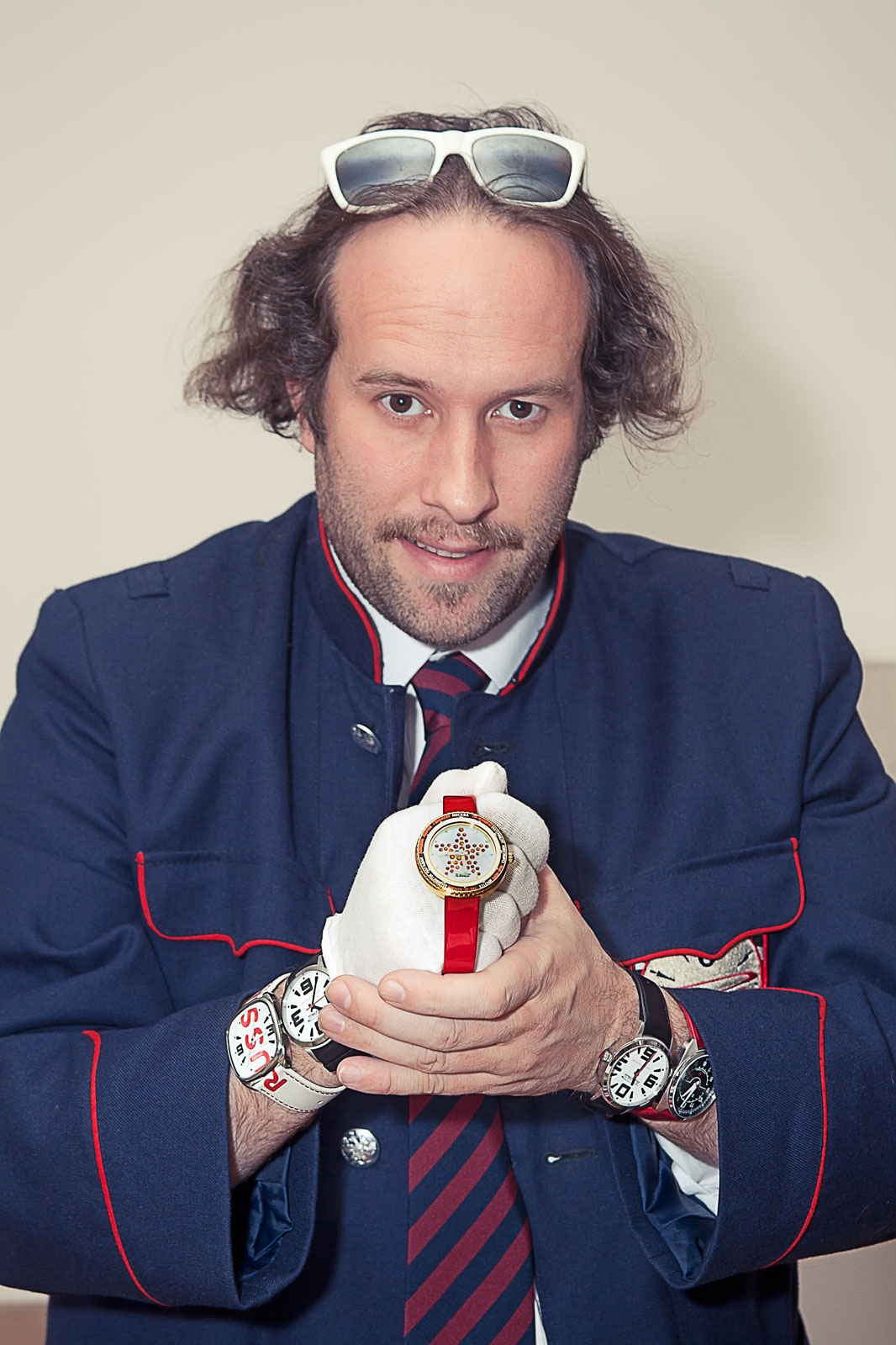
- Moscow 2012
- Born: 5 September 1979 (age 46); Paris, France
- Occupation: Designer
- Known for: Head of Creative and Design Dept. Petrodvorets Watch Factory

Jacques von Polier (Russian: Жак фон Полье) (born 5 September 1979 in Paris) is a French designer based in Russia. He has collaborated on various artistic and design projects and heads the creative and design department of the "Petrodvorets Watch Factory - Raketa". With David Henderson-Stewart, they are the keystone of restructuring and rebranding Russia's historical watch brand "Raketa".

== Biography ==
In 1999, von Polier was appointed a UNESCO Goodwill Ambassador by Doudou Diène, then Director of the Division of Inter-cultural Projects. Polier took part with Julien Delpech in a one-year expedition in Central Asia with the support of the UNESCO. In 2000, he had his first photo exhibition at the UNESCO headquarters in Paris. In 2010, von Polier had a Design Exhibition in Moscow supported by businessman Gideon Weinbaum.

A bestselling author, von Polier is author of the French-language book Davaï ! sur les chemins de l'Eurasie about Russia and Eurasia, published in 2002 by Éditions Robert Laffont.

In 2011, he won an election organized by the Russian press of the "Top 50 of Saint-Petersburg's most famous people" for fashion.

In 2012, von Polier had the main role in the Ukrainian TV serial Princes Undercover (in Russian: Принц желает познакомиться) on Ukrainian channel 1+1.

In 2014, he designed the largest watch mechanism in the world Raketa Monumental, which is installed in central Moscow at Lubyanka Square. Raketa and von Polier were joined by the mechanical engineer Florian Schlumpf for production and technical supervision.
