= Lubyanka Square =

Public open space in central Moscow

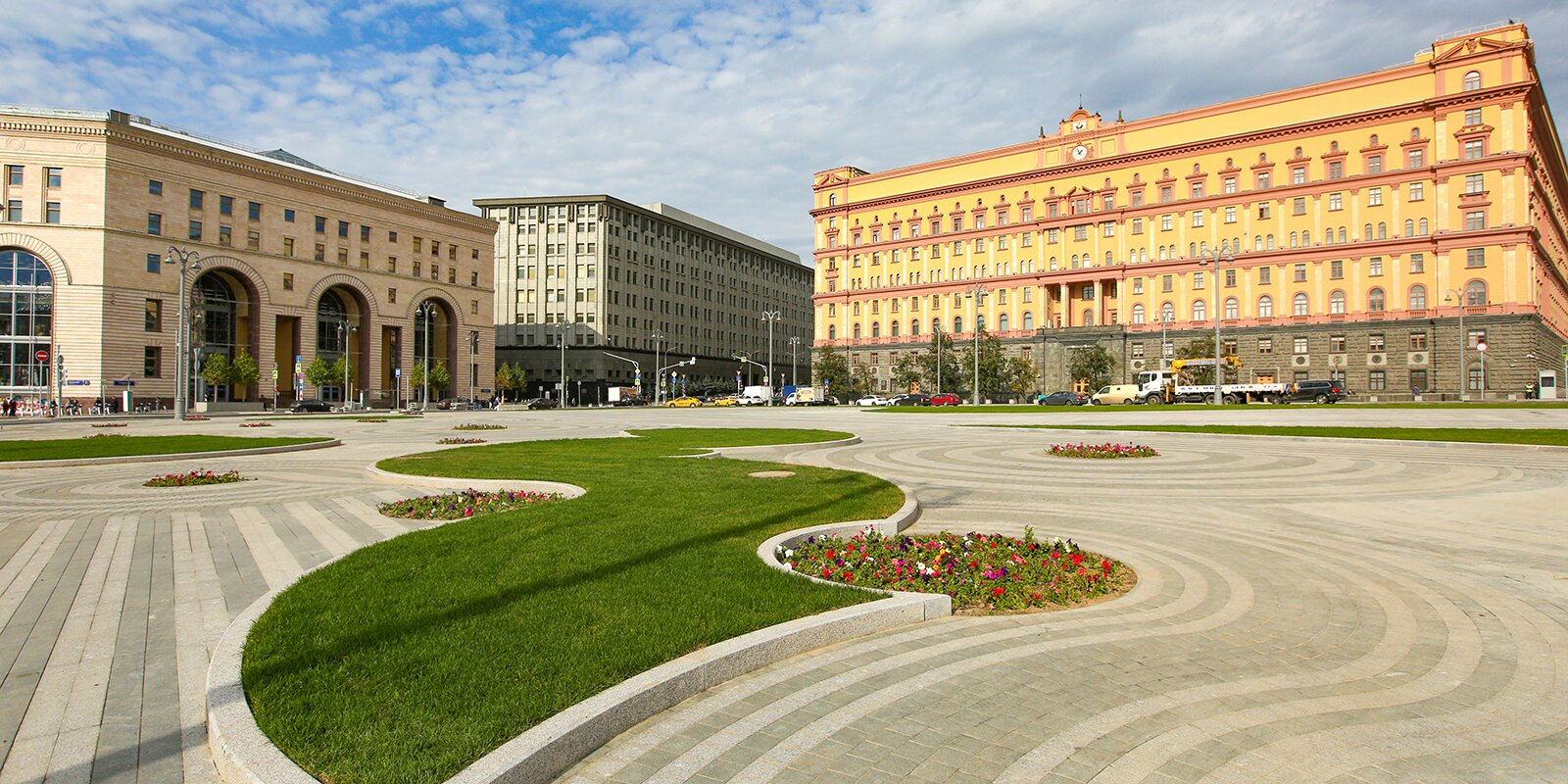
- FSB headquarters and Central Children's Store in Lubyanka Square
- Interactive map of Lubyanka Square
- Native name: Лубянская площадь (Russian)
- Location: Moscow; Central Administrative Okrug; Tverskoy District
- Postal code: 101000
- Nearest metro station: Lubyanka
- Coordinates: 55°45′34″N 37°37′37″E

Lubyanskaya Square (Russian: Лубянская площадь, romanized: Lubyanskaya ploshchad'), or simply Lubyanka in Moscow lies about 900 metres (980 yd) north-east of Red Square. History first records its name in 1480, when Grand Prince Ivan III of Moscow, who had conquered Novgorod in 1471, settled many Novgorodians in the area. They built the church of St Sophia, modelled after St Sophia Cathedral in Novgorod, and called the area Lubyanka after the Lubyanitsa street of their native city.

== Name ==
The square was renamed Dzerzhinsky Square for many years (1926–1990) in honor of the founder of the Soviet security service Felix Dzerzhinsky.

== Square center ==
A fountain used to stand in front of the building, at the center of the Lubyanka Square. In 1958, the fountain at the center of the Lubyanka Square was replaced by an 11-ton statue of Felix Dzerzhinsky ("Iron Felix"), founder of the Cheka, made by Yevgeny Vuchetich. In 2014, Jacques von Polier designed the Raketa Monumental which is largest watch mechanism in the world. It is currently installed at the square.

On October 30, 1990, the Memorial organization erected the Solovetsky Stone, a monument to the victims of the Gulag, a simple stone from the Solovki prison camp in the White Sea. In 1991 the statue of Dzerzhinsky was removed by liberal protesters following the failure of the coup attempt against Mikhail Gorbachev, and the square's original name was officially restored.

== Lubyanka Building ==
Lubyanka Square is best known for the monumental Lubyanka Building, designed by Aleksandr V. Ivanov and constructed from 1897 to 1898. Originally built for the insurance company Rossiya, it later became better known for housing the headquarters of the KGB in its various incarnations. As of 2016 the Federal Security Service of the Russian Federation (FSB) occupies the building.

== Detsky Mir ==
Opposite the FSB building stands the massive Central Children's Store, known by its historical name of Detsky Mir (Russian: Де́тский мир, "Children World"), Europe's largest children's store, built between 1953 and 1957, and fully restored in 2014. It hosts in its main atrium the world's largest mechanical clock movement: Raketa Monumental.

== Metro ==
The Moscow Metro station Lubyanka operates under Lubyanka Square.

== Gallery ==
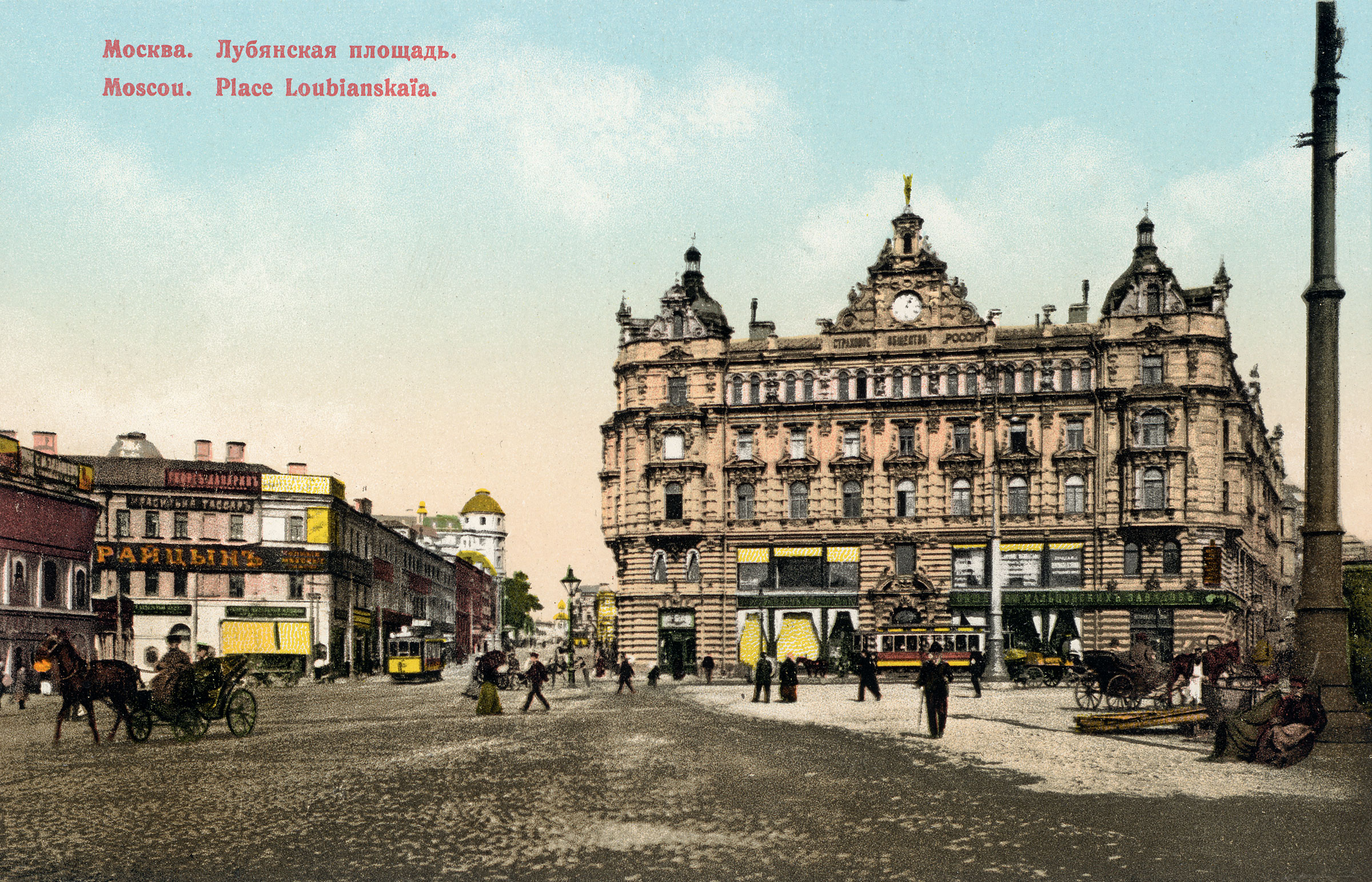
Lubyanka Square in the early 1900s

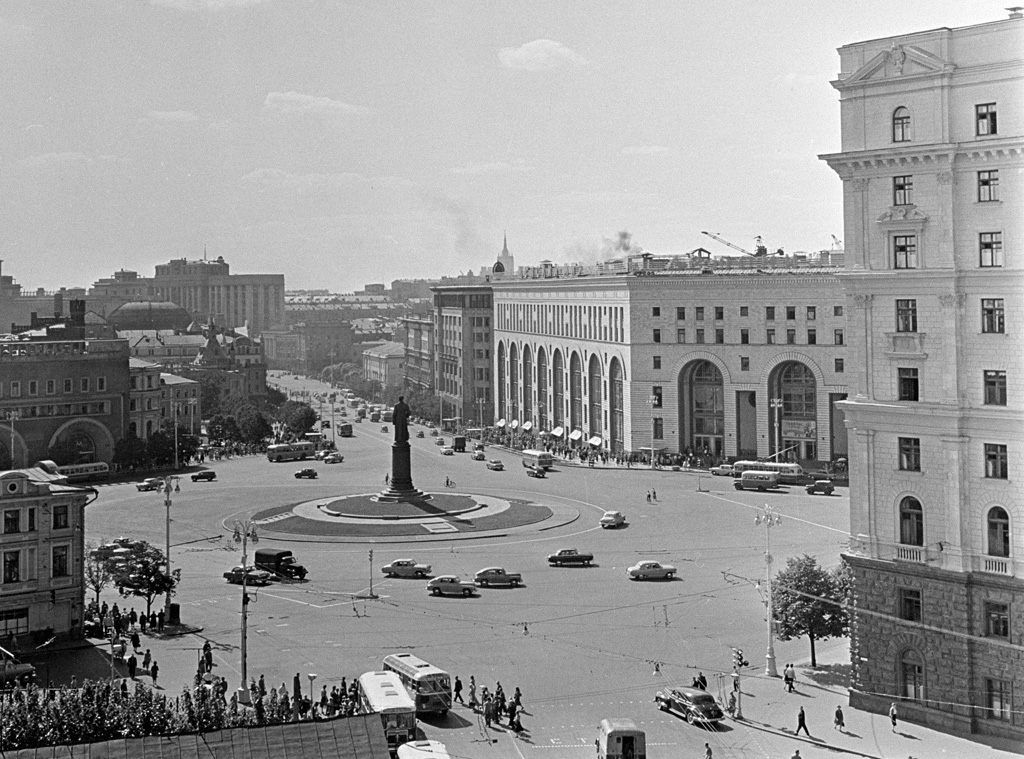
Dzerzhinsky Square in 1966, with the statue of Felix Dzerzhinsky

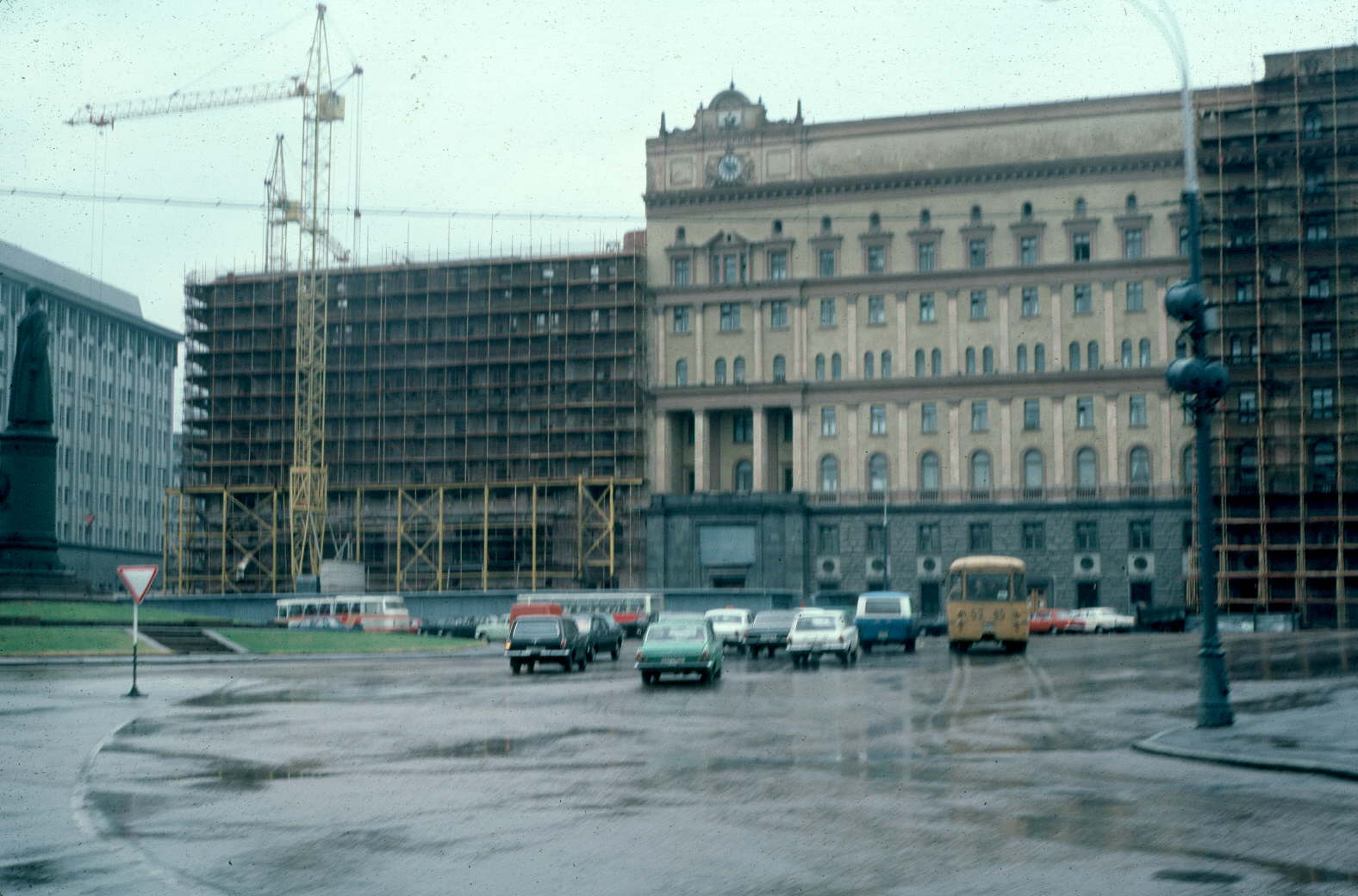
KGB building in 1983

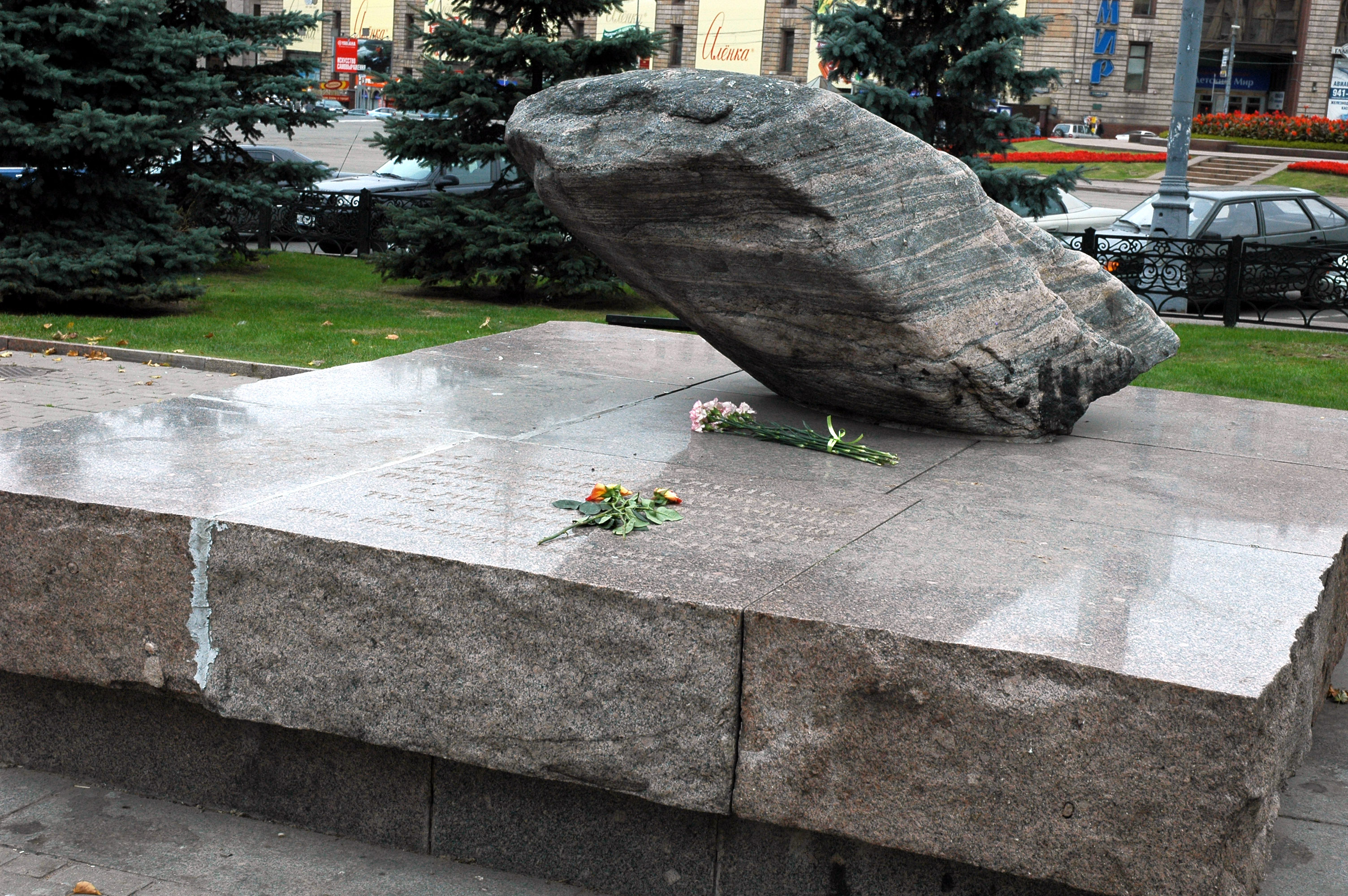
The Solovetsky Stone monument

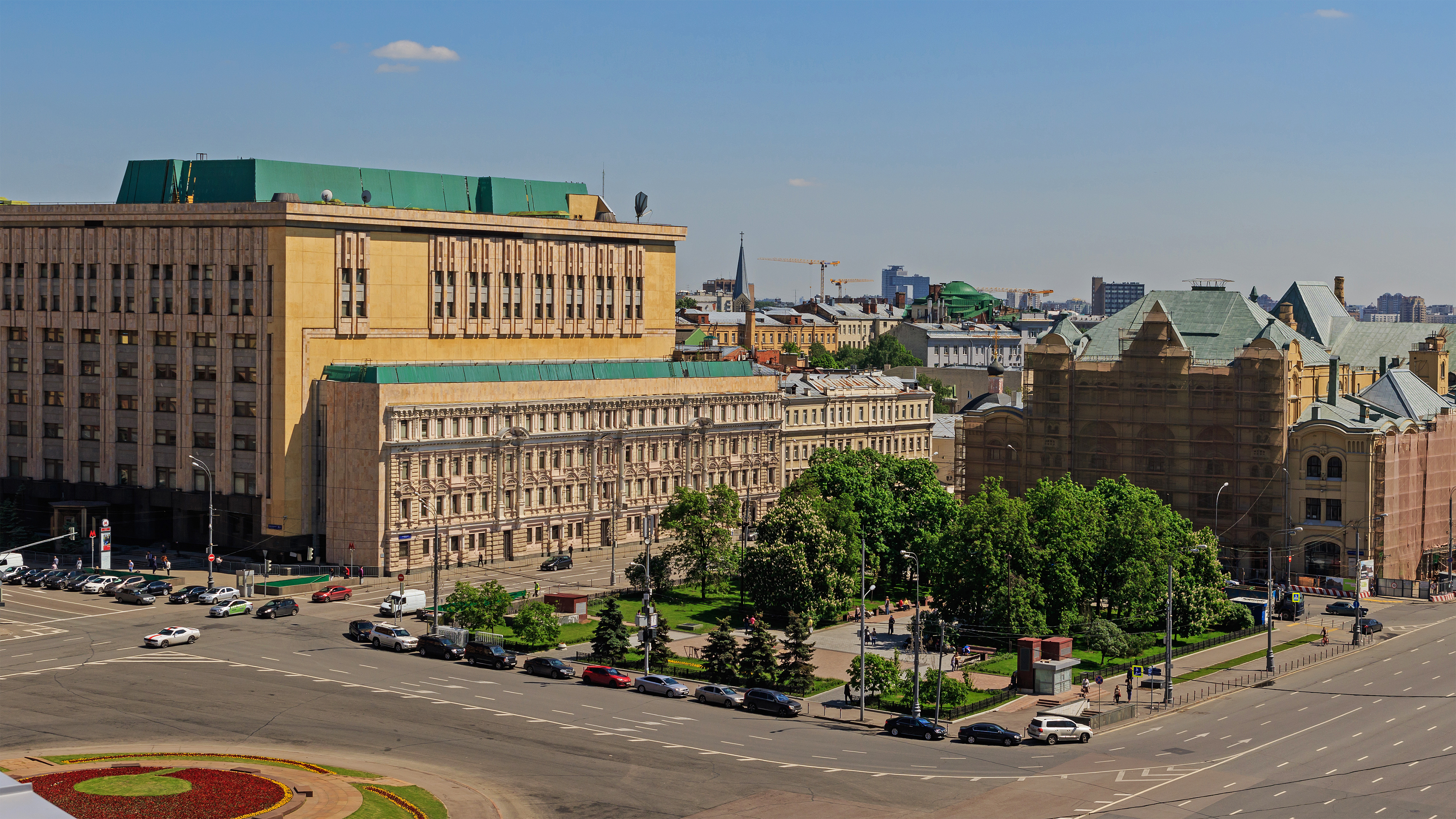
A less common view
