= Pobeda (watch) =

Russian brand of wrist-watches

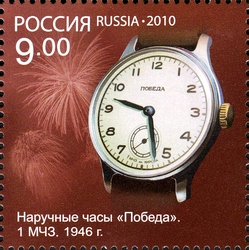
- A Pobeda watch, 1946, on a Russian stamp, 2010
- Current owner: Petrodvorets Watch Factory
- Country: Russia
- Introduced: 1945
- Related brands: Raketa

Pobeda (Russian: Победа, Victory) is a Russian brand of wrist-watches owned by the Petrodvorets Watch Factory "Raketa". The brand name was chosen by Stalin himself in April 1945, when he gave the order that the first watches be ready for the 1st year of Victory celebration. The first prototype came out of the Penza factory by the end of 1945, and the first model for the public came out of the Kirov Watch Factory in March 1946.

== History of the Watch Movement "Pobeda" ==
Based on a French design, the Pobeda's simple, 15-jewel movement was cost-effective, reliable, and easy to manufacture and maintain. Prior to World War II, during a period of rapid industrialization in the Soviet Union, the Soviet government sought international funding and expertise in developing a domestic industry for timepieces. Eventually the French watch manufacturer LIP was chosen; they established a new watch factory in Penza and licensed several movement designs to the new establishment. One design dating from 1908, the R-26 movement, was further developed and renamed the K-26, with significant alterations to the original design. World War II temporarily disrupted these plans, but after the Allied victory, this watch design was quickly finished at Penza, and full-scale production commenced at the First Moscow Watch Factory. Joseph Stalin chose the name Pobeda (Victory) to celebrate the end of the war.

== Factories ==
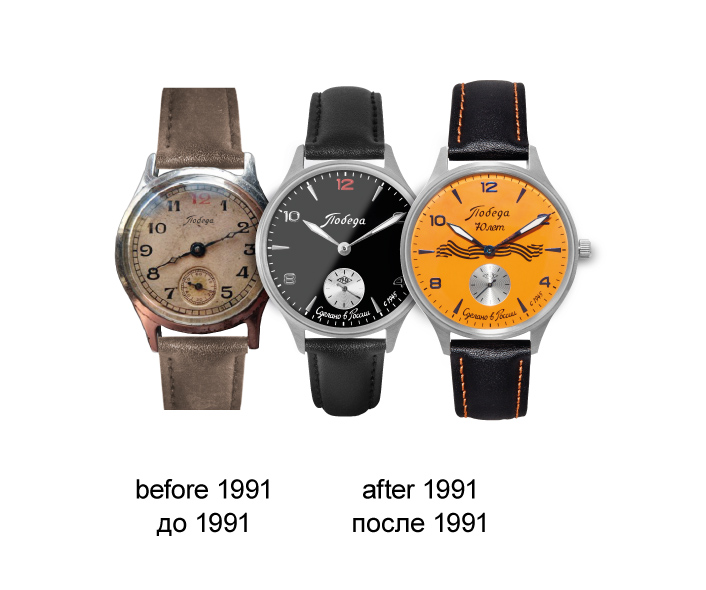
Pobeda watches before and after the fall of the Soviet Union

In the Soviet Union era, Pobeda watches were produced at following plants:

- Penza Watch Factory (Пензенский Часовой Завод): for a few years from 1945
- First Moscow Watch Factory (Первый Московский Часовой Завод): 1946 to 1953
- Petrodvorets Watch Factory (Петродворцовый Часовой Завод): 1946 to today
- Chistopol Watch Factory (Чистопольский часовой завод): 1949 to the c.1950
- Second Moscow Watch Factory (Второй московский часовой завод): 1953 to 1964
- Maslennikov Factory (Завод имени Масленникова): c.1951 to 2004

In post-Soviet Russia, Pobeda watches are made solely at the Petrodvorets Watch Factory in Saint Petersburg. The factory is also developing other fashion accessories under this brand.

== Other Brands that have used the "Pobeda" Movement ==
While the basic K-26 design was shared by these manufacturers, some of them carried on building watches using movements of the same fundamental design under various names, incorporating further refinements and alterations, such as shockproofing, and automatic day/date indicators. For instance, Petrodvorets used brand names including Lotos, Majak ("Маяк", Lighthouse), Neva ("Нева", the Neva River), Start ("Старт"), Svet ("Свет", Light), and Raketa (Ракета, Rocket), which eventually became the firm's single brand name from 1962. The Chistopol plant produced Chaika ("Чайка", Seagull), Druzhba ("Дружба", Friendship), Jantar ("Янтарь", Amber), Kama ("Кама", River Kama), Kolos ("Колос", Spike), Raduga ("Радуга", Rainbow), Rubin ("Рубин"), Saturn ("Сатурн"), Uran ("Уран"), and Vostok, which became the standard brand for the company.

First Moscow Watch Factory further developed a centre-second variant of this movement and it was not only made under the Pobeda name, but also became the basis of a generation of watches including the Sportivnie ("Спортивные", for sportsman), Sturmanskie ("Штурманские", for navigator), etc. A lasting legacy of the Pobeda can be seen in the Raketa 2609-series movements: while still in production, they are dimensionally fully compatible with the K-26.

Pobeda watches were sold across the Soviet Union and many other Warsaw Pact nations, and today they are ubiquitous in Eastern Europe and Central Asia. Many Pobeda watches were created to commemorate special occasions, such as victories in battle, Party congresses, or space flights. These commemorative watches were often given as gifts.
