= Lubyanka Building =

Headquarters of the FSB in Moscow, Russia

Lubyanka
- Лубянка
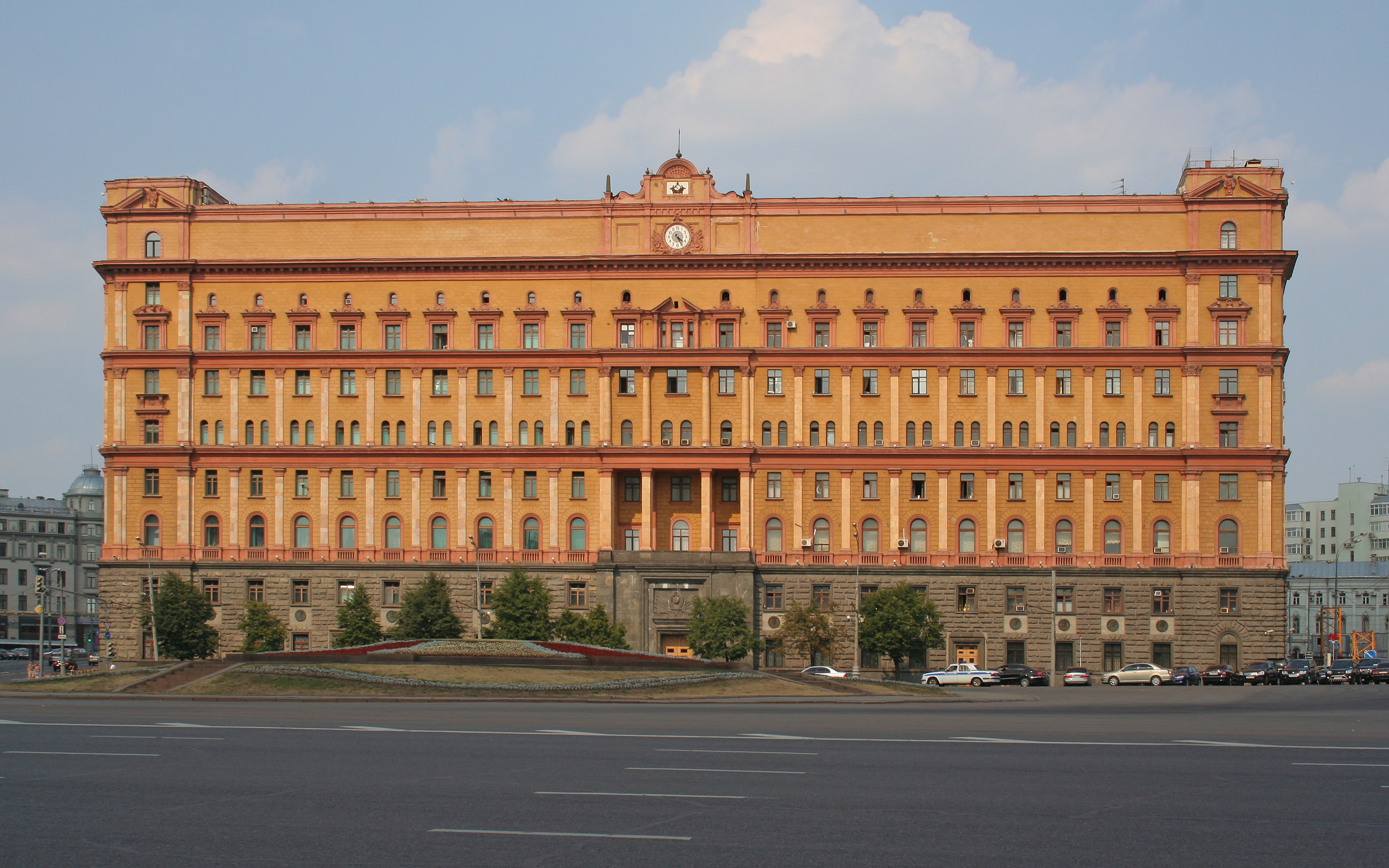

General information
- Architectural style: Neo-Baroque
- Location: Moscow, Russia
- Current tenants: FSB
- Completed: 1898

Design and construction
- Architect: Alexander V. Ivanov

Lubyanka (Russian: Лубянка, IPA: [lʊˈbʲankə]) is the popular name for the building which contains the headquarters of the FSB on Lubyanka Square in the Meshchansky District of Moscow, Russia. It is a large Neo-Baroque building with a facade of yellow brick designed by Alexander V. Ivanov in 1897 and augmented by Aleksey Shchusev from 1940 to 1947. It was previously the national headquarters of the KGB. Soviet hammer-and-sickles can still be seen on the building's facade.

== Current use ==
The Lubyanka building is home to the Lubyanka prison, the headquarters of the Border Guard Service, a KGB museum and a subsection of the FSB. Part of the prison was turned into a prison museum, but a special authorization is required for visits.

== Description ==
The lower floors are made of granite with emblazoned Soviet crests.

== History ==
=== Origins ===
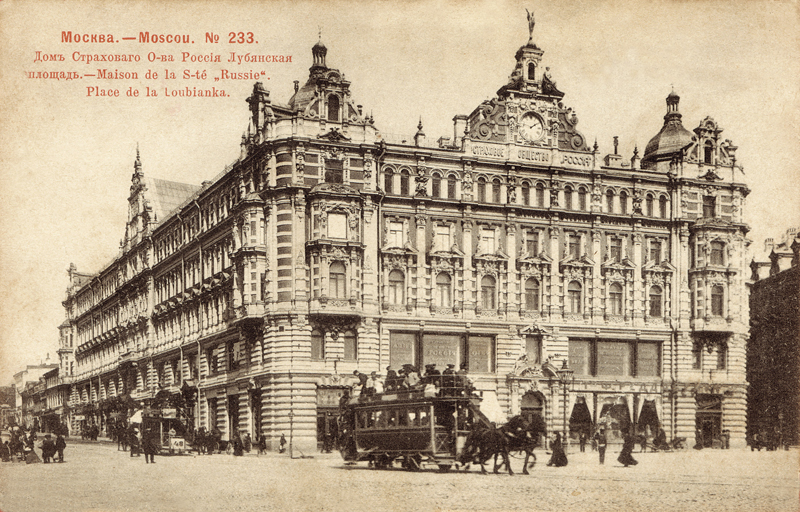
The Lubyanka as originally built, as the headquarters of the All-Russia Insurance Company, before 1917

The Lubyanka was originally built in 1898 as a revenue house by the All-Russia Insurance Company (Rossiya Insurance Company), on the spot where Catherine the Great had once headquartered her secret police. The building was designed by the architect Alexander V. Ivanov. It is noted for its parquet floors and pale green walls. Belying its massiveness, the edifice avoids an impression of heroic scale: isolated Palladian and Baroque details, such as the minute pediments over the corner bays and the central loggia, are lost in an endlessly repeating palace facade where three bands of cornices emphasize the horizontal lines. A clock is centered in the uppermost band of the facade.

A fountain used to stand in front of the building, at the center of Lubyanka Square.

Following the Bolshevik Revolution, in 1918 the structure was taken over by the government, for use as the headquarters of the secret police, then called the Cheka. The prison became operational in 1920. Its prisoners included Boris Savinkov, Osip Mandelstam, Gen. Władysław Anders, and Aleksandr Solzhenitsyn. In Soviet Russian jokes, it was referred to as "the tallest building in Moscow", since Siberia (a euphemism for the Gulag labour camp system) could be seen from its basement. The prison is on the top floor, but since there are no windows on that floor, most prisoners, and therefore popular conception, thought they were being detained in its basement.

=== KGB ===
During the Great Purge, the offices became increasingly cramped due to staff numbers. In 1940, Aleksey Shchusev was commissioned to enlarge the building. By 1947, his new design had doubled Lubyanka's size horizontally, with the original structure taking up the left half of the facade (as viewed from the street). He added another storey and extended the structure by incorporating backstreet buildings. Shchusev's design accentuated Neo-Renaissance detailing, but only the right part of the facade was constructed under his direction in the 1940s, due to the war and other hindrances.

Raoul Wallenberg was detained in the Lubyanka prison, where he reportedly died in 1947. According to the KGB, prisoners' interrogations stopped at Lubyanka in 1953 after the death of Stalin.

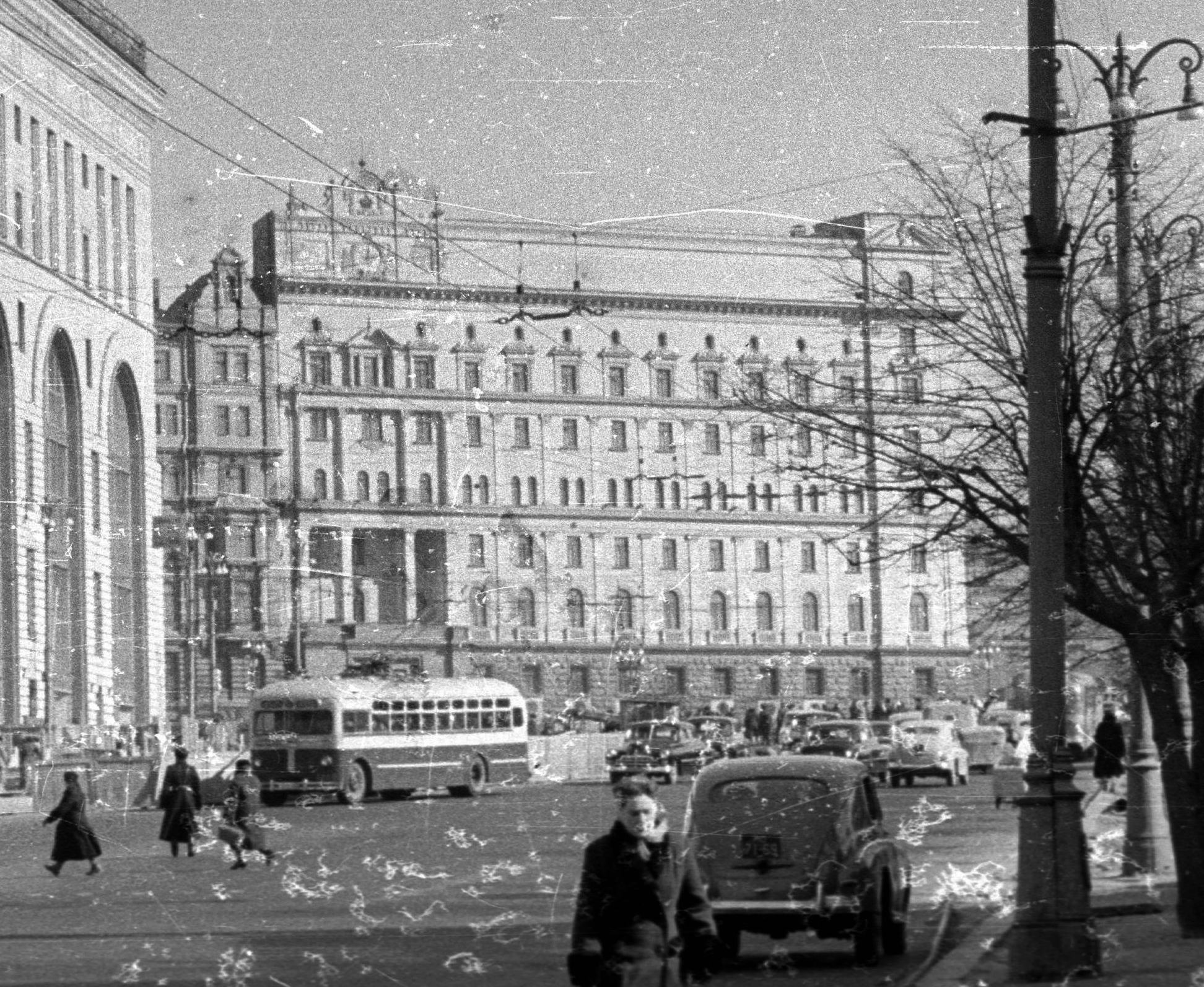
The Lubyanka in 1961

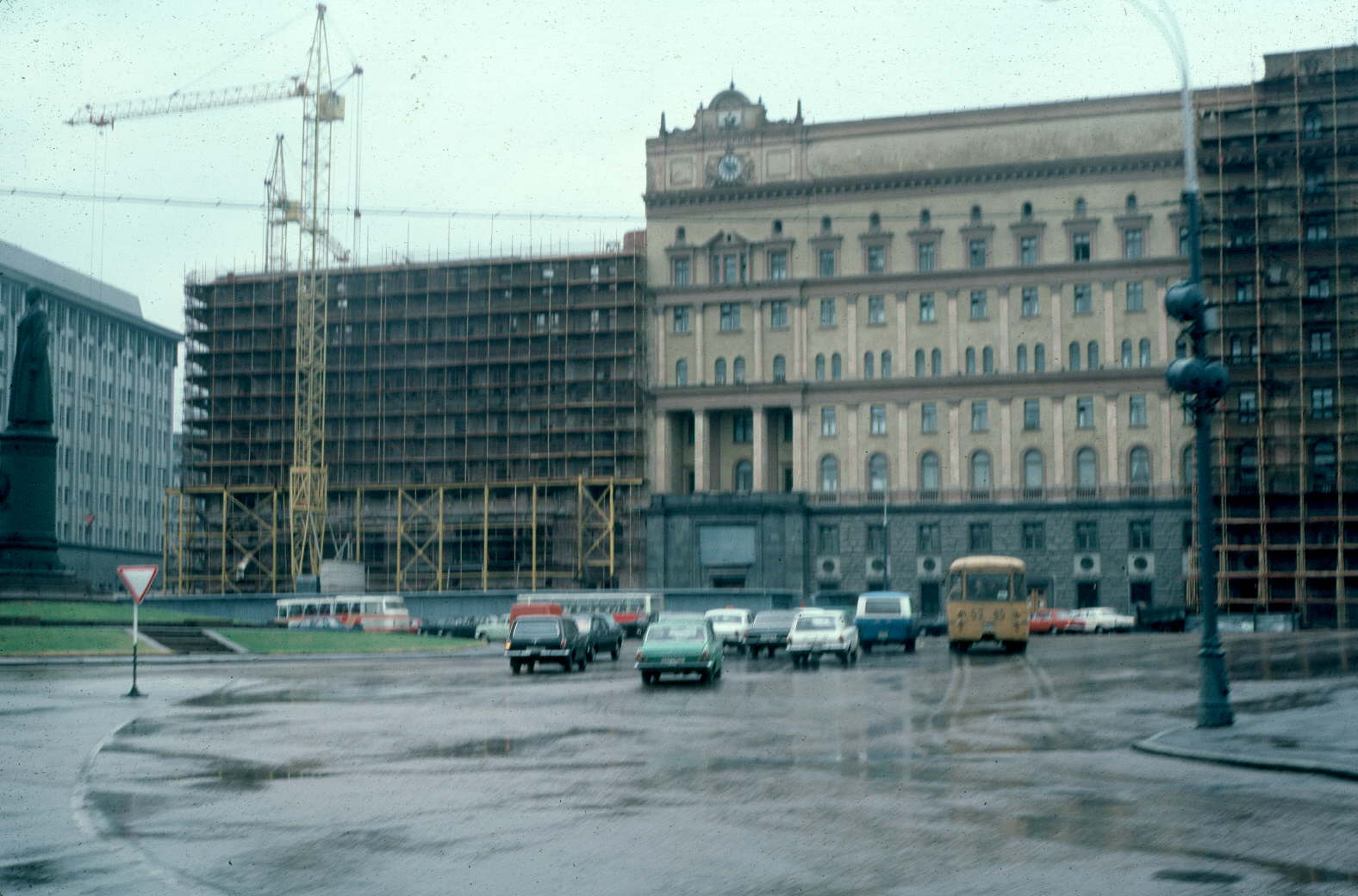
The Lubyanka during renovations in 1983, with the left half still lower.

In 1957, Russia's largest toy shop, Detsky Mir, opened on the opposite side of Lubyanka Square, where a medieval cannon foundry was previously located. In 1958, the fountain at the center of Lubyanka Square was replaced by an 11-ton (or 14-ton, or 15-ton) statue of Felix Dzerzhinsky ("Iron Felix"), founder of the Cheka.

In 1972, Vasili Mitrokhin moved 300,000 KGB files from the Lubyanka building, copies or notes of some of which he gave to the British intelligence service MI6 in 1992.

The building's asymmetric façade survived intact until 1983, when the original structure was reconstructed to match the new build, at the urging of Communist Party General Secretary and former KGB Director Yuri Andropov in accordance with Shchusev's plans.

Although the Soviet secret police changed its name many times, its headquarters remained in this building. Secret police chiefs from Lavrenty Beria to Andropov used the same office on the third floor, which looked down on the statue of Cheka founder Felix Dzerzhinsky. A prison on the ground floor of the building figures prominently in Aleksandr Solzhenitsyn's book The Gulag Archipelago. Famous inmates held, tortured and interrogated there include Sidney Reilly, Greville Wynne, Raoul Wallenberg, Ion Antonescu, Osip Mandelstam, Genrikh Yagoda, János Esterházy, Alexander Dolgun, Rochus Misch, and Walter Ciszek.

During the 1980s, the prison was turned into a cafeteria for KGB staff.

=== Post-KGB ===
After the dissolution of the KGB in 1991, the Lubyanka became the headquarters of the Border Guard Service of Russia, as well as the Lubyanka prison, and is one directorate of the Federal Security Service of the Russian Federation (FSB). A museum of the KGB (now called Историко-демонстрационный зал ФСБ России, Historical Demonstration hall of the Russian FSB) was opened to the public.

In 1990, an employee of the Lubyanka, Katya Mayorova, became Miss KGB, the first official "security services beauty title". In 1990, the Solovetsky Stone was erected across from the Lubyanka, to commemorate the victims of political repression. In August 1991, the statue of Felix Dzerzhinsky was dismantled and removed from the center of the Lubyanka Square. That same year, Western visitors were allowed to tour the building's prison for the first time.

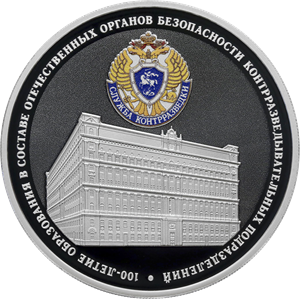
The Lubyanka on a Russian commemorative coin, 2022

Remains of Adolf Hitler, as well as those of Joseph and Magda Goebbels, were presented at the Lubyanka in a 2004 documentary.

Hitler's personal Golden Party Badge, which was discovered by the Red Army after the capture of Berlin, was stored in the Lubyanka. The badge was stolen in 2005, when guards thought a cat had set off the alarms, allowing the burglar to escape.

In 2015, the Lubyanka's front door was set on fire by Pyotr Pavlensky, a performance artist. He was released from jail six months later. In 2017, a huge church was consecrated next to the Lubyanka building on the grounds of the Sretensky Monastery. The church is dedicated to the New Martyrs and Confessors of the Russian Orthodox Church, including those who were executed at Lubyanka (more than a thousand people from 1944 to 1969). In December 2019, a shooting took place around the Lubyanka.

== Modernity ==
In 2008, the wing of the house from Myasnitskaya Street received the status of a cultural heritage site. In 2011, it underwent reconstruction. During this period, information appeared about the installation of a helipad on the roof of the building. According to the head of Rosokhrankultura Viktor Petrakov, it has existed for a long time. Although the roof of the building was not protected, representatives of the Moscow Department of Cultural Heritage stated that the project was not approved and the reconstruction was carried out without proper documentation. Details of the restoration of the facades, which took place in 2013–2014, were not disclosed due to the secret status of the object.

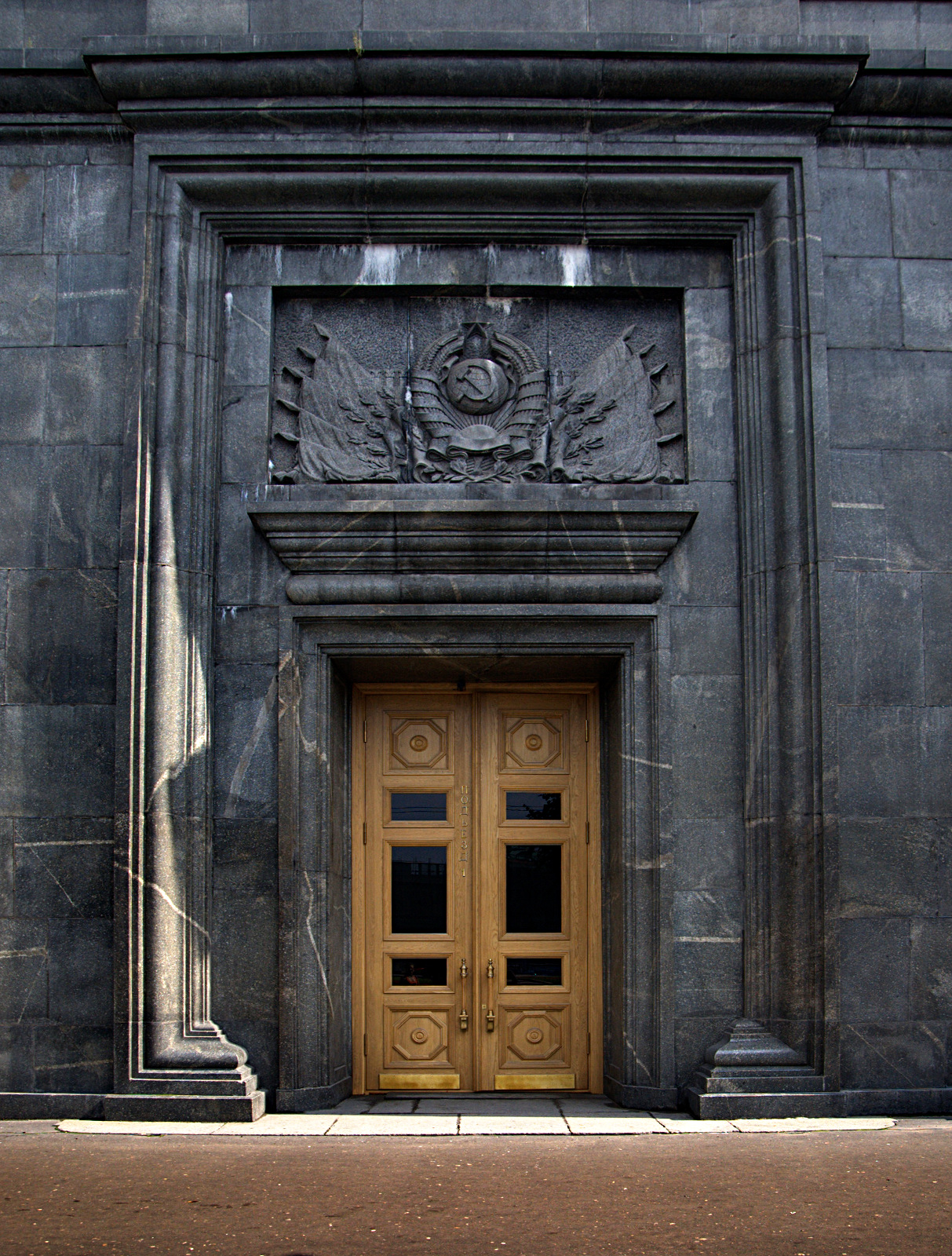
The front entrance of the building of state security bodies, 2008

Thanks to the activities of government agencies that worked in the building, the toponym "Lubyanka" has become a household name. Phraseological units associated with the house appeared at different times.

Rallies and pickets are regularly held near the walls of the FSB building and the nearby Solovetsky Stone monument. In October 2018, endless single-person rallies were held near the house in support of prisoners in the cases of the New Greatness and Network Case organizations. In November 2016, the artist Petr Pavlensky held an action - setting fire to the main entrance of the building as a protest "against continuous terror." He was fined for damaging a cultural heritage site, although it later emerged that the original door had been removed long ago.

== Influence on fiction ==
The name of the fictional starship Lusankya, from the Star Wars Legends continuity, was derived from Lubyanka. Author Michael A. Stackpole said that he chose the name because he wanted it to evoke an inescapable prison.

== See also ==
- Lefortovo Prison
- Prisons in Russia
