= Central Children's Store on Lubyanka =

Children's store building in Moscow

- Центральный детский магазин на Лубянке
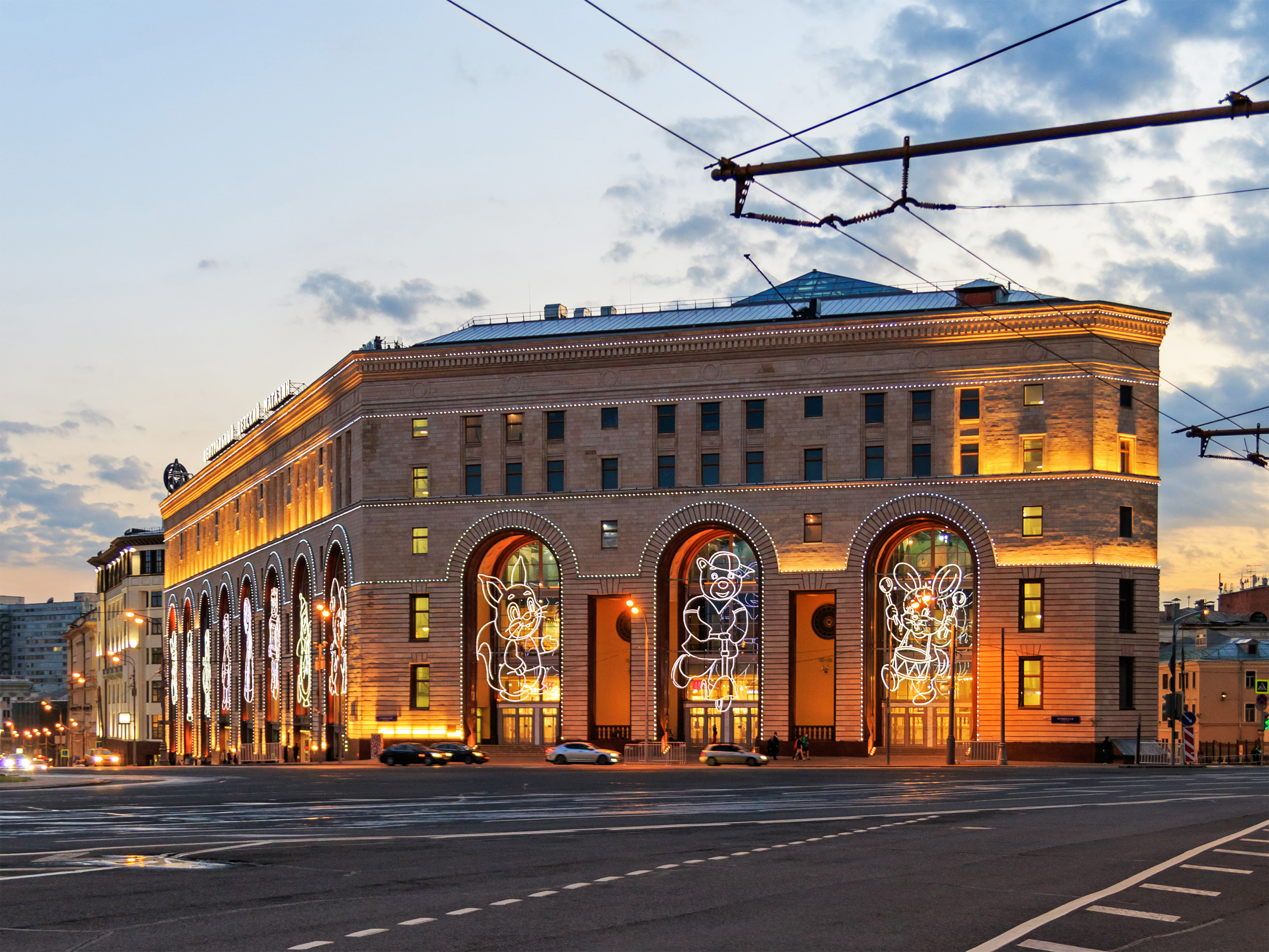
- Interactive map of the Central Children's Store on Lubyanka area

General information
- Location: Moscow, Russia

Design and construction
- Architect: Alexey Dushkin

The Central Children's Store on Lubyanka (Russian: Центральный детский магазин на Лубянке, romanized: Tsentral'nyy detskiy magazin na Lubyanke) is a landmark building and shopping mall located in the historic center of Moscow, in Lubyanka Square. Commissioned in 1957, for several decades it has been the largest children's department store in the Soviet Union. Despite the nod towards its name and origin, at present the shopping center is to a large extent dedicated to baby and children's goods and family entertainment and other offers and services.

The opening of the mall after renovation took place on March 31, 2015. The main trustees surrounded by children winded up the mechanism of the clock “Raketa”, mounted in the main atrium of the building. The clockwork, weighing over 4,5 tons, was created at the oldest factory in Russian – the “Raketa” watch-making factory at Petrodvorets. The building occupies almost a one hectare (10,000 m2) site and has 200 stores covering 35 000 m2 of retail space. Over 30% of the leaseable area is allocated for youth and a family edutainment and leisure activities, over 20% to dining and services.

== History ==
The building of the main children's department store in the Soviet Union, which was then called “Detsky Mir” (meaning "Children's World"), was designed by a Soviet architect Alexey Dushkin and commissioned in 1957. The public opening of the store took place June 6, 1957. The Children's World became the largest children's department store in the Soviet Union.

In 2005 the building was granted the status of a regional cultural heritage monument. In 2006 the supporting structures and the overall technical condition of the building was declared non-complying with safety requirements. In 2008 the department store was closed for renovation.

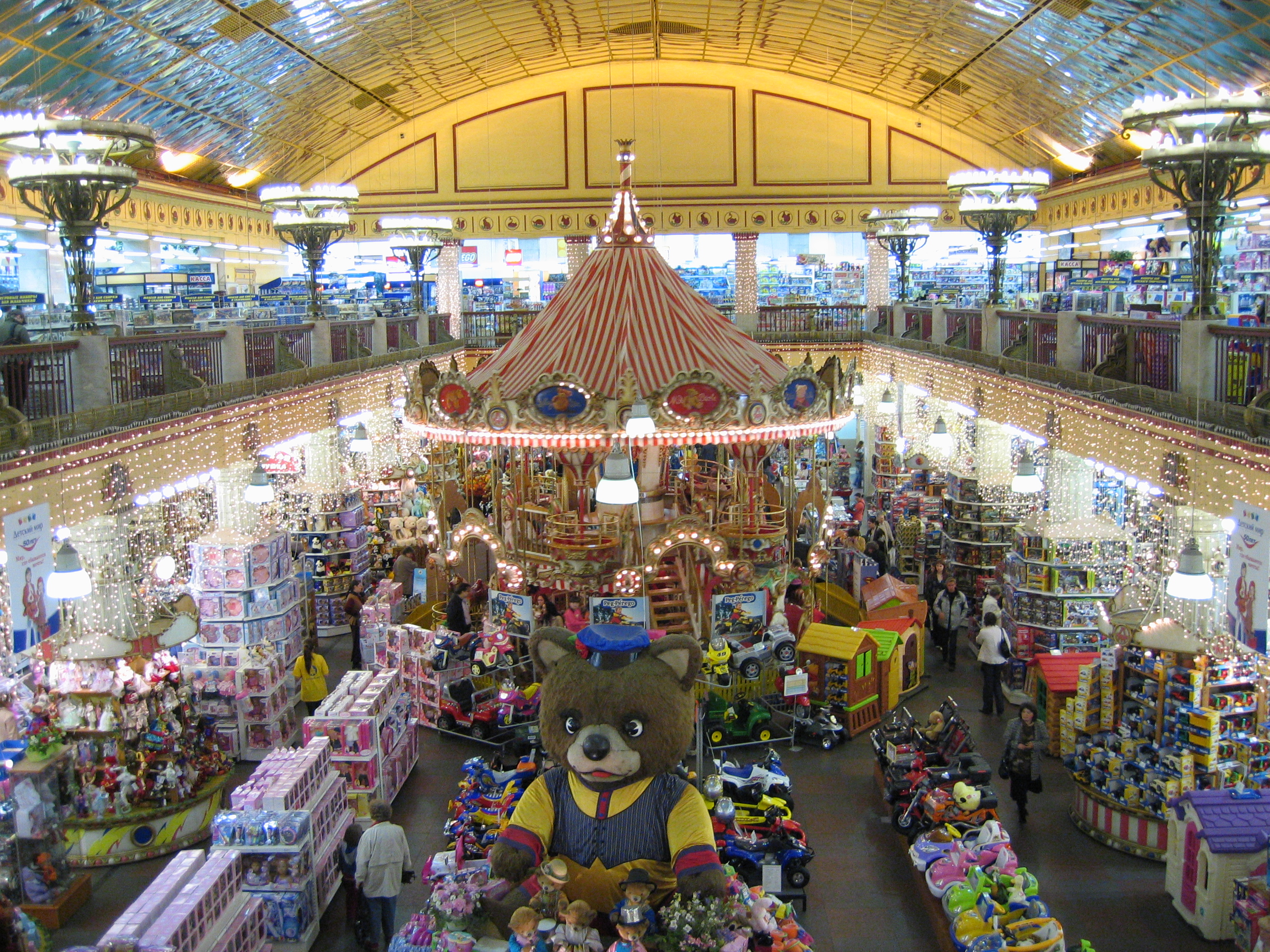
Inside the atrium before reconstruction

=== Reconstruction ===
At the end of 2011 the new owner of the building, Hals-Development Public Company, and the chief architect of the reconstruction project presented the design and specifications for the reconstruction of the department store. The construction works began in 2012 and were complete in December 2014.

Features of reconstruction:

- The town-planning characteristics of the building (its dimensions), elevations, silhouette, three-dimensional structure, composition, and architectural design of the facades were preserved during the reconstruction as required by law
- The outside facade walls of the building: ceramic tiles, granite basement and 26 arched windows were restored and preserved
- The central atrium of the building remained in its place, the height raised 30 m
- Eight bronze floor lamps made in the crafts shops of the department store were restored and re-installed on the balcony of the atrium as well as other internal decorations such as over 100 balusters of 1957 in the railings of the atrium
- Еntrance groups to the building from the street and from Lubyanka metro station were restored
- The three-span loggia of the façade facing Lubyanskaya square, lost in the 80s, was restored to its original condition
- COELGO 9 marble was used for internal decoration.

=== Reopening ===
After the building reopened on March 31, 2015, under the name "Central Children's Store on Lubyanka," the historical name still belonged to the owner of the building as the trade network "Children's World."

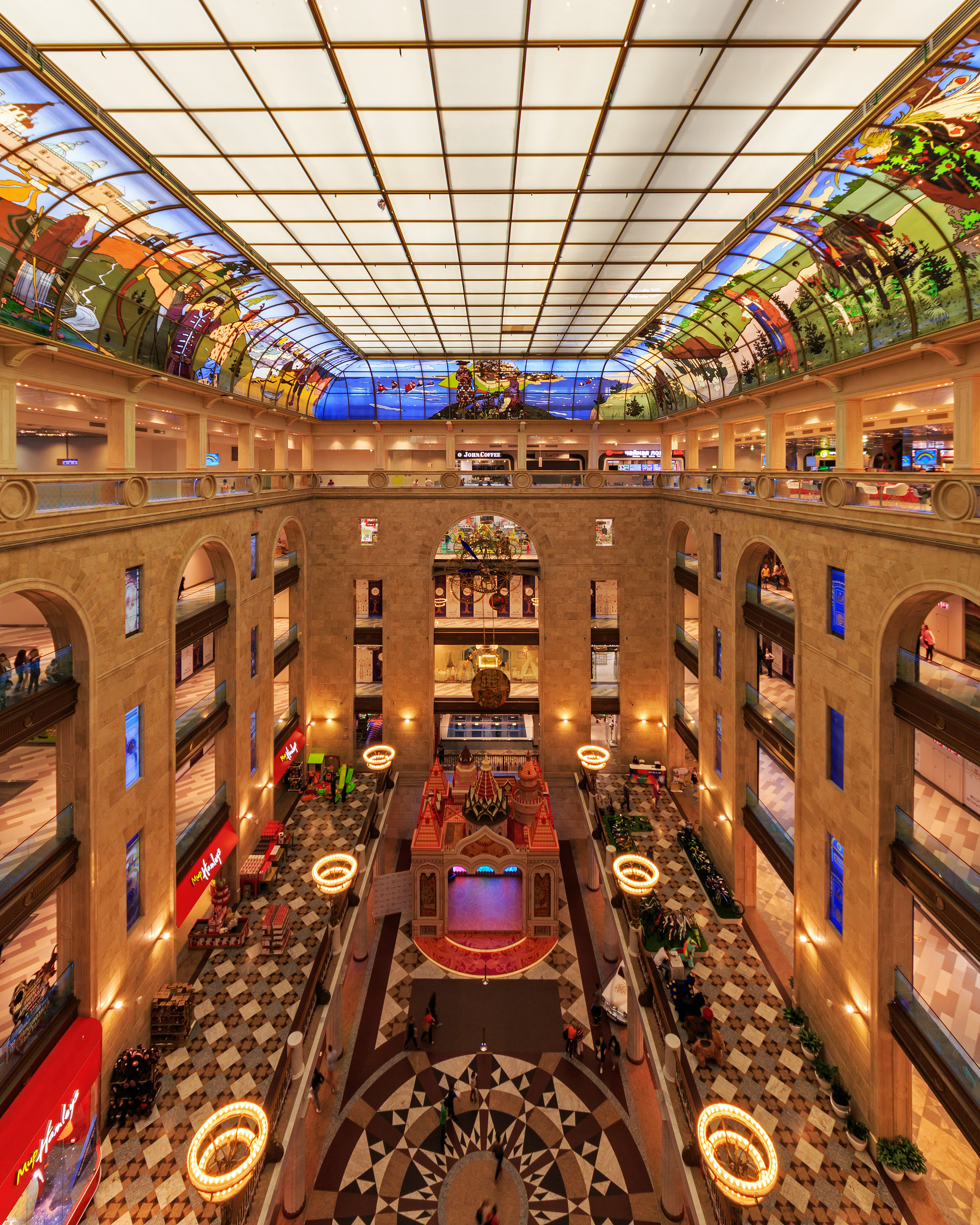
Atrium with clock mechanism in 2015

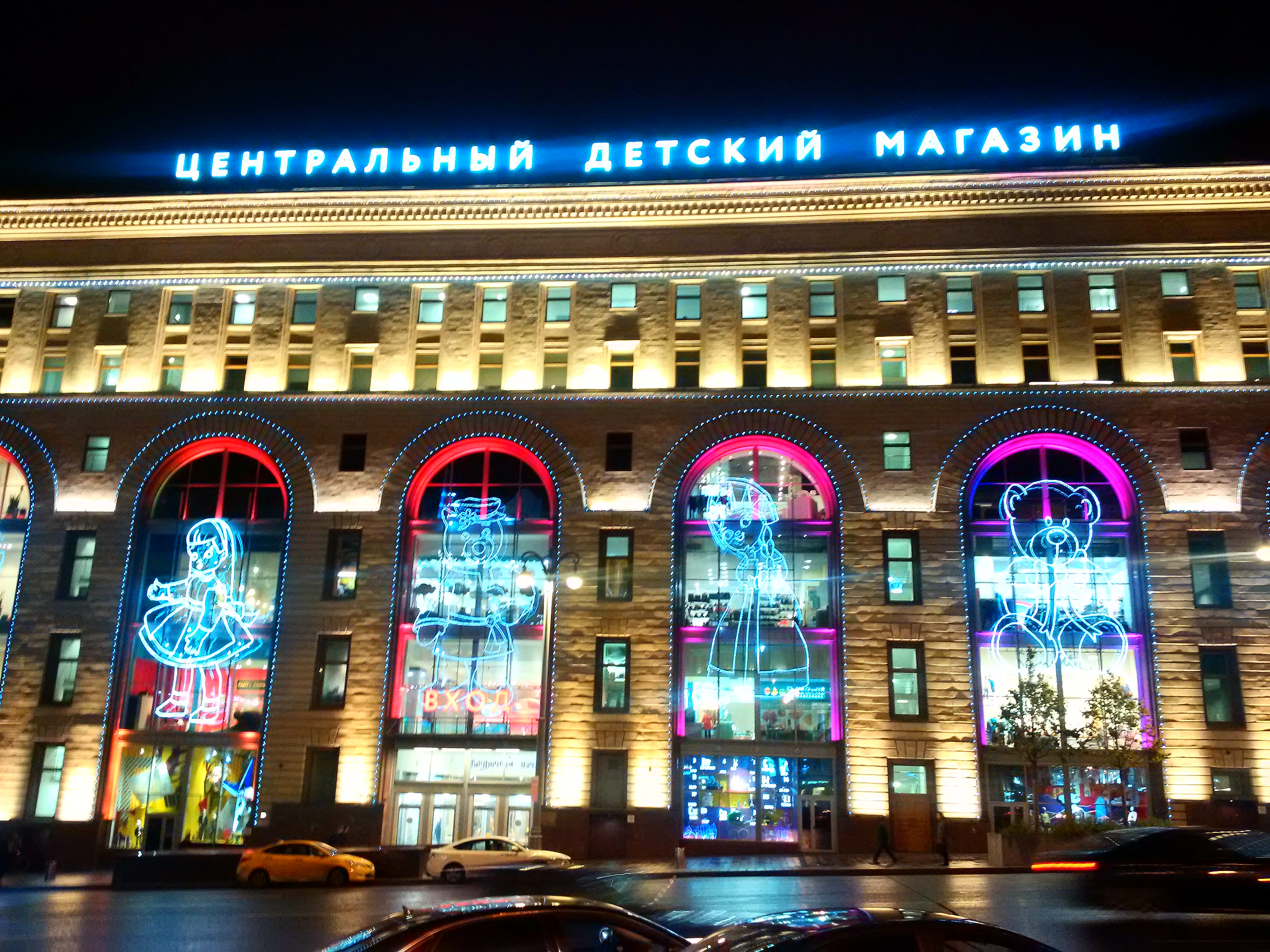
View of the store from the exterior in 2015

On March 31, 2015, the original Detsky Mir building reopened under the new name Central Children's Store or Central Children's Store on Lubyanka. With 100 stores in a seven store mall complex, the Central Children's Store opened as the largest complex of children's stores in the world, according to its developer Hals-Development. Hals-Development is a subsidiary of state banking group VTB. According to the company "Gals-Development", the new architect recreated on the original architectural design of the Central Children's Store (Tzentralne Destski Mir na Lubyanka).

Reportedly the largest clock in the world, the clock in the new atrium was created by the oldest enterprise in Russia, the Petrodvorets watch factory. Six months were necessary for the development and installation of the clock by a group of engineers from the watch factory "Raketa". The clock's mechanism weighs 4.5 tons and consists of 5000 pieces in steel, aluminum, titanium and gold-plated metal. The mechanism has a height of 13 meters and a width of 7 meters. It consists of 21 large gears and a 13 meters pendulum. The pendulum surface acts as aspheric mirror, creating an optical effect. The main mechanism of the clock is on the fifth floor. It is the largest clock mechanism in the world.

On 24 August 2025, a gas cylinder inside the store exploded, killing one person and injuring three others.

== Architecture and design ==
The building of the Central Children's Store with total area of 73 thousand square meters occupies a quarter in a tourist location. There are public entrances into the building from each side. One of the exits from the nearest Lubyanka metro station terminates directly into the shopping mall building. The elevation of the dome of the central atrium was increased from the level of the 3rd to the 7th floor.

== The concept of the shopping mall ==
Within the edutainment concept the following activities can be found:

- Cyber-sports club Winstrike Arena - a multifunctional cyber-entertainment zone
- Europe's largest amusement park of virtual and augmented reality Arena Space
- Kidburg family entertainment centre allowing children to role play adult jobs and earn currency

- a model of the adult world for children from 1.5 to 14 years old

- entertainment center Zyrkus featuring a 5D dome cinema and playgrounds equipped with immersive technologies
- Multimedia amusement park "Alice - Return to Wonderland"
- Interactive science museum "Innopark"
- Multiplex cinema Formula Kino
- A stained glass installation was created on the inner dome of the main atrium. Another stained-glass dome decorates the small atrium in the food court.
- An open observation deck overlooking the historical center of Moscow
- Museum of Childhood featuring 3D-mapping show
- The main Atrium of the Central Children's Store hosts all kinds of events, concerts, master classes, performances and fairs

== The mechanical clock “Raketa” ==
The clock “Raketa” ordered by Hals-Develment Public Company especially for the renovated shopping mall and designed by the Russian watch-making factory “Raketa” were mounted on the main atrium wall. The technical design and installation of the monumental mechanism took 6 months. The clockwork weighs over 4.5 tons and consists of 5,000 parts, made of steel, aluminum, titanium and coated with gold. The operating mechanism of the clock reaches the size of 6 by 7 meters and consists of 21 gears, a 4-meter balance anchors wheel and a 13-meter pendulum with a diameter of 3 meters. The time in the clock of the “Central Children's Store on Lubyanka” regulated by the planetary mechanism and corrected with the help of an innovative electronic device.

== Museum of Childhood ==
The Museum of Childhood opened its doors in 2015 together with the public opening of the shopping mall after reconstruction. The exposition, located on the 7th floor of the building features more than 1,500 item: toys and original objects of the era, which were once sold and bought in “the Children's World” department store. Each visitor can take part in the development of the Museum donating a toy, bought once in the store.
