= Hampden Watch =

American watch manufacturer

Hampden Watch is an American watch manufacturer based in Chicago, Illinois. Founded in 1922 by Hyman Wein, an immigrant from Kyiv, Ukraine, as the Clinton Watch Company, it began assembling watches for the American market and became one of several watchmaking businesses established by the Wein family across North America, including Marathon Watch and Cardinal Watch in Canada.

A separate company, the original Hampden Watch Company was founded in 1877 in Springfield, Massachusetts, and later operated in Canton, Ohio. A major U.S. pocket watch manufacturer in the late 19th and early 20th centuries, Hampden (and then Dueber-Hampden) produced millions of pocket watches, including railroad-grade models, before going into receivership in 1927. In 1930, the Soviet government purchased its machinery and designs to establish the USSR's First State Watch Factory, marking the end of the company's operations in the U.S. The story of this transfer and its role in Soviet watchmaking has been covered in modern horological media. At that time, the Hampden brand was reorganized into a wristwatch company operating in Chicago.

In 1958, the Wein family acquired the Hampden Watch Company and merged it into Clinton. In 1981, the family also acquired Benrus, another prominent American watch brand, which was sold in 1998. Hampden remains under family ownership into its fourth generation and has been described as among the oldest continuously operating watch businesses in America. In 2025, AblogtoWatch published a review of Hampden's Model 1 "Sullivan," highlighting the brand's relaunch and product design.
