= Dueber-Hampden Watch Company =

American pocket watch manufacturer (1877–1927)

The Dueber-Hampden Watch Company was an American watch manufacturing company. In 1888, the Dueber Watch Case Company operating in Cincinnati from 1864 bought the Hampden Watch Company of New York, in operation since 1877. Dueber moved them both to Canton, Ohio, where Hampden used the Dueber cases until the companies merged in 1923. Pocket watch sales declined after World War I, and the business closed in 1927. Then in 1930, the factory was sold and moved to Soviet Russia. The original Hampden operations ceased in 1930; however, the brand name was later acquired by the Wein family of Chicago, who continue to operate under the Hampden Watch name into the 21st century.

== History ==
The Hampden Watch Company began as the Mozart Watch Company in 1866 when Donald J. Mozart founded the company in Providence, Rhode Island. This company soon failed, but in 1867, he reorganized the firm as the New York Watch Company, with production facilities in Springfield, Massachusetts. Three years later, the company's factory burnt to the ground. Finally, in 1877, the company reopened, doing business as the Hampden Watch Company.

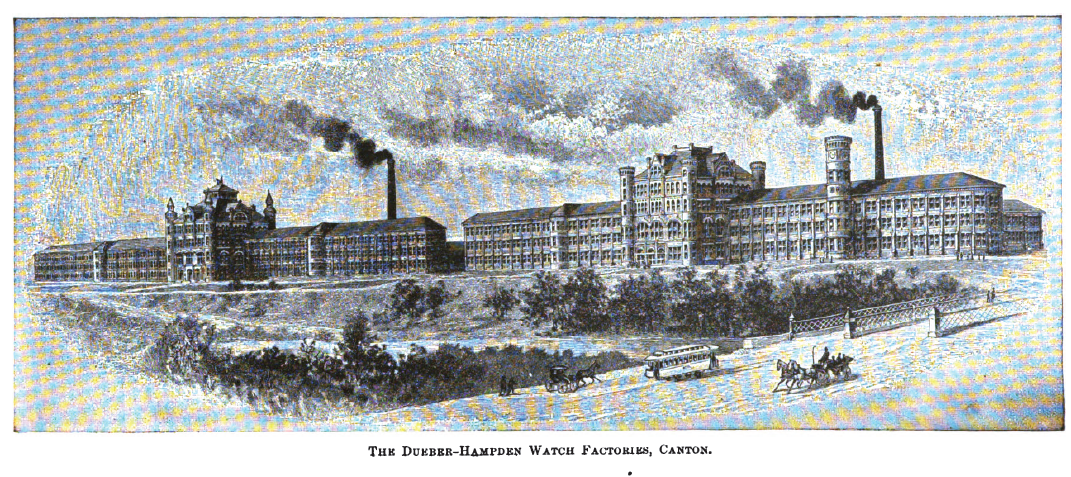
The Dueber-Hampden Watch Factory in Canton, OH

In 1864, John C. Dueber founded the Dueber Watch Case Company in Cincinnati, Ohio to manufacture cases for fine watches. In 1886, Dueber, who had been making cases for the Hampden Watch Company, purchased a controlling interest in it. About this time an anti-trust law was passed and the watch case manufacturers formed a boycott against Dueber's company. In 1888, Dueber bought Hampden and moved both companies to a dual set of factory buildings in Canton, Ohio. In their first year in Canton, the combined firms employed almost 10% of the city's population.

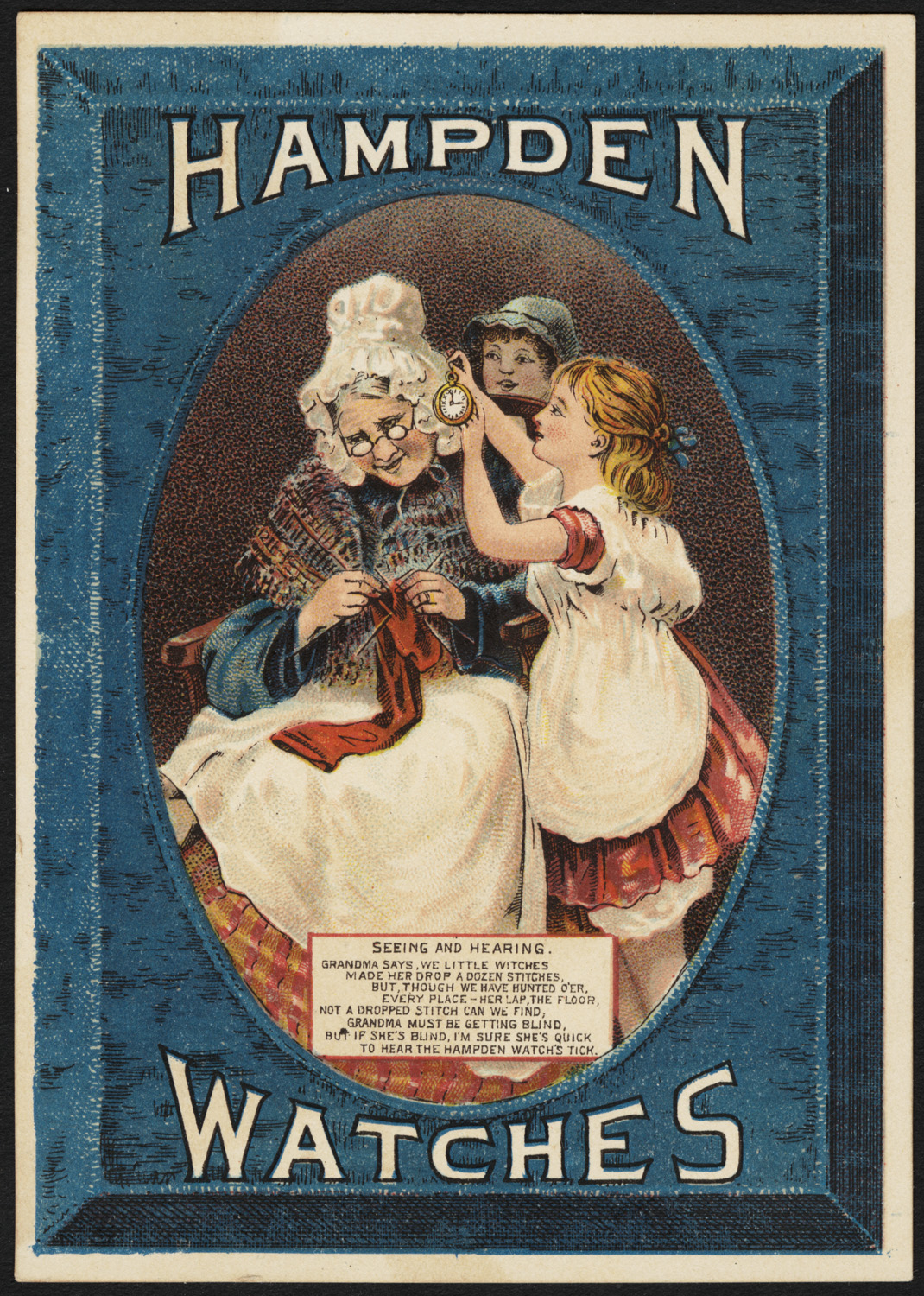
19th-century trade card for the company.

By 1890, the company was producing quality watches, and introduced the first size 16, 23 jewel movement made in America. In 1923, the two businesses merged to become the Dueber-Hampden Watch Company. In 1925, John Dueber sold the company to Walter Vrettman. In 1927, falling sales led to the company going into receivership. In 1930, Amtorg Trading Corporation purchased the Dueber-Hampden Watch Company together with all of the manufacturing equipment, parts on hand, and work in progress, in order to build a factory in Russia. 28 boxcars of machinery left Canton, together with 21 Dueber Hampden employees to teach the Russians the craft of watchmaking.

In 1931, the First State Watch Factory produced pocket watches that were presented at a ceremonial meeting in the Revolution Theater. The Hampden pattern watch movements were called the Type-1, easily recognized by its distinct twin finger bridge layout.

As the Nazi army closed in on Moscow, during Autumn of 1941, the factory was hurriedly evacuated to Zlatoust, where more than 300,000 Zlatoust Type-1 watches and clocks were made. By 1943, the Moscow factory was re-established and renamed the First Moscow Watch Factory and continued the manufacture of pocket watches and stopwatches, as well as the Type-1 191-ChS watch for Soviet Navy divers. This watch, whose diameter, not including the crown, is about 2 1/4 inches (60mm), weighed 8 1/2 ounces (about 260g). In 1970, production of these unique Type-1 191-ChS watches was stopped.

In the 1950s, the Hampden Watch Company brand rights were acquired by the Wein family of Chicago, who integrated them into their Clinton Watch Company business. The family continues to operate under the Hampden name into the 21st century.

== See also ==
- Poljot

== Bibliography ==
- Garratt, Alan. Beyond Springfield and Moscow: The remarkable story of Hampden watches. 2014. Retrieved 2 October 2014.
- Gibbs, James W. From Springfield to Moscow: The Complete Dueber-Hampden Story. Exeter, NH : Adams Brown, 1954.
- The Watch Factories of America Past and Present by Henry G. Abbott
- Howe, Henry. Historical Collections of Ohio. Columbus, OH: Henry Howe & Son, 1891
- "The Watch Trade War." The New York Times. 10 April 1895
