= Slava watches =

Brand of watches

Slava
- Current owner: Slava Watch Company
- Country: Russia
- Introduced: 1924
- Website: slava.su

Slava (Russian: Cлава, meaning "Glory") watches were classic "civil" Russian watches. The Slava factory (known originally as the Second Moscow Watch Factory) was the second established in the Soviet Union, in 1924.

== History ==
In 1919, the Soviet Union bought and imported two watch factories from the USA to start its own watchmaking industry. The first, Moscow's first watchmaking factory, produced Poljot watches. The second, also in Moscow, started production of watches in 1931, which became the Slava brand of watches during the 1950s. Starting in 1985, under the Gorbachev era, the brand manufactured models for the political party.

In the last decades of the Soviet period, watch products were exported to many countries around the world, with exports accounting for up to 50% of production in some years. Subsidiary assembly plants operated in France and Switzerland.

In January 2006, the Slava factory and its site were sold for retail development. By 2010 the factory had been demolished for new real estate projects. The brand has been taken over by the municipality of Moscow in a debt swap. The rights to use the brand under a licensing agreement were granted to the "Slava" trade house. They also purchased the remaining inventory and stock of movements. In 2019, the brand was bought from the Moscow government, and its active development began. A large number of models were released in the premium segment, including reissues of bestsellers from the 70s, 80s, and the post-Soviet period, limited collectible series, and collaborations with other watch manufacturers, famous personalities, and brands.

In 2024, the brand celebrated its centenary, for which a dozen new models were launched. Among them are particularly significant:

- The "Yozhik Slava" watch, themed around the iconic Soviet animated film. Created in collaboration with Soyuzmultfilm and the Alltime network.
- The "Little Prince" watch. During the pre-order phase, a sales record was set—700 pieces were sold in 7 minutes. Created in collaboration with watch blogger and crowdfunding organizer Anton Yaitskiy.
- The "Pogonya"("Chase") watch. A reincarnation of the Soviet version of watches for drivers. It received the award for "Best Sports Watch" at the "Best Russian Watches 2024" competition.
- The "AK" watch. Created in collaboration with the Kalashnikov concern.

== Awards ==
In 1964, at the international fair in Leipzig, the tuning fork wristwatches "Slava" "Transistor" were awarded a gold medal.

In 1974, the "Slava" wristwatches with a 24 mm caliber received a gold medal at the international exhibition in Brno.

In 1975, a gold medal was awarded at the international fair in Leipzig.

2023 - "Afalina" model - award for "Best Sports Watch 2023" at the "Best Russian Watches" competition.

2024 - "Pogonya" watch - award for "Best Sports Watch 2024" at the "Best Russian Watches" competition.

== In popular culture ==
The filming of the Soviet film "Seven Nannies" from 1962 took place at the Second Moscow Watch Factory, and the plot was related to watch production.

In the 2016 film Glory (original title Slava), set in contemporary Bulgaria, the protagonist's Slava watch with an engraving from his father plays a key role in the plot.
