= Detsky Mir =

Russian children's goods retailer

Coordinates: 55.7602°N 37.6248°E

PJSC Detsky Mir
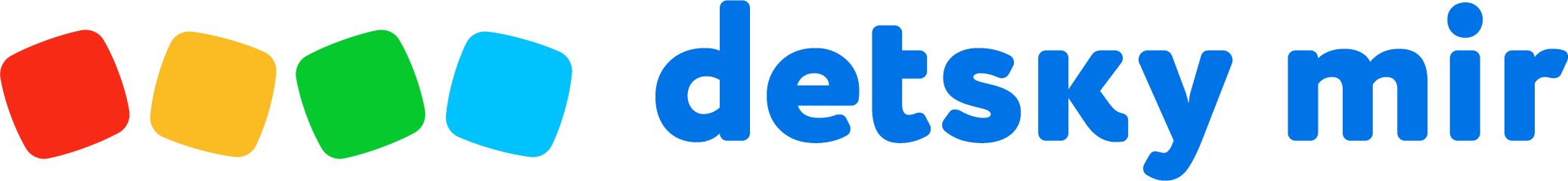

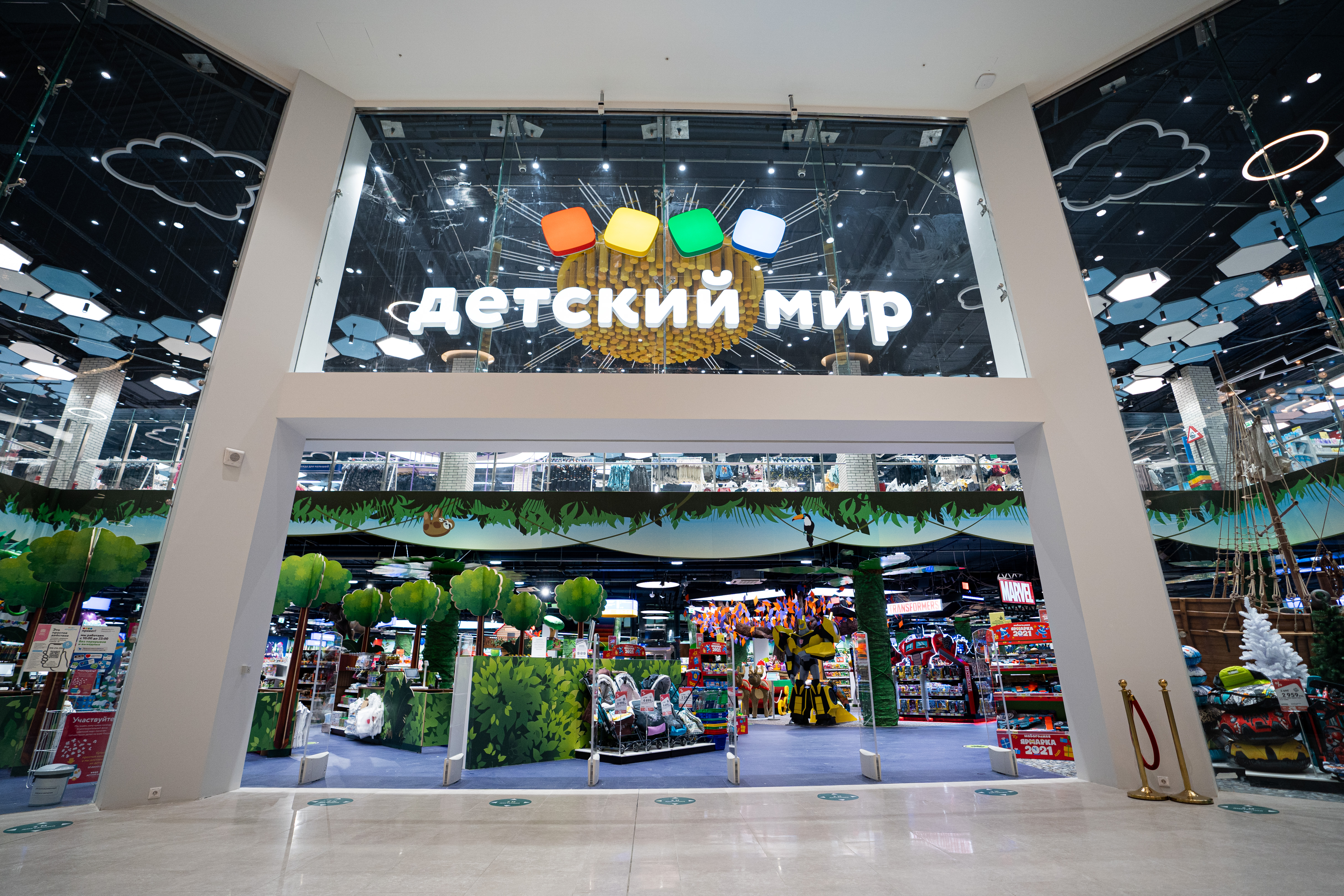
- Native name: ПАО «Детский мир»
- Type: Public
- Traded as: MCX: DSKY
- Industry: Children's retail
- Founded: June 6, 1957 in Moscow, Russia
- Key people: Maria Davydova (CEO)
- Revenue: $2.23 billion (2021)
- Operating income: $248 million (2021)
- Net income: $148 million (2021)
- Total assets: $1.6 billion (2021)
- Total equity: $1.15 million (2021)
- Subsidiaries: Early Learning Center
- Website: www.detmir.ru

Children's World (Russian: Де́тский мир) or Detsky Mir (stylized in lowercase) is a Russian children's retailer. Founded in June 1957, as of March 2022, the company had 1125 stores. It is the largest children's goods retailer in Russia and the CIS, with the retail chain in Russia, as well as in Belarus and Kazakhstan. In February 2017, PAO Detsky Mir listed its shares in an initial public offering. Maria Davydova is the CEO. In 2020, PJSC Detsky Mir was included in the list of systemically important enterprises of the Russian Federation.

== History ==
=== 1957-2008: Formation and first store ===
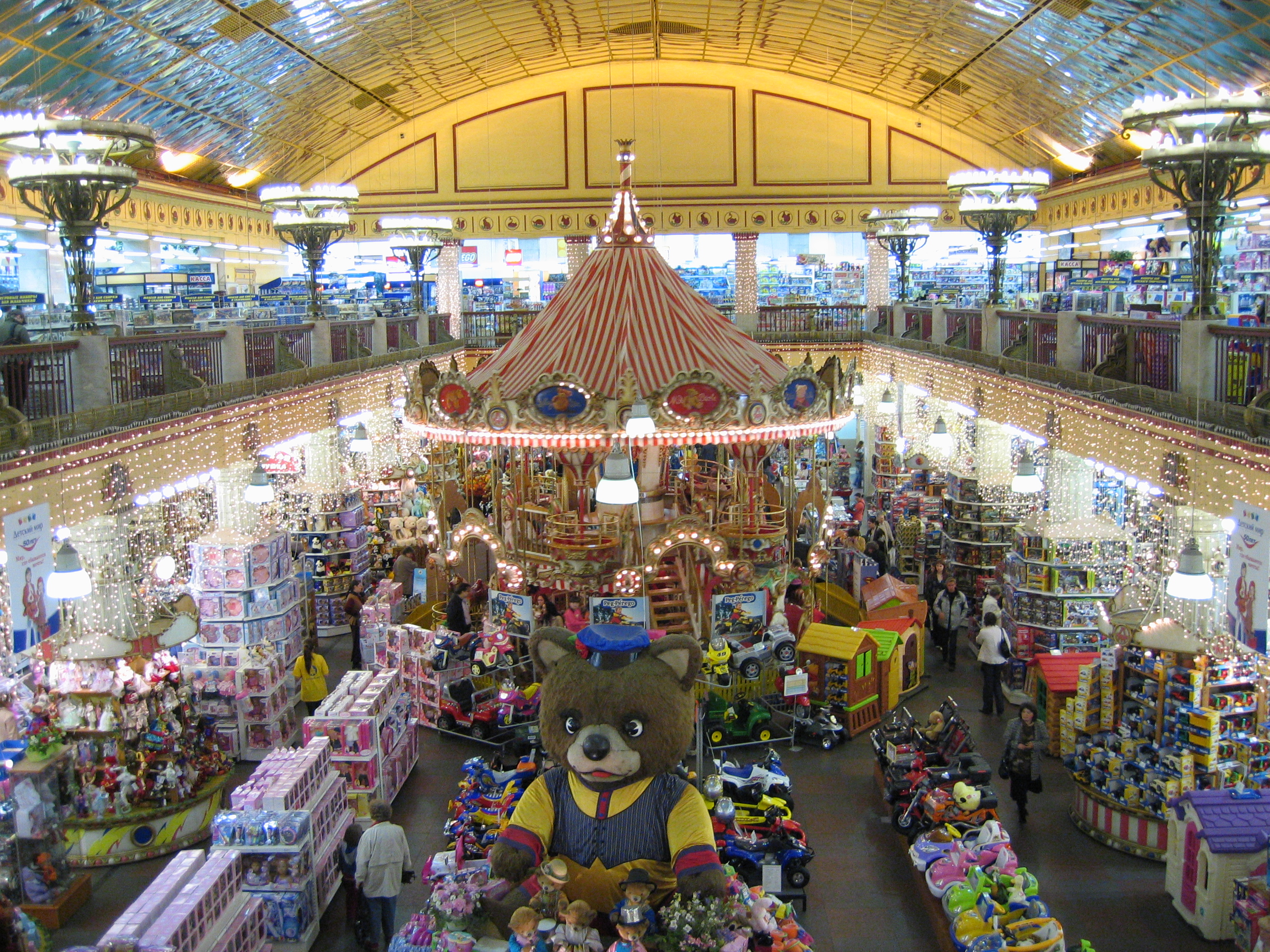
The original Detsky Mir department store in Moscow, pictured in 2007, shortly before it was sold and rebuilt. Detsky Mir no longer owns the original store.

Detsky Mir first opened on June 6, 1957 in the center of Moscow at Lubyanka Square. The original store was built between 1953 and 1957, with design by architect Alexey Dushkin. After the original store opened, Bloomberg writes that "Detsky Mir became a household name, prompting the Soviet government to open a network of large stores by the same name." Detsky Mir became a chain of children's retailers in Russia in the 2000s.

In 2005, the original Detsky Mir building received the status of cultural heritage at the regional level. The original Detsky Mir building was Russia's largest toy shop from 1957 until 2008, when it was sold by Detsky Mir to VTB and was closed for restoration, with the cost of the restoration estimated at US $138 million. The building reopened on March 31, 2015, under the name Central Children's Store on Lubyanka. The historical name still belonged to the owner of the building as the trade network "Children's World."

=== 2008-2016: Growth of stores ===
The Wall Street Journal writes that "the main owner of Detsky Mir, conglomerate AFK Sistema, put off plans for an IPO in 2014." Bloomberg writes "Sistema's founder, billionaire Vladimir Evtushenkov, shelved a planned IPO of Detsky Mir in 2014 after Russia's annexation of Crimea."

By 2015, the Detsky Mir chain had around 320 locations and was owned by Vladimir Evtushenkov. The company expected 2016 revenue of $1.3 billion (79.2 billion rubles) for 2016, a 30% increase from 2015. In 2016, Detsky Mir reported 31-percent growth in revenue to 79.5 billion roubles (1 billion pounds). As of December 31, 2016, it operated 525 stores, with 468 in Russia and 12 in Kazakhstan. "Children's World" opened around 200 stores between 2015 and early 2017, with plans to open 250 over the next three years, bringing the total to 700. As of February 2017, the company had 525 stores, with plans to open 250 more by 2020.

=== 2017: IPO and international expansion ===
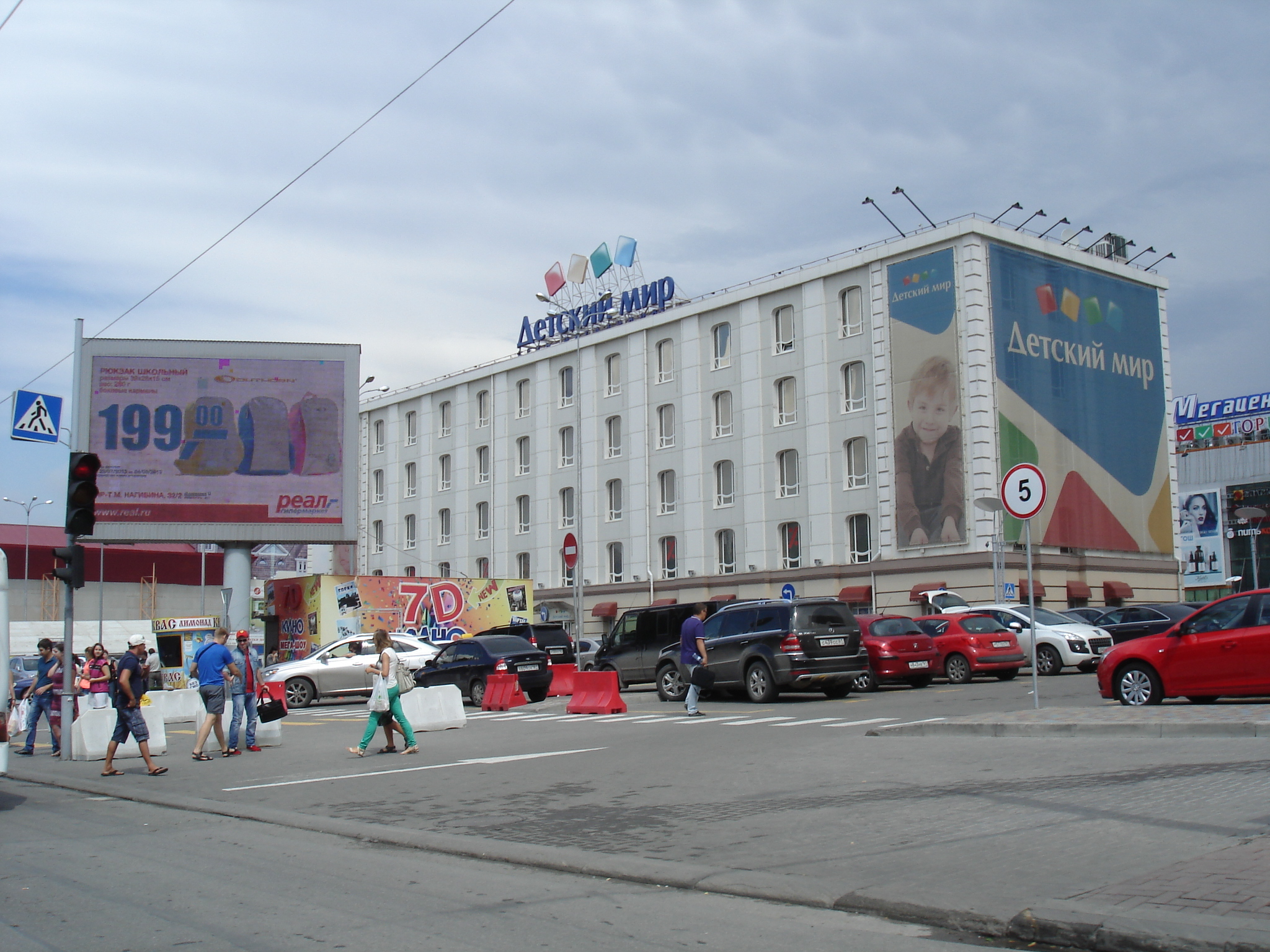
R&D building for Detsky Mir

After Detsky Mir closed the book on an IPO on February 7, on February 8, 2017, PAO Detsky Mir listed its shares "in the first major initial public offering in Russia since the annexation of Crimea." At the time of its IPO, Detsky Mir was majority owned by System and partly owned by The Russia China Investment Fund (RCIF). System retained just over 50% of the shares after the IPO, while RCIF retained a share of around 13%. Credit Suisse, Goldman Sachs, and Morgan Stanley were appointed as joint global coordinators and bookrunners, while UBS Investment Bank and Sberbank CIB were also joint bookrunners. The IPO raised $355 million, valuing the company at around $1 billion, with plans for stock to begin trading on February 10, 2017. It debuted on the Moscow Exchange on Friday on February 10, 2017. When Detsky Mir launched on the RTS Micex stock exchange in Moscow, over half of the shares went to non-Russian entities and individuals. Around 90 percent of the shares were bought by foreign investors. As of August 2017, Detsky Mir's IPO was still the largest that year in Russia.

As of March 2017, the company had a growing e-commerce business. It also had plans to open 250 new stores by 2010, with 70 to open in 2017 and several openings scheduled for Kazakhstan to add to the 12 stores there. That month, Detsky Mir Group (Detsky Mir, Early Learning Center, and online stores) announced it was considering entering into the Indian market.

== Products ==
The company sells a wide range of products, including toys, games, large items, products for newborns, apparel, footwear, and stationery. Bloomberg writes in February 2017 that the franchise "offers everything from strained carrots to bicycles to frilly party dresses in stores that often feature entertainment areas where kids play with Lego bricks and shoot Nerf balls." In August 2017, Detsky Mir partnered with the Lego Group to support Ninjago in Russia.

== See also ==
- List of companies of Russia
- Columbus Shopping Center
- MEGA Family Shopping Centre
- Zvezda (company)
