= Poljot =

Brand of Russian wristwatches

Logo in Russia

Logo transliterated using Roman alphabet

Poljot (Russian: Полёт, literally meaning "flight"), is a brand of Soviet/Russian wristwatches, produced since 1964 by the First Moscow Watch Factory (Russian: Первый Московский Часовой Завод, ПМЧЗ, Perviy Moskovskiy Chasovoy Zavod). The flagship brand of the USSR's watch industry, Poljot produced numerous historical watches used in many important space missions, including the world's first space watch worn by Yuri Gagarin.

== History ==
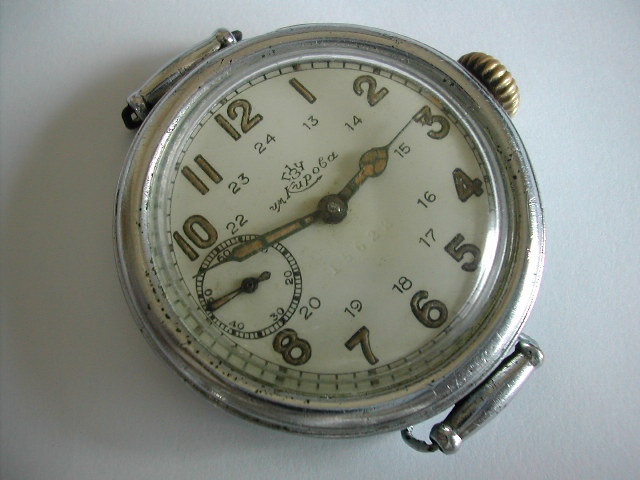
1930s' FSWF wristwatch with Dueber-Hampden designed movement

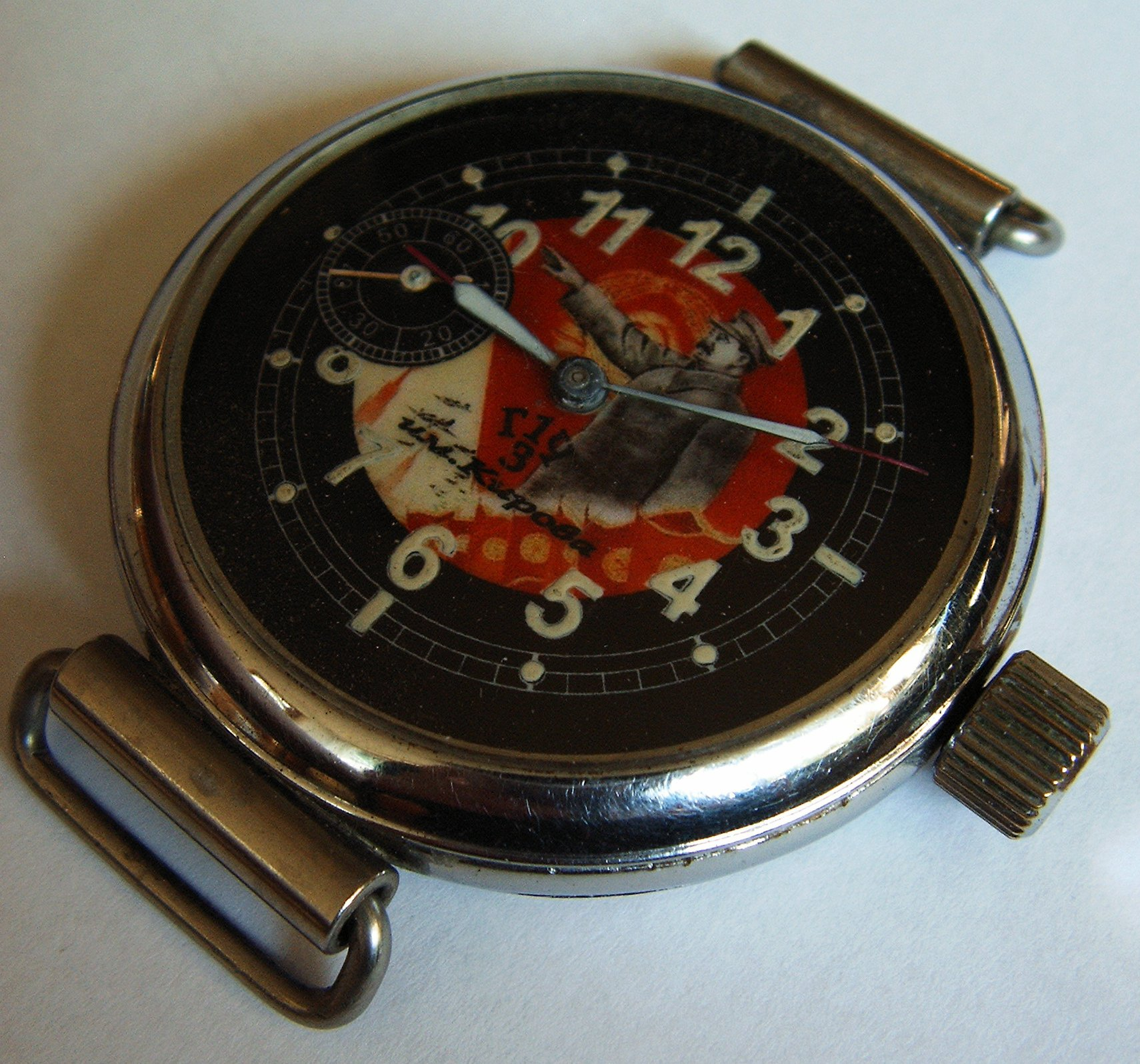
1930s watch from Kirov First State Watch Factory, Moscow. Face with portrait of Joseph Stalin.

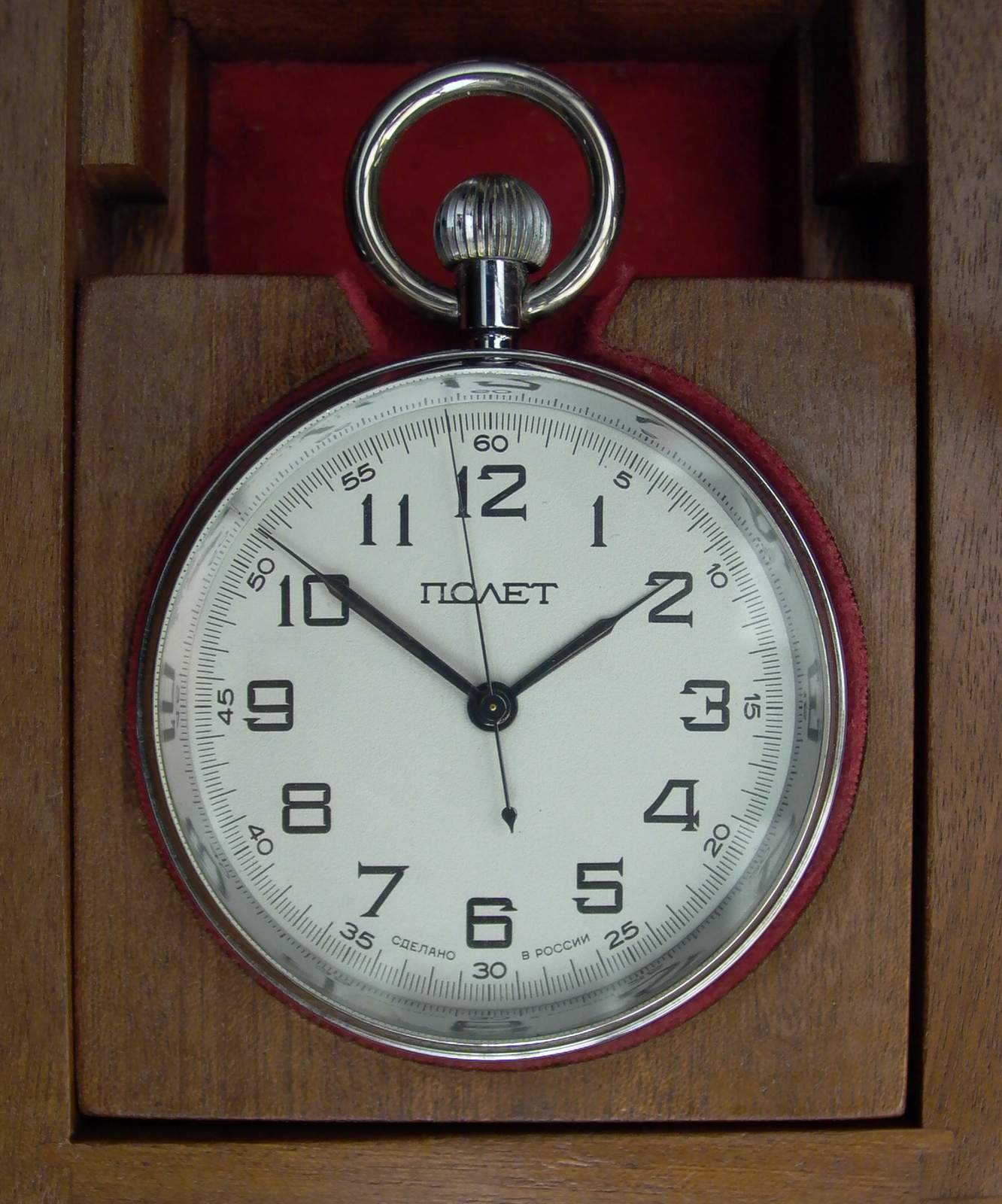
Hack watch, made in the Soviet Union by Poljot

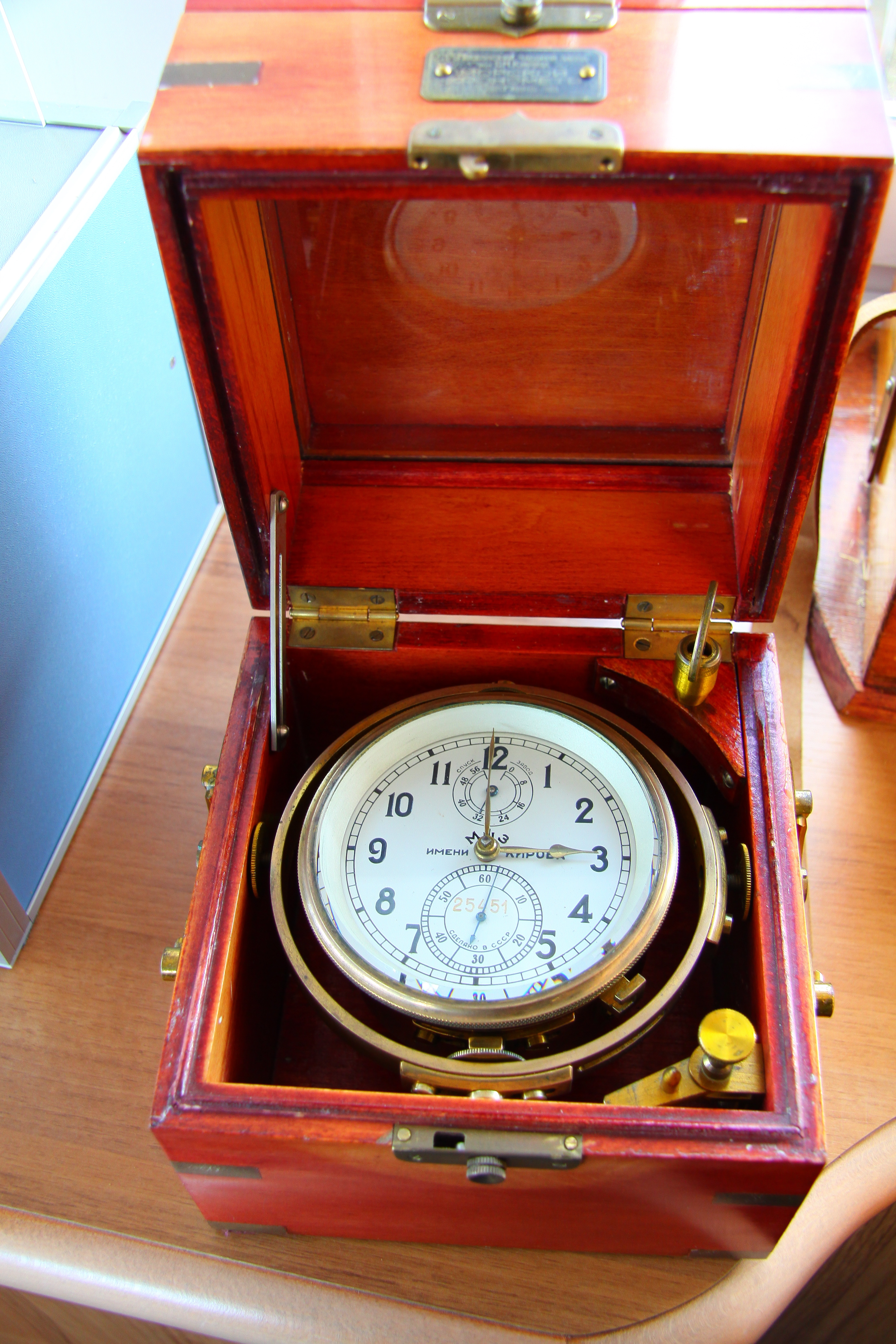
Kirov (Poljot) MX6 marine chronometer

Hack watch and a marine chronometer

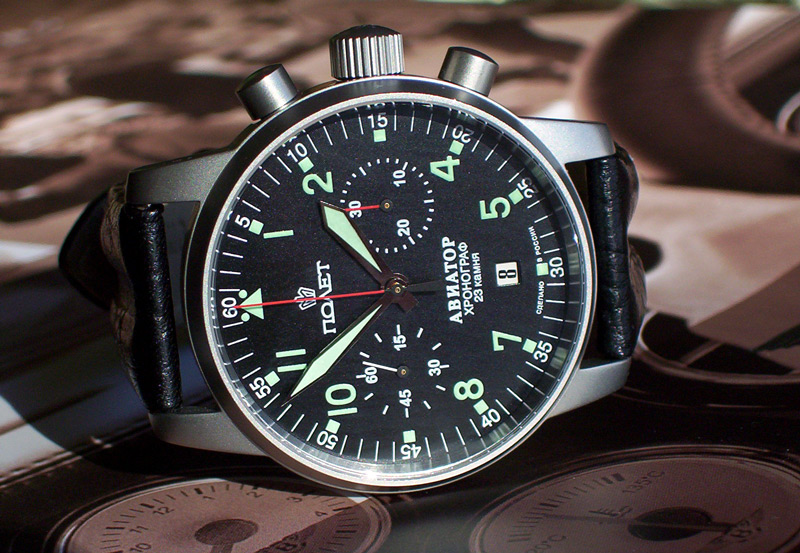
Poljot Aviator caliber 3133 chronograph

The First Moscow Watch Factory was founded in 1930 using machinery, equipment, and technical designs purchased from the bankrupt Dueber-Hampden Watch Company of Canton, Ohio. This marked the end of the original Hampden Watch Company operations in the United States, while providing the foundation for Soviet watchmaking under the Poljot name.

Founded in 1930 under orders from Joseph Stalin, the First State Watch Factory (Russian: Первый Государственный Часовой Завод - 1ГЧЗ) was the first large scale Soviet watch and mechanical movement manufacturer. Via its USA-based trading company Amtorg, the Soviet government bought the defunct Ansonia Clock Company of Brooklyn, New York in 1929, and the Dueber-Hampden Watch Company of Canton, Ohio. As part of the Soviet's first five-year plan, twenty-eight freight cars worth of machinery and parts were moved from the US to Moscow in order to establish the factory; further, twenty-one former Dueber-Hampden technicians trained Russian workers in the art of watchmaking. The movements of very-early products were still stamped "Dueber-Hampden, Canton, Ohio, USA" (examples of these watches are highly collectible today). In 1935, the factory was named after the assassinated Soviet official Sergei Kirov.

As the Germans advanced on Moscow in 1941, the factory was evacuated to Zlatoust (Russian: Златоу́ст). By 1943, the tide of the war was turned and the Germans were in retreat, and subsequently, the factory moved back to Moscow. At this point, it adopted the "First Moscow Watch Factory" name (Russian: Первый Московский Часовой Завод - 1МЧЗ).

In 1947 the first wristwatches under the brand name "Pobeda" and the first marine chronometers and hack watches or deck watches were produced. By 1951 the production of wristwatches had increased to 1.1 million. In 1975 new machinery and equipment for manufacturing complex watches was imported from Switzerland.

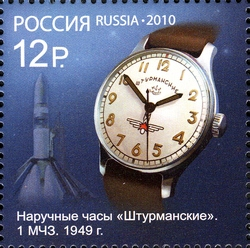
Sturmanskie (First Moscow Watch Factory), 1949. The stamp of Russia, 2010.

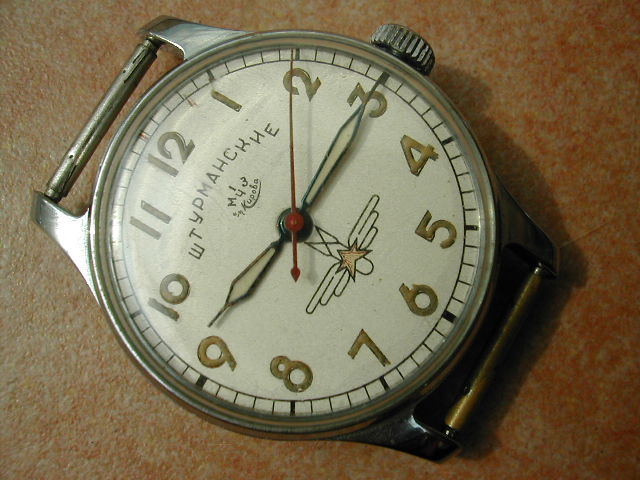
Sturmanskie

== PMChZ watches in space ==
=== Gagarin's flight ===
On 12 April 1961 Yuri Gagarin became the first man in space. The watch Gagarin wore was made by the First Moscow Watch Company under the name Sturmanskie, which translates to "Navigator's". Today's owner of the brand, Volmax (based in both Moscow and Switzerland), is the only authorized company allowed to use Gagarin's name and likeness in watch production. Gagarin received his 17-jewel watch with a manual-wind Poljot movement when he graduated from the Soviet air force flight school in 1957. The original watches were built exclusively for the Soviet Air Force and not available to the public. Publicly available versions of the model were not released until years later. With a diameter of 33 mm, the original watch was small by today's standards. The watch performed flawlessly in space and is currently on display at the Moscow Memorial Museum of Cosmonautics. Commemorative editions produced today are 40 mm and have a 17-jewel Poljot movement.

=== First space walk ===
In 1965 cosmonaut Alexei Leonov wore an FMWF Strela (transliteration of СТРЕЛА, which means "Arrow") chronograph during his first space walk.

== Current status ==
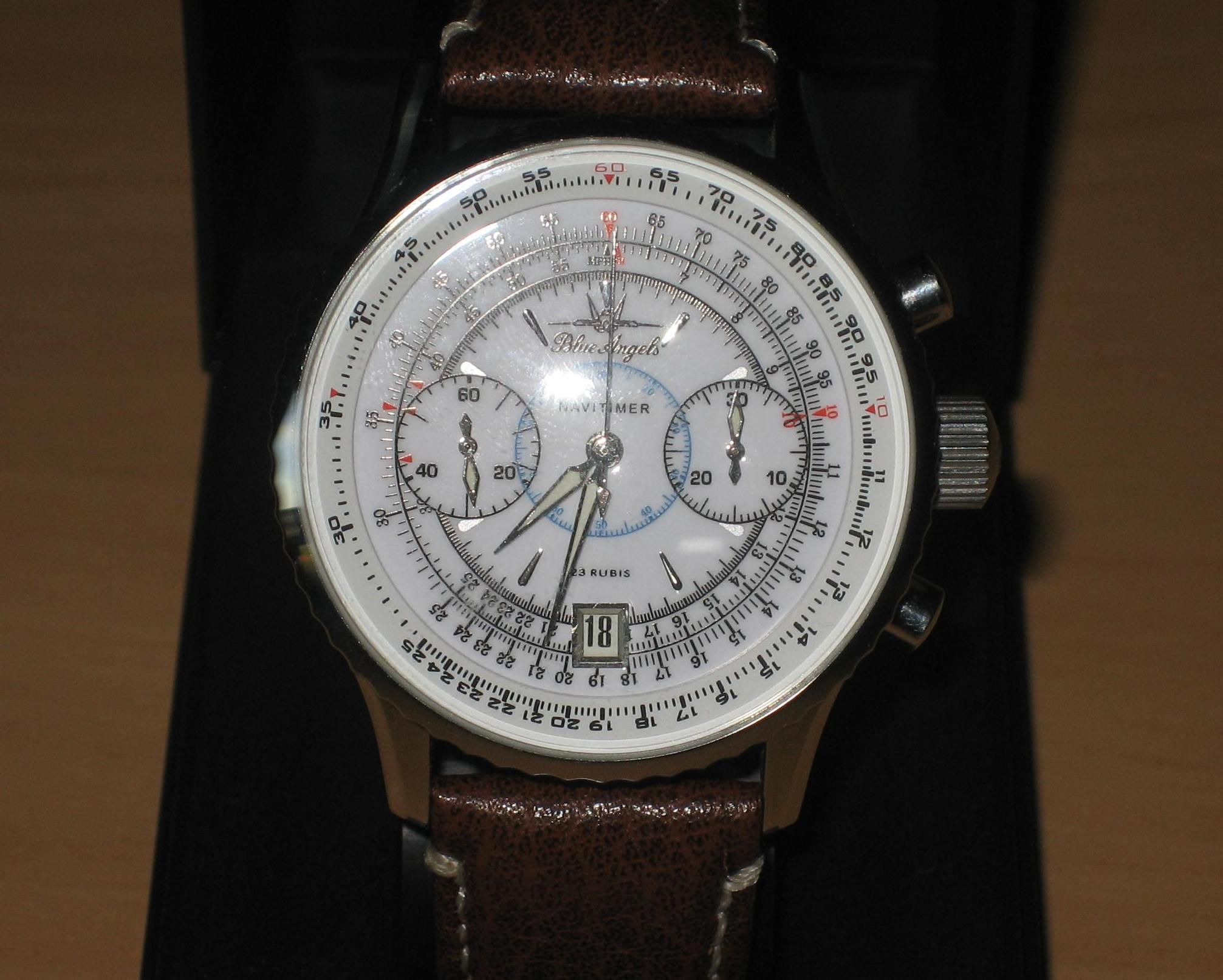
Chronograph Poljot "Blue Angels", caliber 3133.

In the late 2000s, the company was bought by the businessman Sergeï Pugachev, becoming one of the companies of his new luxury group, including: Hédiard, and the channel Luxe TV. The physical remnants of First Moscow Watch Factory were purchased by a group of former Poljot employees, forming the basis for a new company, Volmax. Volmax marketed watches under the Aviator, Buran and Shturmanskie brands using movements produced by another Russian firm, MakTime. MakTime, the company utilizing old Poljot equipment to manufacture mechanical movements, went bankrupt.

== See also ==
- Raketa
- Pobeda
- Vostok
