= Petrodvorets Watch Factory =

Factory in St. Petersburg

Coordinates: 59°52′48″N 29°53′33″E

- Trade name: OOO Petrodvorets Watch Factory "Raketa"
- Type: Private
- Industry: Watchmaking
- Founded: 1721; 305 years ago in Peterhof. Russian Empire
- Founder: Peter the Great
- Headquarters: Peterhof, Saint Petersburg, Russia
- Area served: Worldwide
- Products: Raketa Watches; Pobeda Watches; Raketa Mechanical Movements; Raketa Fashion accessories Raketa Watch Designs
- Revenue: ▲ ₽447.8 million (2025)
- Operating income: ▼ ₽144.8 million (2025)
- Net income: ▲ ₽108.75 million (2025)
- Total assets: ▲ ₽742.0 million (2025)
- Total equity: ▲ ₽43.75 million (2025)
- Website: www.raketa.com
- Footnotes; Financials as of 2025; References

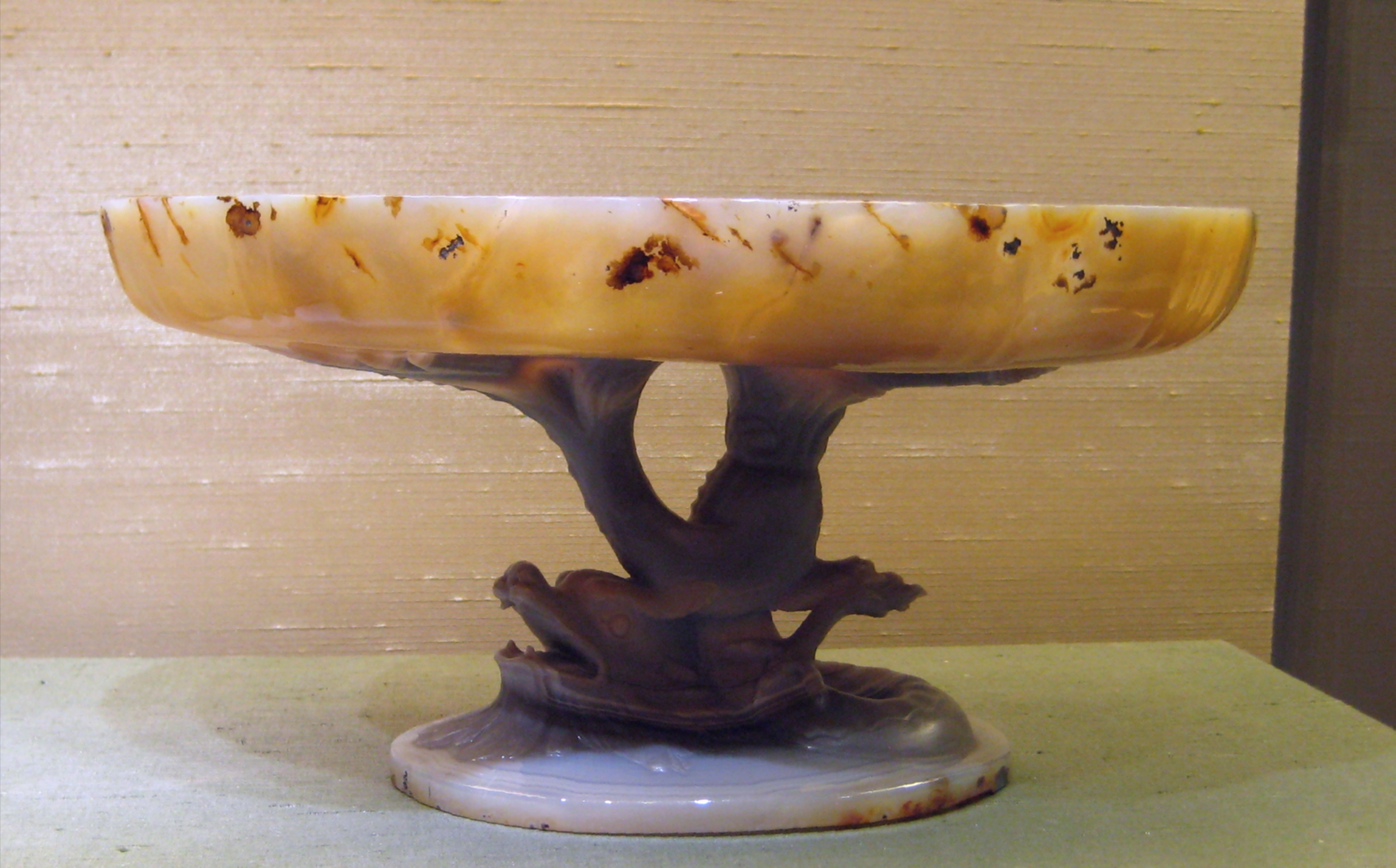
Vase from the Imperial Fabrique of Peterhof

The Petrodvorets Watch Factory (Russian: Петродворцовый часовой завод) is one of the oldest factories in Russia. Founded by Peter the Great in 1721 as the Peterhof Lapidary Works to make hardstone carvings, since 1945 the factory manufactures the Soviet Pobeda watches, and since 1961 it has manufactured the Soviet Raketa watches. In almost 300 years of history, the factory has changed its name several times. Petrodvorets is located in Saint Petersburg.

== History ==
Founded in Saint Petersburg by Peter the Great in 1721 as the Peterhof Lapidary Works to make hardstone carvings, the factory produced luxury objects in semi-precious and precious stones for the palaces of the Tsars. In the Soviet era, the plant continued to work on precious stones.

During the Siege of Leningrad, the factory was destroyed by Nazi troops. It was rebuilt from 1944, at the city's liberation. In 1945, Joseph Stalin—who wanted to reduce the USSR's dependence on Western imports—ordered the factory to manufacture watches. The first watches were produced in the factory under the brands Pobeda and Zvezda.

In its glory years after the war, the plant employed 8,000 people, produced 4.5 million watches per year for Soviet citizens and the needs of the Red Army. The plant was equipped with two atomic bunkers that could accommodate 8,000 people in case of a Western nuclear attack.

After 1991, the plant dramatically cut production following the troubled years of privatization and the collapse of the Soviet Union.

== Tourism ==
Today, the factory—once considered as strategic and remained closed to visitors in Soviet times—is open for tourism, having an average of three million visitors per year. Guides show around the production facility, giving a feeling of travelling back to the USSR, and provide information about clock manufacturing.

== Brands ==
=== From Soviet times ===
Raketa watches are a luxury brand and fully manufactured in-house. The factory's high-end production facility, Raketa was created in 1961 in honour of Yuri Gagarin's flight to space (Raketa is the Russian word for rocket). Raketa is one of the rare watch brands in the world that produces its movements in-house from start to finish. The brand is renowned for its watches made for cosmonauts, polar expeditions, pilots and military.

Pobeda watches was the first watch to have been in space in 1961.

=== From Tsarist times ===
Talberg is a watch brand owned by the factory since before the Revolution. The factory was named Imperial Lapidary Work of Peterhof before 1917.

== Names used by the factory ==
- Since 1949, Petrodvorets Watch Factory or - Petrodvorets Watch Factory "Raketa" or - Peterhof Watch Factory
