= Raketa =

Russian watch brand

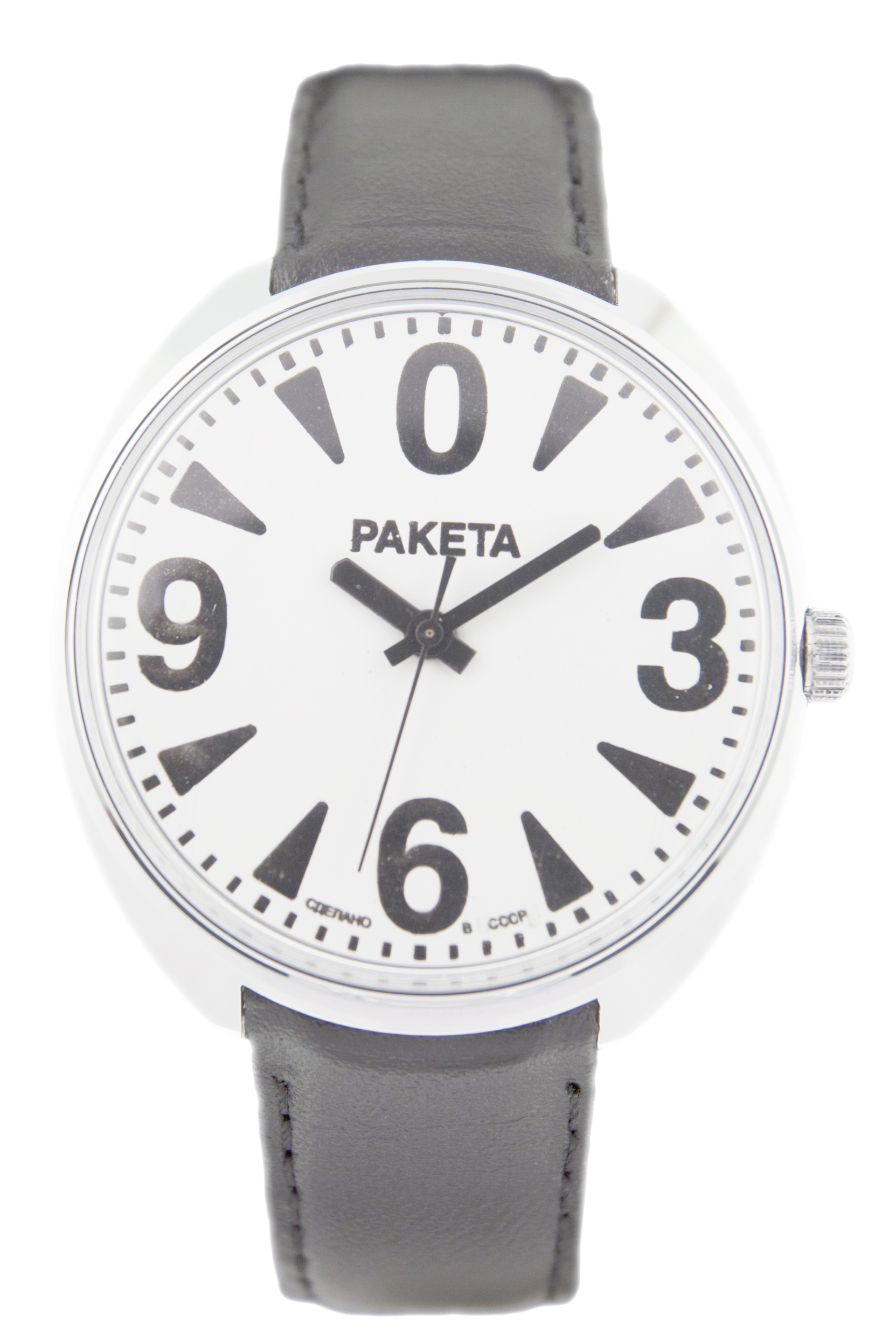
- 1985 Model "Petrodvorets Classic"
- Product type: Watch company
- Current owner: Petrodvorets Watch Factory
- Country: Russia
- Introduced: 1961
- Website: raketa.com

Raketa (Russian: Ракета, IPA: [rɐˈkʲɛtə], "Rocket") is a brand of wristwatches that have been manufactured since 1961 by the Petrodvorets Watch Factory in Saint Petersburg. Raketa watches have been produced for the Soviet Armed Forces and for North Pole expeditions, as well as for civilians. Today, Raketa is one of a handful of global watch brands that produces its own movements from start to finish. The company's revenue for 2024 in Russia amounted to almost 5 million euros.

== History ==
On 13 April 1961, Yuri Gagarin made the first manned flight in outer space on the rocket Vostok 1. In honor of this achievement, the Petrodvorets Watch Factory named its watches "Rocket"; Raketa in Russian. However, at the height of the Cold War the name "Raketa" was perceived negatively in the West, as the word was associated with the latest generation of Soviet intercontinental ballistic missiles, the R-16. During Soviet times it became one of the most produced watch brands in the world. At the peak of production in the 1970s, the factory produced about five million hand-wound watches per year.

With prices similar to Swiss luxury brands, the quality, fit and finish of Raketa timepieces have improved markedly since the 1960s. Since "Raketa" is one of the rare manufacturers capable of fully producing its watches, including movements, hairsprings and escapements in-house, its parent firm, Petrodvorets Watch Factory, is beginning to supply some Swiss watch brands having difficulty acquiring Swiss ETA movements.

=== Raketa Mechanical Movements ===
Over the years, the Petrodvorets Watch Factory has produced more than two dozen versions of Raketa movements.

=== The Petrodvorets Watchmaking School ===
Being one of the few watch brands in the world producing its own movements, the factory has created its own watchmaking school, the Petrodvorets Watchmaking School, to ensure the transmission of watchmaking expertise to future generations. The only one left in the schooling program has been established in collaboration with the Saint Petersburg State Institute of Technology.

=== Hairsprings and Escapements ===
The Petrodvorets Watch Factory Raketa is one of only five watch brands in the world producing their movements in-house from start to finish, including hairsprings and escapements. Most watch brands globally do not produce their own hairsprings, they generally order them from Nivarox, a subsidiary of Swatch Group. This enables the Russian watch industry to be independent from western suppliers, especially for producing hairsprings needed in the military aviation industry.

== Raketa Monumental Clock ==
Built in 2014 on Moscow's Lubyanka Square in the main atrium of the Central Children's Store on Lubyanka, the Raketa Monumental Clock is the world's largest clock movement. It weighs 5 tons and measures 13 metres high by 8 metres wide. Built and assembled in a record six months, it has rapidly become a major tourist attraction in Moscow. The Mayor of Moscow, Sergey Sobyanin inaugurated the clock in January 2015.

== Ambassadors and Swiss specialists ==
In 2009, the Petrodvorets Watch Factory employed three highly ranked Swiss watchmakers to help the factory adapt its production to modern standards. These watchmakers had previously worked for Rolex, Breguet and Hautlence. In 2011, the Petrodvorets Watch Factory announced that supermodel Natalia Vodianova offered to design a new watch model. Vodianova's model is based on a vintage Raketa design from 1974. A portion of the sales of this "Raketa by Vodianova" will be contributed to Vodianova's Naked Heart Foundation. In 2012, Jean-Claude Quenet, former head of Rolex's escapement department and of production at Franck Muller, joined the Russian factory. Also, in 2013 Prince Rostislav Rostislavovich Romanov became advisor to the creative department of the factory and a member of its board of directors. He created a special new design of watches commemorating the 400-year jubilee of the Romanov Dynasty.

== Awards ==
- Soviet Order of the Red Banner of Labour (1971).
