= Monument to Felix Dzerzhinsky, Ufa =

Monument in Ufa, Russia

Coordinates: 54.7278°N 55.9500°E

Monument to Felix Dzerzhinsky
- Interactive map of Monument to Felix Dzerzhinsky
- Location: Ufa, Bashkortostan, Russia
- Designer: Albert Seraphimovich Charkin
- Material: Bronze
- Height: 3 m (9.8 ft)
- Opening date: 1987
- Dedicated to: Felix Dzerzhinsky

The Monument to Felix Dzerzhinsky (Russian: Памятник Феликсу Дзержинскому) is a sculpture of Felix Dzerzhinsky, the first chairman of the Cheka, in Dzerzhinsky Park in the city of Ufa in Bashkortostan, Russia.

== History ==
The statue was erected in Ufa in 1987 near the building of the Bashkir KGB (now - the building of the Prosecutor's Office of the Republic of Bashkortostan) in the park behind the "Rodina" cinema. The sculptor of the monument was the Leningrad artist Albert Seraphimovich Charkin. The sculpture was cast at the Leningrad plant "Monumentskulptura". Simultaneously with the installation of the monument, a row of poplars were planted behind it.

The popular name of the monument is "With his back to the Motherland" because the monument is behind the "Rodina" ("Motherland") cinema and is turned away from it.

== See also ==
- Monument to Felix Dzerzhinsky, Moscow
