= Katarzyna Skórzyńska =

Polish official and diplomat

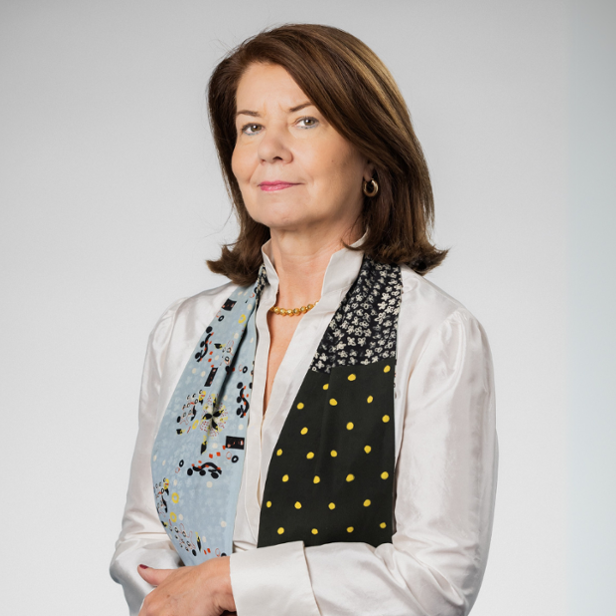

Poland Ambassador to Brazil
- In office 1992–1996
- Preceded by: Andrzej Jedynak
- Succeeded by: Bogusław Zakrzewski

Poland Ambassador to Portugal
- In office 2007–2012
- Preceded by: Janusz Rydzkowski
- Succeeded by: Bronisław Misztal

Personal details
- Born: 29 October 1959 (age 66) Warsaw, Poland
- Spouse: Jan Skórzyński
- Children: 3 daughters
- Education: University of Warsaw
- Profession: Diplomat, official, manager

Katarzyna Maria Skórzyńska (née Zarańska; born 29 October 1959, in Warsaw) is a Polish official and diplomat; ambassador to Brazil (1992–1996) and Portugal (2007–2012), Undersecretary of State in the Office of the Committee for European Integration.

== Life ==
Skórzyńska graduated from Sociology at the University of Warsaw (1987). She also studied Romance and Portuguese philology. She finished postgraduate studies in International Economic Relations at the Warsaw School of Economics. She is an Eisenhower Foundation scholar (1991).

She began her career as board member of the Civic Educational Association. Between 1989 and 1991, she was an advisor and plenipotentiary to the Minister of Education, Henryk Samsonowicz. She headed also the Office for Innovation and Community Schools. In early 1992, she joined the diplomatic service as an Ambassador to Brazil. In July 1996 she finished her term and worked at the Department of Foreign Economic Relations at the Ministry of Foreign Affairs (MFA). From 1997 to 2000, she held managerial positions in the private sector. From 2000 to 2001, she served as Undersecretary of State in the Office of the Committee for European Integration. Between 2001 and 2006, she worked for private sector as manager again. In February 2006, she returned to the MFA and became the director of the External Economic Policy Department. In 2007, she was appointed Ambassador to Portugal. She ended her term on 30 June 2012. Following that, she was nominated director of the Polish Institute of Diplomacy. From 2016 to 2018, she worked at the MFA Eastern Department. Between 2018 and 2020, she held managerial positions at the private sector. In December 2024, she became head of the Embassy of Poland in Brussels as chargé d’affaires. She ended her mission in 2026.

Besides her Polish, she speaks English, French, and Portuguese.

Daughter to Anna Skarżyńska and jurist and journalist Jan Zarański. She is married to historian Jan Skórzyński with three daughters.

== Honours ==
- Brazil: Grand Cross of the Order of the Southern Cross (1996)
- Brazil: Honorary citizen of Rio de Janeiro
- Poland: Officer's Cross of the Order of Polonia Restituta (2012)
- Portugal: Grand Officer of the Order of Prince Henry (2012)
- Portugal: Grand Cross of the Order of Merit (2008)
