= Ignacy Jan Paderewski Polish Institute of Diplomacy =

Polish government funded institution

Coordinates: 52.2475°N 21.0108°E

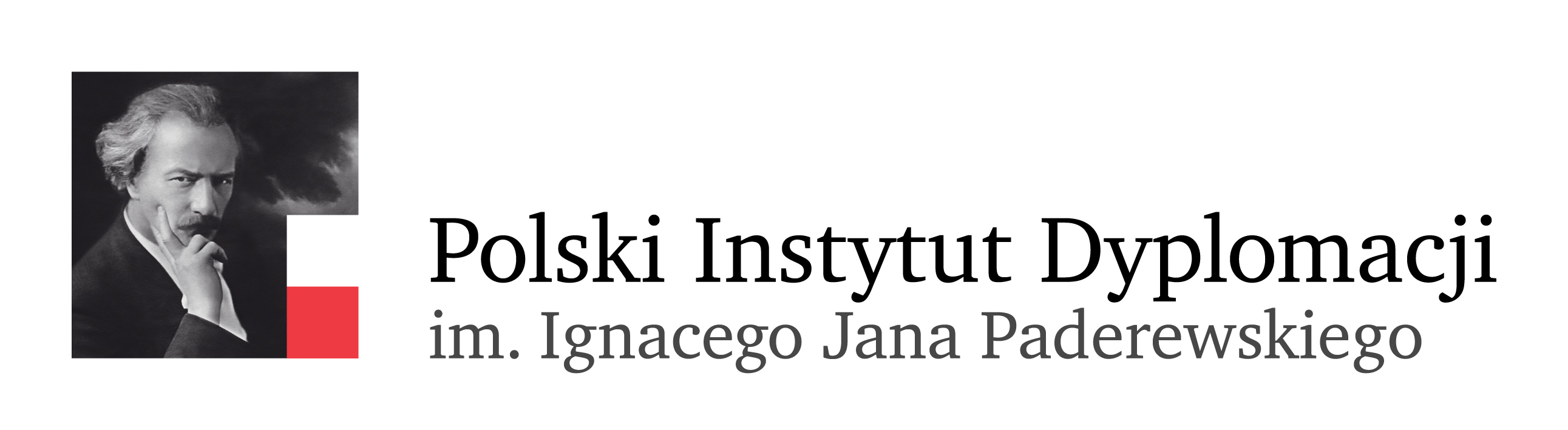

Agency overview
- Formed: 1 October 2012
- Dissolved: 30 September 2016
- Headquarters: 10 Miodowa St (entrance from 7 Podwale St.), 00-251 Warsaw
- Agency executive: Katarzyna Skórzyńska, Director
- Website: www.pid.gov.pl

The Ignacy Jan Paderewski Polish Institute of Diplomacy (PID) was a Polish government funded institution reporting to the Minister of Foreign Affairs. The primary goal of the institute was to educate and develop the professional skills of Polish Foreign Service officers. The institute offered a range of courses primarily for MFA employees.

== History ==
The Ignacy Jan Paderewski Polish Institute of Diplomacy was established on October 1, 2012, by directive of the Minister of Foreign Affairs, Radosław Sikorski. the directive was issued on September 20, 2012. Katarzyna Skórzyńska was appointed as the first director of the institute. The current patron of the institute is Ignacy Jan Paderewski, a statesman, eminent activist for independence, Polish Prime Minister, Minister of Foreign Affairs and an outstanding pianist and composer. The institute was dissolved on 30 September 2016.

== Training Courses ==
Training courses delivered by the PID were primarily geared towards employees of the Ministry of Foreign Affairs and ultimately, to civil servants working in other institutions of public administration and local government. The courses helped to train professional diplomats as well as expand knowledge of bilateral relations, the activities of international organizations such as the European Union and economy and law.

== Diplomatic and Consular Training ==
At the request of the Director General of the Foreign Service, the PID was delivering diplomatic and consular training for diplomatic corps candidates in January 2013.
