= Monument to Felix Dzerzhinsky, Moscow =

Statue in Russia

Monument to Felix Dzerzhinsky in Moscow
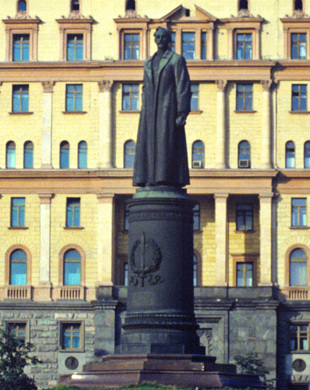
- The monument in 1991 in its original location in front of the Lubyanka Building
- Interactive map of Monument to Felix Dzerzhinsky in Moscow
- Location: SVR headquarters, Moscow
- Coordinates: 55°44′07″N 37°36′32″E
- Designer: Grigory Zakharov
- Material: Granite (statue); Steel (pedestal)
- Opening date: 20 December 1958 (Dzerzhinsky Square); 1992 (Muzeon Park of Arts); 2023 (SVR headquarters)
- Dedicated to: Felix Dzerzhinsky
- Dismantled date: 22 August 1991 (KGB location), re-erected 11 September 2023 (SVR location)

The Monument to Felix Dzerzhinsky (Russian: Памятник Дзержинскому, romanized: Pamyatnik Dzerzhinskomu), also known by the nickname Iron Felix (Russian: Железный Феликс, romanized: Zheleznyy Feliks), commemorates Felix Dzerzhinsky (1877–1926), Bolshevik revolutionary and head of the first two Soviet state-security secret police organizations, the Cheka and the OGPU. The monument, designed by Grigory Zakharov and incorporating a statue of Dzerzhinsky sculpted by Yevgeny Vuchetich, was erected on Dzerzhinsky Square, Moscow in 1958, next to the Lubyanka Building.

== History ==
=== Construction and unveiling ===
In 1918, the All-Russian Extraordinary Commission was located in the buildings on Lubyanska Square, the founder and first head of which was Felix Dzerzhinsky, who later headed other state security secret police agencies that were located there. In the autumn of 1926, shortly after Dzerzhinsky's death, Lubyanka Square was renamed Dzerzhinsky Square by the decision of the Presidium of the Moscow City Council.

In 1940, a competition was announced for the project of a monument to Dzerzhinsky, which was won by Sarra Lebedeva, who created a lifesized sculptural portrait of Dzerzhinsky, but her project was not implemented.

Construction of the monument began in July 1958, with the statue sculpted by Yevgeny Vuchetich, and the overall design by Grigory Zakharov. The monument was opened to the public in 1958, outside the Lubyanka Building, which housed the headquarters of the Soviet security services, the OGPU, NKVD (responsible for the bloodletting of the Stalin purges of the thirties), NKGB, MGB and KGB.

=== August coup and Muzeon Park relocation ===
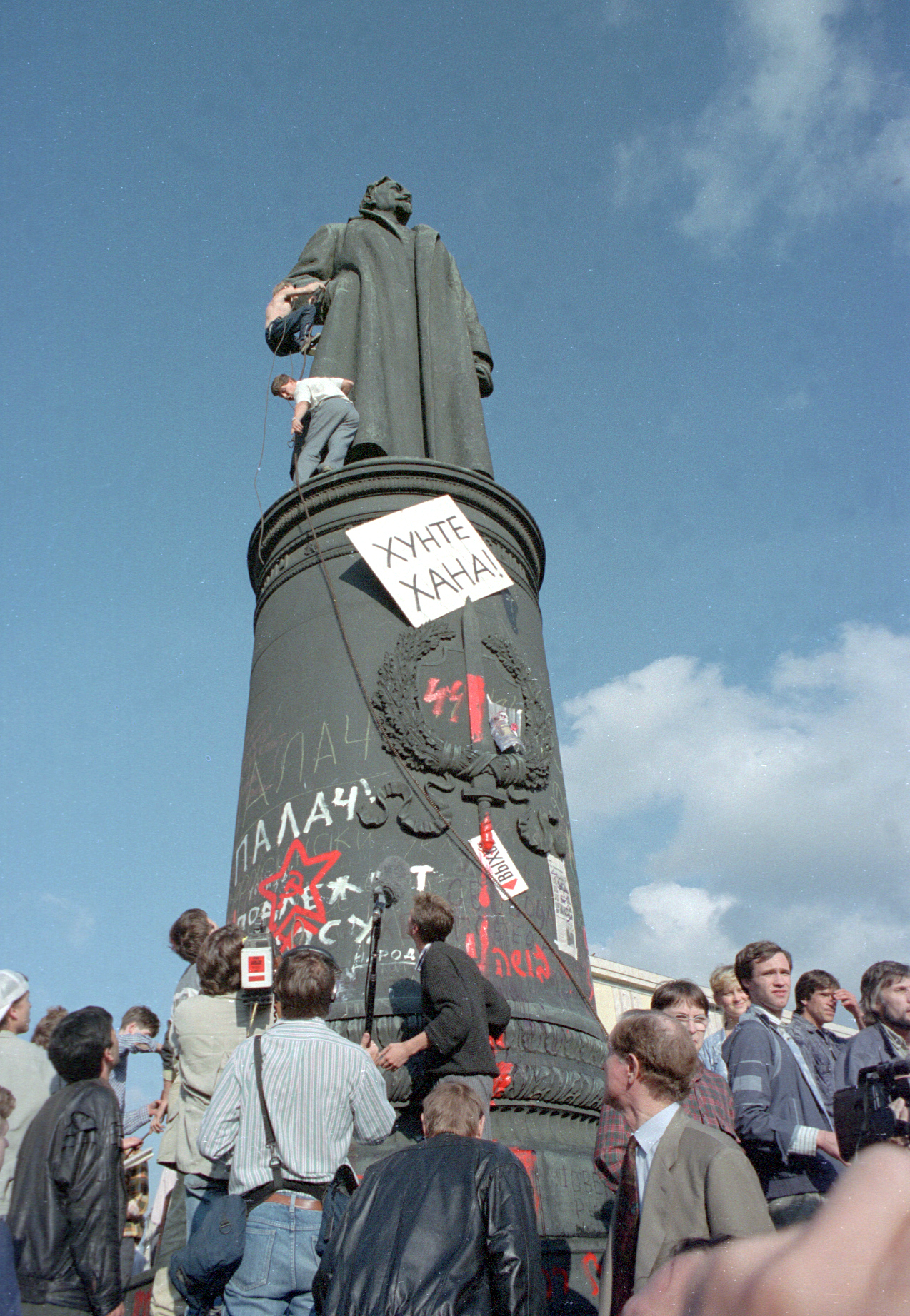

On the evening of 22 August 1991, shortly after the failure of the coup attempt undertaken by the State Emergency Committee, thousands of people began to gather around the KGB building on Lubyanka Square, seeking to topple Dzerzhinsky's statue, seeing it as a symbol of the brutal Soviet past. People sprayed the words "executioner", “antichrist”, “Felix is finished,” and the symbol of the Russian Orthodox Church on the pedestal.

By the evening of the same day, people climbed onto the statue and affixed ropes to it, attached to a truck. Toppling the monument in this way risked damaging the adjacent Lubyanka metro station. To avoid this, deputy chairman of the Moscow City Council Sergei Stankevich addressed the crowd and introduced a resolution with the Moscow City Council to remove the monument. It was then dismantled with a construction crane and taken to wasteland close to the new building of the Tretyakov Gallery. In 1992, the monument was without ceremony dumped into the Fallen Monument Park, where other Soviet-era monuments were collected.

=== Erection of a replica in 2023 ===
Over the years there have been debates on whether or not the Dzerzhinsky monument should be returned to Lubyanka Square, especially after Vladimir Putin, a former KGB-agent himself, became Russia's president in 2000. A scaled-down replica of the monument was erected on 11 September 2023, but this time in front of the Russian Foreign Intelligence Service headquarters outside Moscow.

== See also ==
- Monument to Felix Dzerzhinsky, Ufa
