= Sofia Dzerzhinskaya =

Polish politician and radio station director

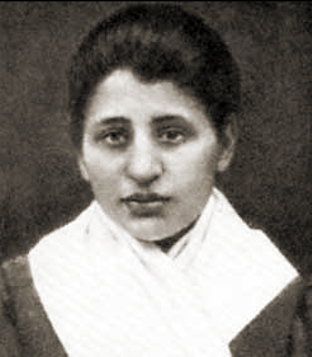
- Sofia Dzerzhinskaya
- Born: Sofia Muszkat; December 4, 1882; Warsaw, Russian Empire
- Died: February 27, 1968 (aged 85); Moscow, Soviet Union
- Resting place: Novodevichy Cemetery
- Education: Chopin University of Music
- Political party: Communist Party of the Soviet Union (1917-); Russian Social Democratic Labour Party (1905-1917); Social Democracy of the Kingdom of Poland and Lithuania (-1918)
- Spouse: Felix Dzerzhinsky
- Children: Jan Dzerzhinsky
- Awards: Order of Lenin; Order of the Banner of Labour; Order of the Red Banner of Labour

Sofia Sigizmundovna Dzerzhinskaya (born Muszkat; Polish: Zofia Dzierżyńska—Muszkat; Russian: Софья Сигизмундовна Дзержинская—Мушкат; 4 December 1882 – 27 February 1968) was a leading Polish Social Democrat and later Communist politician. During World War II, she was director of the Polish language Tadeusz Kościuszko radio station, broadcasting the communist messages into occupied Poland.

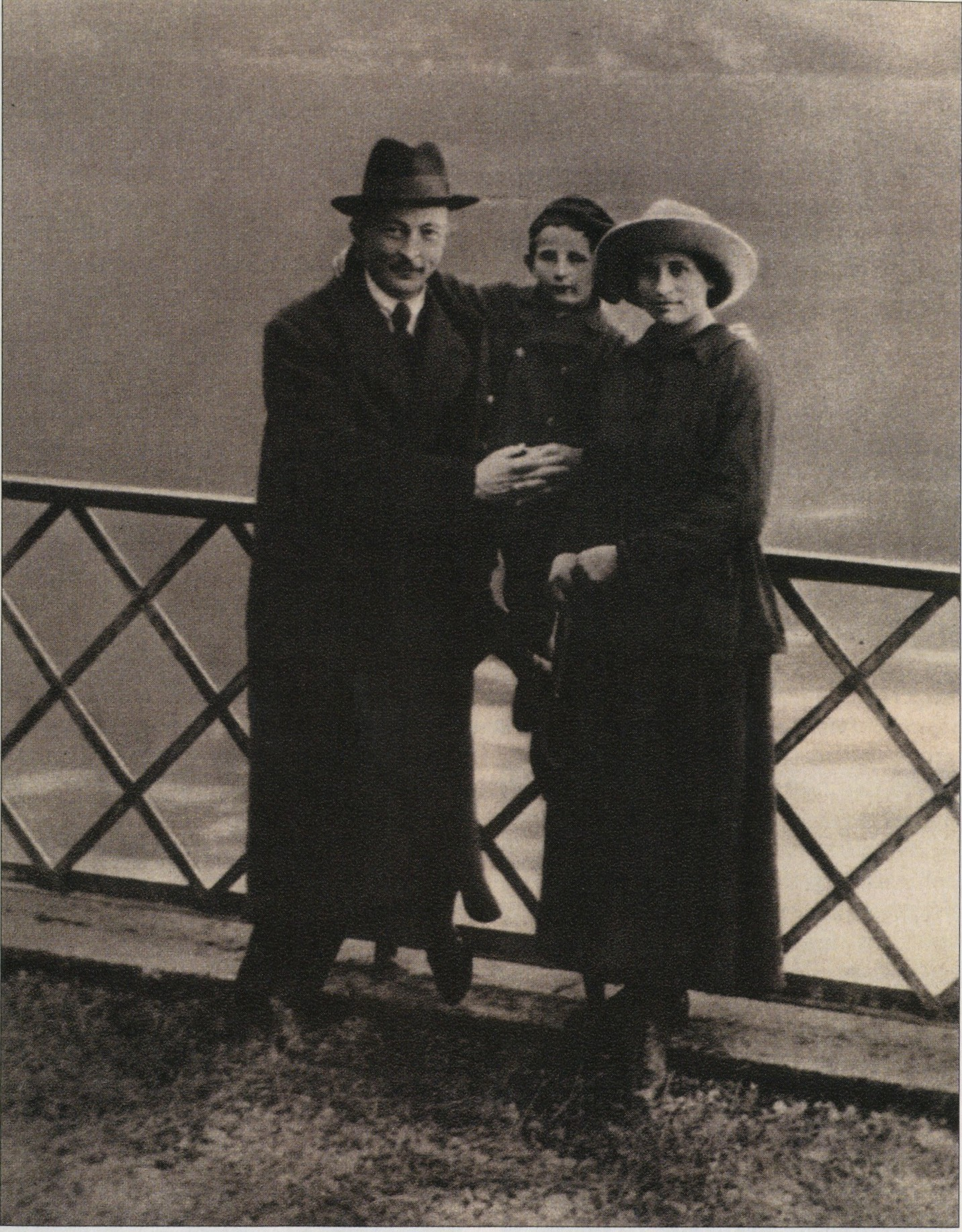
Felix and Sofia Dzerzhinskaya with their son Jan in Lugano, October 1918

== Biography ==
She was born in Warsaw, Poland, to a Jewish family. From 1904, she was associated with Social Democracy of the Kingdom of Poland and Lithuania (SDKPiL). Arrested for party activities in 1906 and again in 1909, she was administratively expelled from the borders of the Russian Empire. As an SDKPiL activist, she met, and later married Felix Dzerzhinsky, a fellow Communist activist. Their wedding took place in Kraków on November 10, 1910, at St. Nicholas Church. On June 23, 1911, their only son, Jan, was born at the Pawiak prison, where Dzerzhinskaya was imprisoned. She was then exiled to the Irkutsk Governorate, in Siberia. Her son, thanks to the help of the pediatrician Janusz Korczak, was placed in Mrs. Sawicka's private infant institution in February 1912. Then, in late May and early June of that year, he was taken care of by Zofia's brother, Marian Muszkat.

From September 1918 through February 1919, Sofia was a member of the Soviet diplomatic mission in Bern. From 1920, she lived in the Soviet Union, in Moscow where she worked as a teacher. In 1922, Sofia worked in the School of Rosa Luxemburg in Moscow, later, 1923–24 at the Communist University of the National Minorities of the West. After that, she worked in the Polish Bureau of the Communist Party of the Soviet Union. From 1939 to 1943, Sofia worked at the Executive Committee of Comintern. In 1969, her memoirs "Lata wielkich bojów: wspomnienia" were published in Poland by Książka i Wiedza publishing house. She died in Moscow in 1968 and was buried at Novodevichy Cemetery.

== See also ==
- Provisional Polish Revolutionary Committee
