= Dzerzhinovo =

Manor in Belarus

Dzerzhinovo Homstead Museum
- Государственное учреждение культуры «Музей-усадьба „Дзержиново“ Дзяржаўная ўстанова культуры «Музей-сядзіба «Дзяржынава»
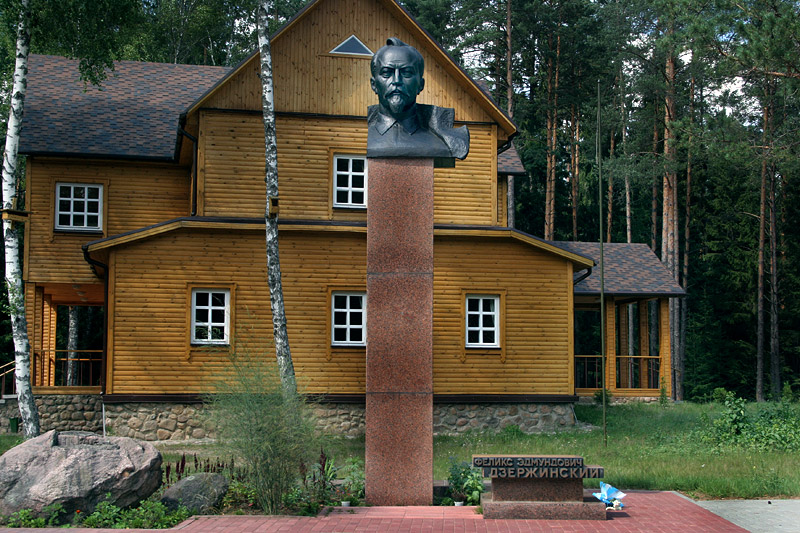
- Interactive map of the Dzerzhinovo Homstead Museum area

General information
- Location: 222686 х. Dzerzhinovo; Stowbtsy District, Minsk Region; Belarus
- Coordinates: 53.835922°N 26.541684°E
- Completed: 19th century (rebuilt in 1972)
- Demolished: 1943

Website
- dzerzhinovo.museum.by

Dzerzhinovo (Russian: Дзержиново; Belarusian: Дзяржынава; Polish: Dzierżynowo), until 1881 known as Ozhyemblovo (Polish: Oziębłowo; Russian: Оземблово; Belarusian: Аземблава), today known as the State Cultural Institution of the Dzerzhinovo Homestade Museum, is a historical and cultural estate, including a 100 ha nobleman's manor with a grange, located by the Neman River in Belarus.

Felix Dzerzhinsky, who founded and headed the Cheka, the first Soviet secret police, was born in the manor.

== History ==
The property first originated as the family estate of the Oziembłowskis, then under the name of Oziembłowo. In the 1820s, as a result of the marriage of Antonina Oziembłowska with the homestead Polish nobleman Józef Jan Dzierżyński (1788-1854), it became and remained their property. It was eventually inherited by Edmund (1838-1882). For some time, the property was leased to others (until 1875).

In 1877, Feliks Dzerzhinsky was born there. The name in the Geographical Dictionary was changed by the Dzierżyńskis in the 1881, after his birth.

Two of Feliks' brothers died there: Stanisław (killed in July 1917 by Russian soldiers returning from the front, possibly deserters) and Kazimierz (executed by the Germans in August 1943 for participating in the resistance). In retaliation for underground activity, as part of Operation Hermann, the Germans burned the manor house in summer 1943.

The history of the manor museum began in 1963, when the Council of Ministers of the BSSR (Belarusian: Савет Міністраў БССР) declared the Dzerzhinovo manor with the adjacent 80 ha lot a natural monument of republican importance. In 1972, a memorial complex was opened in Dzyarzhynsk - a branch of the Ivynetsk Memorial Museum of Dzerzhinsky. Estate lies about 3 km west of Petrilovich and 15 km from Ivyanets.

At the 10th meeting of the Council of Heads of Security Bodies and Special Services of the CIS Member States on May 25, 2001, a decision was made to restore the Dzerzhinovo memorial complex. On February 28, 2002, it was included in the State List of Historical and Cultural Values. A residential house with an attic and a part of the estate were restored with the financial support of the special services of Russia and Ukraine along with Belarusbank. On October 7, 2004, the restored complex opened. The exposition, created in the house-museum of the Dzerzhinsky family, received praise from the President of Belarus, Aleksandr Lukashenko, heads of delegations participating in the 17th meeting of the Council of Heads of Security Bodies and Special Services of the CIS Member States, and the leadership of the Belarusian secret police. According to the decision of the Minsk Regional Executive Committee from June 6, 2005, the memorial complex under the Staubtsov District Executive Committee has a modern status and name from April 17, 2006. From July 1, 2006, its director was T. M. Chuiko.

In 2007, the Museum-Mansion "Dzerzhinovo" received an incentive diploma of the FSB Award in the category "Fine Art" for the creation of a high-art exposition dedicated to Dzerzhinsky's life and work.
