= Henryk Samsonowicz =

Polish historian and politician (1930–2021)

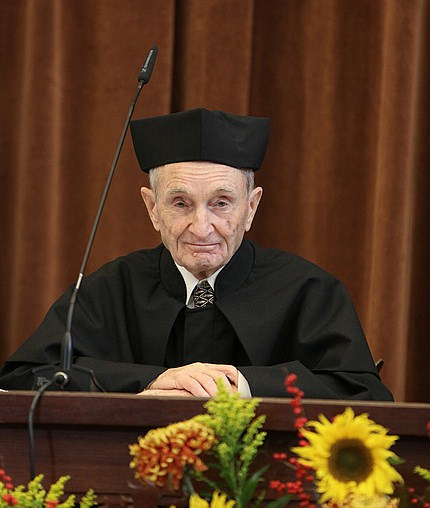
- Born: 23 January 1930; Warsaw, Poland
- Died: 28 May 2021 (aged 91)
- Education: University of Warsaw
- Scientific career
- Fields: History

Henryk Bohdan Samsonowicz (23 January 1930 – 28 May 2021) was a Polish historian specializing in medieval Poland, prolific writer, and professor of the University of Warsaw. In 1989–1990, he was the minister of education in the government of prime minister Tadeusz Mazowiecki.

== Life ==
Samsonowicz graduated in 1950 from University of Warsaw, and 1954 he received a PhD, and in 1960 was habilitated. In 1971 Samsonowicz was named a professor. Since 1967, he was a vice-dean of Department of Humanistic Studies at University of Warsaw, and in 1970 - 1973, he was the dean of the Department. Also, in 1975 - 1980, Samsonowicz was the director of the Institute of History.

In 1980, he became a member of Solidarity, and on 1 October 1980, he was nominated a rector of the University of Warsaw. Dismissed from this post on 8 April 1982, Samsonowicz participated in late 1980s in talks of the Round Table. After the 4 June 1989 election, he became Minister of Education, and in 1990, upon his decision, teaching of religious studies returned to Polish schools. Samsonowicz remained a minister until January 1991.

He lectured at the Humanistic Academy in Pułtusk, was a member of the Polish Academy of Learning, and of the Polish Academy of Sciences. He also had honorary degrees of Nicolaus Copernicus University in Toruń, Maria Curie-Skłodowska University, and University of Wrocław. He was a bearer of the Samson coat of arms, in 1984 he was awarded Légion d'honneur. Since 2008, he has been an honorary citizen of Pultusk and Ostrowiec Świętokrzyski.

He died on 28 May 2021.

== Works ==
Samson coat of arms bore by Henryk Samsonowicz's family

Samsonowicz wrote around 800 scientific papers, mostly on history of medieval Poland, including 16 books and university textbooks. Selected works include:

- Henryk Samsonowicz, Historia Polski do roku 1795 (History of Poland until 1795), Kraków 2000,
- Henryk Samsonowicz, Późne średniowiecze miast nadbałtyckich. Studia z dziejów Hanzy nad Bałtykiem w XIV-XV w. (Late Middle Ages of Baltic cities. Studies of history of the Hanseatic League in the 14th and 15th century), Warsaw 1968
- Henryk Samsonowicz, Miejsce Polski w Europie (Poland's location in Europe), Warsaw 1995
- Henryk Samsonowicz, Ziemie polskie w X wieku i ich znaczenie w kształtowaniu się nowej mapy Europy (Polish lands in the 10th century and their significance in shaping of new map of Europe), Kraków 2000
- Henryk Samsonowicz, Tysiącletnie dzieje (Thousand years of history, together with Janusz Tazbir), Wrocław 1997
- Henryk Samsonowicz, Idea uniwersytetu u schyłku tysiąclecia (The idea of a university at the dawn of the millennium, co-author), Warsaw 1998.

== See also ==
- List of Poles
