= Rodina Cinema, Ufa =

Rodina Cinema
- Кинотеатр Родина (Russian)
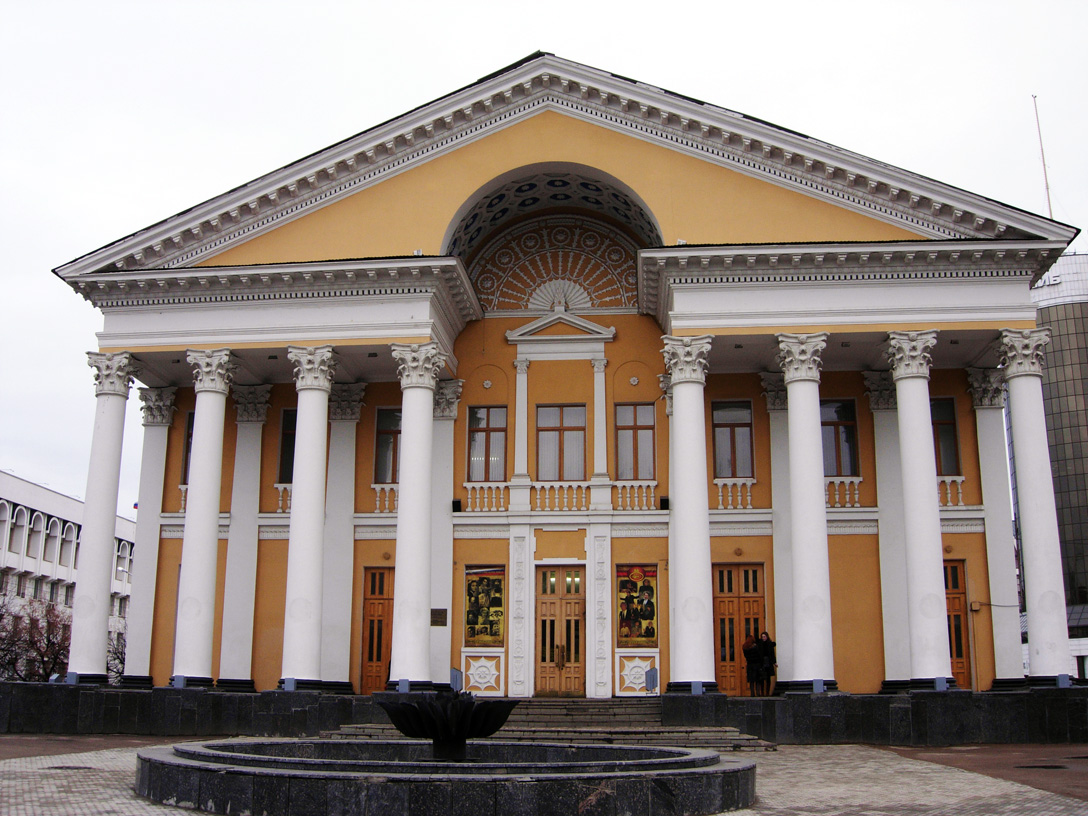
- Rodina Cinema, 2008
- Interactive map of Rodina Cinema
- 54°43′41″N 55°56′58″E
- Type: Cinema
- Location: Ulitsa Lenina, 42; Ufa, Bashkortostan, 450000; Russia

History
- Built: 1953

Site notes
- Architect: M. S. Yakshin
- Architectural style: Stalinist Empire style
- Owner: State Unitary Enterprise "Cinema Rodina RB"
- Website: rodina-ufa

The Rodina Cinema (Russian: Кинотеатр Родина, romanized: Kinoteatr Rodina, lit. 'Cinema Motherland') is an historic cinema building in Lenina Street, the main street of Ufa, Bashkortostan, Russia. The building was completed and opened in 1953, and as of 2018 was still being used as a cinema.

== History ==
=== Concept and construction ===
In March 1938, the City of Ufa accepted an initial general development plan stipulating that a two-hall cinema for 600 persons be constructed in the historical center of the city, at the intersection of Lenina and Chernyshevsky Streets. The following year, the Council of People's Commissars of the Bashkir ASSR approved the construction of the cinema, and engineering and geological surveys of the site were carried out. Soon afterwards, however, the government of the Republic issued a decree to construct a new cinema in the northern industrial district of Ufa, and then, following the intervention of World War II, the revised cinema construction plans were cancelled.

In 1944, the central city cinema project was revived, when funds for a two-hall cinema were included the budget of the celebrations for the 25th anniversary of the Bashkir ASSR. Further conceptual and design machinations ensued. Ultimately, the architect Semyon Yakshin designed a new project of a two-hall cinema for 700 persons. Although that design was based on Yakshin's own Udarnik Cinema project in Stalingrad (now Volgograd), it was modified by the transformation of the main façade into an eight-column Corinthian order portico modelled on that of another cinema in Stalingrad. The hybrid design was promptly approved, and in the summer of 1949 the construction plan completed.

A single-storey pre-revolutionary L-shaped house occupying the site was then demolished to make way for the new cinema. As it was assumed that the staff of the nearby old Кинотеатр Октябрь / Kinoteatr Oktyabr ('Cinema October') would transition to the new building, the director of the Oktyabr, Gabdrakhman Fattakhutdinov, supervised the construction of the new cinema from the outset, and then became its first director. On his initiative, part of the new cinema's basement was equipped as a documentary film hall with 60 seats.

The construction work was also closely monitored by the architect, who made his final design and construction proposals in March 1953, only three months before the cinema was opened on 30 July 1953.

=== Operations ===
On opening day, thousands of Ufa residents visited the new cinema, and watched the movie "Незабываемый 1919-й год" / Nezabyvaemyy 1919 god (The Unforgettable Year 1919). The new cinema's two main auditoriums, each with 350 seats, were named "Red" and "Blue", respectively, and the small documentary hall was named "Green".

Initially, the foyer was fitted with a stage on which pre-session jazz or classical concerts were played. Patrons could arrive early and enjoy ice cream at the cafe, “plop” cologne from a vending machine, or admire locally drawn posters depicting new films; parents could leave their child in the children's playroom.

During its early years, the cinema was surrounded by shabby low-rise houses. By the 1970s, the houses had been demolished, but they were replaced by tall buildings that overshadow the cinema.

In the 1990s, the "Green" room was transformed into a music cafe, then a "Yellow Submarine", and later a blues club. It has since reverted to being a cinema. In the 21st century, the foyer has been used for personal appearances by film directors, and for art exhibitions; ice cream is still served there. Meanwhile, the auditoriums have hosted such attractions as theatre performances, film festivals, arthouse film shows, and movie marathons.

Since 1996, the cinema has been a Center for Russian Cinematography. In 2003, a festive program was held to celebrate its 50th anniversary. The cinema now has a Dolby Digital Surround EX format sound system, comfortable soft seating, and, since December 2009, the "Red" room has been equipped to show films in 3D.

The cinema's owner, State Unitary Enterprise "Cinema Rodina RB", was founded in 1992. On 13 March 2018, the Head of the Republic of Bashkortostan, Rustem Khamitov, issued a decree adding the Unitary Enterprise to the list of strategic enterprises of the Republic.

In 2024, a project for the renovation of the cinema building was developed and approved.

== Gallery ==
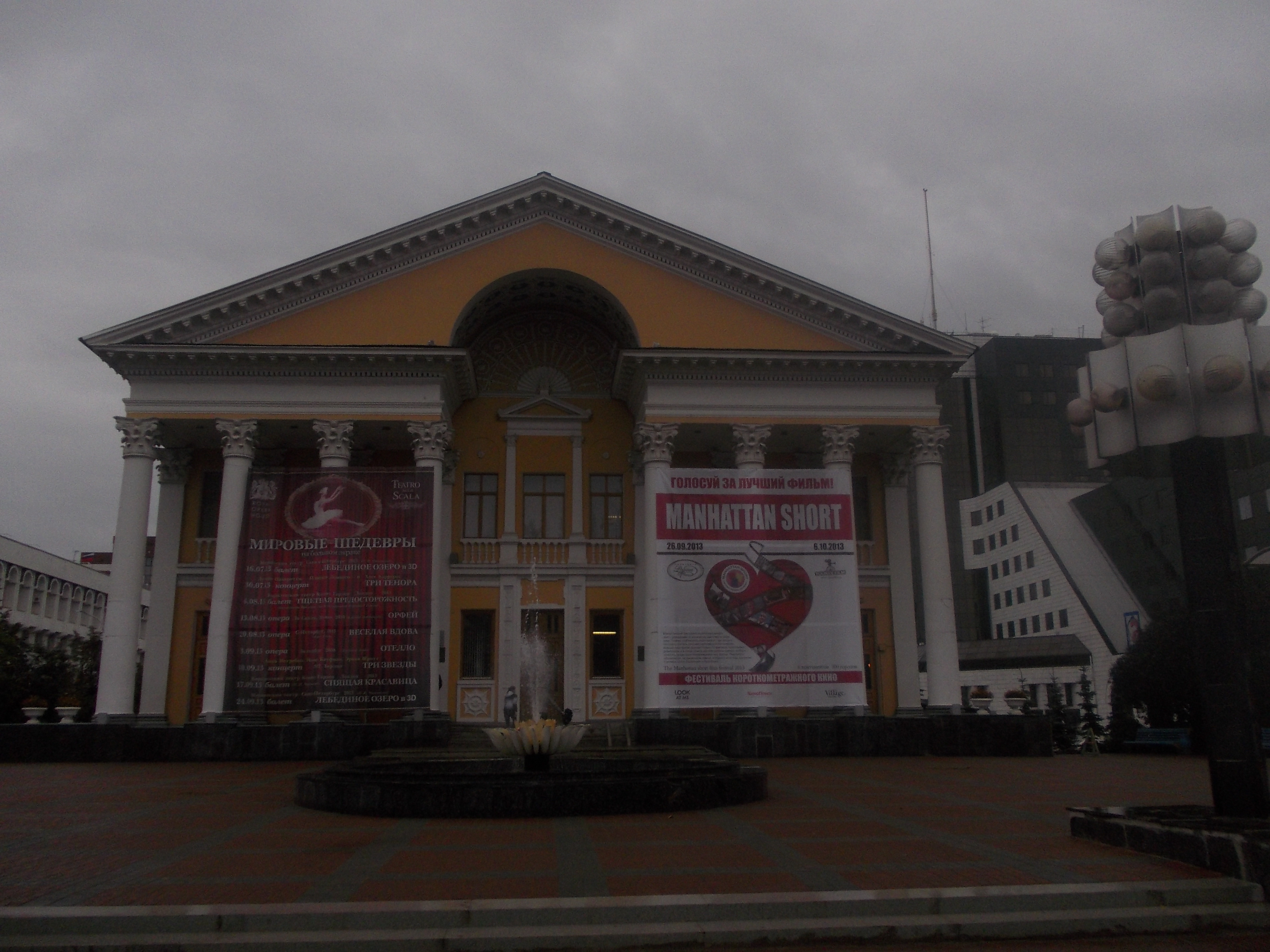

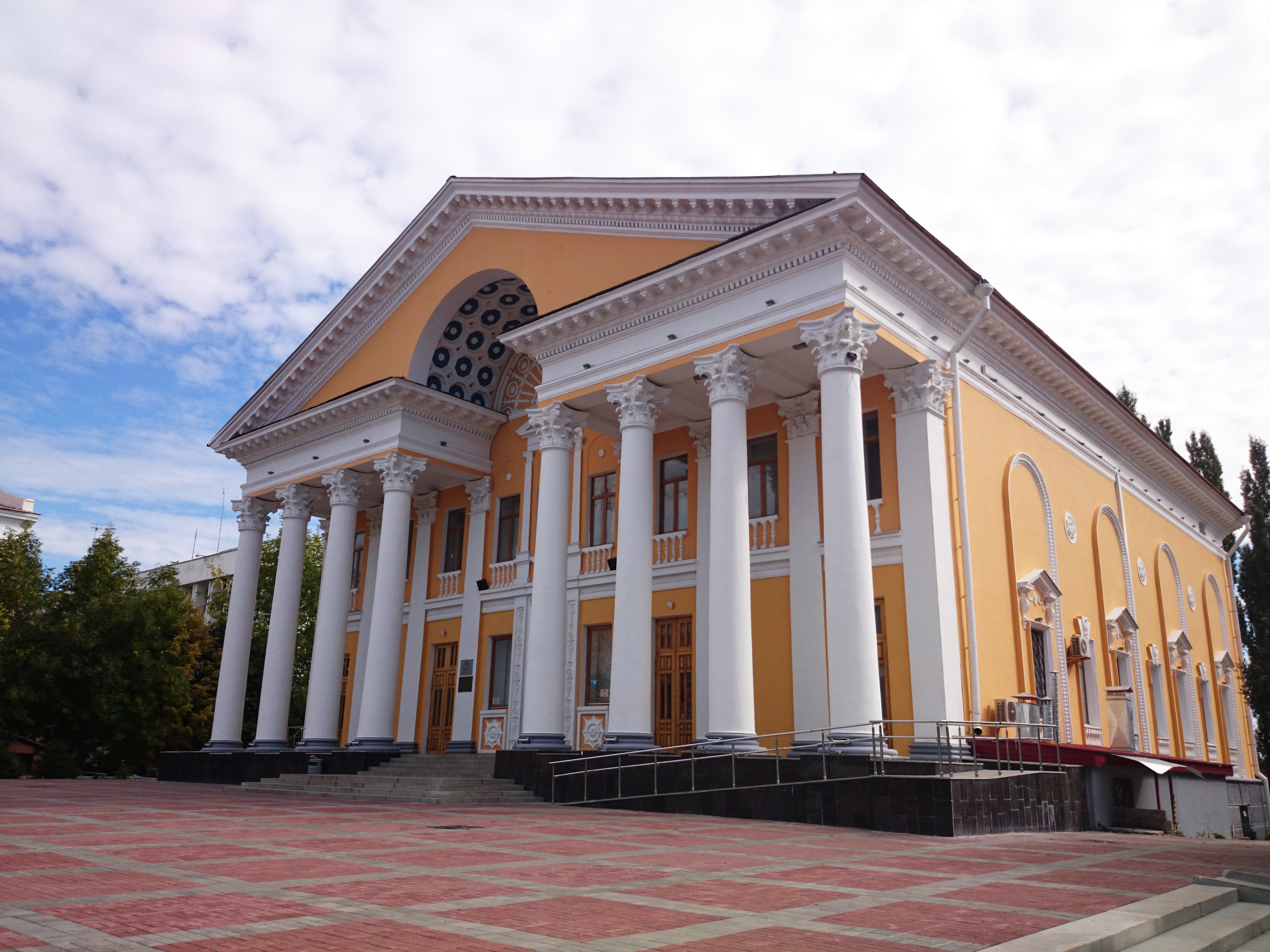

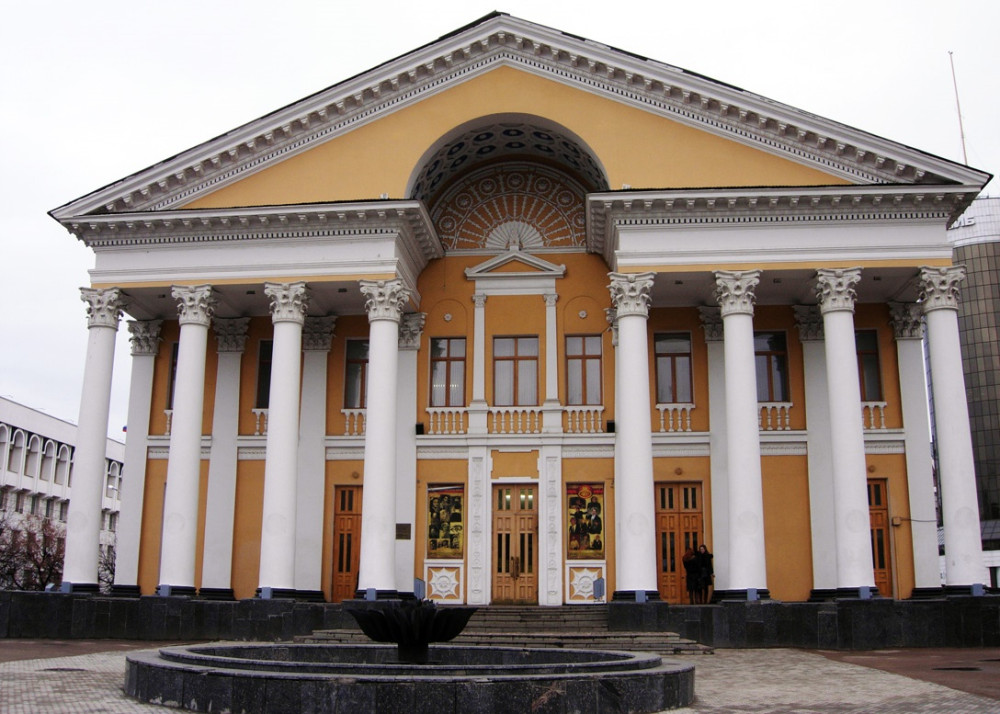

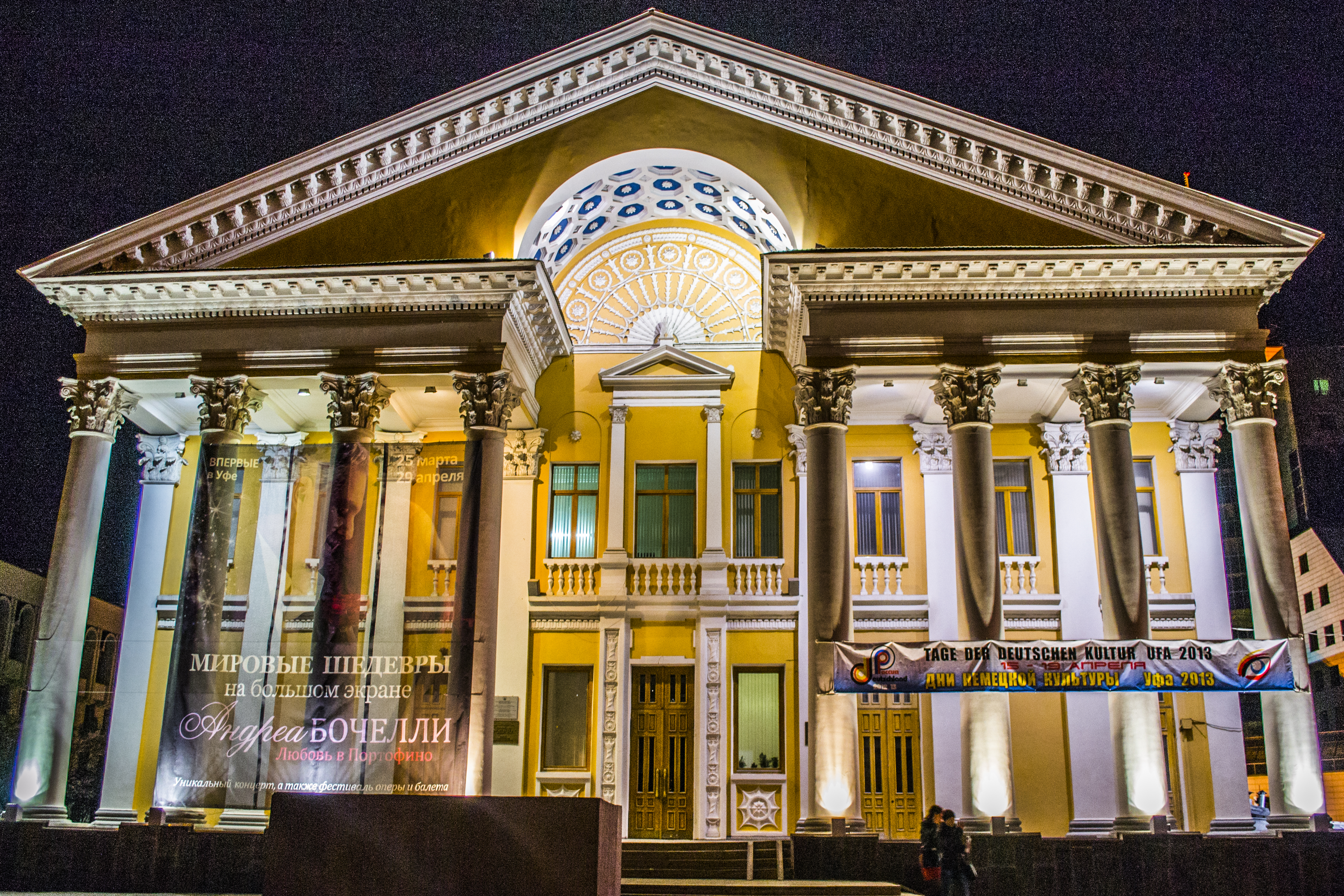

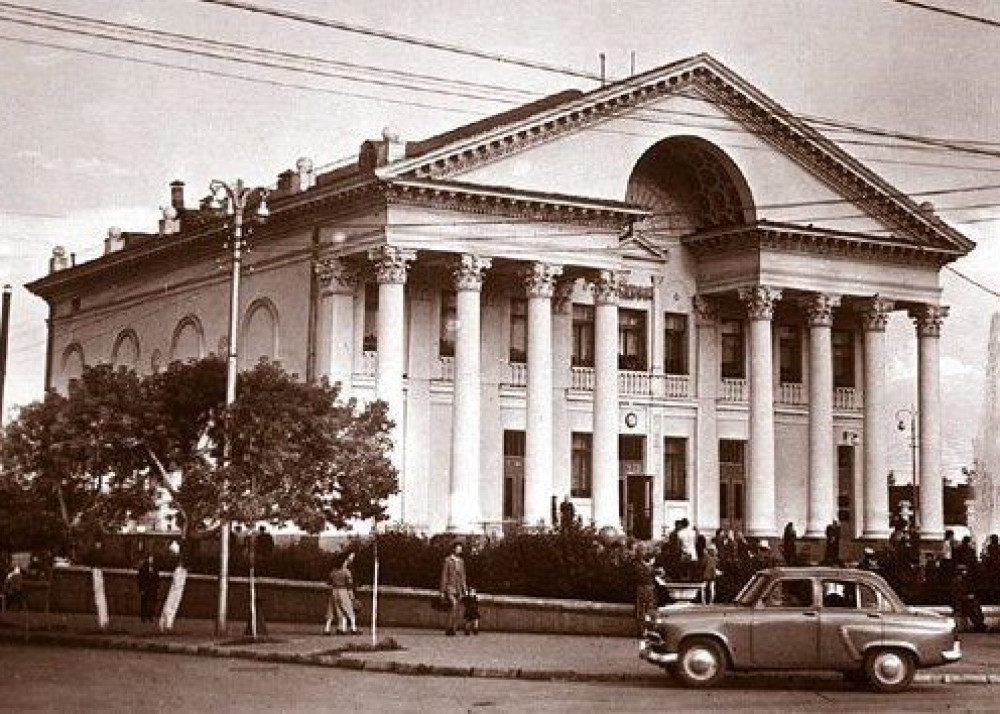

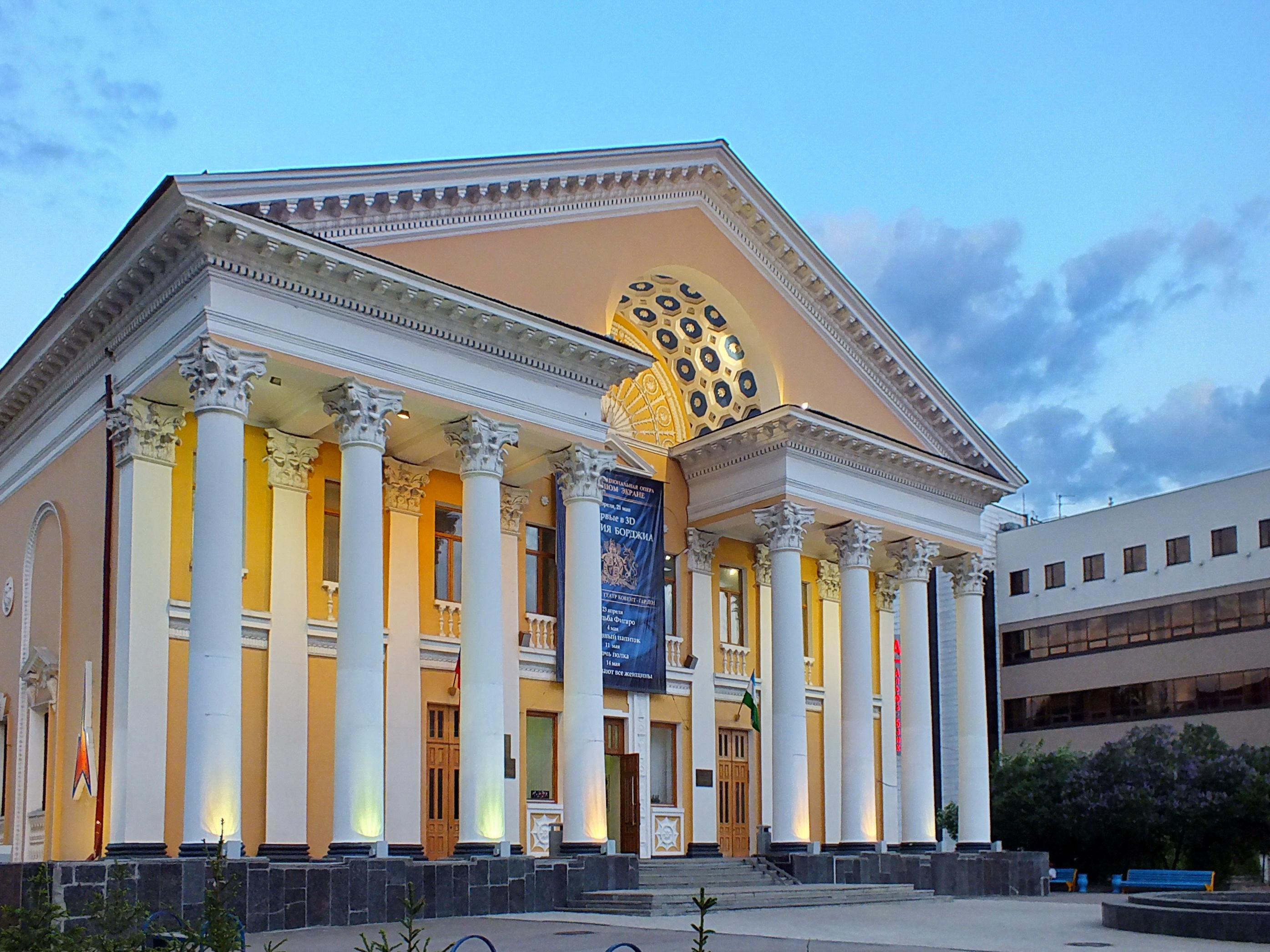

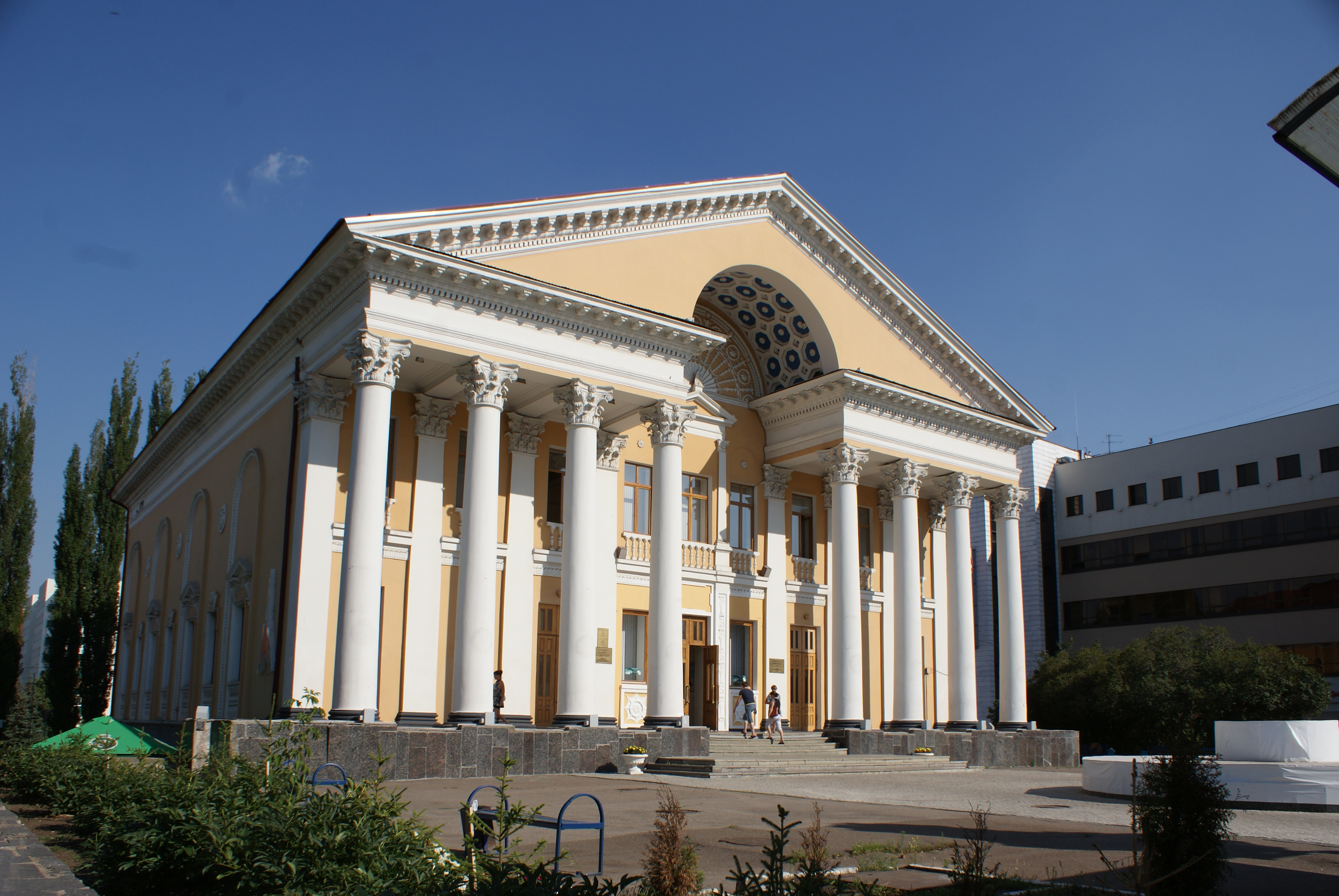
