= Amphibia (taxon) =

There are several taxa named amphibia. These include:

- Amphibia (class), classis Amphibia, the amphibians

== Species ==
Species with the specific epithet 'amphibia'

- Rorippa amphibia (R. amphibia), a plant
- Persicaria amphibia (P. amphibia), a plant
- Neritina amphibia (N. amphibia), a snail
- Aranea amphibia (A. amphibia), a spider

== See also ==
- Amphibian (disambiguation)
- Amphibia (disambiguation)
