= Amphibia (disambiguation) =

The Amphibia are a class of animals.

Amphibia may also refer to:

- Amphibia (TV series), a 2019 American animated series
- Amphibia (album), a 1996 Patrick Rondat album
- Amphibia (taxon), several taxa known as "amphibia"

== See also ==
- Amfibia, a Soviet diving watch
- Anfibia, an Argentine magazine
- Amphibian (disambiguation)
- Amphibious (disambiguation)
