= Amphibious =

Amphibious means able to use either land or water. In particular it may refer to:

== Animals ==
- Amphibian, a vertebrate animal of the class Amphibia (many of which live on land and breed in water)
- Amphibious caterpillar
- Amphibious fish, a fish that is able to leave water for extended periods of time
- Amphibious insect, an insect which lives in the air or on land and breeds in water
- Amphibious rat (disambiguation)
- Scolopendra cataracta, a species of amphibious centipede

== Arts and media ==
- Amphibious (2010 film), a thriller film
- Amphibious (2020 film), a drama film
- Amphibius (comics), a minor comic book character

== Technology ==
- Amphibious aircraft, an aircraft capable of landing on either water or land
- Amphibious vehicle, a vehicle capable of being driven on both land and water
- Amphibious warfare, warfare carried out on both land and water

== See also ==
- Amphibian (disambiguation)
- Amphibia (disambiguation)
