= Vostok (watches) =

Russian watch manufacturer

Coordinates: 55°21′56.19″N 50°36′18.64″E

Vostok Watch Makers, Inc.
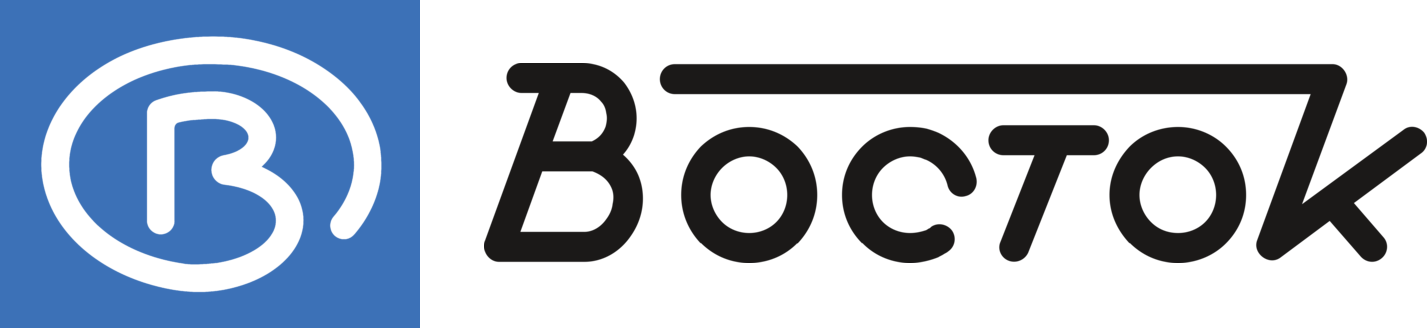
- Type: Joint stock company
- Industry: Watch manufacturing
- Founded: 1942
- Headquarters: Chistopol, Russia
- Products: Wristwatches, Clocks, Watch movements, Clock movements
- Revenue: $1.01 million (2017)
- Operating income: $116,827 (2017)
- Net income: $71,731 (2017)
- Total assets: $1.18 million (2017)
- Total equity: $861,237 (2017)

Vostok Watch Makers, Inc. (Russian: Восток; literally meaning "East") is a Russian watch brand and manufacturer based in Chistopol, Tatarstan, Russia. The company produces mainly ruggedized mechanical watches, namely the Komandirskie and Amfibia models. It also makes clocks and watch movements for other watch brands.

== History ==
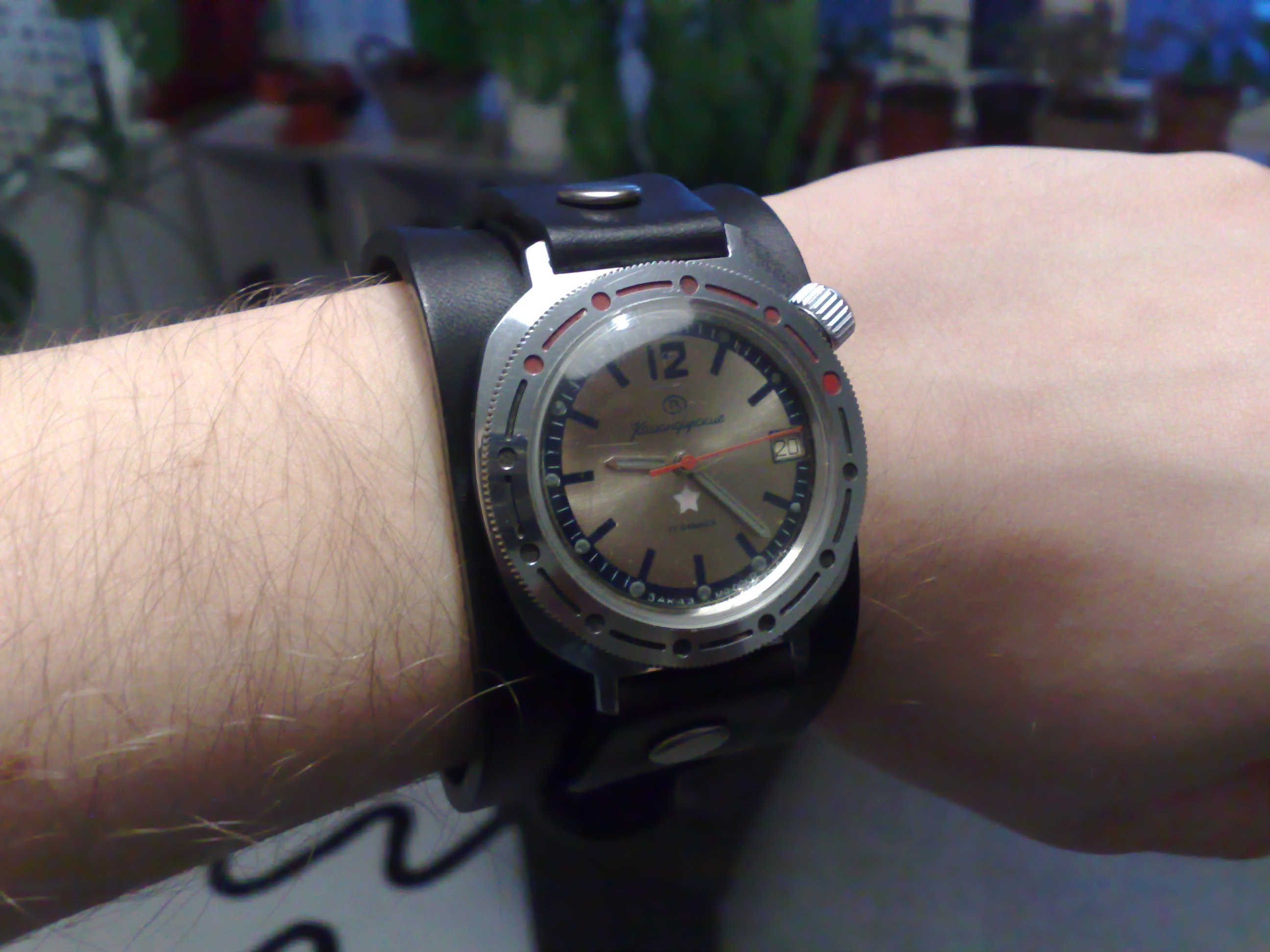
The Vostok Komandirskie, marked "ЗАКАЗ МО СССР", meaning "Ordered by the Ministry of Defence of the USSR"

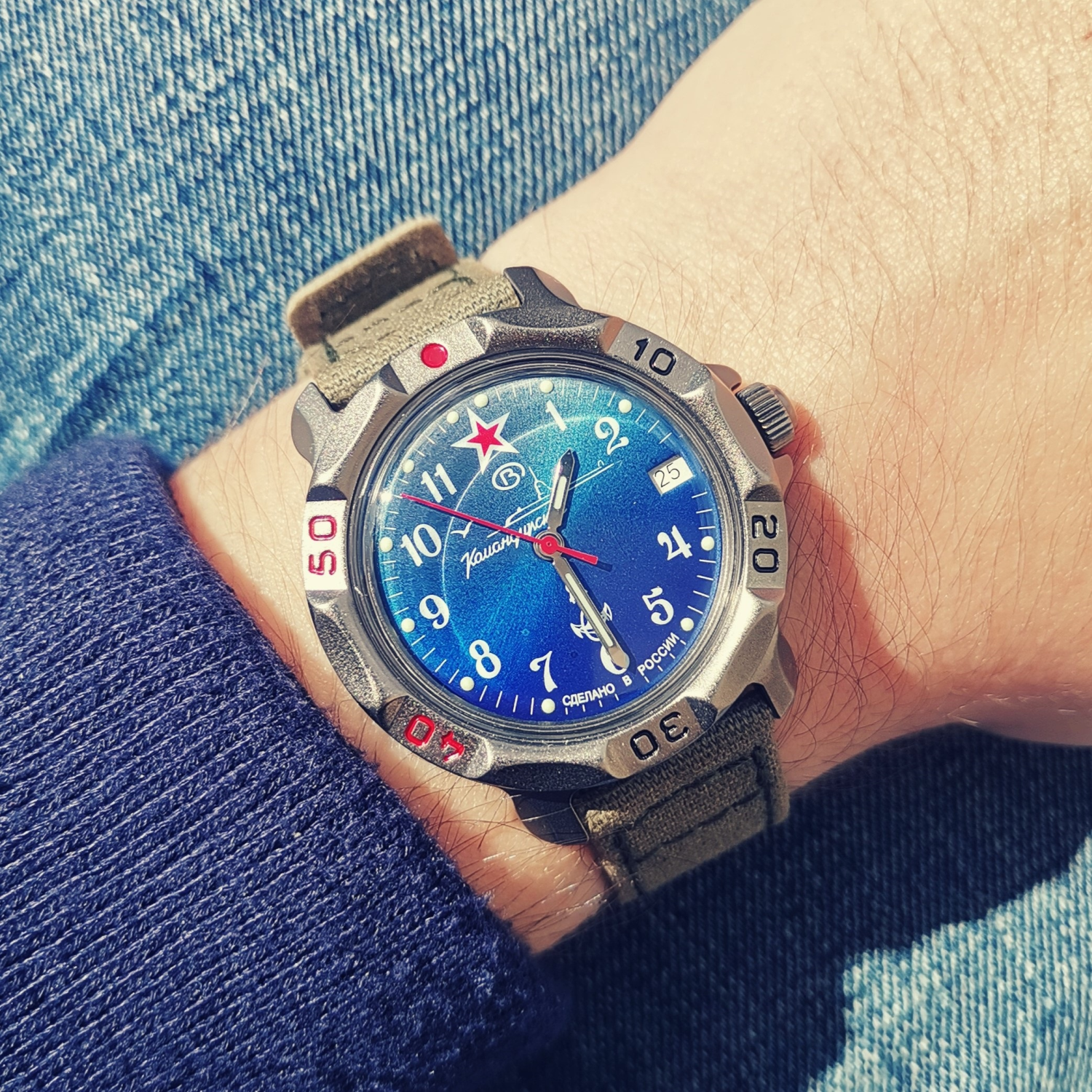
Vostok Komandirskie with manual 2414A movement.

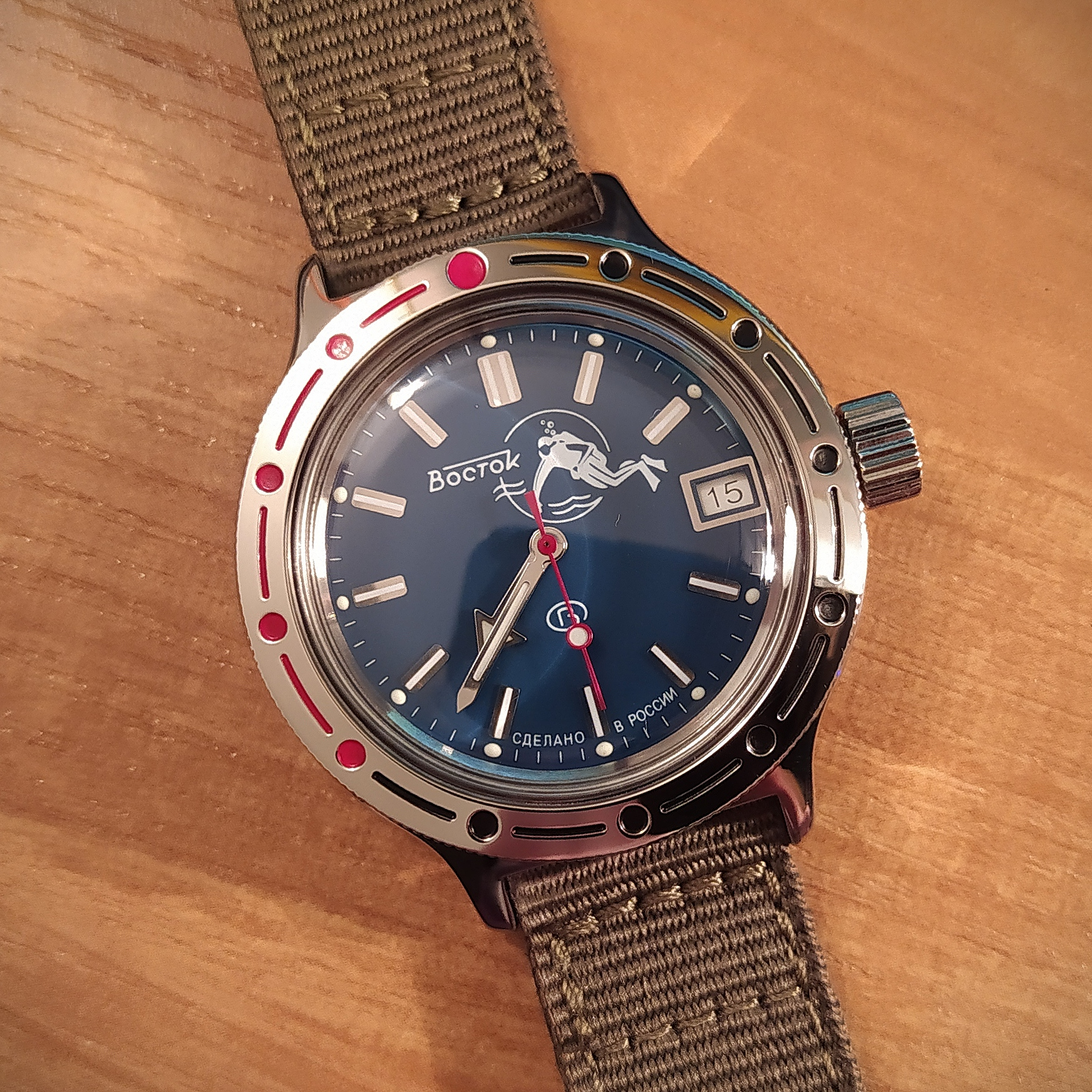
Modern Vostok Amphibia with popular "Scubadude" dial.

Vostok watch factory (initially named Chistopol watch factory) was established in 1941 following the evacuation of the First Moscow Watch Factory to Chistopol, a small town on the Kama River in Tatarstan. Initially, the factory focused on military equipment. In 1943, Chistopol watch factory started to manufacture Kirovskie wristwatches. Since 1945, the factory focused on producing watches, including wristwatches, wall clocks, automotive watches, outdoor clocks.

In 1952, Chistopol watch factory produced its first shock-resistant, dust- and waterproof Kama wristwatches. In 1962, the production of the factory was awarded the large gold medal at the Leipzig International Fair. Since 1965, the factory became the official supplier of the USSR Ministry of Defense. In 1965, it launched its iconic Komandirskie watches followed by Amfibia in 1967. Since 1969, the factory changed the name to Vostok (after the factory's first precision watch model) and all its models were subsequently branded as Vostok watches.

In the late Soviet period, Vostok watches became increasingly popular in Europe, the United States, and Japan. In 1991, the US military ordered a significant number of Komandirskie watches for the US forces participating in the international military operation in Iraq because of their robustness and low price. A significant volume of fake Vostok watches was produced by third parties in Western Europe and the US.

Following the collapse of the Soviet Union, the production of Vostok watches continued. The factory was privatized in 1993. The same year, it signed an exclusive distribution agreement for around 500,000 timepieces per year with a Swiss-based BN-Trading. The factory went bankrupt in 2010 and was reorganized as several smaller entities ultimately owned by the same Vostok Watch Factory LTD.

Like other Soviet watches, Vostok became pretty common in the movie industry prop kits due to low price and variety of designs that can fit any character and outfit.

== Production ==
Vostok was the first Soviet watch manufacturer to introduce luminous hands in its timepieces. Vostok also used an unusual two-part crown construction in its diver watch to prevent pressure damage to the movement. In 1980s, Vostok added an automatic rotor to its 24xx line of movements.

In the 2016 interview, the CEO of Vostok watch factory claimed that the watchmaker employed 450 people and produced around 15,000 to 18,000 timepieces per month.

== List of Vostok movements ==
The models produced are listed in the table below. Movement codes are based on the standard Soviet-era system.

Code	Diameter, mm	Height, mm	Type	Jewels	BPH	Features	Used in
2403	24	3.7	Manual	17	19800	Second hand at 9 o'clock	Vostok VOT
2209	22	3.7	Manual	17	18000	Central second hand	Vostok Amphibia (first models)
2409	24	3.7	Manual	17	19800	Central second hand	Vostok Amphibia, Amphibia lady first, Junior 2409A
2414A	24	4.14	Manual	17	19800	Central second hand, date indicator	Vostok Komandirskie manual, Komandirskie K-65
2415	24	-	Automatic	31	19800	Central second hand	Vostok Amphibia 1967
2415B	24	-	Automatic	31	19800	Second hand at 9 o'clock	Vostok K-43
2416B	24	6.3	Automatic	31	19800	Central second hand, date indicator	Vostok Komandirskie, Amphibian, Kremlyovskie, Prestige, Breeze, Titanium, 2416B, VIP; Vostok Europe Pobeda
2423	24	3.7	Manual	17	19800	24h dial, central second hand	-
2424	24	3.7	Manual	17	19800	24h dial, central second hand, date indicator	-
2426	24	6.3	Automatic precision	32	19800	Central second hand, 24h indicator, date indicator	Vostok Komandirskie K-34; Vostok Europe Rocket N1, Gaz 14 Limousine, Radio Room & Expedition 2006
2426.12	24	6.3	Automatic precision	32	19800	Second hand at 10 O'clock, Central Hour minute and 24h hands	Vostok Komandirskie 650539; Vostok Amphibia SE 150520S, SE 650521S
2431B	24	6.3	Automatic	31	19800	24h dial, central second hand, date indicator	Vostok automatic 24H
2432	24	6.3	Automatic precision	32	19800	Central second hand, date indicator, day/night indicator	Vostok New commander , Komandirskie K-35; Vostok Europe Mryia, Arktika, K3, Lunokhod, Red Square, Maxim Gorky.
2433	24	6.3	Automatic	31	19800	Central second hand, open heart, bridge 2416B	Vostok 2433.
2434	24	4.14	Manual	17	19800	Central second hand	Vostok military manual
2435	24	6.3	Automatic precision	31	19800	Central second hand, date indicator, day/night indicator	Vostok Europe Metro
2441	24	6.5	Automatic	32	19800	Second hand at 10 o'clock, off-centre hour and minute hands, date indicator	Vostok Europe Energia, Vostok 2441

== See also ==
- Amfibia
- Poljot
- Raketa
- Pobeda
