= Vostok Europe =

Lithuanian watch brand

- Type: private company
- Industry: watchmaking
- Founded: 2003; 23 years ago in Vilnius, Lithuania
- Founders: Igor Zubovski
- Key people: Igor Zubovskij (CEO); Valentina Rinkevičienė (CFO); Ivan Krauchenia (designer)
- Products: watches
- Production output: 15 to 20 thousand units
- Parent: Koliz Vostok UAB

Vostok Europe is a Lithuanian watch brand owned by Koliz Vostok and manufactured in Vilnius since 2003.

== History ==
The company Koliz Vostok was founded in 2003 by physicist Igor Zubovski and his Vilnius Research Institute of Radio Measuring Instruments co-workers. In the early 1990s, they developed radio-electronic equipment for the Vostok watch factory based in Chistopol, Tatarstan. Later, they started a watch distribution company named Koliz and got interested in designing and manufacturing new watches with custom designs and movements from a reliable manufacturer.

In 2003, Koliz established a new company, Koliz Vostok, to produce watches under the new Vostok Europe brand, utilizing Vostok movements. Two movements, 2426 and 2432, were developed and exclusively produced for Vostok Europe. The first collection of Vostok Europe watches was presented at the 2004 Baselworld. Later, Vostok Europe switched to Japanese and Swiss suppliers as it wasn't satisfied with the development of Vostok movements and had no ties to Vostok since the late 2000s (when the factory in Chistopol nearly went bankrupt).

To emphasize its independence, following the 2022 Russian invasion of Ukraine, Vostok Europe issued a limited-edition Slava Ukraini model and raised EUR 60,000 in aid for the defending country.

== Production ==
Vostok Europe watches are manufactured in Vilnius. Each timepiece is assembled by the same person by hand and passes a 29-point quality inspection. The company uses the watch winder machine, rescued from the decommissioned Poljot watch factory. The company produces about 15 to 20 thousand watches per year, with about 5% sold in Lithuania and the rest distributed to Europe, Asia, and the US through Vostok Europe US Official Store.

Vostok Europe uses Japanese movements produced by companies of the Seiko Group (TMI, Seiko Instruments, Seiko Epson), Miyota. Previously, it also installed some Swiss movements from Ronda, and Soprod (part of Festina) into its timepieces. In 2014, Vostok Europe was the first company to use the new Seiko SII NE88 self-winding movement in the watches dedicated to the 10th anniversary of the brand.

=== Design ===
Vostok Europe targets a young audience of adventurers, outdoor enthusiasts, and extreme sports enthusiasts. The cases are made of stainless steel (sometimes with PVD coating), titanium, or bronze and come with steel bracelets, leather or silicone straps.

Since 2009, Vostok Europe has installed mb-microtec self-luminous tritium tubes in some of its models in addition to Super-LumiNova incies. Vostok Europe relies exclusively on K1 mineral glass (aka Hardlex) for its fracture resistance compared to sapphire glass.

=== Naming ===
Many Vostok Europe models have been themed around technological advancements of the 20th century: Lunokhod was inspired by the unmanned lunar rovers, parts of the Lunokhod programme, Energia-3 by the heavy launch vehicle Energia, Ekranoplan by the Caspian Sea Monster, an experimental ground-effect vehicle, N1 Rocket by the homonymous super heavy-lift launch vehicle, Anchar by the K-222 submarine, Mriya by the Antonov An-225 Mriya, Limousine Gaz-14 by Chaika, and the North Pole 1 is a reference to the North Pole-1 arctic research station.

Other models include SSN-571 which bears the name of the world's first nuclear submarine USS 571 Nautilus and the Radio Room dedicated to the 100th anniversary of the Radio Act of 1912 (which shaped the design of specialized radio room watches), the Space Race with a reference to the competition between the USSR and the US for the dominance in space, and the Batiscafos diving wristwatch inspired by the deep-sea submarines.

== Ambassadors ==
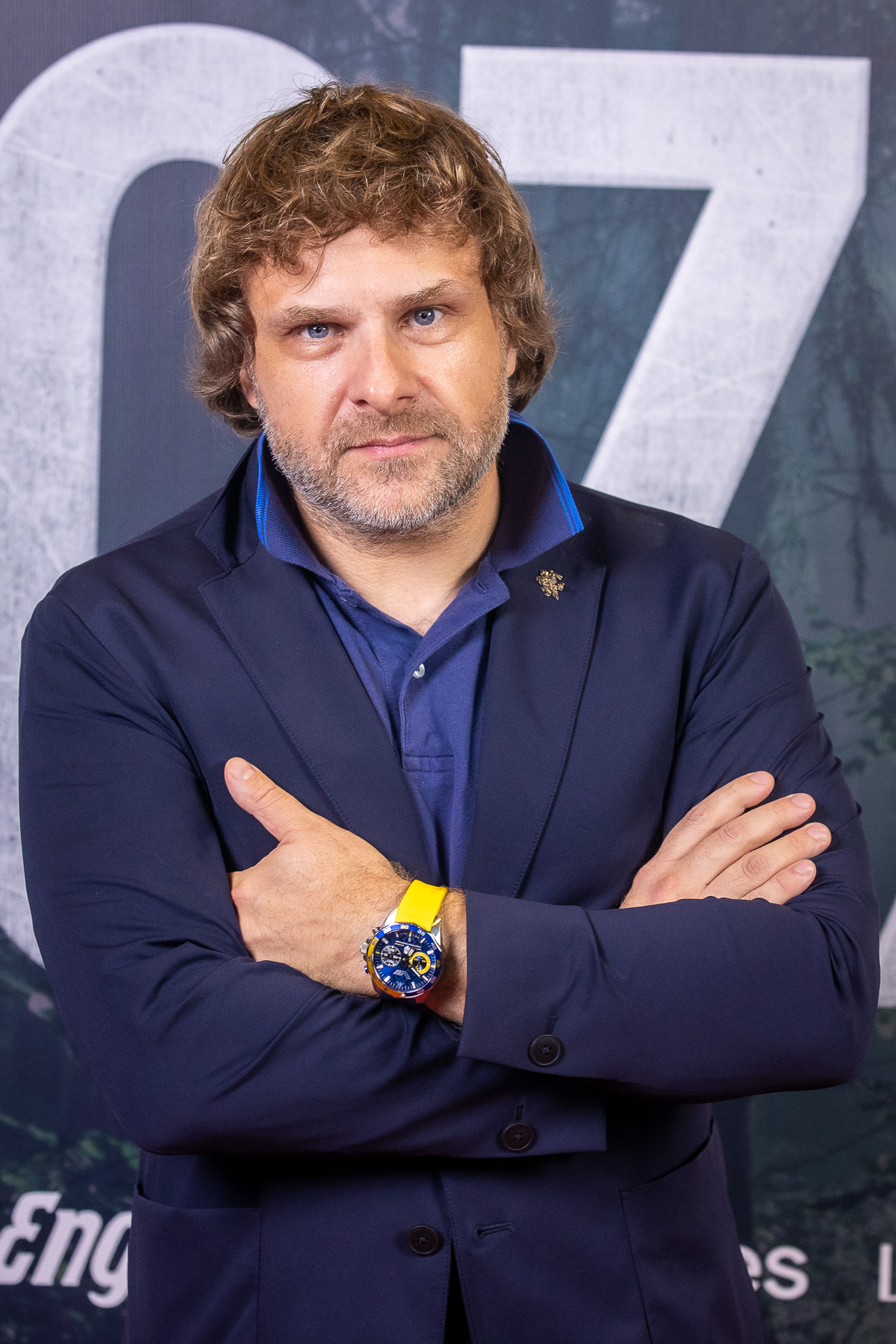
Benediktas Vanagas wearing Vostok Europe Slava Ukraini wristwatch

Vostok Europe advertises itself as watches for going to extremes and most of its brand ambassadors are international level athletes or people working in extreme conditions: Lithuanian rally driver Benediktas Vanagas, Polish mixed martial artist Marcin Tybura, Lithuanian aerobatic pilot Jurgis Kairys, Lithuanian professional strongman Žydrūnas Savickas, Portuguese saturation diver João Rainho, Greek health scientist and professor at the Plymouth Marjon University Giorgos Sakkas, and Bulgarian bodybuilder and trainer Lazar Angelov. Some of the ambassadors collaborated with Vostok Europe on the watches dedicated to them.

Vostok Europe provided wristwatches to the Lithuanian-Ukrainian speleologists' team that descended into Krubera Cave in 2013, and later issued a limited-edition Expedition Everest Underground model to commemorate their success. The members of Benediktas Vanagas's team use the brand's watches during the Dakar Rally. To advertise the Lunokhod 2 model, the company launched it into the stratosphere on a hot air balloon to test it against acceleration, vacuum, and low temperature.
