= Classic =

Outstanding example of a particular style

A classic is an outstanding example of a particular style; something of lasting worth or with a timeless quality; of the first or highest quality, class, or rank – something that exemplifies its class. The word can be an adjective (a classic car) or a noun (a classic of English literature). It denotes a particular quality in art, architecture, literature, design, technology, or other cultural artifacts. In commerce, products are named 'classic' to denote a long-standing popular version or model, to distinguish it from a newer variety. Classic is used to describe many major, long-standing sporting events. Colloquially, an everyday occurrence (e.g. a joke or mishap) may be described in some dialects of English as 'an absolute classic'.

"Classic" should not be confused with classical, which refers specifically to certain cultural styles, especially in music and architecture: styles generally taking inspiration from the Classical tradition, hence classicism.

== The Classics ==
The classics are the literature of ancient Greece and Rome, known as classical antiquity, and once the principal subject studied in the humanities. Classics (without the definite article) can refer to the study of philosophy, literature, history and the arts of the ancient world, as in "reading classics at Cambridge". From that usage came the more general concept of 'classic'.

The Chinese classics occupy a similar position in Chinese culture, and various other cultures have their own classics.

== Cultural classics ==
Books, films and music particularly may become a classic but a painting would more likely be called a masterpiece. A classic is often something old that is still popular.

The first known use of "classic" in this sense – a work so excellent that it is on the level of the "classics" (Greek and Latin authors) – is by the 18th-century scholar Rev. John Bowle. He applied the term to Don Quixote, of which Bowle prepared an innovative edition, such as he judged that a classic work needed.

Some other examples would be the 1876 novel The Adventures of Tom Sawyer by Mark Twain, the 1941 film Citizen Kane, and the 1956 song "Blue Suede Shoes" by Elvis Presley. Lists of classics are long and wide-ranging, and would vary depending on personal opinion. Classic rock is a popular radio format, playing a repertoire of old but familiar recordings.

A contemporary work may be hailed as an instant classic, but the criteria for classic status tend to include the test of time. The term "classic" is in fact often generalized to refer to any work of a certain age, regardless of whether it is any good. A cult classic may be well known but is only favored by a minority.

Pope Francis refers to a category of "religious classics": "certain writings [which] arose in a context of religious belief". In his 2015 encyclical letter, Laudato si', he calls on the world of empirical science to rediscover the meaning and enduring power which such classics can offer to a dialogue with science.

== Science and technology ==
A well known and reliable procedure, such as a demonstration of well-established scientific principle, may be described as classic: e.g. the Cartesian diver experiment.

== Consumer artifacts ==
Manufacturers frequently describe their products as classic, to distinguish the original from a new variety, or to imply qualities in the product – although the Ford Consul Classic, a car manufactured 1961–1963, has the "classic" tag for no apparent reason. The iPod classic was simply called the iPod until the sixth generation, when classic was added to the name because other designs were also available – an example of a retronym. Coca-Cola Classic is the name used for the relaunch of Coca-Cola after the failure of the New Coke recipe change. Similarly, the Classic, a transit bus manufactured from 1982–1997, succeeded an unpopular futuristic design.

A classic can be something old that remains prized or valuable (but not an antique). Classic cars, for example, are recognised by various collectors' organisations such as the Classic Car Club of America, who regulate the qualifying attributes that constitute classic status.

== Sport ==
Classic style is a technique in cross-country skiing

Many sporting events take the name classic:

- Horse races, e.g. British Classic Races
- Snooker tournaments e.g. the Wuxi Classic
- College Basketball e.g. the Charleston Classic
- Baseball
  - Major League Baseball All-Star Game e.g. the Midsummer Classic
  - Major League Baseball World Series e.g. the Fall Classic
  - World Baseball Classic
- National Hockey League, the Winter Classic.
- Cycling, the Classic cycle races

In Spanish-speaking countries, the term Clásico refers to a match between two football teams known as traditional rivals, e.g. El Clásico in Spain.

== See also ==
- Classic book
- Classical Hollywood cinema
- Classic stage (of American civilisations pre-Columbus)
- Design classic
- Classicism
- Chinese classics
- Protection of Classics
- Western canon
