= GAZ Chaika =

Luxury Russian limousine

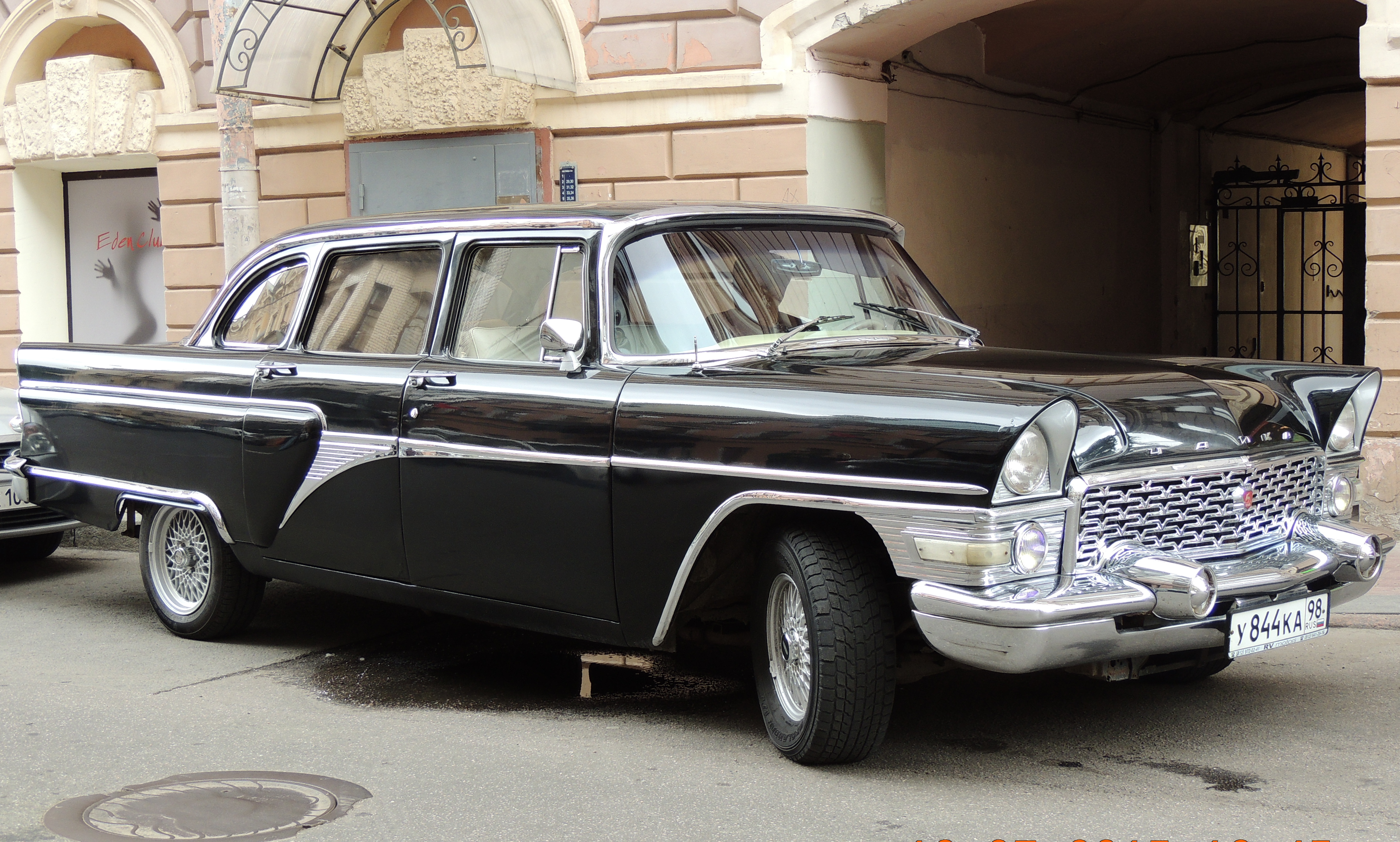
GAZ Chaika – American styled with the front closely resembling 1955-56 Packards

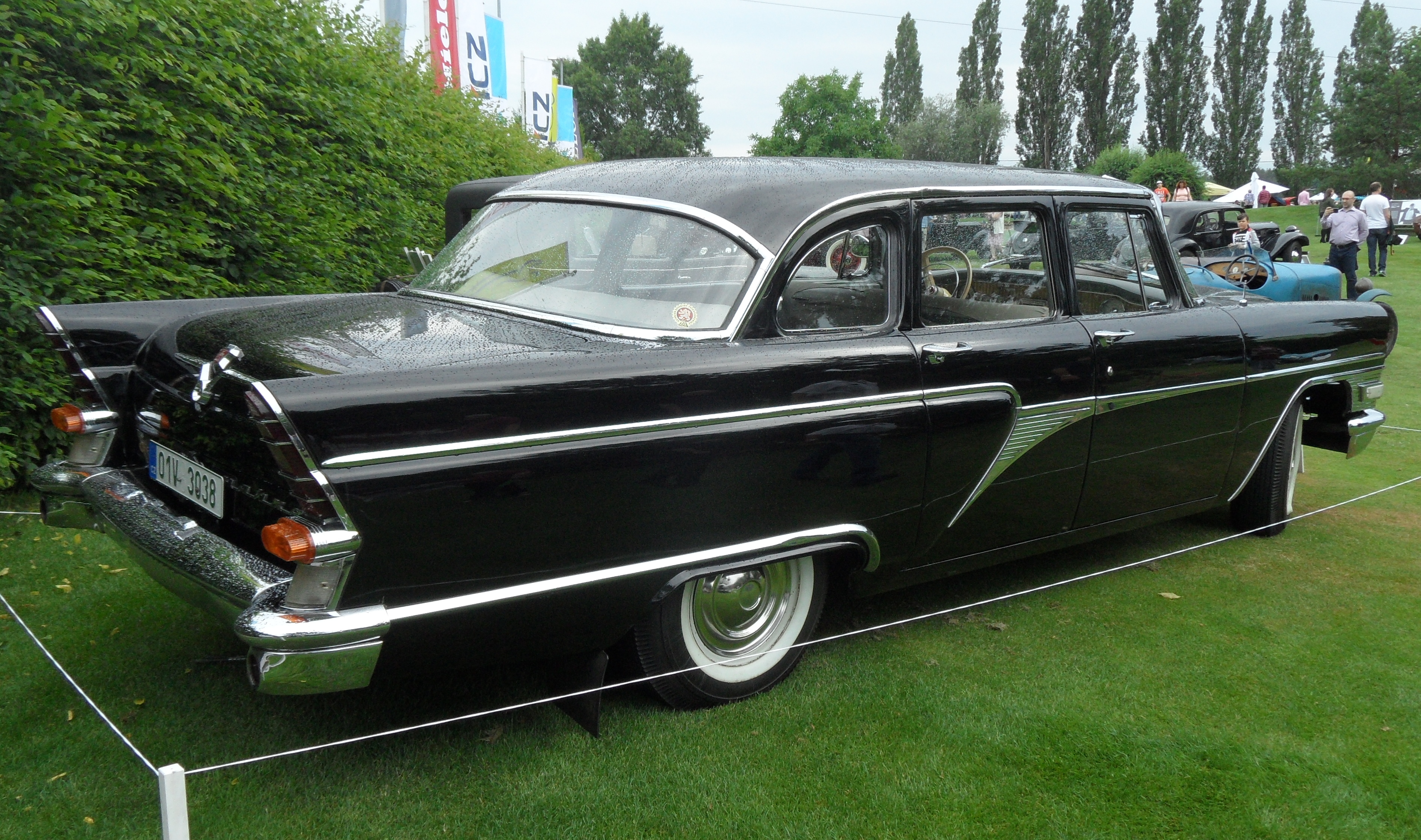
GAZ-13 Chaika limousine side / rear

The GAZ Chaika (Russian: Ча́йка), which means gull, is a luxury automobile from the Soviet Union made by GAZ (Gorkovsky Avtomobilny Zavod, translated as Gorky Automobile Plant (Russian: ГАЗ or Го́рьковский автомоби́льный заво́д)). The vehicle is one step down from the ZIL-111 limousine, and was produced in much larger numbers. Chaika production consisted of two generations, the GAZ-13 from 1959 to 1981 and the GAZ-14 from 1977 to 1988.

== GAZ-13 Chaika ==
The GAZ-13 Chaika debuted in 1958 and was exhibited internationally at the Brussels motor show. It was produced from 1959 to 1981, with a total of 3,179 built. The GAZ-13 was powered by a 195-hp SAE gross 5.5 L V8 and driven through a push-button automatic transmission of a similar design to the Chrysler TorqueFlite unit. It was offered as a saloon (GAZ-13), limousine (GAZ-13A), and four-door cabriolet (GAZ-13B) with an electrohydraulic top. The cabriolet was made in 1961 and 1962 for official parades. A station wagon version was also offered as a hearse or ambulance.

== GAZ-14 Chaika ==
The GAZ-13's styling had become antiquated by the 1970s, and it was succeeded by the more modern GAZ-14 Chaika introduced in 1977 (although production of both versions overlapped by several years). Although visually modern and fitted with the latest electronic luxury features, the GAZ-14 was in fact built around the drivetrain and undercarriage of the older model. Chaikas were mainly used by local governors, as the more luxurious ZiL were usually reserved exclusively for members of the Politburo, but in some cases it found its way up to the top, such as in Cuba where it was used by Fidel Castro.
