= GAZ-13 =

Russian automobile

GAZ-13 Chaika
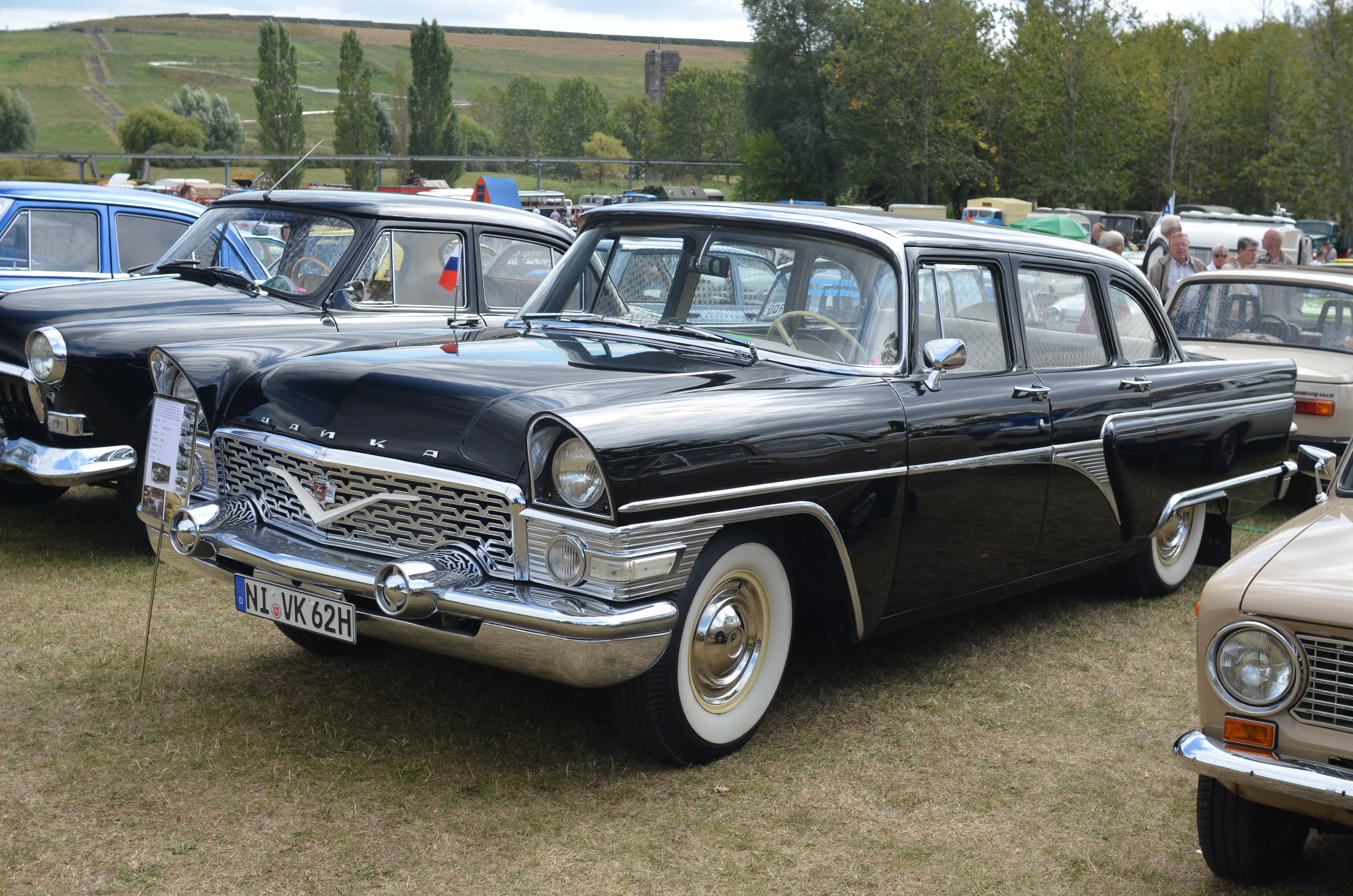

Overview
- Manufacturer: GAZ
- Production: 1959–1981 (first prototype made in 1955 or 1956)
- Assembly: Soviet Union: Gorky

Body and chassis
- Class: Full-size luxury car
- Layout: FR layout
- Related: Packard Patrician

Powertrain
- Engine: 5.5L ZMZ-13 V8
- Transmission: 3-speed automatic

Dimensions
- Wheelbase: 3,250 mm (128.0 in)
- Length: 5,600 mm (220.5 in)
- Width: 2,000 mm (78.7 in)
- Height: 1,580 mm (62.2 in)
- Curb weight: 2,050–2,190 kg (4,519–4,828 lb)

Chronology
- Predecessor: GAZ-12 ZIM
- Successor: GAZ-14

The GAZ-13 Chaika (Seagull) is an automobile which was manufactured by the Gorkovsky Avtomobilny Zavod (GAZ, Gorky Automobile Plant) from 1959 to 1981 as a generation of its Chaika marque. It is famously noted for its styling which resembled 1950s Packard Patrician.

== History ==
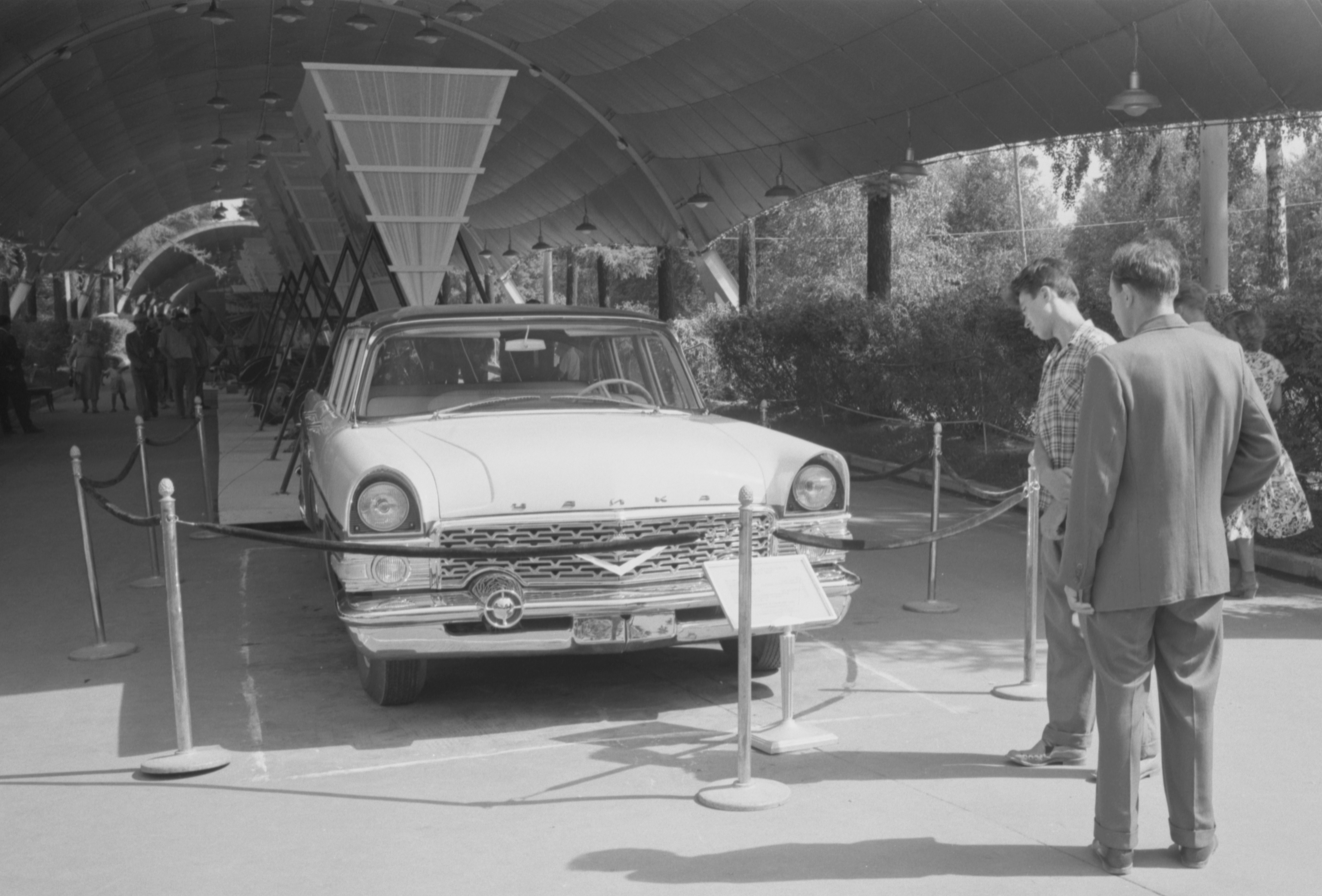
A Chaika on display at Sokolniki Park's USSR Exhibition in 1959

The GAZ-13 Chaika debuted in 1958. It was produced from 1959 to 1981, with 3,179 built in all. The GAZ-13 was powered by a 195-hp SAE gross 5.5 L V8 with a 4 barrel carburetor called the ZMZ-13 engine, and driven through a push-button automatic transmission of a similar design to the Chrysler PowerFlite unit. The engine was a relatively modern and reliable design for its time, and a modified version with a reduced compression ratio and smaller 2 barrel carburetor was used on the GAZ-53 truck, alongside the BRDM-2 military vehicle. It was offered as a saloon (GAZ-13), limousine (GAZ-13A), and four-door cabriolet (GAZ-13B) with an electrohydraulic top. The cabriolet was made in 1961 and 1962 for official parades.

RAF in Riga produced the GAZ-13A Universal, an estate, in the 1960s in Riga; this was also built as the GAZ-13S ambulance, as well as a hearse. Produced for a few years in the 1960s, it is the lowest-volume Chaika variant. Small numbers were also built for Mosfilm. As a limousine-class car, Chaikas were available only to the Soviet government, and could not be purchased by average citizens. However, citizens were allowed to rent Chaikas for weddings. Chaikas were used by Soviet ambassadors and Communist Party First Secretaries in East Germany, North Korea, Bulgaria, Hungary, Mongolia, China, and Finland, among others; Jiang Qing and Fidel Castro were given one each by General Secretary Nikita Khrushchev, who himself preferred the Chaika to his ZIL, and kept one at his summer dacha. He also presented one limousine version each to both King Sisavang Vatthana of Laos and Prime Minister, Prince Norodom Sihanouk of Cambodia on their visits to the Soviet Union. For their larger size and more powerful V8, Chaikas were also ordered in some quantity by the KGB. Top speed was 99 mph (159 km/h).

Most GAZ Chaikas were saloons. The convertible GAZ-13B was built in limited numbers for only two years, 1961 and 1962. The GAZ-13 was discontinued in 1981, subsequent to the 1977 debut of the succeeding GAZ-14 which continued to be built until the demise of the Chaika in 1988.

Pyotr Masherov, First Secretary of the Communist Party of Byelorussia, was killed in 1980 when the Chaika he was travelling in collided with a GAZ-53 truck carrying potatoes.

== Technical data ==
Engine	Power	Transmission	suspension
8-cylinder	220 hp SAE gross	3-speed	Front: independent with coil springs

== Gallery ==
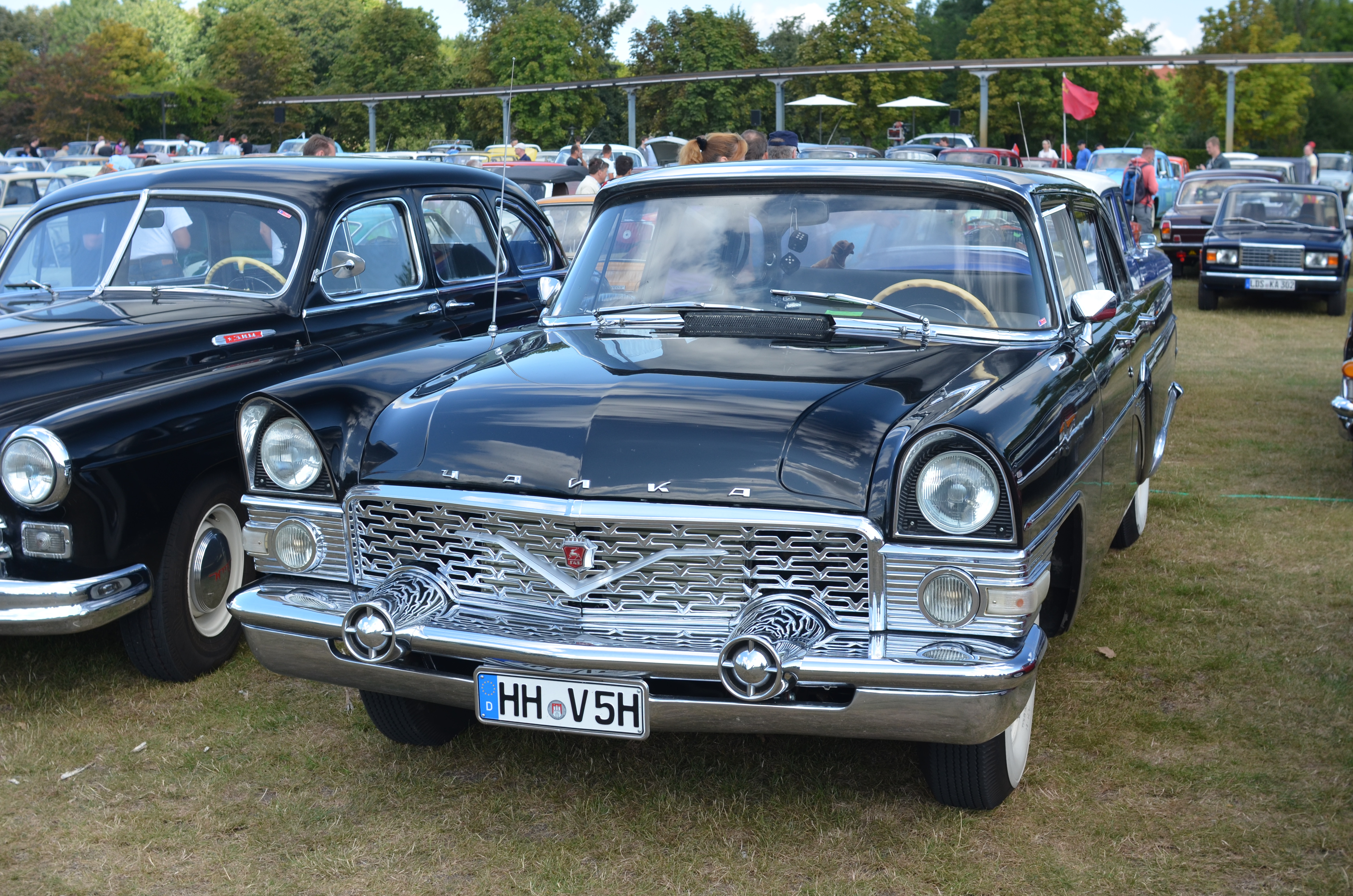
Front view

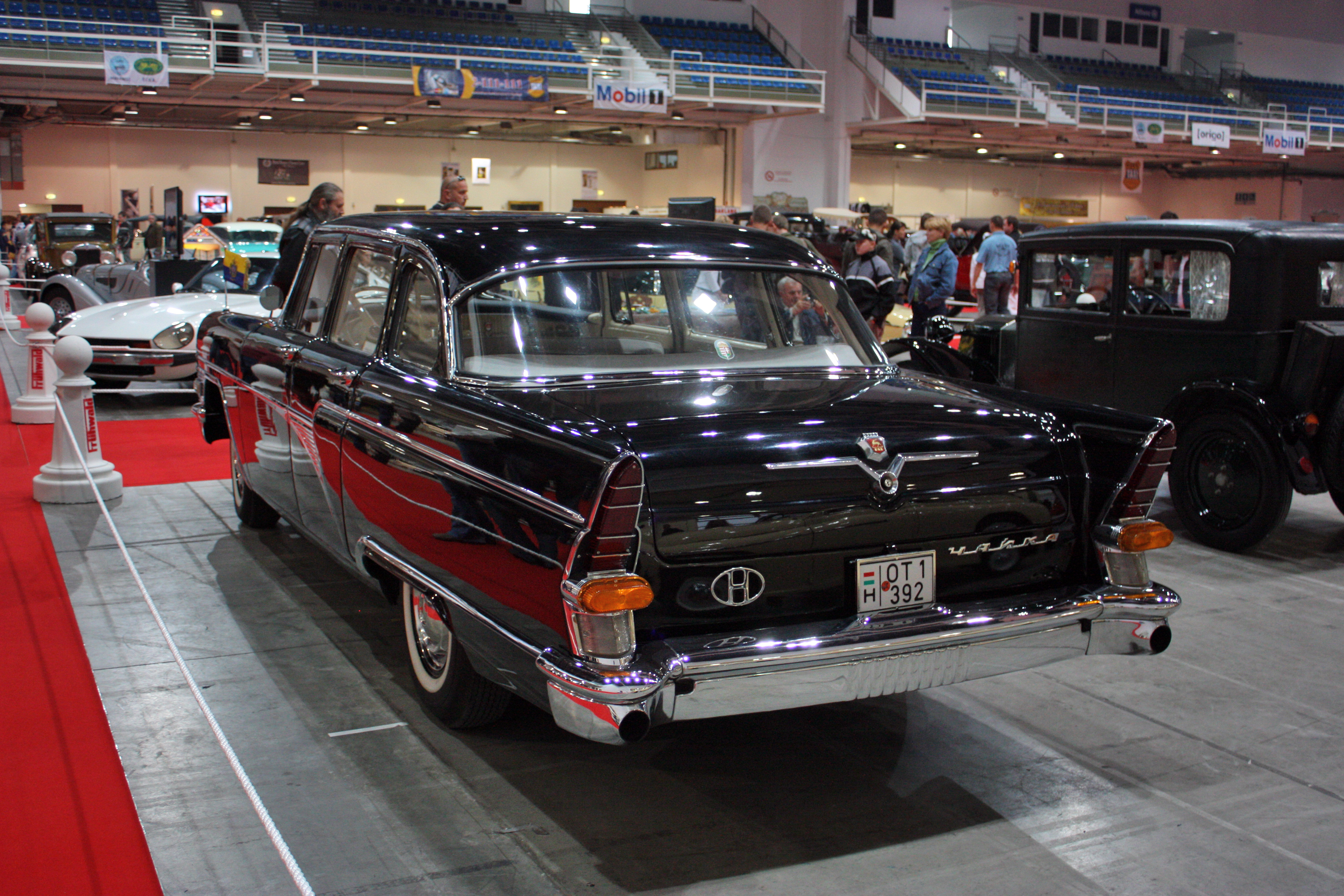
Rear view. Notice the tailpipe integrated in the rear bumper as well as the late-1950s American-style tailfins.

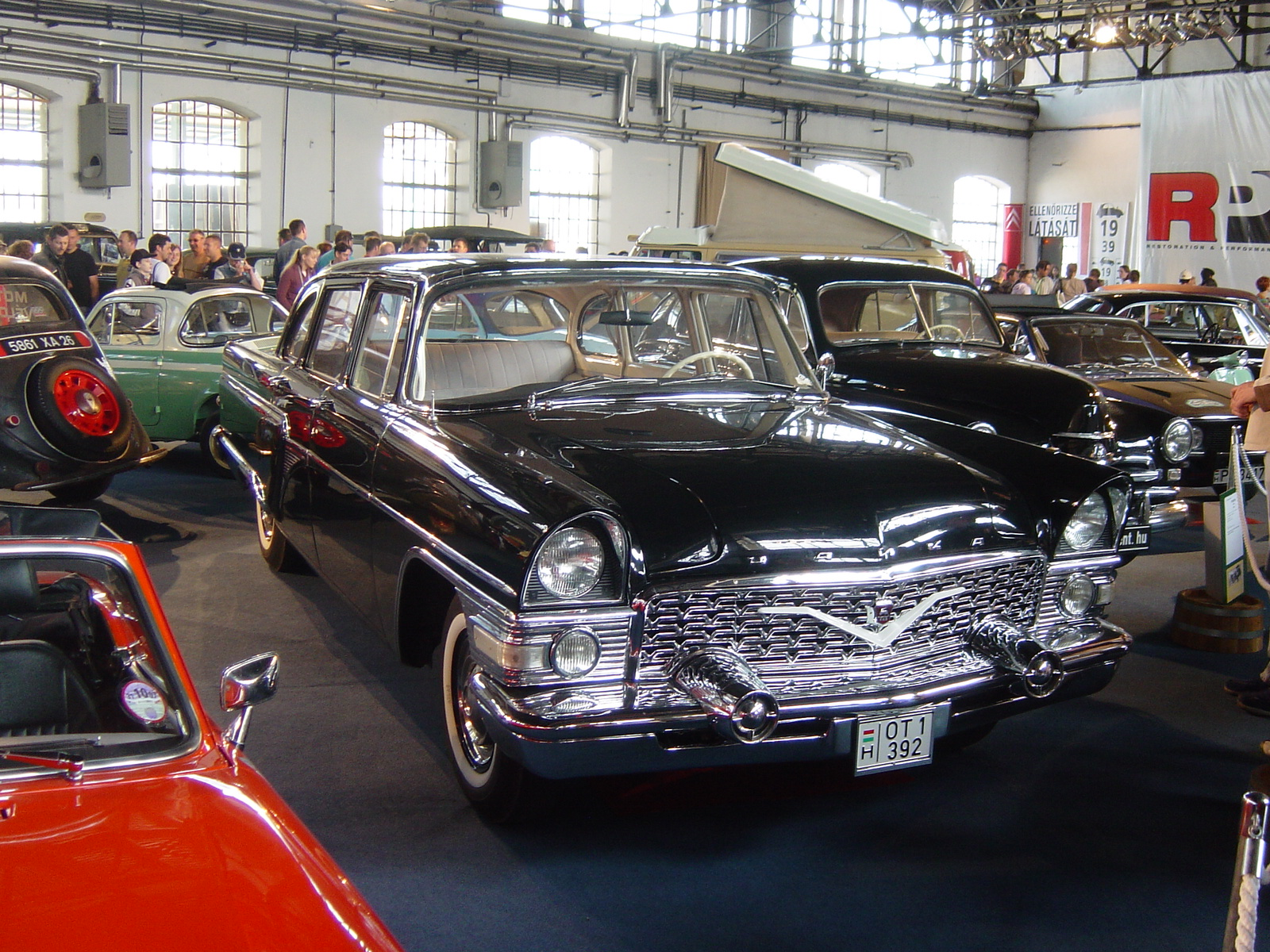
Sedan version

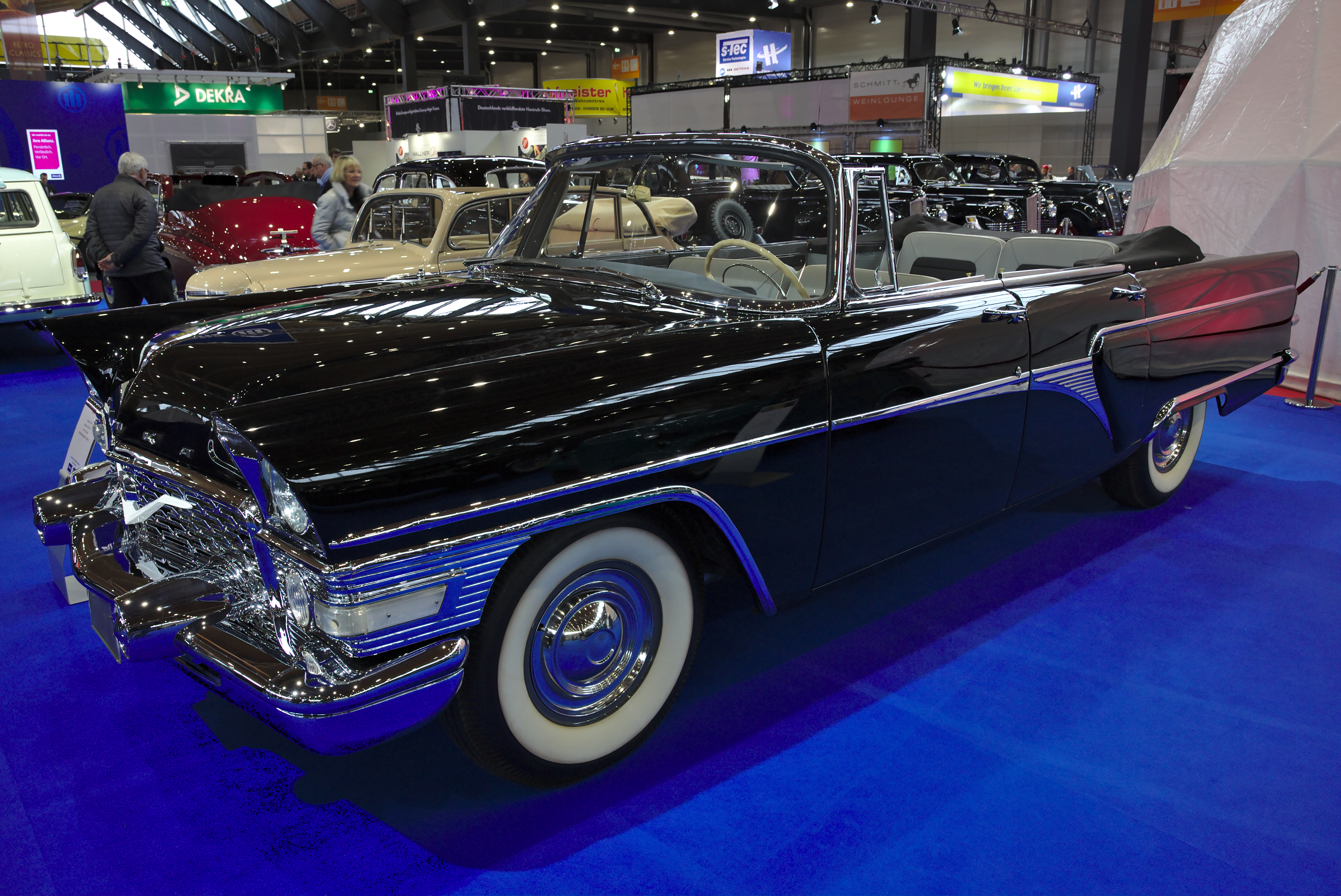
Cabriolet

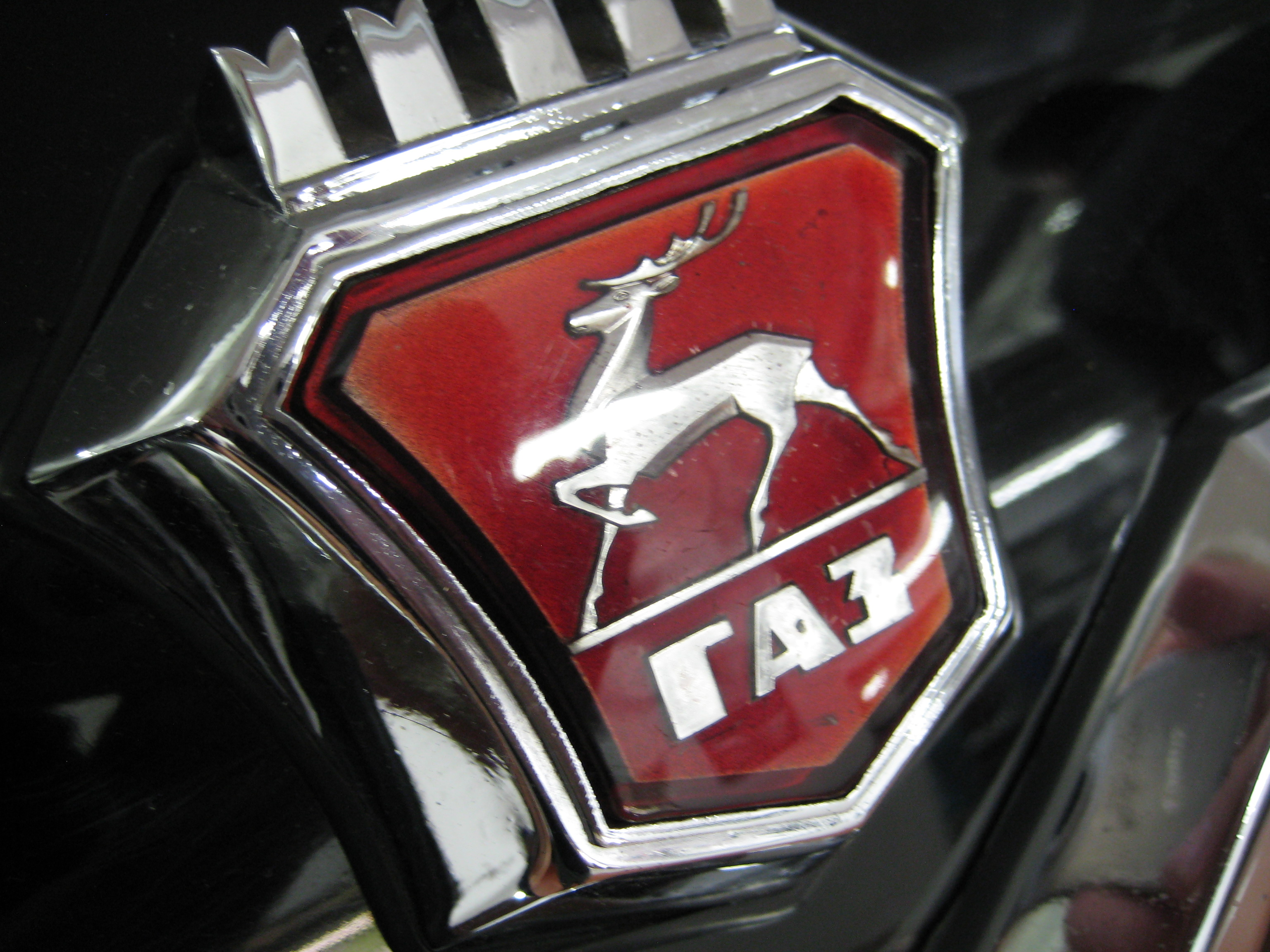
GAZ logo

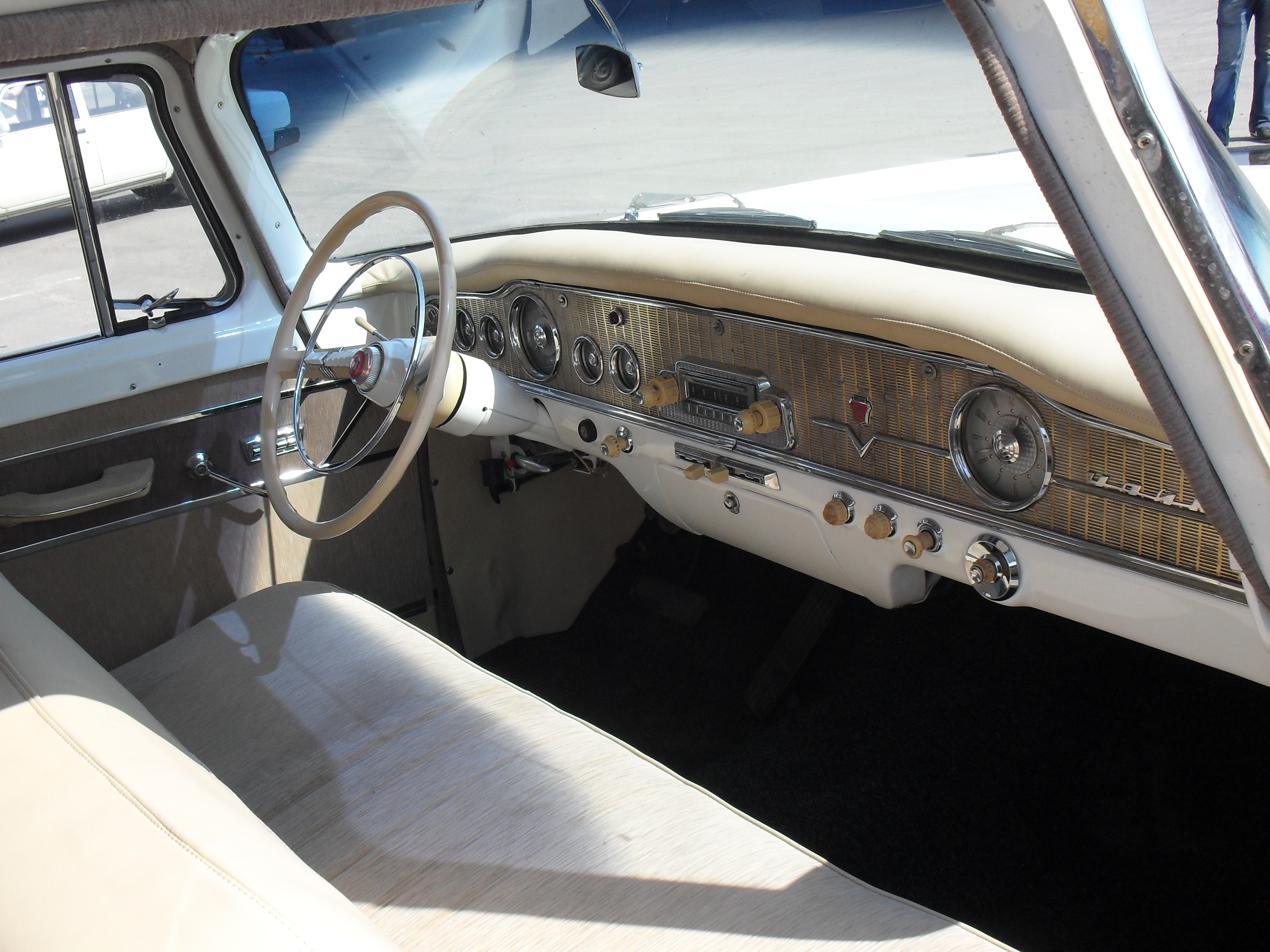
GAZ-13 interior
