= Amfibia =

Soviet watch

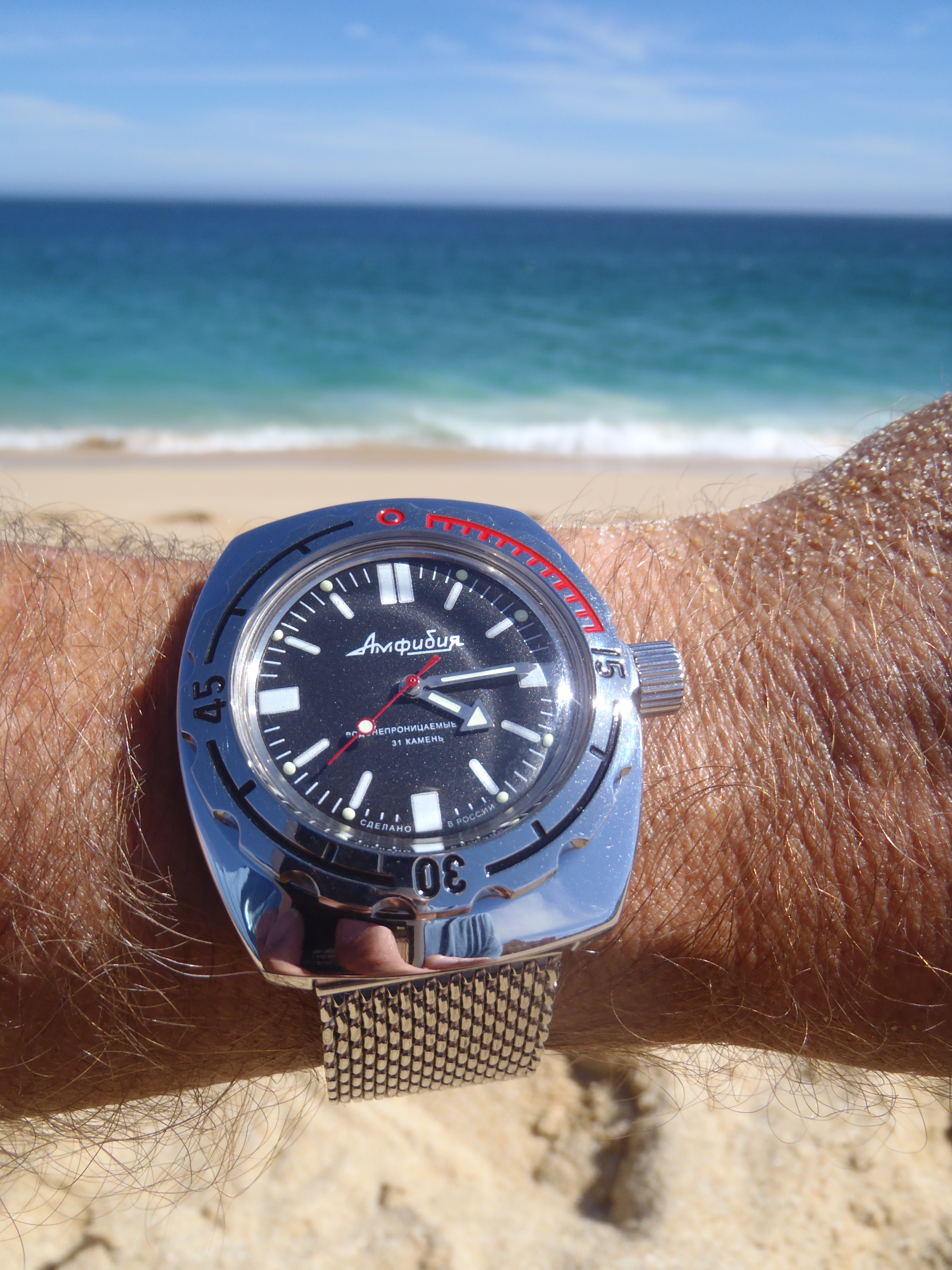
Modern Vostok Amphibia, model 090916

Amfibia (often spelled "Amphibia") is a Russian mechanical dive watch. It is available in both manual and automatic winding forms. The Amfibia was developed at the Vostok watch factory for the Soviet Ministry of Defense in 1967. It later gained worldwide popularity due to its reliable reputation and low cost. Writing for The Moscow Times in 2017, journalist Matthew Bodner noted that the Amfibia had become a major Russian cultural icon among international watch enthusiasts.

== History ==
The Amphibia creation was led by Vostok's chief of their new design bureau. The objectives were to create a watch that was competitive with contemporary diving watch such as the Blancpain 50 Fathoms, the Rolex Submariner and the watches using the compressor case, and to create a watch that could operate reliably at the temperature and pressure of 20 atmospheres (and later 30 atmospheres). The chief designers were Mikhail Fedorovich Novikov and Vera Fedorovna Belova.

According to Mikhail Novikov, the name “Amphibia” was chosen in a contest among the watch factory’s employees. It was named after the amphibians for their quality of being equally comfortable on land as in water.

On the way to creating the first Soviet diver watch, the developing team had to go through quite a lot of difficulties. Since similar foreign counterparts were patented it was impossible to simply copy them and everything had to be developed from scratch. The team had to design a special technology for glass, start manufacturing special rubber, and adapt to working with steel instead of brass.

In 1967 the first batch of the Amphibia watches rolled off the factory line; it could withstand 20 atmospheres of pressure. Due to the high popularity of the model, in the 70s, the factory together with GLAVCHASPROM started developing a new model that could be used by divers at 30 atmospheres. This new watch, that was named Nvch-30 (НВЧ-30: Наручные Водолазные Часы 30; translation: Divers Wrist Watch 30 ATM) had to go through a tough test in the field during a maritime exercise in the North Sea. The divers practiced submarine rescue while wearing these watches that could withstand pressure at depths up to 300m.

In 1975 a Soviet cosmonaut Georgy Grechko wore the Amphibia watch during the Soyuz 17 mission to the Salyut 4 space station which led to the even higher popularity of Amphibia watches among people all over the world.

== Design ==
=== Amphibia Vostok ===
The Amphibia uses the outside pressure to create the seal needed to prevent water from entering the case. The further the case sinks, the higher the outside pressure, the higher pressure is exerted on the case, creating a dynamically tighter seal. This is opposed to the idea where you create a case that creates the pressure to withstand 20 ATM of pressure no matter what pressure it experiences (1 ATM at sealevel, for instance). This is a design similar to the western compressor case, a patent for which was filed at least as early as 1954, and granted in 1956 The advantage of the compression design is that you do not need to tighten any of the seals to a pressure that would withstand 20 ATM, it also eliminates several pieces required to create such a seal.

The Amphibia's crystal is 3 mm thick lucite (50% thicker than standard) that is individually cut to a high level of precision. The lucite deforms elastically by a half millimeter under pressure, creating an effective seal between the crystal and the watch case, whereas the slightest deformation of a glass or sapphire crystal would simply crack it. This allows a much lighter, smaller and cheaper crystal to be used. It also does not require the extra rubber seals and a very high-pressure crystal retaining ring.

While a traditional caseback gasket would experience shear forces with the rotation of a screwback case used for a traditional hermetic case that would leave the gasket permanently compressed, making it unable to return to its original shape and unsuitable for reuse, the Amphibia uses a very wide sintered gasket. This solved a problem found during the design where when surfacing, the gasket which had been compressed by 20-30% decompressed slower than the pressure on the caseback, critically weakening the seal. To fix the problem of the O-Ring shear, they used a bayonet mount held in place by a nut. This use of a very large gasket distributes the force of the pressure which can be a problem with O-rings.

The case is made of stainless steel. The thickness of the caseback is 1 mm, double the regular thickness. The crown screws down with a gasket to prevent water from entering from the stem opening. The stem incorporates a clutch to protect it from lateral forces. This clutch gives the stem a wobbly feel as it doesn't engage unless you pull the crown away from the watch.

The watch includes a rotating bezel which is used to mark the time you first submersed. The dial and hands are luminescent so that the watch can be read in the darkness of ocean depths. However, this luminescence is significantly weaker and of shorter duration than on comparable Japanese and Swiss watches.

=== Amphibia Raketa ===
There have been a few designs of Raketa's Amphibian watches. The first versions were much larger than the Vostok Amphibia, featuring a 45 mm wide case. Subsequent designs had smaller cases (40mm). Raketa Amphibians were produced in small batches (according to some accounts, 15,000 pieces per year) and were characterized by several design flaws. The documentation provided with the watches claimed that the maximum allowed depth was 100 m.

=== Amphibia Poljot ===
Poljot Watch Factory introduced its own design of a diver watch in 1972.

== Evolution ==
=== Amphibia Vostok ===
The Amphibia was first equipped with the Vostok 2209 movement, a manual wind movement with no calendar. Later models used the Vostok 2409 and 2414 which added a date complication, and the 2416 which is an automatic movement. The dateless version of the 2416, the 2415 was used in the reissue of the 1967 Amphibia.

There was a problem including traditional built-in lugs with the new stainless steel Amphibia case, so for the first case design, model 350, fixed lugs were added on. Later versions included attached lugs that swung before they incorporated integral lugs to the case. This was followed by the tonneau (171), which featured a barrel-shaped case and integrated, shrouded lugs. Other well-known cases include the 420, 110 and 150 cases, the hexagon case (470), the ministry case (710), the new curvy 060, and the modern tonneau (090).

Currently Amphibia line of watches (Classic) has eight different types of cases.

=== Amphibia Raketa ===
In the 1960s and 1970s the Raketa Amphibia was equipped with movement "Raketa 2609". In 2014, Raketa re-issued its Amphibian and equipped it with the new self-winding movement "Raketa 2615.

== Features ==
The modern Amphibias have:

Amphibia Raketa vs Vostok	Power reserve	Water resistance	Luminescence
Raketa	40 hours, self-winding automatic movement	40 ATM	Super luminova
Vostok	31 hours, self-winding automatic movement	20 ATM	Classic luminova

== Culture references ==
- A Vostok Amphibia was worn prominently by Steve Zissou (portrayed by Bill Murray) in the eponymous Life Aquatic with Steve Zissou.
- Some of the Amphibia dials include the outline of a diver. These have been nicknamed "Scuba Dude", the "Blue Scuba Dude" being one of the most iconic pieces.

== See also ==
- Raketa Watches
- Vostok watches
- Poljot Watches
