= Design classic =

Industrially manufactured object with timeless aesthetic value

A design classic is an industrially manufactured object with timeless aesthetic value. It serves as a standard of its kind and remains up to date regardless of the year of its design. Whether a particular object is a design classic might often be debatable and the term is sometimes abused but there exists a body of acknowledged classics of product designs from the 19th and 20th century. For an object to become a design classic requires time, and whatever lasting impact the design has had on society, together with its influence on later designs, plays large roles in determining whether something becomes a design classic. Thus, design classics are often strikingly simple, going to the essence, and are described with words like iconic, neat, valuable or having meaning.
