= Amphibious rat =

Amphibious rat may refer to:

- Amphinectomys savamis, the amphibious rat, of Peru
- Lundomys molitor, Lund's amphibious rat, of Uruguay and southern Brazil
- Nilopegamys plumbeus, the Ethiopian amphibious rat, of Ethiopia
