= GAZ-14 =

Soviet luxury automobile

GAZ-14 Chaika
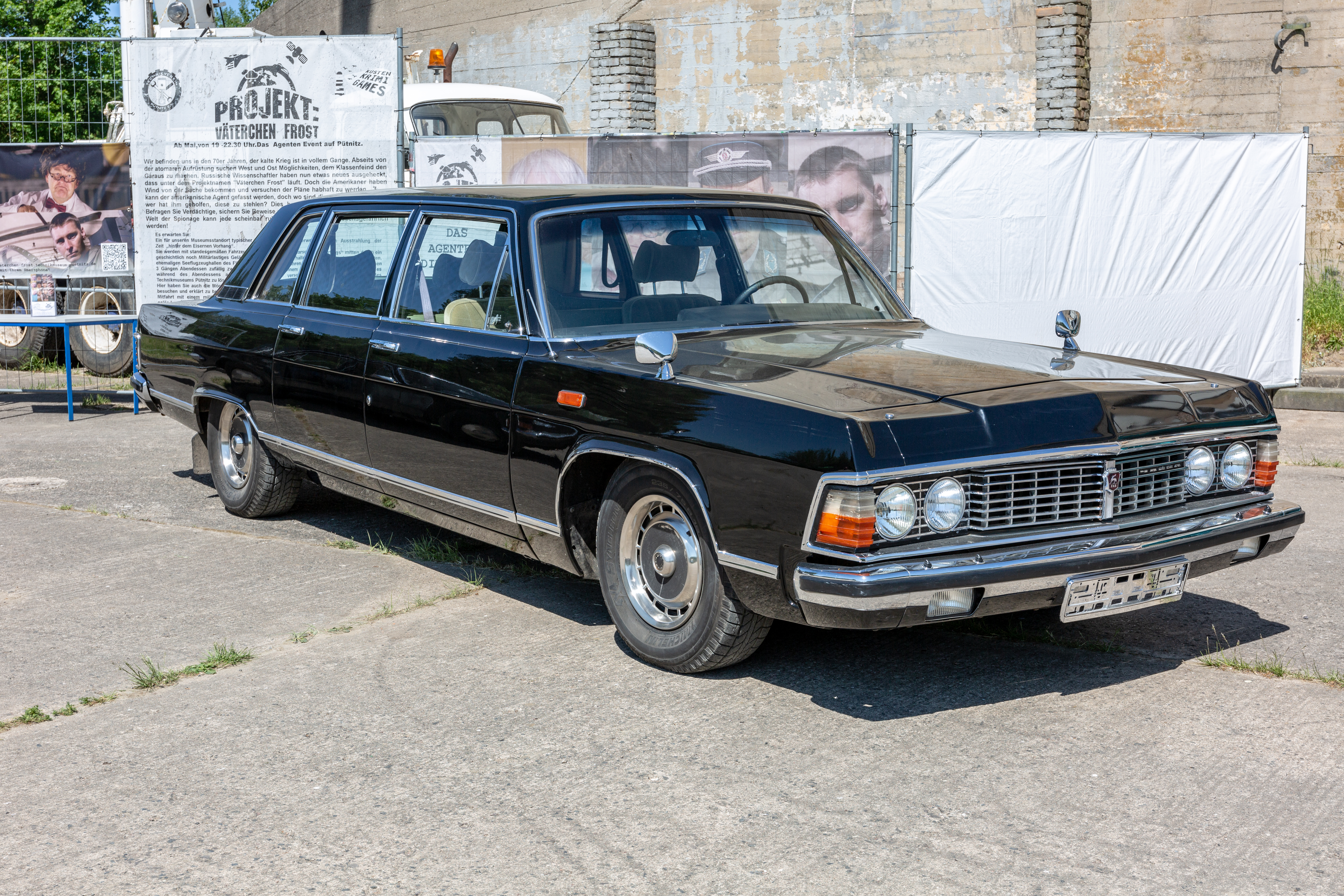

Overview
- Manufacturer: GAZ
- Production: 1977–1988 (first prototype dated as early as 1967)
- Assembly: Soviet Union: Gorky

Body and chassis
- Class: Full-size luxury car
- Layout: FR layout

Powertrain
- Engine: 5.5 L ZMZ-14 V8
- Transmission: 3-speed automatic

Dimensions
- Wheelbase: 3,450 mm (135.8 in)
- Length: 6,114 mm (240.7 in)
- Width: 2,020 mm (79.5 in)
- Height: 1,525 mm (60.0 in)
- Curb weight: 2,615 kg (5,765 lb)

Chronology
- Predecessor: GAZ-13 Chaika
- Successor: GAZ-3105

The GAZ-14 Chaika is an automobile manufactured by the Gorkovsky Avtomobilny Zavod (GAZ, Gorky Automobile Plant) from 1977 to 1988 as a generation of its Chaika marque.

== History ==
The vintage 1950s-style GAZ-13 was succeeded by the more modern GAZ-14 Chaika introduced in 1977 (although production of both versions overlapped by several years). Although visually modern and fitted with the latest electronic luxury features, the GAZ-14 was in fact built around the drivetrain and undercarriage of the older model. The GAZ-14 engine was a modernized 5,526 cc (337.2 cu in) equipped with twin four-barrel carburetors and achieved 220 PS (162 kW) SAE gross. A seven-seater, with special soundproofing, it measured 611 cm (241 in) long overall and weighed in at 2,600 kg (5,732 lb). A four-door convertible, the GAZ-14-05, appeared in 1982.

The GAZ-14 Chaika remained in production from 14 October 1977 to 1988, when the Chaika limousine brand was discontinued.

Around a hundred GAZ-14 were built each year, with total production (including units assembled in 1989 from spare parts) reaching 1,114. On orders from Mikhail Gorbachev, the blueprints and tooling were destroyed as part of his "fighting privileges" campaign under perestroika.

== Models ==
- GAZ-14: Original production version.
- GAZ-14-01 to GAZ-14-04: Modifications for various Soviet agencies, such as the KGB, Ministry of Defense, Central Committee of the CPSU and law enforcement.
- GAZ-14-05: Four-door convertible for military parades.
- GAZ-14-06:
- GAZ-14-07 (later GAZ-4106): Prototype modernized version of the Chaika. It featured a new 250 hp 5.5 liter ZMZ-504.10 fuel-injected V8, an upgraded automatic transmission and four-wheel disc brakes. Externally the only difference was a new grille and square headlights. Not produced due to discontinuation of the GAZ-14.
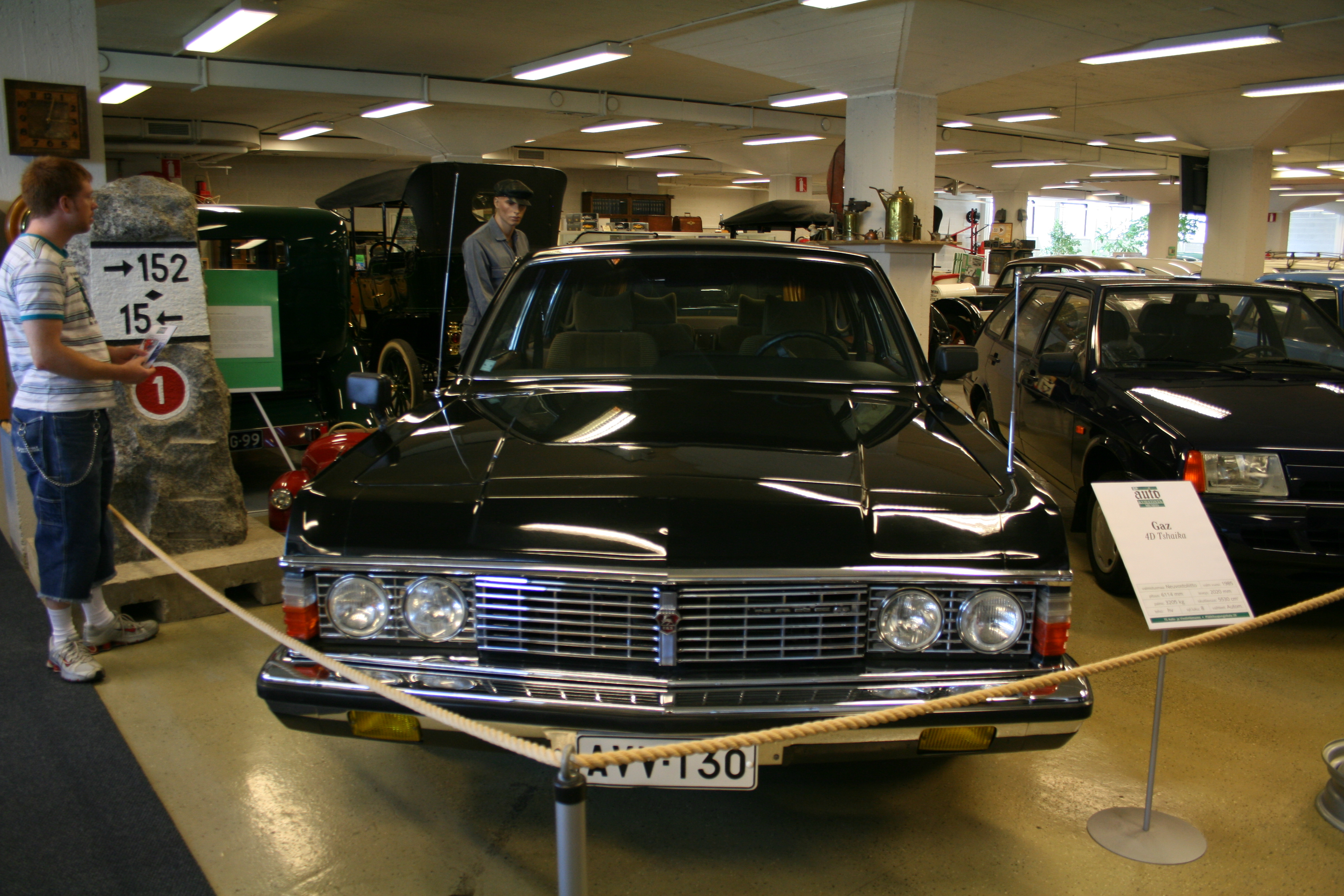
GAZ-14 "Chaika"

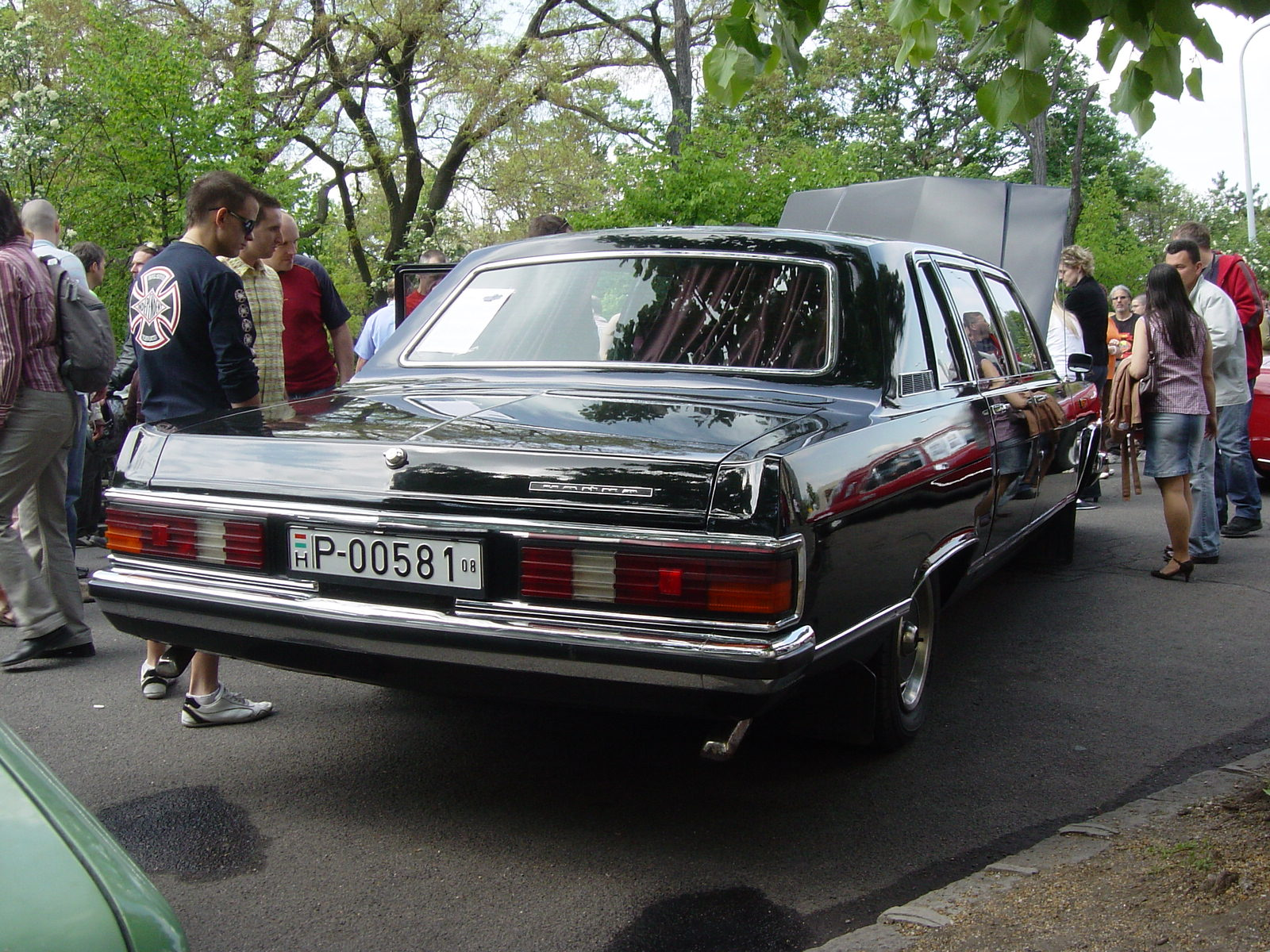
Rear view

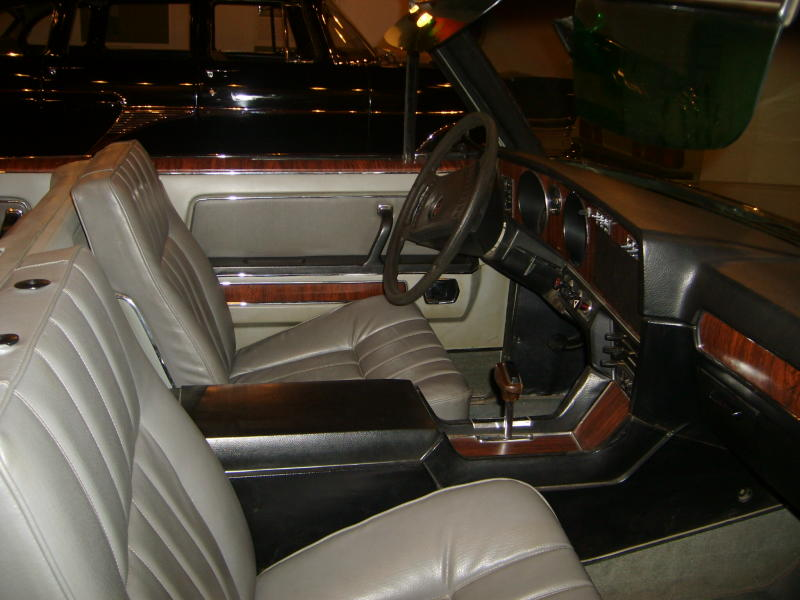
Interior

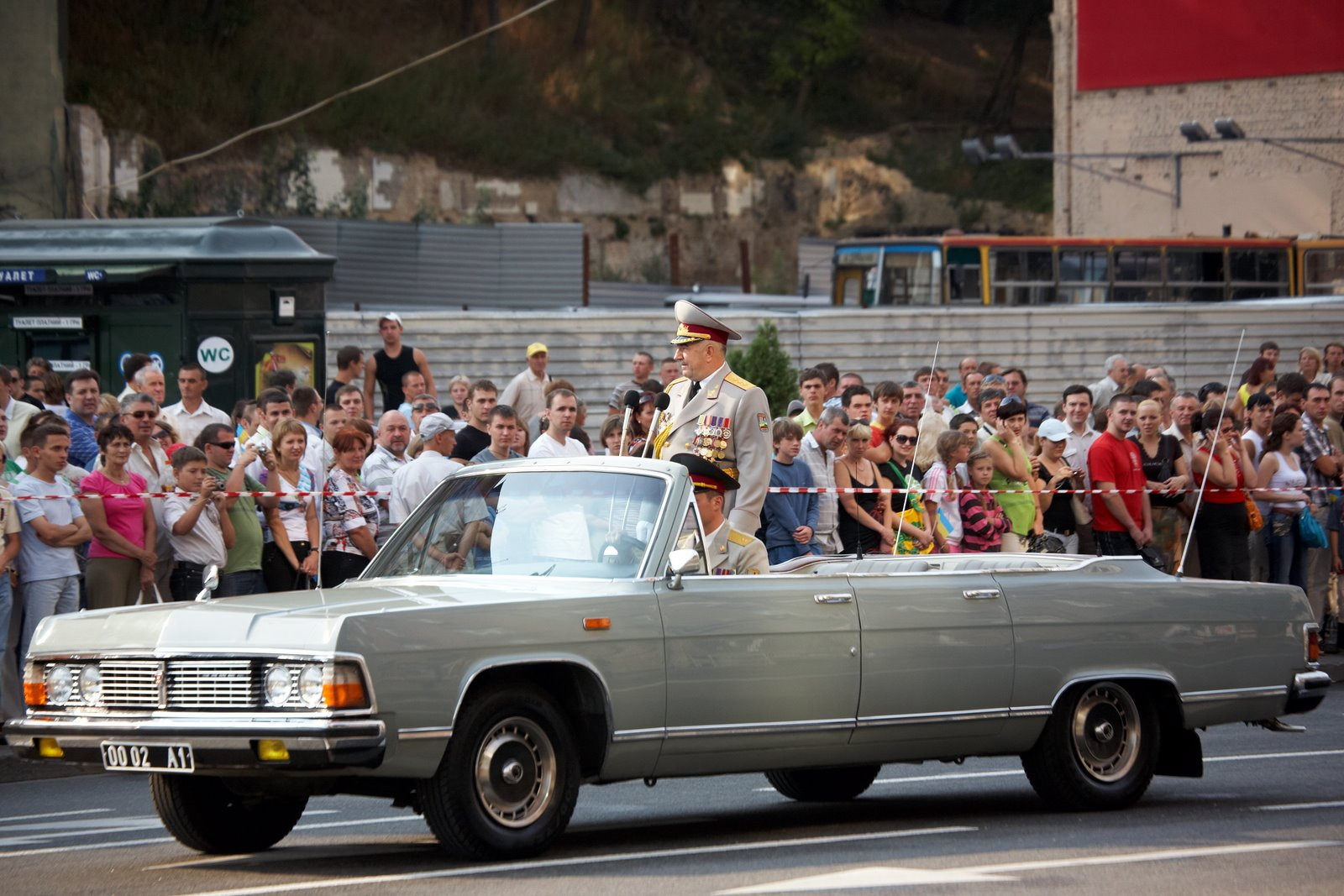
GAZ-14-05 "Chaika"

== Sources ==
- инженер Л. Шугуров. Представительские машины // журнал "Наука и жизнь", № 9, 1981. стр.110-113
