= Amphibian (disambiguation) =

An amphibian is a member of the class Amphibia of ectothermic, tetrapod vertebrates

Amphibian may also refer to:

- Amphibian (comics), two superheroes from Marvel Comics
- "Amphibian" (song), by Björk
- Amphibious vehicle, a vehicle that can operate on water or land
  - Amphibious aircraft, an aircraft for land, air, and sea
    - Loening OL or Loening Amphibian, an amphibious biplane built for the US Army Air Corps and Navy
- Mark IV Amphibian, a type of World War II period British rebreather
- AWC TM-Amphibian "S", integrally-suppressed variant of the Ruger MK II Target

== See also ==
- Amphibia (disambiguation)
- Amphibious (disambiguation)
