= Committee for State Security (Ukraine) =

Ukrainian Branch of the KGB

Committee for State Security of the Ukrainian Soviet Socialist Republic
- Камітэт дзяржаўнай бяспекі Беларускай ССР

Agency overview
- Formed: April 16, 1954
- Preceding agencies: Cheka of the Ukrainian SSR (1918–1922); GPU of the Ukrainian SSR (1922–1923); OGPU of the Ukrainian SSR (1923–1934); NKVD of the Ukrainian SSR (1934–1943); GUGB of the Ukrainian SSR (1934–1941/1941–1943); NKGB (February–July 1941/1943–1946) of the Ukrainian SSR; MGB of the Ukrainian SSR (1946–1953); MVD of the Ukrainian SSR (1953–1954)
- Dissolved: September 20, 1991
- Superseding agencies: Security Service of Ukraine; Foreign Intelligence Service of Ukraine
- Jurisdiction: Ukrainian Soviet Socialist Republic
- Agency executives: Vitali Nikitchenko, First Chairman; Nikolai Golushko, Last Chairman

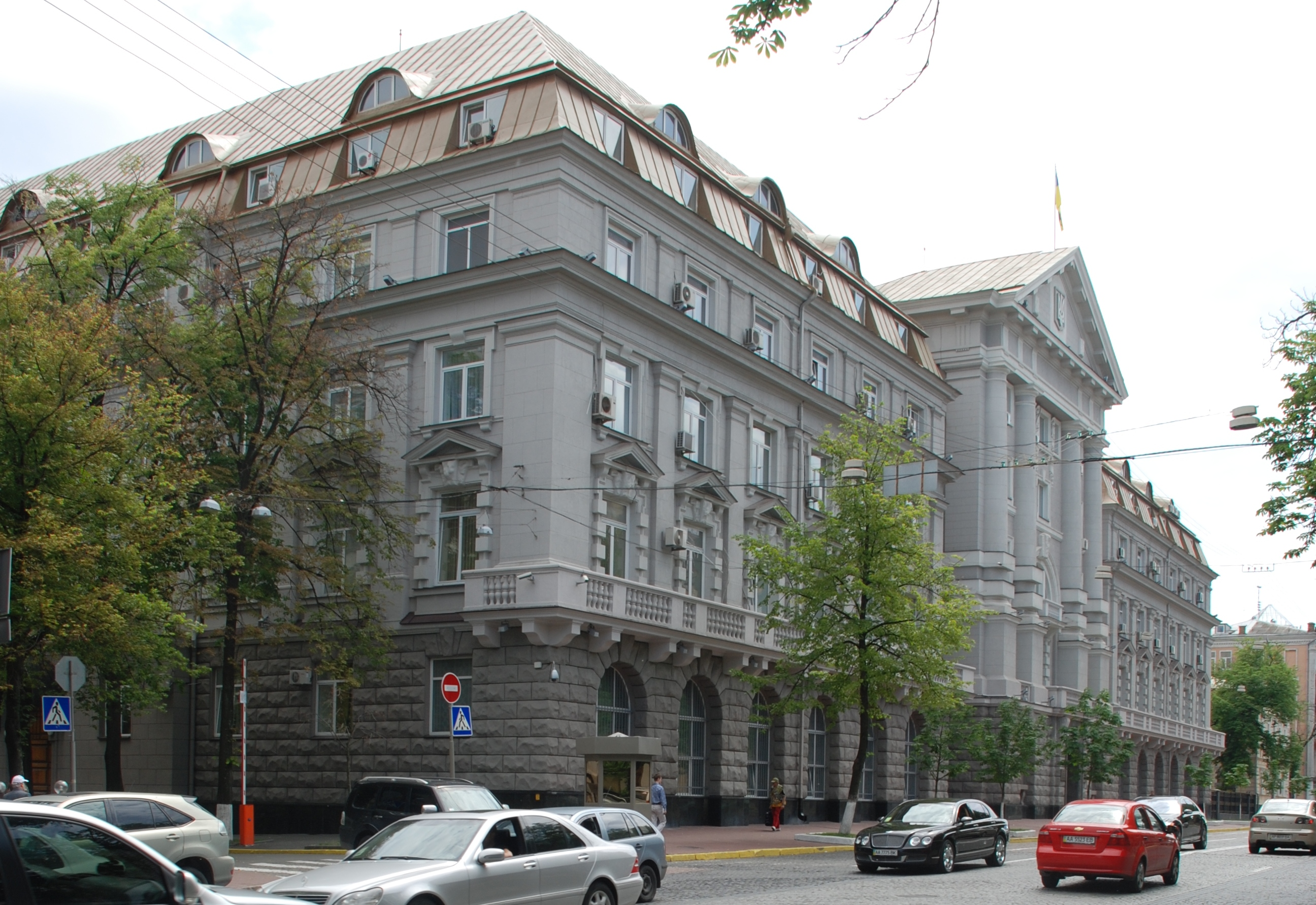
33 Volodymyrska Street; headquarters of the KGB Administration in Kyiv. Previously it was a building of the Land Administration Government (Zemskaya Uprava)

The KGB of the Ukrainian SSR (Ukrainian: Комітет державної безпеки УРСР, romanized: Komitet derzhavnoi bezpeky URSR) was a state committee of the Ukrainian Soviet Socialist Republic and a regional predecessor of the Security Service of Ukraine, a republican part of All-Union Committee for State Security. After the adaptation of the Constitution of the Ukrainian SSR (1978), it possessed a ministerial authority.

== History ==
Created on May 30, 1954, according to the ukase of Verkhovna Rada Presidium, the committee completely corresponded to the authority and organizational structure of KGB (created on March 13, 1954). Procedural powers of KGB, and its investigative jurisdiction were identified with adoption of the Criminal (1960) and the Criminal Procedural (1961) Codes of the Ukrainian SSR.

With the creation of the Security Service of Ukraine on September 20, 1991, the committee was dissolved according to the Verkhovna Rada statement "About creation of the Service of National Security of Ukraine".

According to the statement, the KGB of Ukraine was liquidated, while its employees, archives and documents were now under control of Security Service of Ukraine except for the technical divisions for encryption and communications, and the guard service. The encryption and communication service was subordinated to the Verkhovna Rada, while the guard service was transferred to the jurisdiction of the National Guard of Ukraine.

== Chairmen ==
=== Chairmen of Cheka of the Ukrainian SSR ===
- Isaak Shvarts (1918–1919)
- Aleksandr Rotenberg (1919)
- Vasiliy Mantsev (1919–1922)

=== Chairmen of GPU of the Ukrainian SSR ===
- Vasiliy Mantsev (1922–1923)

=== Chairmen of OGPU the of Ukrainian SSR ===
- Vasiliy Mantsev (1923)
- Vsevolod Balitsky (1923–1931)
- Stanislav Redens (1931–1933)
- Vsevolod Balitsky (1933–1934)

=== People's Commissars of Internal Affairs of the Ukrainian SSR ===
- Vsevolod Balitsky (1934–1937)
- Vasily Ivanov (1937)
- Izrail Leplevsky (1937—1938)
- Aleksandr Uspensky (1938)
- Amayak Kobulov (1938–1939)
- Ivan Serov (1939–1941)

=== People's Commissars for State Security of the Ukrainian SSR ===
- Pavlo Meshyk (1941)

=== People's Commissars of Internal Affairs of the Ukrainian SSR ===
- Vasyl Serhiyenko (1941–1943)
- Vasyl Riasnoy (1943)

=== People's Commissars for State Security of the Ukrainian SSR ===
- Sergey Savchenko (1943–1946)

=== Ministers of State Security of the Ukrainian SSR ===
- Sergey Savchenko (1946–1949)
- Mykola Kovalchuk (1949–1952)
- Pyotr Ivashutin (1952–1953)

=== Ministers of Internal Affairs of the Ukrainian SSR ===
- Pavlo Meshyk (1953)
- Timofei Strokach (1953–1954)

=== Chairmen of the KGB under the Council of Ministers of the Ukrainian SSR ===
- Vitali Nikitchenko (April 16, 1954 – July 16, 1970)
- Vitali Fedorchuk (July 16, 1970 – May 26, 1982)
- Stepan Mukha (May 26, 1982 – 1987)
- Nikolai Golushko (1987 – September 20, 1991)

== See also ==
- State Committee of the Soviet Union
- State Security Committee of the Republic of Belarus
- KGB
