= List of ministers of internal affairs (Ukraine) =

A list of ministers of internal affairs of historical states located on the territory of what is now Ukraine.

== Ukrainian People's Republic ==
The ministers of foreign affairs of the Ukrainian People's Republic:

- Volodymyr Vynnychenko June 28, 1917 – January 30, 1918 (at first as a secretary of the Russian Provisional Government later as an independent Ministry)
- Pavlo Khrystiuk January 30, 1918 – February 1918
- Mykhailo Tkachenko February 1918–April 29, 1918

== Ukrainian State ==
- Oleksandr Vyshnevskyi April 30, 1918–May 4, 1918
- Fedir Lyzohub May 4, 1918–July 5, 1918
- Ihor Kistiakivskyi July 5, 1918–October 24, 1918
- Mykola Vasylenko November 14, 1918-December 14, 1918

== West Ukrainian People's Republic ==
- Lonhyn Tsehelsky November 9, 1918 - January 4, 1919

== Ukrainian People's Republic (restored) ==
- Anatolii Pisotskyi 14-26 December, 1918
- Oleksandr Mytsiuk December 26, 1918–February 12, 1919
- Hryhorii Chyzhevskyi February 14, 1919–April 9, 1919
- Isaak Mazepa April 9, 1919–May 3, 1920
- Oleksandr Salikovskyi May 26, 1920–March 18, 1821 (in exile)

== Soviet Ukraine ==
=== People's Commissars of Internal Affairs ===
- Yevgenia Bosch December 30, 1917 – March 1, 1918 (acting Prime-Minister)
- Yuriy Kotsiubynsky March 7, 1918 – April 18, 1918 (government disbanded)
- Vasiliy Averin November 28, 1918–January 29, 1919 (as the Temporary Workers'-Peasants' Government)
- Kliment Voroshilov January 29, 1919-June 7,1919 (as part of the Russian Narkom)
- Hryhorii Kolos February-March, 1920
- Christian Rakovsky March - May 9, 1920
- Vladimir Antonov May 9, 1920 - April 1921
- Pavel Kin April 13 - July, 1921
- Mykola Skrypnyk July 19, 1921–February 1922
- Vasiliy Mantsev March 22, 1922–August, 1923
- Ivan Nikolayenko August-December, 1923
- Sergey Buzdalin December, 1923–March, 1924
- Vsevolod Balytsky March 1924–December 28, 1930 (ministry disbanded)
- Vsevolod Balytsky July 15, 1934–May 11, 1937
- Vasiliy Ivanov May 20 - June 14, 1937 (acting)
- Izrail Leplevsky June 14, 1937–January 25, 1938
- Oleksandr Uspensky January 25 - November 14, 1938
- Amayak Kobulov December 7, 1938–September 2, 1939 (acting)
- Ivan Serov September 2, 1939–February 25, 1941
- Vasyl Serhiyenko February 26, 1941–July 29, 1943
- Vasyl Riasnoy July 29, 1943 - January 16, 1946

=== Ministers of Internal Affairs ===
- January 16, 1946–March 19, 1953 Tymofiy Strokach
- March 19, 1953–June 30, 1953 Pavlo Meshik
- July 3, 1953–May 31, 1956 Tymofiy Strokach
- August 10, 1956–April 9, 1962 Oleksiy Brovkin
- April 9, 1962–June 16, 1982 Ivan Holovchenko
- June, 1982–July, 1990 Ivan Hladush
- October 23, 1990–August 24, 1991 Andriy Vasylyshyn
