= Operation Spring (disambiguation) =

Operation Spring was an offensive operation of the Second World War conducted by II Canadian Corps during the Normandy campaign in 1944 Operation Spring may also refer to:

- Operation Vesna (1948), Soviet mass deportation from Lithuania
- Vesna Case (1930-1931), Soviet purge of the Red Army from the former Tsarist officers serving there
- Operazione Primavera, an offensive of the Greco-Italian War in 1941
