= Alexander Uspensky =

Alexander Uspensky may refer to:

- Alexander Uspenski (born 1987), Russian figure skater
- Alexander Ivanovich Uspensky (1902–1940), leader of the Cheka, the GPU and the NKVD
