= Deribas =

Deribas may refer to:

- Terenty Deribas (1883–1938), Soviet official
- José de Ribas (Osip Mikhailovich Deribas) (1749–1800), founder of Odessa
