= Ivan Hladush =

Ukrainian politician (1929–2018)

Minister of Interior of UkrSSR
- In office 14 June 1982 – 26 July 1990
- Preceded by: Ivan Holovchenko
- Succeeded by: Andriy Vasylyshyn (as Minister of Ukraine)

Personal details
- Born: 24 July 1929 Mishuryn Rih, Verkhnodniprovsk Raion, Dnipropetrovsk Okruha, USSR
- Died: 6 December 2018 (aged 89) Kyiv, Ukraine

Military service
- Allegiance: Soviet Union
- Branch/service: Militsiya
- Rank: General of Interior Service

Ivan Hladush (Ukrainian: Іван Дмитрович Гладуш; Russian: Иван Дмитриевич Гладуш, Ivan Dmitrievich Gladush; 24 July 1929 – 6 December 2018) was a Ukrainian militsiya general.

== Early life and education ==
Hladush was born on 24 July 1929 in the village of Mishuryn Rih, Verkhnodniprovsk Raion, Dnipropetrovsk Okruha (today in Dnipropetrovsk Oblast). In 1951 he graduated from the Dnipropetrovsk Autotransportation Technicum.

== Career ==
Hladush started out in 1951 as an inspector at the State Auto Inspection (GAI). In 1957 Hladush graduated from the All-Union Extramural Engineering Institute in Moscow. In 1963 he was in charge of GAI at the Directorate of General Order Security in Dnipropetrovsk Oblast. In 1968–1974 Hladush headed the Directorate of General Order Security in Dnipropetrovsk Oblast. During that period he graduated from the Kyiv College of Ministry of Interior Affairs of USSR (today National Academy of Interior Affairs of Ukraine) in 1970 and in 1973 he was granted the rank of major general of Militsiya.

In 1974–1977 Hladush was a chief of Directorate of Interior Affairs in Donetsk Oblast. In 1982–1990 he was a minister of Internal Affairs of UkrSSR. In January 1991 Hladush retired as a Colonel General of Militsiya. In 2010 he was awarded a rank of General of Internal Service by the President of Ukraine Viktor Yanukovych.

In April 1988 Ivan Hladush as a minister of Interior headed a government commission in regards to recent findings in woodlands around Darnytsia. The commission came up with its report announcing that Soviet people were killed in Bykivnia by Nazi-Fascist invaders. It was partially true as there was Darnytsia concentration camp in close vicinity. Later another commission confirmed that Bykivnia was hiding much more.

== Family ==
- Viktor Hladush, People's Deputy of Ukraine, Ambassador of Ukraine to Baltics states

== Awards ==
- Fort-12 as "Firearm of Honour" (1997)
- Order of Merit (3rd degree, 1999)
- Order of Prince Yaroslav the Wise (5th degree, 2004)
- Order of Bohdan Khmelnytsky (3rd degree, 2008)
- Soviet awards orders of Red Banner, Red Banner of Labour, Badge of Honour

== See also ==
- Bykivnia graves
