= Aleksei Brovkin =

Soviet-Ukrainian general (1906–1983)

Minister of Interior of UkrSSR
- In office 10 August 1956 – 9 April 1962
- Preceded by: Timofei Strokach
- Succeeded by: Ivan Holovchenko

Personal details
- Born: Aleksei Nikolayevich Brovkin; 23 February 1906 Putyvl, Putivlsky Uyezd, Kursk Governorate, Russian Empire
- Died: 1 April 1983 (aged 77) Kiev, Ukrainian SSR, Soviet Union
- Party: Communist Party of Ukraine

Military service
- Allegiance: Soviet Union
- Branch/service: Militsiya
- Rank: General of Militsiya of 3rd degree

Aleksei Nikolayevich Brovkin (Russian: Алексе́й Никола́евич Бро́вкин; 23 February 1906 – April 1983) was a Soviet and Ukrainian militsiya general.

== Biography ==
An ethnic Russian, Brovkin was born into the family of a stoker in Putyvl. He started his career as an intern at Verinsky Sugar Factory (Mykolayivka) and Sumy-Stepanivka Sugar Factory (Stepanivka), both located near Sumy. Later worked as a repairman at the Sumy Refined Sugar Factory. In 1930s worked at the Kharkiv Remmashtrest (a factory for repairing metal cutting machines) as director of some of its departments (design bureau, planning and production department) and later as chief engineer.

Just before World War II, in 1939 Brovkin became a chief of Directorate of Local Fuel Industry in Kharkiv Oblast. In 1941 he became a secretary of engineering at the Kharkiv city committee of the Communist Party of Ukraine. During the evacuation of Soviet government, Brovkin was appointed as secretary of engineering of the Communist Party committee in Kupiansk and then Kuibyshev. In 1942–1946 he was working in leading positions of the All-Union Communist Party in Nizhny Tagil.

Following liberation of the Ukrainian SSR from the Nazi Germany occupation, in 1946–1954 Brovkin returned to Ukraine working in leading position of the Central Committee of the Communist Party of Ukraine including deputy chief of engineering department, deputy minister of MGB of UkrSSR, and deputy chief of department for party, trade union and Komsomol agencies. In 1954–1968 he worked at the Ministry of Interior of UkrSSR as deputy minister (including as chief of Militsiya Directorate), minister (1956–1962) and rector of the Kiev College of Ministry of Interior (today National Academy of Internal Affairs).

In 1968 Brovkin retired, but not for long. In 1970–1977 he worked as an engineer for DerzhPlan (State Planning Committee of the UkrSSR). In 1977 Brovkin retired.
