= Ivan Holovchenko =

Soviet politician (1918–1992)

Minister of Interior (General Order Security) of UkrSSR
- In office 9 April 1962 – 16 June 1982
- Preceded by: Oleksiy Brovkin
- Succeeded by: Ivan Hladush

Personal details
- Born: 14 October 1918 Lyman Druhyi, Kupyansky Uyezd, Kharkiv Governorate, Ukrainian State
- Died: 9 November 1992 (aged 74) Kyiv, Ukraine
- Resting place: Baikove Cemetery
- Party: Communist Party of Ukraine
- Education: Communist Party College in Moscow
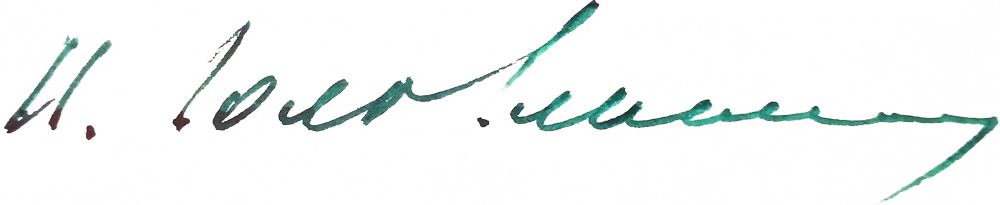
- Signature

Military service
- Allegiance: Soviet Union
- Branch/service: Militsiya, KGB
- Rank: Colonel General of Militsiya

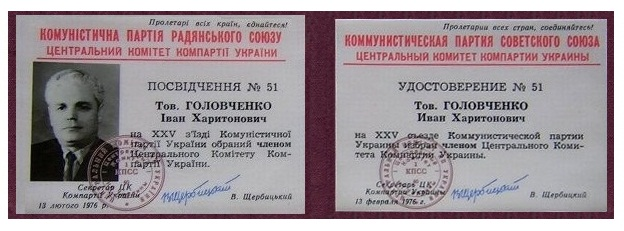
Party ticket

Ivan Holovchenko (Ukrainian: Іван Харитонович Головченко; Russian: Иван Харитонович Головченко, Ivan Kharitonovich Golovchenko; 14 October 1918 – 9 November 1992) was a Ukrainian militsiya general.

== Biography ==
Holovchenko was born on 14 October 1918 in village of Lyman Druhyi, Kupyansky Uyezd, Kharkiv Governorate (today in Kharkiv Oblast) at the time of the Ukrainian State. He graduated from Railway school in factory studies, later in Artemivsk (Bakhmut) he also finished preparatory courses of Komsomol laborers.

Holovchenko started out as a repairman at railway depot, later continued as Komsomol activist at various railway centers Artemivsk, Debaltseve, Popasna at the South-Donets Railways. In 1939, he became a member of the Communist Party of Ukraine.

During World War II at the start of the Nazi Germany aggression against the Soviet Union (so called the Great Patriotic War) Holovchenko served as an assistant to the chief of political department in Voroshylovhrad and in summer of 1942 he participated in evacuation of the Voroshylovhrad train station. For which, a few months later in Moscow, he received a medal "For Distinguished Labour" and a new appointment as an assistant to the chief of political department of Abdulino Railways.

Following liberation of Donbas area early in 1943, Holovchenko returned to Ukraine becoming the 3rd secretary of Komsomol in Voroshylovhrad Oblast (Luhansk Oblast) heading the organization's human resources administration. After returning from three years of studying in the Party College in Moscow (Russian: Высшая партийная школа, Vysshaya partiynaya shkola), in 1948 Holovchenko was appointed as one of secretaries of city committee of Communist Party in Kadiivka, heading the organization's human resources administration. Sometime later he was appointed as the first secretary of Communist Party committee in Krasnyi Luch. In 1952–1953 Holovchenko headed clerical division of Communist Party committee in Voroshylovhrad Oblast.

In 1953–1954 Holovchenko was the first secretary of Communist Party committee in Voroshylovhrad (Luhansk). In 1954-1955, he headed KGB in Voroshylovhrad Oblast.

In 1955–1962 Holovchenko was a deputy director of KGB in Ukraine. On 9 April 1962 he was appointed Minister of General Order Security of UkrSSR which since 1968 was turned back into Ministry of Internal Affairs of UkrSSR. That position he held until 16 June 1982 when he retired. Since 1967 Holovchenko also was a member of the Writers' Union of Ukraine.

As a head of Ministry of Interior (MVD), Holovchenko followed this principle, "the most important task in building communism is the education of people in the spirit of communist morality, the formation of a new person."
