= Vesna Case =

1930–1931 purge of the Red Army

The "Vesna" Case (Russian: Дело "Весна"), also Operation Vesna of 1930–1931 was a massive series of Soviet repressions targeting former officers and generals of the Russian Imperial Army who had served in the Red Army and Soviet Navy, a major purge of the Red Army preceding the Great Purge. According to over 3,000 group cases in Moscow, Leningrad and Ukraine, over 10,000 persons were convicted. In particular, in May 1931, in Leningrad alone over 1,000 persons were executed according to the so-called "Guards Case" (Russian: Гвардейское дело).

The Vesna case was briefly discussed in the 1998 book Трагедия РККА 1937—1938 ("Tragedy of the Red Army 1937–1938") by Oleg Suvenirov, but the major groundbreaking work on the case was the 2000 book "Голгофа русского офицерства в СССР 1930–1931 гг." by Ukrainian researcher Yaroslav Tinchenko. In 2016 the Russian journal Herald of an Archivist published an article that described the archived documents related to the Vesna Case.

== Background of the research ==
For a long time historians assumed that the destruction of the officer cadre of the Red Army happened during Stalin's Great Purge. However new data that emerged on the break of the 21st century radically changed this perception.

In 1958 the central directorate of KGB transferred to its Ukrainian SSR department 3,496 cases of criminal investigations against the former Tsarist officers in the Red Army carried out during 1930–1931, because the majority of them were related to Ukrainian SSR. However, for unknown reasons the batch included hundreds of cases concerning Moscow, Leningrad, and Voronezh.

After the collapse of the Soviet Union, Yaroslav Tinchenko with the help of the archivists of the Ukrainian security service got an insight into this classified information.

== History of the case ==
While the mass systematic arrests started in 1930, repressions against "former military" began much earlier. Initially the tsarist voyenspetses were fired, demoted, or transferred to military teaching positions. Initially arrests were only occasional, but their amount gradually increased. In 1929–1930 a major purge of the military industry was carried out.

In addition to the Vesna case, other repressions against former tsarist officers were carried out at the same time, often overlapping with "Vesna", such as the "Microbiologists case" (дело «контрреволюционной вредительско-повстанческой организации микробиологов, ветеринаров и бывших офицеров»).

A major instigator of the case was leader of the Ukrainian State Political Directorate (GPU) Izrail Leplevsky, apparently supported by Genrikh Yagoda. Other major Ukrainian "chekists" involved in the fabrication of the cases were Genrikh Lyushkov and Vsevolod Balitsky. Some others opposed the case after seeing the evidence of the fabrication in the documents. However Yagoda and Lazar Kaganovich appealed to Stalin himself, and he ordered to fire the GPU "dissidents".

In particular, several arrested gave evidence against general (later Marshal) Mikhail Tukhachevsky even during cross-examination in front of Stalin and other members of Politburo. Tukhachevsky was spared at that time, but still he was executed later, during the Great Purge.

== Notable convicts ==
Among others, arrested were Andrei Snesarev, А. Л. Родендорф, Alexander Svechin, Pavel Sytin, Ф. Ф. Новицкий, Aleksandr Verkhovsky, В. И. Галкин, Ю. К. Гравицкий, Vladimir Olderogge, В. А. Яблочкин, Е. Л. Слухоцкий, Nikolai Sollogub, А. А. Балтийский, Mikhail Bonch-Bruyevich, Н. А. Морозов, Aleksei Gutor, А. Х. Базаревский, Mikhail Matiyasevich, В. Ф. Ржечицкий, В. Н. Гатовский, П. М. Шарангович, Д. Д. Зуев, Nikolai Kakurin, И. А. Троицкий.
