= Pyotr Ivashutin =

Soviet Army General

- Пётр Ивашу́тин

Director of the Main Intelligence Directorate
- In office March 1963 – July 1987
- Preceded by: Ivan Serov
- Succeeded by: Vladlen Mikhailov

Acting Chairmen of the KGB
- In office November 5 – November 13, 1961
- Preceded by: Alexander Shelepin
- Succeeded by: Vladimir Semichastny

First Deputy Chairman the KGB
- In office 1954–1963

Minister of State Security of the Ukrainian SSR
- In office 1952–1953
- Preceded by: Mykola Kovalchuk
- Succeeded by: Pavlo Meshyk

Personal details
- Born: Pyotr Ivanovich Ivashutin; 18 September 1909 Brest-Litovsk, Russian Empire
- Died: 4 June 2002 (aged 92) Moscow, Russia
- Party: Communist Party of the Soviet Union
- Spouse: Maria Alekseevna
- Children: Yuri and Irina
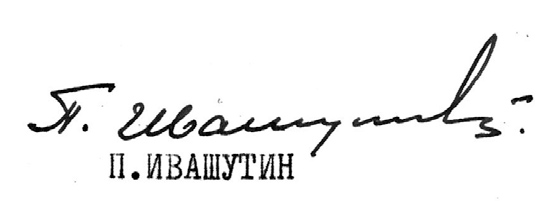
- Signature

Military service
- Allegiance: Soviet Union (1931–1991); Russia (1991–1992)
- Branch/service: Red Army; SMERSH; MGB; KGB; GRU
- Years of service: 1931–1992
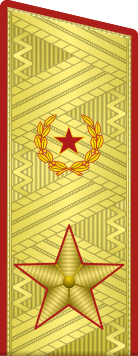
- Rank: Army General
- Battles/wars: World War II; Winter War; Eastern Front; Cold War; Operation Danube; Soviet–Afghan War

Pyotr Ivanovich Ivashutin (Russian: Пётр Ива́нович Ивашу́тин; 18 September 1909 – 4 June 2002) was a Soviet Army General and head of the state and military security organs, who was deputy chairman of the KGB (1954–1963), temporary acting head of the KGB in 1961 and the longest running head of the GRU.

== Biography ==
Ivashutin was born into the family of a railway worker. He graduated from a rabfak and joined the All-Union Communist Party (b) in 1931.

=== Pre-war service ===
Mobilized in Red Army in July 1931 by the party, he was called up and sent to military education; in 1933 he graduated from the 7th Stalingrad Military Aviation School. From 1933 he was an instructor pilot in the same military aviation school; from 1935 he was the commander of the crew of the TB-3 heavy bomber of the 45th air brigade of the Moscow Military District. In 1937 he was the commander of the TB-3 heavy bomber. From 1937 to 1939 he studied at the Zhukovsky Air Force Engineering Academy of the Red Army. From January 1939 Ivashutin began to work in the counterintelligence agencies of the Red Army. He served in the apparatus of the special department of the NKVD of the Western Military District; and from 1940 as the head of the special department of the NKVD of the 23rd Rifle Division in the Leningrad Military District. He participated in the Soviet-Finnish War.

=== Second World War ===
During the Great Patriotic War from May to October 1941 Ivashutin served as deputy head of the 3rd department of the OO of the Transcaucasian Front. From December 1941 he was Deputy Head of the Special Department of the NKVD of the Crimean Front. From June 1942 served in the same position on the North Caucasian Front; from September 1942 he was appointed Deputy Chief of the Public Organization of the Black Sea Group of Forces of the North Caucasian Front. From January 1943, Ivashutin became head of the SMERSH counterintelligence department of the 47th Army. From 29 April 1943 he was the head of the counterintelligence department SMERSH South-West; from October 1943 he worked on the 3rd Ukrainian fronts. He negotiated with representatives of the Romanian government about the withdrawal from Ukraine and from the war on the side of Nazi Germany.

=== Post-war service ===
From July 1945 Ivashutin became the head of the SMERSH counterintelligence department in the Southern Group of Forces, after 1946 this department was renamed the Counterintelligence Directorate of the Ministry of State Security for the same group of forces he remained in his post. From November 1947 he was Head of the Counterintelligence Directorate of the USSR Ministry of State Security for the Group of Soviet Forces in Germany. From November 1949 to January 1952 he was the chief of counterintelligence at the Ministry of State Security of the Leningrad Military District.

From December 1951 to August 1952 he was deputy chief of the 3rd Main Directorate (military counterintelligence) of the USSR Ministry of State Security. Since September 1952 Ivashutin became Minister of State Security of the Ukrainian SSR. From March 1953 he was Deputy Minister of Internal Affairs of the Ukrainian SSR. Since July 1953 he was Deputy Head of the 3rd Directorate (military counterintelligence) of the USSR Ministry of Internal Affairs. In 1954 he became head of the counterintelligence department in the industry of the Ministry of Internal Affairs.

Immediately after the creation of the KGB of the USSR, he was transferred there and in March 1954 he was appointed head of the 5th department (economic counterintelligence) of the KGB under the Council of Ministers of the USSR.

From June 1954 he was appointed Deputy Chairman of the KGB and from January 1956 the First Deputy Chairman of the KGB under the Council of Ministers of the USSR. During 5 to 13 November 1961 he became the temporary acting Chairman of the KGB at the Council of Ministers of the USSR.

From 1950 to 1954 and from 1966 he was a deputy of the Soviet of Nationalities of the Supreme Soviet of the USSR from the North Ossetian Autonomous Soviet Socialist Republic. Over the years he was a deputy of the Supreme Soviet of the RSFSR and the Supreme Soviet of the Ukrainian SSR.

=== Chief of the GRU ===
From 14 March 1963 to 13 July 1987 Ivashutin became Chief of the Main Intelligence Directorate and Deputy Chief of the General Staff of the USSR Armed Forces.

The total length of service of Pyotr Ivanovich Ivashutin in the GRU was over twenty-four years which made him the longest running GRU chief in the USSR.

One of the primary tasks that Ivashutin had to solve was to minimize the damage inflicted on the GRU by defector Oleg Penkovsky.

On Ivashutin's initiative, the GRU in 1963 began to create a system of round-the-clock information reception and its assessment in order to identify signs of an increase in the combat readiness of foreign armed forces. In other words, a system was created to warn the country's top leadership about military threats in real time. This system later became known as the Command Post. This work, begun by Ivashutin in the 1960s, later became the basis for the creation of the National Center for National Defense Management of the Russian Federation.

In 1963, Ivashutin made a trip to Cuba. The result of this trip was the deployment of a technical intelligence center in Lourdes (a suburb of Havana).

At the insistence of Ivashutin, the construction of a new complex of buildings for the needs of the GRU began on the Khoroshevskoye highway in Moscow. After the first reconnaissance satellites appeared in space, on the initiative of Ivashutin, a Space Intelligence Department also was formed in the GRU.

=== Later life ===
From July 1987, Ivashutin worked in the Group of Inspectors General of the USSR Ministry of Defense. In May 1992 he retired.

Pyotr Ivashutin died on 4 June 2002 in Moscow. He is buried at the Troyekurovskoye Cemetery.

== Security and military ranks ==
- Captain of State Security - 4 February 1939;
- Major of State Security - 16 April 1942;
- Colonel - 14 February 1943;
- Major general - 26 May 1943;
- Lieutenant general - 25 September 1944;
- Colonel general - 18 February 1958;
- General of the Army - 23 February 1971.

== Honors and awards ==
- Hero of the Soviet Union (21 February 1985, for the courage shown in the fight against the German fascist invaders during the Great Patriotic War, and for successful activities to strengthen the Armed Forces of the USSR in the postwar period)
- Order "For Merit to the Fatherland", III degree (28 August 1999)
- 3 Orders of Lenin (13 September 1944, 21 February 1978, 21 February 1985)
- Marshal's Star (1 November 1974)
- Order of the October Revolution (21 February 1974)
- 5 Orders of the Red Banner (19 March 1944, 23 May 1952, 21 February 1964, 31 October 1967, 28 April 1980)
- Order of Bohdan Khmelnitsky, 1st class (28 April 1945)
- 2 Orders of Kutuzov, II degree (29 June 1945, 4 November 1981 - based on the results of the West-81 exercises)
- 2 Orders of the Patriotic War, 1st class (26 October 1943, 11 March 1985)
- Order of the Red Banner of Labour (10 July 1959)
- 3 Orders of the Red Star (7 April 1940, 17 April 1943, 6 November 1946)
- The highest departmental awards of the state security agencies of the USSR:
  - Honored Worker of the NKVD (1942)
  - Honorary State Security Officer (1958)
  - Badge "For service in military intelligence" (No. 001, awarded on 11 May 1998)
