= Stanislav Redens =

Soviet NKVD official

- Станислав Реденс
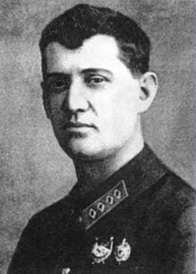
- Redens in 1931

People's Commissar of the Internal Affairs of the Kazakh SSR
- In office 21 November 1938 – 20 January 1938
- Preceded by: Lev Zalin
- Succeeded by: Semyon Burdakov

Chairman of the OGPU under Council of People's Commissars of the Ukrainian SSR
- In office 25 July 1931 – 20 February 1933
- Preceded by: Vsevolod Balitsky
- Succeeded by: Vsevolod Balitsky

Chairman of the OGPU under the Council of People's Commissars of the Byelorussian SSR
- In office 1 May 1931 – 1 June 1931
- Preceded by: Grigory Rappaport
- Succeeded by: German Matson

Personal details
- Born: 12 June 1892 Tykocin, Łomża Governorate, Russian Empire
- Died: 12 February 1940 (aged 47) Moscow, Russian SFSR, Soviet Union
- Party: All-Union Communist Party (Bolsheviks) (1918–1937)
- Other political affiliations: Russian Social Democratic Labour Party (Bolsheviks) (1914–1918)
- Spouse: Anna Alliluyeva

Military service
- Allegiance: Russian Empire (1914–1915); Russian Soviet Federative Socialist Republic (1918–1922); Soviet Union (1922–1938)
- Branch/service: Imperial Russian Army; Cheka; GPU; OGPU; NKVD
- Years of service: 1914–1915; 1918–1938
- Rank: Commissioner of State Security 1st Rank
- Battles/wars: World War I Russian Civil War
- Awards: Honorary Officer of State Security

Stanislav Frantsevich Redens (Russian: Станисла́в Фра́нцевич Ре́денс, Polish: Stanisław Redens; 17 May 1892 – 12 February 1940) was a Soviet NKVD official, one of those responsible for conducting mass repressions under Joseph Stalin. Redens was executed in 1940 after his arrest at the conclusion of the Great Purge in 1938.

== Early life ==
Born to a Polish worker's family in Tykocin in the Łomża Governorate of the Russian Empire, Redens received a limited education and began working in metallurgy in 1907. A Bolshevik since 1914, he was briefly mobilized into the army during World War I but was soon demobilized and returned to political activity in time for the 1917 Russian Revolution.

== Career ==
Redens began to work for the newly established Cheka in 1918, amid the Russian Civil War. He was energetically involved in dekulakization in Ukraine, serving as the head of the Odessa Cheka. Redens held important positions in the Crimean GPU in 1922–1923.

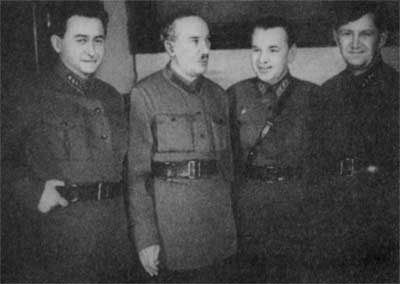
Stanislav Redens in 1934. From left to right: Agranov, Yagoda, unknown, and Redens.

Though made a chief of the Transcaucasian GPU in 1928, Redens was gradually sidelined by his own deputy Lavrenty Beria. In 1931, he was appointed the OGPU head in the Byelorussian SSR and then in the Ukrainian SSR. During his tenure in Ukraine, Redens gained infamy for crackdowns on farmers, which contributed to the Holodomor, the starvation of millions of Ukrainians as part of a larger famine across the Soviet Union. In January 1933, he was recalled to Moscow and placed in charge of the NKVD units in the Moscow Oblast where Redens spearheaded purges following Sergey Kirov assassination in 1934.

Redens was elected to the Supreme Soviet of the Soviet Union in 1937 and appointed as People's Commissar for Internal Affairs of the Kazakh Soviet Socialist Republic in 1938. He was arrested in November 1938 on charges of being a member of "Polish subversive-spying group". He was shot on 12 February 1940. He was rehabilitated under Nikita Khrushchev in 1961.

== Personal life ==
Redens was married to Anna Sergeyevna Alliluyeva (1896–1964), sister of Stalin's second wife Nadezhda Alliluyeva, also an Old Bolshevik and former Cheka officer who spent 6 years in prison under Stalin. Their son, Vladimir Alliluyev (Redens) (born 1935), published, in 1995, his memoirs "Chronicle of a Family" which advocated Russia's return to Stalinism and was condemned by Stalin's daughter Svetlana Alliluyeva.

== See also ==
- Outline of the Russian Revolution and Civil War
- Bibliography of the Russian Revolution and Civil War
- Bibliography of Stalinism and the Soviet Union
- Index of Old Bolsheviks
- Index of articles related to the Russian Revolution and Civil War
