= People's Commissariat of State Security (Ukraine) =

People's Commissariat of State Security of the UkrSSR or NKDB of the UkrSSR (Ukrainian: Народний комісаріат державної безпеки УРСР; НКДБ УРСР) was a union-republican agency of state security that was created for the first time on March 12, 1941, according to ukase of the Presidium of the Verkhovna Rada of the Ukrainian SSR and which verbatim copied ukase of the Presidium of the Supreme Soviet of the Soviet Union of February 3, 1941. Pavlo Meshyk was appointed a narkom.

== Overview ==
On March 21, 1941, Verkhovna Rada implemented required changes and amendments to articles 45 and 48 of Constitution of the Ukrainian SSR. NKDB received status of a union-republican people's commissariat and its structure and tasks were defined with respect to structure and tasks of the NKGB of the USSR. Local affiliations of NKDB of the UkrSSR were regional administrations of NKDB (UNKDB). In districts, where were located big industrial centers of defense or nationwide significance that represented interest to foreign intelligence, were to be created district departments of NKDB. Also there were plans to organize operative departments and posts of NKDB at big rail stations and operative departments of NKDB at sea ports.

With the start of the Great Patriotic War NKVD of the USSR and NKGB of the USSR were merged according to the ukase of the Presidium of the Supreme Soviet of July 20, 1941. Respectfully (in the beginning of August 1941) NKDB of the UkrSSR and NKVS of the UkrSSR were also merged. After liberation of bigger part of territory of the USSR from the Nazi Germany occupation NKGB of the USSR was recreated according to resolution of Politburo of the Central Committee of the Communist Party of the Soviet Union and ukase of Presidium of the Supreme Council of April 14, 1943 and in May 1943 there was recreated NKDB of the UkrSSR. Sergei Savchenko was appointed the narkom of state security of the UkrSSR on the orders of NKGB of the USSR. That appointment was secured by ukase of Presidium of the Verkhovna Rada of October 25, 1943. Structure and tasks of NKDB of the UkrSSR as earlier had to correspond the nationwide standards and structurally functional edification of NKGB of the USSR.

NKDB of the UkrSSR was liquidated simultaneously with NKGB of the USSR after adaption by Presidium of the Supreme Soviet of March 15, 1946 the law "About transformation of the Council of People's Commissars of the USSR into the Council of Ministers of the USSR and council of people's commissars of union and autonomous republics - into council of ministers of union and autonomous republics". According to the law on March 25, 1946 Presidium of the Verkhovna Rada issued ukase "About transformation of the Council of People's Commissars of the Ukrainian SSR into the Council of Ministers of the Ukrainian SSR and people's commissariats of the Ukrainian SSR - into ministers of the Ukrainian SSR". NKDB was transformed into the Ministry of State Security of the UkrSSR (MDB UkrSSR).
