= Terenty Deribas =

Russian revolutionary (1883–1938)

- Терентий Дерибас
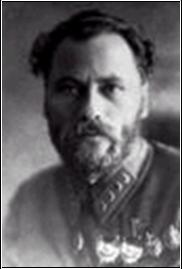

Far Eastern Commander of the NKVD
- In office 10 July 1934 – 31 July 1937
- Succeeded by: Vsevolod Balitsky

Personal details
- Born: Terenty Dmitrievich Deribas; 1883 Uspenskoe, Kherson Governorate, Russian Empire
- Died: July 28, 1938 (aged 55) Kommunarka shooting ground, Moscow, Russian SFSR
- Party: RSDLP (Bolsheviks) (1904–1918); Russian Communist Party (1918–1937)

Terenty Dmitrievich Deribas (Russian: Терентий Дмитриевич Дерибас; 28 March 1883 – 28 July 1938) was a Russian revolutionary, Chekist and later a 1st rank State Security Commissioner in the NKVD.

Deribas was born in the village of Uspenskoe, Kherson Governorate in to a prosperous Cossack family. He joined the Bolshevik Party in 1904.

In November 1918, Deribas joined the Cheka and the Red Army, and was chief of the political department of several divisions. He took part in suppression of counter-revolutionary uprisings, including those of Kronstadt and Tambov.

In 1929, Deribas was transferred as a representative of the OGPU to the Far East, where he led a massive repression. In 1931, he became a member of the board of the NKVD.

During the Great Purge, when the new head of the NKVD Nikolai Yezhov was systematically removing officers associated with his predecessor, Genrikh Yagoda, the Politburo issued an order on 8 May 1937, recalling Deribas to Moscow, and appointing Vsevolod Balitsky as his replacement, but in June Balitsky was dismissed and Deribas was temporarily reinstated, until Genrikh Lyushkov arrived to replace him on 31 July 1937.

Deribas was then under orders to report to Moscow, but delayed his departure, at the same time trying to avoid meeting Lyushkov, who sent a telegram to Yezhov complaining that Deribas's behaviour was "suspicious", and that he had been named as a member of a secret "right Trotskyite" organisation. On 11 August, Yezhov forwarded the telegram to Stalin, who wrote a note saying "Deribas will have to be arrested", which was endorsed by Molotov and Voroshilov. Deribas was arrested the following day, (12 August 1937), and sentenced to death on 28 July 1938, and executed by shooting on the same day, at the firing range Kommunarka.

He was posthumously rehabilitated on 31 December 1957.
