= Timofei Strokach =

Soviet security officer (1903–1963)

- Тимофій Строкач
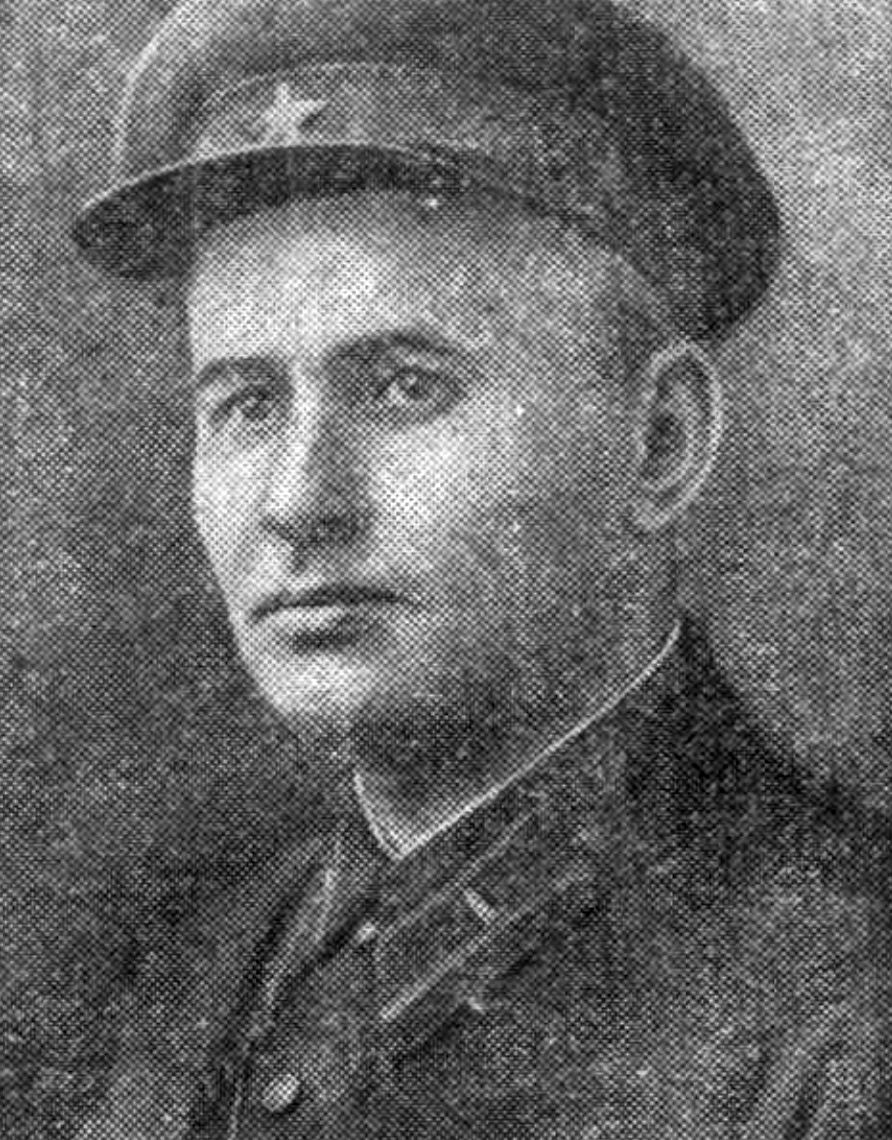

Minister (People's Commissar) of the Interior of the Ukrainian SSR
- In office 16 January 1946 – 16 March 1953
- Preceded by: Vasiliy Ryasnoi
- Succeeded by: Pavlo Meshyk
- In office 3 July 1953 – 31 May 1956
- Preceded by: Pavlo Meshyk
- Succeeded by: Aleksei Brovkin

Commander of the Soviet Border Troops
- In office 28 May 1956 – 8 March 1957
- Preceded by: Pavel Zyryanov
- Succeeded by: Pavel Zyryanov

Commander of the Soviet Interior Troops
- In office 9 June 1956 – 8 March 1957
- Preceded by: Alexander Sirotkin
- Succeeded by: Semyon Donskov

Personal details
- Born: 4 March 1903 Belotserkovitsy, Primorskaya Oblast, Russian Empire
- Died: 15 August 1963 (aged 60) Kiev, Ukrainian SSR, Soviet Union (now Ukraine)
- Resting place: Baikove Cemetery
- Party: Communist Party of the Soviet Union
- Education: OGPU Border College
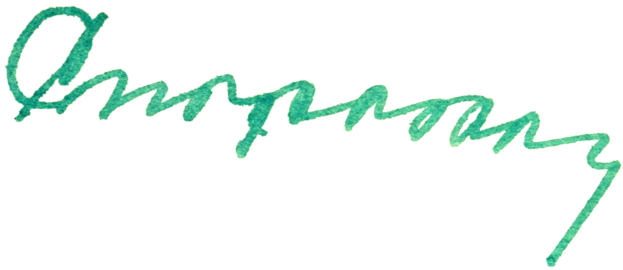
- Signature

Military service
- Allegiance: Soviet Union
- Branch/service: OGPU; NKVD; KGB; Soviet Border Troops; Soviet partisans
- Years of service: 1924–1957
- Rank: Lieutenant general
- Battles/wars: World War II; Bessarabia and Northern Bukovina Occupation

Timofei Amvrosievich Strokach (Russian: Тимофей Амвросиевич Строкач; Ukrainian: Тимофій Амвросійович Строкач, romanized: Tymofiy Amvrosiiovych Strokach; 4 March 1903 – 15 August 1963) was a prominent military figure of the Soviet NKVD and KGB.

== Early life and education ==
Ethnic Ukrainian Strokach was born on 4 March 1903 in village of Belotserkovitsy, Primorskaya Oblast (today Astrakhanka in Primorsky Krai), in a poor peasant family of colonists from Ukraine (near Bila Tserkva). In 1914 he graduated a rural school and worked by helping his father. In January 1924 Strokach was called on compulsory military service.

== Career ==
From the very start in 1924, Strokach was enlisted in the OGPU Troops as a Red Armyman of the 58th Nikolsk-Ussuriysk Border Detachment quartered in Iman (today Dalnerechensk). In 1925–1927 he was a student of the OGPU Border School #2 in Minsk. Here he joined the Communist Party of the Soviet Union in 1927. Following its graduation, Strokach returned to the Russian Far East in the 56th Blagoveshchensk Border Detachment where he served as assistant commander and commander. In 1929–1932 Strokach served in the 53rd Daursk Border Detachment.

In 1932–1933 Strokach was a student of the OGPU Border College. After its graduation, he moved to serve to border guard units in Ukraine. At first Strokach was a team commander of the 20th Slavuta Border Detachment, in 1935–1938 he was on leading roles at the 24th Mohyliv-Podilskyi Border Detachment, with a small break in 1938 when he also became a regimental commander of the 162nd regiment headquartered in Voroshylovhrad.

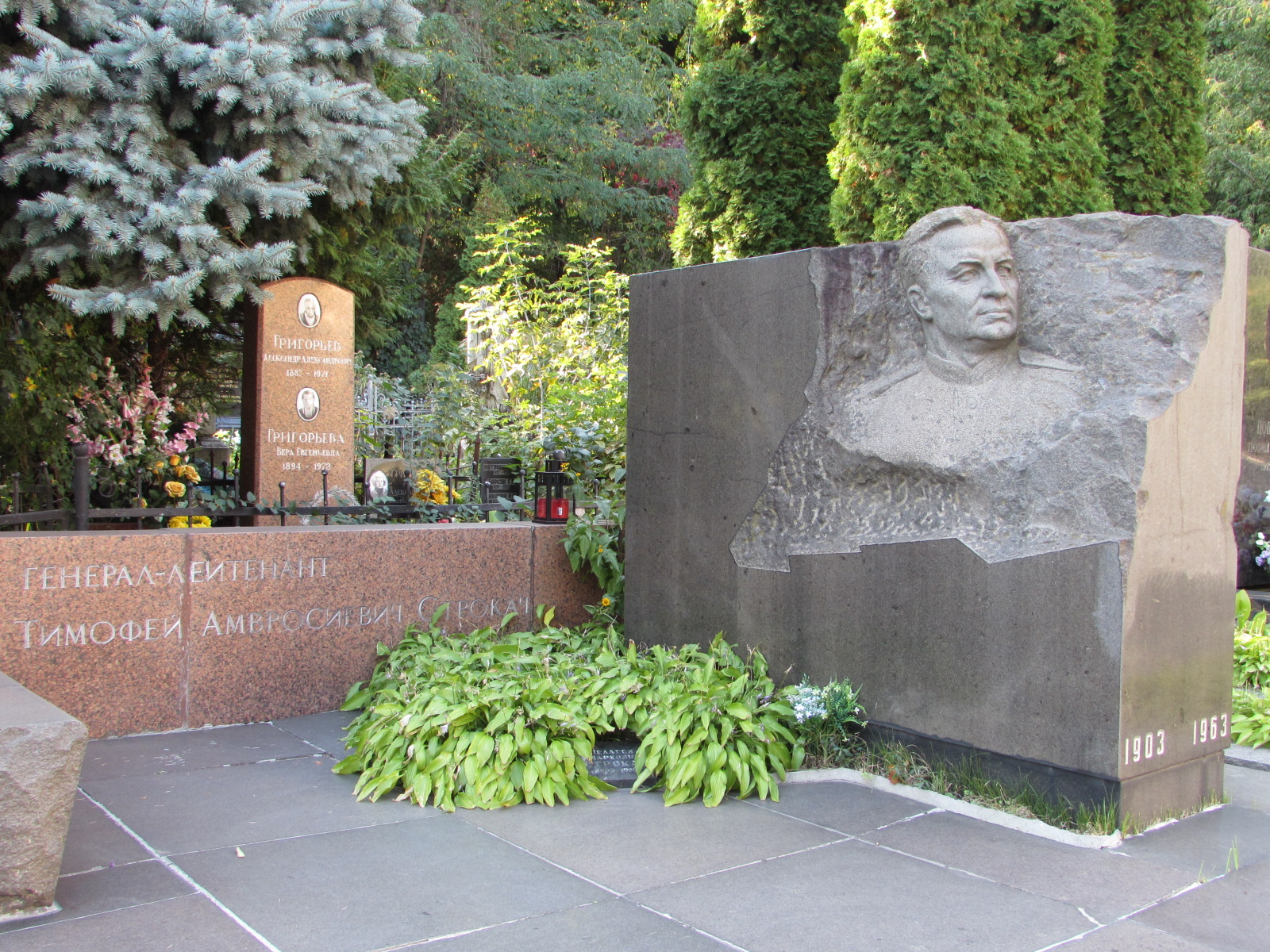
Tomb of Strokach at Baikove Cemetery

Just before the World War II, in 1938 Strokach became a commander of the 25th Border Detachment in Tiraspol. Following the Soviet occupation of Bessarabia and Northern Bukovina, the detachment's headquarters was relocated to Cahul in 1940. In 1941–1946 Strokach was a deputy people's commissar of Interior of UkrSSR. Soon after the German invasion of the Soviet Union, in 1942 he was placed in charge of the Ukrainian Staff Directorate of partisan movement. Same year Strokach became a member of underground central committee of the Communist Party of Ukraine. After liberation of Ukraine, in 1944 he was placed in charge of the Directorate in combating banditry.

In 1946–1956 Strokach was a People's Commissar (Minister) of Interior (NKVD) of the Ukrainian SSR with a small break in 1953 when he headed the regional Interior service in Lviv Oblast, while his position was held by Pavlo Meshyk. In 1956–1957 Strokach was a Deputy Minister of Interior of the Soviet Union. During that period he was a commander of the Soviet Border Troops and Interior Troops.

Due to his health conditions, in 1957 Strokach retired and continued to live in Kyiv. He died there on 15 August 1963, aged 60, and was buried at Baikove Cemetery.

== Awards ==
- Order of Lenin (1943, 1948, 1949)
- Order of the Red Banner (1945, 1954)
- Order of Suvorov (1st degree, 1945)
- Order of the Great Patriotic War (1st degree, 1945)
- Order of the Red Star (1952)
- Honorary badge "Merited NKVD agent" (1942)
