= Vsevolod Balitsky =

Soviet state security official

- Всеволод Балицкий
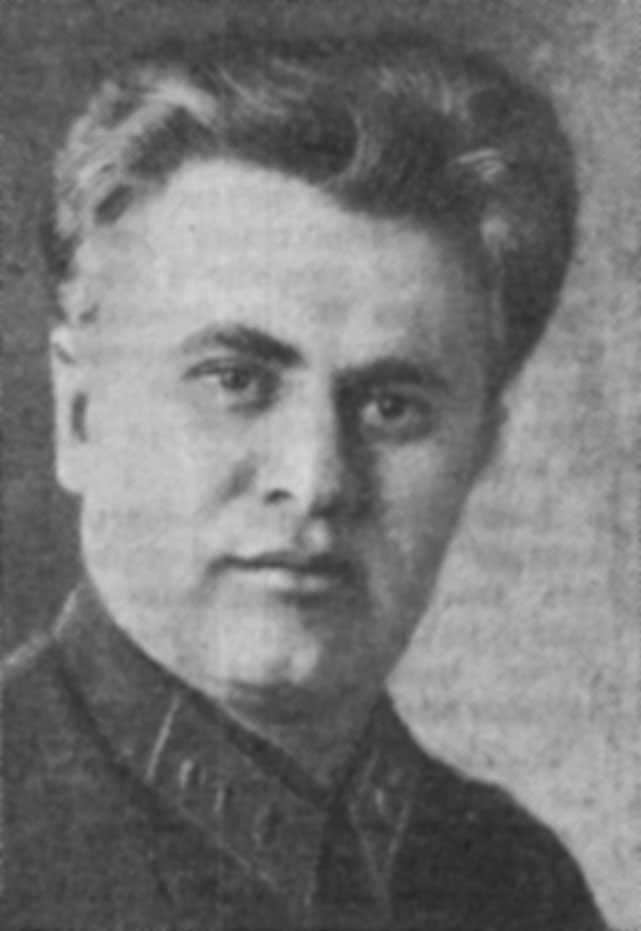

Far Eastern Commander of the NKVD
- In office April 1937 – July 1937
- Preceded by: Terenty Deribas
- Succeeded by: Genrikh Lyushkov

People's Commissar for Internal Affairs of Ukraine (NKVS)
- In office 15 July 1934 – 11 May 1937
- Preceded by: Office established
- Succeeded by: Izrail Leplevsky
- In office March 1924 – December 28, 1930
- Preceded by: Sergey Buzdalin
- Succeeded by: Office abolished

Chairman of the OGPU under Council of People's Commissars of the Ukrainian SSR
- In office 20 February 1933 – 15 July 1934
- Preceded by: Stanislav Redens
- Succeeded by: Office abolished
- In office 1 September 1923 – 25 July 1931
- Preceded by: Vasiliy Mantsev
- Succeeded by: Stanislav Redens

Personal details
- Born: Vsevolod Apollonovich Balitsky; December 9 [O.S. November 27] 1892 Verkhnodniprovsk, Yekaterinoslav Governorate, Russian Empire
- Died: November 27, 1937 (aged 44) Moscow, Russian SFSR, Soviet Union
- Party: All-Union Communist Party (Bolsheviks) (1918–1937)
- Other political affiliations: Russian Social Democratic Labour Party (Bolsheviks) (1915–1918)

Military service
- Allegiance: Russian Empire (1913–1917); Russian Soviet Federative Socialist Republic (1918–1922); Soviet Union (1922–1937)
- Branch/service: Imperial Russian Army; Cheka; GPU; OGPU; NKVD
- Years of service: 1913–1917; 1918–1937
- Rank: Commissioner of State Security 1st Rank
- Battles/wars: Russian Civil War

Vsevolod Apollonovich Balitsky (Russian: Всеволод Аполлонович Балицкий, Ukrainian: Всеволод Аполлонович Балицький; December 9 [O.S. November 27] 1892 – November 27, 1937) was a Soviet official, Commissar of State Security 1st Class (equivalent to Four-star General) of the NKVD and a member of the Central Committee of the All-Union Communist Party (Bolsheviks).

== Early career ==
Balitsky was a Russian-speaking ethnic Ukrainian, born in Verkhnodniprovsk, Yekaterinoslav Governorate and raised in Luhansk, where his father worked in a factory as an accountant. He joined the Russian Social Democratic Labour Party as a student at law school in Moscow. Initially a Menshevik, 1913–15, he joined the Bolshevik Party in 1915, and joined Cheka in 1918. During the Russian Civil War, he was in Ukraine, where he took part in the mass killing of hostages. In 1926, he was Ukraine People's Commissar for Internal Affairs. In 1928–30, he was in charge of putting down revolts by Ukrainian peasants who objected to being forced to give up their land and join collective farms, telling his subordinates: "If the order if given to shoot into the crowd and you refuse then I will shoot all of you. You must conform without objections to my commands. I will permit no protests."

In 1931, Balitsky was transferred to Moscow, as Deputy Chairman of the OGPU, third in seniority behind Vyacheslav Menzhinsky and Genrikh Yagoda. In September 1932, he led the interrogation of Martemyan Ryutin, the author of a manifesto calling for Stalin to be removed from office.

== Role in the Soviet famine ==
In November 1932, on Stalin's orders, Balitsky was appointed OGPU special representative in Ukraine, while retaining his post as deputy chairman, because Stalin believed the Ukraine party leadership was not strong enough to deal with peasant resistance to forced Collectivisation, or to root out agents of the Polish government, who Stalin believed to have an extensive network in Ukraine. In February 1933, he officially replaced Stalin's brother-in-law, Stanislav Redens, as head of OGPU in Ukraine In his first month back in Ukraine, the Ukrainian OGPU arrested 14,230 people. In December, he claimed to have uncovered a network of Polish agents operating in 67 districts.

He directed the Ukrainian OGPU during the Great Famine. The famine was a direct result of forcing rural producers to move onto collective farms, but Balytsky found scapegoats, including veterinarians, of whom 100 were reportedly shot in Vinnytsia province alone, in 1933–37, after a fungus in barley straw killed a large number of horses. He also ordered the arrest of the entire staff of the Meteorological Office, for allegedly damaging the harvest by making inaccurate weather forecasts. In January 1934, he told the 12th Congress of the Ukrainian communist party that he had uncovered a "Bloc of Ukrainian nationalist parties".

== The Great Purge ==
In 1934, it appeared that Balitsky was in line to be the next Soviet chief of police. He and Yagoda were the only serving police officers to be elected full members of the Central Committee of the Communist Party of the Soviet Union at the 17th party congress in February 1934. When the OGPU was merged with the People's Commissariat for the Interior NKVD, in 1934, he was appointed the head of the Ukraine NKVD. When The Kyiv Dynamo Stadium, opened in 1934, it was named the Balitsky Stadium.

But when Yagoda was dismissed and replaced by Nikolai Yezhov, in 1936, any officer who had held high office in the previous administration was likely to come under suspicion. In 1937, Yezhov embarked on a mass ethnic cleansing of Poles in the Soviet Union, and accused Balitsky of not being vigilant enough against the supposed threat of a Polish Military Organization – despite the fact that the previous April, under Balitsky's supervision, about 35,700 Poles living alongside the Ukrainian frontier had been deported to Kazakhstan.

On 8 May 1937, Balytsky was appointed head of the NKVD in the Far East, in place of Terenty Deribas. Once he had left Ukraine, an NKVD brigade headed by Mikhail Frinovsky and Izrail Leplevsky arrived in Kyiv to "expose and destroy the espionage, sabotage, diversion and conspiratory Trotskyists and other counter-revolutionary groups" in the Ukrainian NKVD and Red Army. In July, Genrikh Lyushkov, who had served under Balitsky in Ukraine, was sent as his replacement in the Far East. Balitsky went to greet him at Khabarovsk station, on 7 July 1937, and was immediately arrested.

On 14 July, Balitsky signed a self-incriminating statement, addressed to Stalin, admitting that he was "objectively guilty of unwittingly contributing to the anti-Soviet activities of enemies of the people", possibly hoping that this would save his life. A week later, on 21 July, he signed another statement, also addressed to Stalin, in which he "confessed" that he had been involved in a "Trotskyist-fascist military conspiracy" with the former commander of the Ukrainian military district, Iona Yakir and others, including several of his own former subordinates, who together supposedly planned to bring about the defeat of the USSR in a war with Germany, Japan and Poland.

On 31 July 1937, the Kyiv Dynamo Stadium was renamed in honour of Nikolai Yezhov, by order of the Politburo.

On 27 November 1937 – his 45th birthday – Balitsky was sentenced to death and shot the same day in Moscow, then buried at Kommunarka.
