= Pavlo Meshyk =

Ukrainian Soviet NKVD officer (1910–1953)

- Павло Мешик

Minister of Interior of UkrSSR
- In office 16 March 1953 – 3 July 1953
- Preceded by: Timofei Strokach; Pyotr Ivashutin (as Ukrainian MGB head)
- Succeeded by: Timofei Strokach

People's Commissar of State Security of UkrSSR
- In office 26 February 1941 – 31 July 1941
- Preceded by: Office established
- Succeeded by: Office abolished

Personal details
- Born: 1910 Konotop, Konotopsky Uyezd, Chernigov Governorate, Russian Empire
- Died: 23 December 1953 (aged 42–43) Moscow, Russian SFSR
- Cause of death: Execution by shooting
- Party: Communist Party of the Soviet Union

Military service
- Allegiance: Soviet Union
- Branch/service: OPGU; NKVD; MGB; MVD
- Years of service: 1932–1953
- Rank: Lieutenant general
- Battles/wars: World War II; Eastern Front

Pavlo Yakovych Meshyk (Ukrainian: Павло Якович Мешик; Russian: Павел Яковлевич Мешик, Pavel Meshyk; 1910 – 23 December 1953) was a Ukrainian Soviet security operative and NKVD officer.

== Biography ==
Meshyk was born in a family of clerks in Konotop. After graduating from Konotop school, in 1925–1930 he worked as a repairman at Konotop Mechanical Factory. At the factory, Meshyk graduated the school of FZU and in 1930 in Kamianets-Podilskyi he finished university preparatory courses. In October 1931 Meshyk with a "Komsomol voyage ticket" enrolled into the Electrical Power Institute in Samara, but already in March 1932 on the party's selection he was directed to work at OGPU.

After finishing the OGPU College (1932–1933), Meshyk worked in the central office of OGPU–NKVD in Moscow in economic and counterintelligence departments (assistant commissioner of Division 1 of the GUGB (OGPU) Economic Department (EKO), 1933–1935; operational commissioner of Division 2 of the GUGB EKO, later Division 14 (Vneshtorg, trade offices) of the GUGB Department 3 (counterintelligence), 1935–1937).

this is the List of leadership positions Meshyk held afterwards:

- 1937–1938 assistant chief of Division 14 of the GUGB Department 3
- 1939 assistant chief of the NKVD Investigational Section
- 1939–1940 chief of the NKVD Main Economic Directorate (GEU) Investigational Section
- 1940–1941 chief of the NKVD GEU Department 1
- 1941 People's Commissar of State Security of the UkrSSR
- 1941–1943 chief of the NKVD Economic Directorate (EKU)
  - 1941 chief of the NKVD Special Department 7 (production of weaponry)
  - 1942 chief of the NKVD EKU Department 1 (aviation)
- 1943–1945 assistant chief of the NKO Main Directorate of Counterintelligence (GUKR) SMERSH
- 1945 NKVD commissioner of the First Ukrainian Front
- 1945 advisor to Ministry of General Administration at the Provisional Government of the Republic of Poland (including the Provisional Government of National Unity)

Upon his return from Poland, Meshyk worked for the Soviet atomic bomb project:

- 1945–1953 assistant chief of the First Main Directorate (Sovnarkom – Sovmin of USSR)
- 1953 Minister of Internal Affairs of the UkrSSR (on initiative of Lavrentiy Beria)

On 30 June 1953 Meshyk was arrested in Kiev. On 23 December 1953 he was sentenced by the Special court presence (Russian: Специальное судебное присутствие, Spetsialnoye sudebnoye prisutstvie) of the Supreme Court of USSR to "VMN" (i.e. capital punishment) on the "case of Beria's gang". Meshyk was executed by shooting. He was stripped of all awards and titles. Meshyk was partially rehabilitated when on 29 May 2000 the Military Collegium of the Supreme Court of the Russian Federation requalified corpus delicti (body of the crime) to "Excess of power and abuse of office that led to severe consequences", execution by shooting changed to 25 years of imprisonment without confiscation of personal property.

== Awards ==
- Order of Lenin (1949)
- 2 Order of the Red Banner (1943, 1944)
- 2 Order of Kutuzov (1st degree, 1945)
- Order of the Red Banner of Labour (1942)
- Order of the Red Star (1940)
- Order of the Badge of Honour (1937)
- Merited NKVD agent (1941)
