= Izrail Leplevsky =

Soviet security officer (1894–1938)

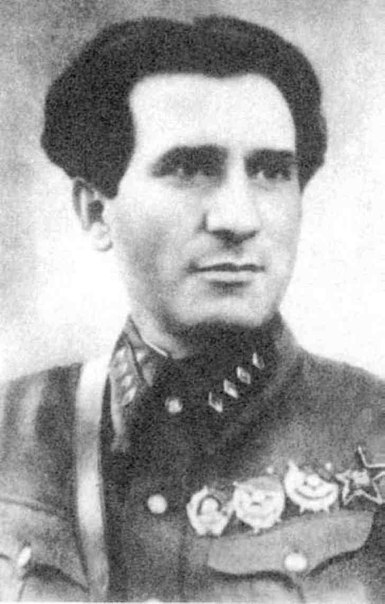
- Izrail Lepelevsky

People's Commissar of Internal Affairs of the Ukrainian SSR
- In office 14 June 1937 – 25 January 1938
- Preceded by: Vasiliy Ivanov
- Succeeded by: Alexander Uspensky

People's Commissar of International Affairs of the Byelorussian SSR
- In office 10 December 1934 – 28 November 1936
- Preceded by: Leonid Zakovsky
- Succeeded by: Georgy Molchanov

Personal details
- Born: 1894 Brest-Litovsk, Grodno Governorate, Russian Empire
- Died: July 28, 1938 (aged 43–44) Moscow, Soviet Union
- Cause of death: Execution
- Party: All-Union Communist Party (Bolsheviks) (1917–1938)
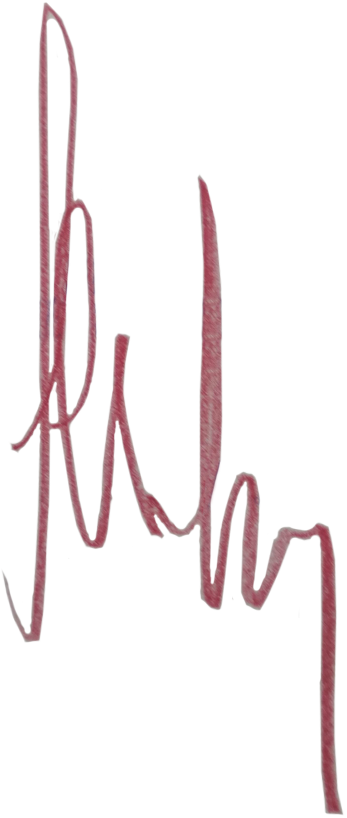
- Signature

Military service
- Allegiance: Russian Empire (1914–1917); Russian Soviet Federative Socialist Republic (1918–1922); Soviet Union (1922–1938)
- Branch/service: Imperial Russian Army; Cheka; GPU; OGPU; NKVD
- Rank: Commissioner of State Security 2nd Rank
- Battles/wars: World War I Russian Civil War

Izrail Moiseyevich Leplevsky (Russian: Израиль Моисеевич Леплевский; 1894 – July 28, 1938) was a Soviet security officer. He was part of the Intelligence Service and Secret police apparatus in the Ukrainian Soviet Socialist Republic, then People's Commissar of Internal Affairs of the Ukrainian SSR from June 14, 1937 to January 25, 1938. His brother Gregory Leplevsky also worked in senior positions in the Soviet Union, including as Prosecutor of the USSR.

== Early years ==
Born into a Jewish family in Brest-Litovsk, Grodno Governorate, Leplevsky received a home education and worked afterwards in a hat shop, and in a pharmacy warehouse. In 1914 he was enrolled as a conscript in the Russian army and served on the Turkish front from October 1914 till June 1917.

== Political career ==
In March 1917, Leplevsky became active in the Bolshevik party in Tbilisi. From June 1917 he was a member of the military organization of the RSDLP (Bolshevik) in Yekaterinoslav. Afterwards, he made a career in the Soviet secret service, the GPU, in the Ukrainian Soviet Socialist Republic, culminating in his appointment as People's Commissar of Internal Affairs of the Ukrainian SSR from June 14, 1937 to January 25, 1938. During this period he was in charge of mass repressions in Ukraine. In particular, he was the major instigator of Vesna Case, a massive repression of former officers and generals of the Russian Imperial Army during 1930–1931.

He was arrested on April 26, 1938, and on 28 July he was shot according to a sentence passed by the Military Collegium of the Supreme Court of the USSR.

Political offices
Preceded by Leonid Zakovsky	People's Commissar of Internal Affairs of Belarus; 1934–1936	Succeeded by Georgy Molchanov
Preceded by Vasiliy Ivanov	People's Commissar of Internal Affairs of Ukraine; 1937–1938	Succeeded by Aleksandr Uspensky
