= Militsiya (Ukraine) =

Law enforcement of Ukraine from 1917 to 2015

Militsiya Міліція
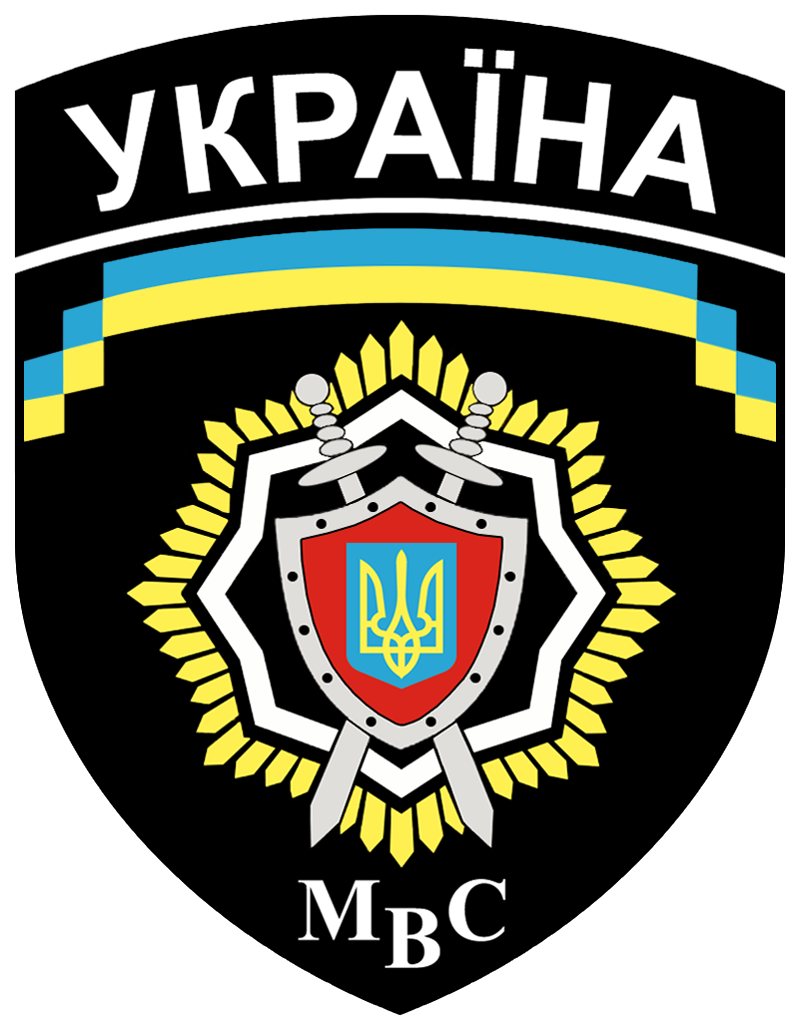
- Patch

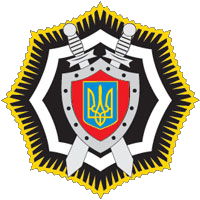
- Emblem

Agency overview
- Formed: March 1917
- Preceding agency: Police of the Russian Empire
- Dissolved: 7 November 2015; 11 years ago
- Superseding agency: National Police of Ukraine
- Employees: 152,000 (1 October 2015)

Jurisdictional structure
- National agency: Ukraine
- Operations jurisdiction: Ukraine
- Area: 603,500 km²
- Population: 44 million (approx.)
- Governing body: Government of Ukraine
- General nature: Civilian police

Operational structure
- Headquarters: Kyiv, Ukraine
- Parent agency: Ministry of Internal Affairs

The Militsiya (Ukrainian: міліція, pronounced [miˈl⁽ʲ⁾its⁽ʲ⁾ijɐ]) was a type of domestic law enforcement agency (militsiya) that existed in various forms in Ukraine from 1917 until 2015. The Militsiya was originally formed in March 1917, following the February Revolution, and was later put under control of the Ukrainian Soviet Socialist Republic, part of the Soviet Union. Militsiya continued to serve as the national police service in post-Soviet Ukraine until it was replaced by the National Police of Ukraine on 7 November 2015. (Note: On 3 July 2015 the National Police of Ukraine had started to replace militsiya.)

The Militsiya was under the direct control of the Ministry of Internal Affairs (known by the Ukrainian acronym MVS and by the Russian acronym MVD), and it was widely seen as corrupt and inconsiderable to the demands of the Ukrainian public. During Euromaidan, the Militsiya was accused of brutality against protestors as well as kidnapping Automaidan activists, leading to the reputation of the Militsiya being irreversibly damaged. This resulted in its replacement under the post-Maidan Poroshenko presidency.

== History ==
=== Formation ===
Militsiya emerged in lands of the former Russian Empire after the abolition of the police in the aftermath of the February Revolution in March 1917. Unlike the police, which had been subject to the Ministry of Internal Affairs of the Russian Empire, Militsiya squads were subordinated to local authorities. Militsiya continued to exist in this form during the first months of the Ukrainian People's Republic (UPR), but in March 1918 was subordinated to the Ministry of Internal Affairs. Under the Hetmanate Militsiya was renamed into State Guard (Державна Варта). Following UPR's restoration, it restored its original name, but in 1920 was once again renamed and became known as Citizen Watch.

=== In Soviet Ukraine ===
The contemporary Ministry of Internal Affairs of Ukraine originates from the Soviet NKVD's branch in Ukrainian SSR - the "NKVD of the UkrSSR", which was later reformed into the "Ministry of Internal Affairs of UkrSSR" (Ministerstvo vnutrishnikh sprav Ukrayins'koyi SSR). Both agencies were merely a regional branch of the all-Soviet Ministry of Internal Affairs, and essentially a militsiya force since the late 1950s.

Until 1930, Militsiya in Soviet Ukraine was subordinated to the republican Commissariat of Internal Affairs, but after that was directly subjected to the Council of People's Commissars of Ukraine. After the establishment of NKVD in 1934, Ukrainian Militsiya was subordinated to both the republican and all-Union governments. In February 1960 it was once again subordinated to the Ministry of Internal Affairs of Ukrainian SSR. In 1962 Militsiya was officially renamed into Departments for Protection of Public Order, with the Interior Ministry becoming known as Ministry for Protection of Public Order.

The system of Militsiya in Soviet Ukraine was based on the principle of "democratic centralism", with local departments acting as part of directorates of internal affairs in respective regions, cities and districts, where departments of a lower level are subordinated to higher ones. The organization and activities of Militsiya were defined by the government regulation adopted by the Council of People's Commissars of the Soviet Union on 25 May 1931.

Despite some operational autonomy, all regulations and standards of policing were established by the central Ministry; Moscow was directly co-ordinating important operations in Ukraine (such as anti-corruption investigations regarding statesmen of higher levels or other politics-related issues), including deployment of detective brigades from central offices in case of need. The Militsiya of the Ukrainian SSR used the same ranks, insignia and vehicle liveries as the rest of the Soviet militsiya.

Like all the Soviet Ministries of Internal Affairs, the Ukrainian SSR MVS included not only the militsiya, but also the republican branch of non-police services, such as:

- Passport and registration offices
- Internal Troops and prison administration (including the Chief Directorate of Camps)
- Fire and rescue service

==== Militsiya and political repression in Soviet Ukraine ====
MVS of the Ukrainian SSR has been directly involved in Soviet political repressions in Ukraine at all stages. Since the splitting of the NKVD and detachment of the secret police to the MGB-KGB, the militsiya became a secondary instrument of repression in the hands of the KGB, fulfilling such tasks as:

- conducting fabricated charges of non-political crimes against Ukrainian dissidents (like Vyacheslav Chornovil)
- tackling occasional mass protests against Soviet rule
- maintaining the propiska regime
- participation in ethnic-related repressions and restrictions
- assisting in the persecution of religion
- direct persecution of homosexuals and various restricted cultural movements (like rockers, punks, bikers, karate students etc.)

=== Militsiya in independent Ukraine ===
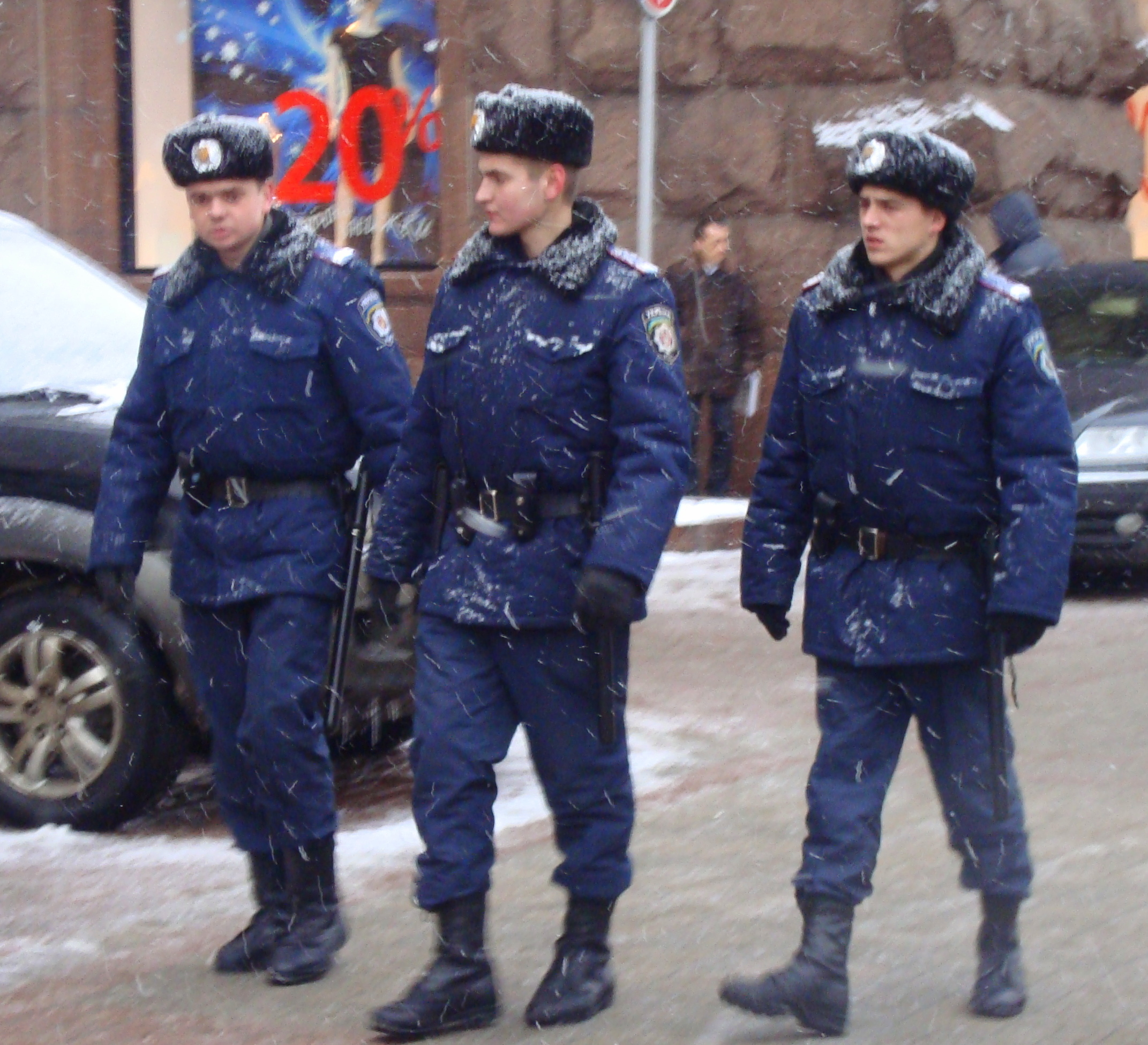
Officers from the Militsiya's public order department patrol Khreshchatyk Street in central Kyiv, c. 2010.

==== Post-Independence reformation and the Gongadze case ====
After independence in 1991, and before the 2004 Constitutional Reform, Ukraine's Minister of Internal Affairs was directly subordinate to the President of Ukraine (appointed by the President unilaterally), also a formal member of Ukraine's Cabinet of Ministers. Before the Orange Revolution, only Generals of the militsiya (not civil statesmen), were appointed Ministers.

During its existence, the Ukrainian militsiya, particularly the post-independence form of the militsiya, had a significant record of law violation and human rights abuse. One of the most notorious cases of human rights abuse, before the agency’s later involvement in Euromaidan in 2013-2014, was the agency's involvement in the murder of journalist Georgiy Gongadze in 2000. Soon after Gongadze's disappearance, recordings of a Major Melnychenko were revealed.

A fragment of the recorded conversations portrayed MVS Minister Kravchenko promising President Kuchma to "take care" of the oppositional journalist. According to the recordings, Kravchenko told Kuchma that he controls a special group of high-class detectives "without any morals, and ready to do anything".

The decapitated and disfigured body of Gongadze was found later in a forest, and a long-lasting investigation started. In 2005, soon after the Orange Revolution, the first results of the case appeared. Three members of the MVS detective squad were charged with the abduction and murder of Gongadze. An international warrant was issued for their chief, General Oleksiy Pukach, who was supposedly hiding abroad.

In March 2005, ex-Minister Kravchenko, the main participant of the case, was found shot in the head (supposedly by his own hand). Later, in September 2010, Ukraine's Office of the Prosecutor General issued a statement stating that prosecutors had concluded that Kravchenko had ordered Pukach to carry out the murder, and stating that Pukach had confessed to the murder.

In the Melnychenko recordings, the hitmen group was called "orly” (Ukrainian: орли, literally "eagles", Russian: орлы) by the Minister. (Note: Orly here it is not a proper name, but a traditional Russian and Ukrainian common name for brave and skilful soldiers). Since then, the phrase "Orly of Kravchenko", became a symbol of lawlessness and brutality in Ukrainian law enforcement.

==== MVS and the UBK campaign ====
In 2000-2001, the MVS was trying to tackle the Ukraine without Kuchma (Ukrainian and Russian abbreviation: UBK) mass protest campaign against President Leonid Kuchma, using various methods: from direct attacks to the infiltration of provocateurs. The final confrontation took place on 9 March 2001 on the central streets of Kyiv, including clashes between protesters and anti-riot units, and mass arrests of youngsters in the city.

==== MVS during the Orange Revolution and later years ====
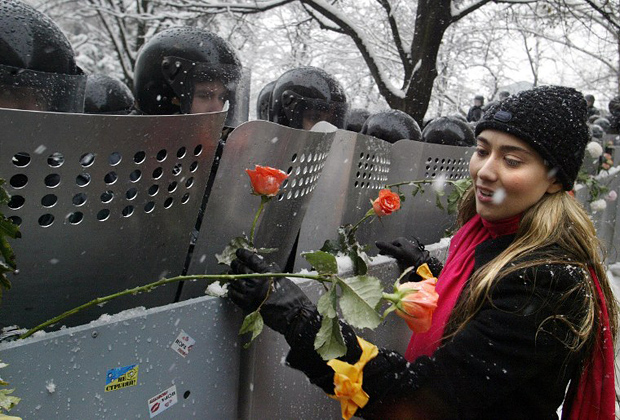
A girl attaches flowers to Kyiv riot militisya officers' shields during the Orange Revolution.

During the 2004 election and the Orange Revolution, the MVS did not confront the opposition protests, although media sources claim that respective orders were given to its anti-riot units by senior commanders and leaders of the country. Minor clashes between protesters and the Berkut happened in the city of Chernihiv, but both sides agreed that they were incidental and provoked by unknown forces. The opposition also accused the militsiya of involvement in attempted electoral fraud that occurred at polling stations.

In February 2005, after the revolution, as part of the post-election democratic changes, President Viktor Yushchenko appointed Yuriy Lutsenko as the new Minister of Internal Affairs. Unlike his predecessors, Lutsenko was a career politician and had never served in the militsiya or any other law enforcement agency. Moreover, as one of the main figures in the Socialist Party of Ukraine, Lutsenko participated in several protest campaigns and conflicts with the militsiya. The new minister demanded resignations from those officers involved in racketeering. Thus, taking a significant step towards the establishment of civil control over the Ukrainian militia.

In January 2006, Minister Lutsenko admitted that the MVS is in possession of the evidence that would allow them to question and charge ex-President Leonid Kuchma in a privatisation wrongdoing case, if only the MVS had the authority for starting such a case autonomously. Later, according to 2004 constitutional amendments that took effect after the 2006 parliamentary elections, the minister is now nominated by the Prime Minister and appointed by the Verkhovna Rada (parliament), without formal influence of the President. Thus Yuriy Lutsenko, the Minister at the time, who was previously appointed under the old procedure, was reappointed, thereby becoming the first-ever MVS Minister to be agreed upon by the parliamentary coalition and appointed by parliament.

On 1 December 2006, Verkhovna Rada dismissed Lutsenko and appointed Vasyl Tsushko of the Socialist Party as the new Minister. Like his predecessor, Tsushko was also a civil politician (and previously a vineyard manager), not connected to the militsiya before his appointment. Additionally, Tsushko was the first-ever MVS Minister not subordinated to the President.

However, in 2007 Lutsenko returned to the post of minister and remained there until the elections which brought Viktor Yanukovich to power in 2010. After Yanukovich's election, Anatolii Mohyliov was appointed to the minister's position; he is a career militia officer and currently holds the rank of Colonel General of the militsiya. Vitaliy Zakharchenko succeeded him in November 2011.

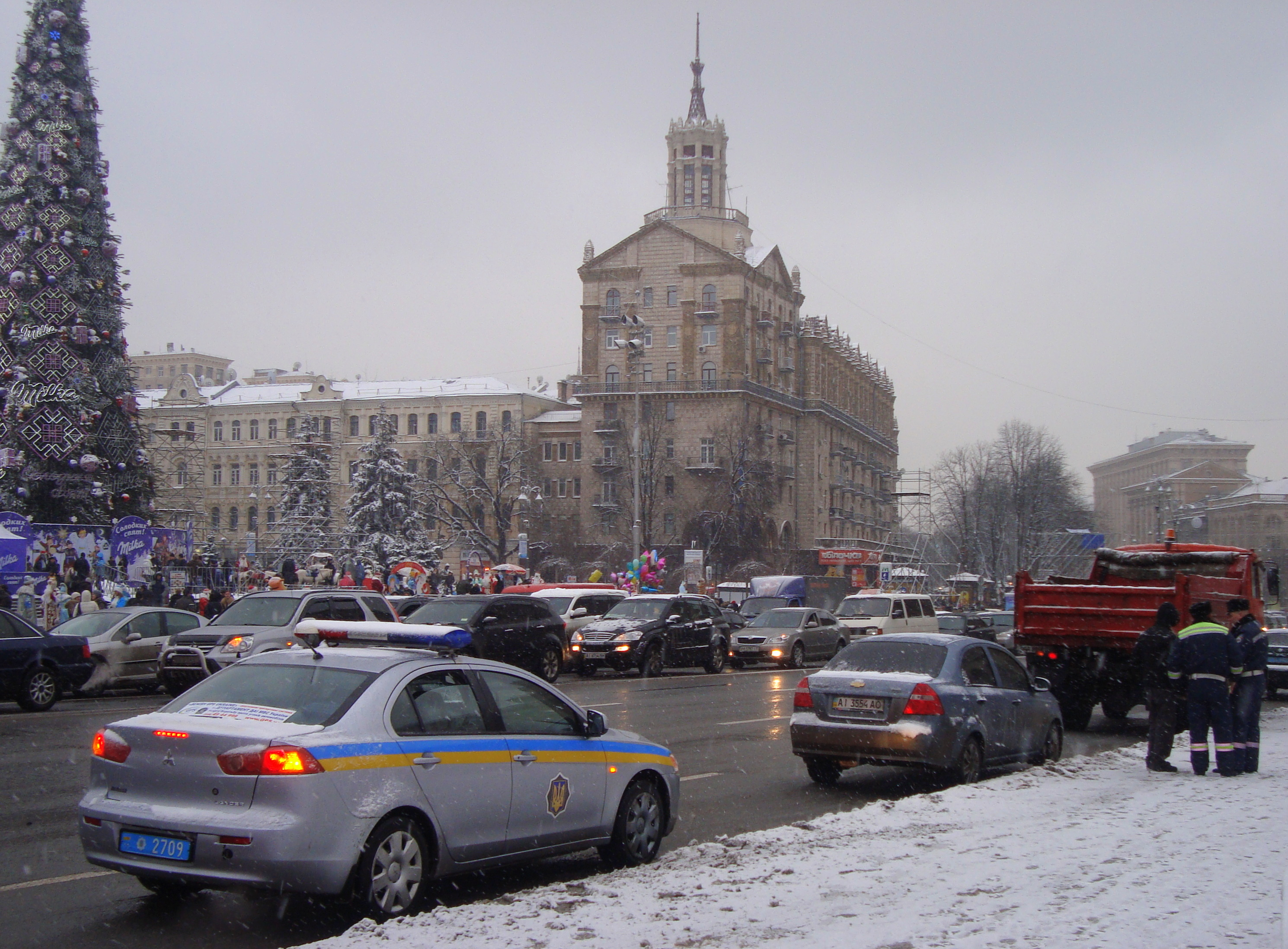
Officers and a patrol car of the DAI, the Militsiya's traffic corps, at work in central Kyiv.

In May 2007, the ongoing political crisis in Ukraine lead to a jurisdiction dispute over the country's Internal Troops. Following minor political clashes involving the militsiya and presidential security forces, President Viktor Yuschenko issued a decree re-subordinating Internal Troops from the Ministry of Internal Affairs directly to the President. The MVS criticised both the decree and the subsequent troop movements.

Both sides in the political crisis managed to avoid further clashes between law enforcers. Now the Internal Troops, as well as all militsiya units, returned to their routine tasks and re-established practical co-ordination. However, the legal dispute over Internal Troops remains unsolved. The Troops command declares its subordination to the President - according to the decree which is currently being appealed in court by the Cabinet of Ministers.

On 10 October 2008 officers from the Security Service of Ukraine detained deputy platoon commander of the Kharkiv city division patrol and inspection service regiment of the Main Interior Affairs Ministry Directorate in Kharkiv region on suspicion of pushing narcotic drugs.

According to head of the trade union of attested employees of law enforcement agencies Anatolii Onyschuk, sociologic research shows that 3.9% of the Ukrainian militiamen trust the state, while 67.7% distrusted the state.

==== 2015 disbandment ====
Following reforms initiated by Ukrainian president Petro Poroshenko in the aftermath of the 2014 Ukrainian revolution, on 3 July 2015 the National Police of Ukraine started to replace militsiya. Officially the National Police replaced the militsiya on 7 November 2015. On that day the remaining militsiya officers were assigned as "temporarily acting" National Police officers. They were eligible for recruitment as National Police officers if they met the age criteria and went through training again and after "integrity" checks.

== Departments ==
The following were the constituent departments of the militsiya:

Leadership (consisting of the minister and his first deputy)
Office of Ministry (Department in monitoring of human rights in activities of OVS)
Advisers to the MVS
Deputy Minister - Chief of HUBOZ

- Chief Department in the fight against the organised crime (HUBOZ)
- Internal Security Service of HUBOZ

Deputy Minister - Chief of Criminal Militsiya (consists of at least nine subordinated departments)
Deputy Minister - Chief of Militsiya of Civil Security

- Department of Civil Security
- Department of the State Auto Inspection (DAI)
- Department of Veterinary Militsiya in conducting quarantine in veterinary events
- Department of State Security Service (formerly part of Militsiya of civil security, it is currently a separate department)
- Department of transportation militsiya

Deputy Minister - Chief of HSU

- Chief Detection Department
- Department of Investigation (Inquiry)
- State Science-Research Expert-Criminal Center

Deputy Minister - Chief of Staff (several independent departments and directorates which are primarily for administrative support)
Deputy Minister

- Department of public relationship and international activity
- State Department on issues of citizenship, immigration, and registration of physical persons

Deputy Minister

- Supporting departments

Deputy Minister - Chief of MVS in Crimea

Service uniform sleeve insignia for uniformed officers
Branch	Criminal	Traffic	Public Order	State Security Service
Insignia				

== Rank hierarchy ==
	Cadet Officers	Private Officers	Non-commissioned Officers
Shoulder insignia for every day uniform
Rank	Cadet of militsiya	Private of militsiya	Junior sergeant of militsiya	Sergeant of militsiya	Senior sergeant of militsiya	Starshina of militsiya	Praporshchik of militsiya	Senior praporshchik of militsiya

	Junior Commissioned Officers				Senior Commissioned Officers			General Officers
Shoulder insignia for every day uniform
Rank	Junior lieutenant of militsiya	Lieutenant of militsiya	Senior lieutenant of militsiya	Captain of militsiya	Major of militsiya	Lieutenant colonel of militsiya	Colonel of militsiya	Major General of militsiya	Lieutenant General of militsiya	Colonel General of militsiya

=== Service medals ===
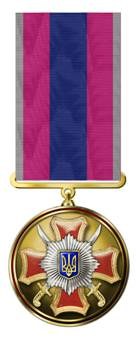
25 years in service

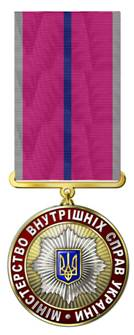
20 years in service

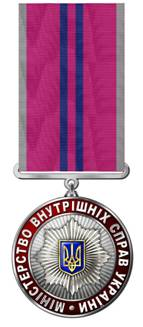
15 years in service

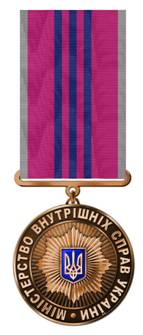
10 years in service

== Transport ==
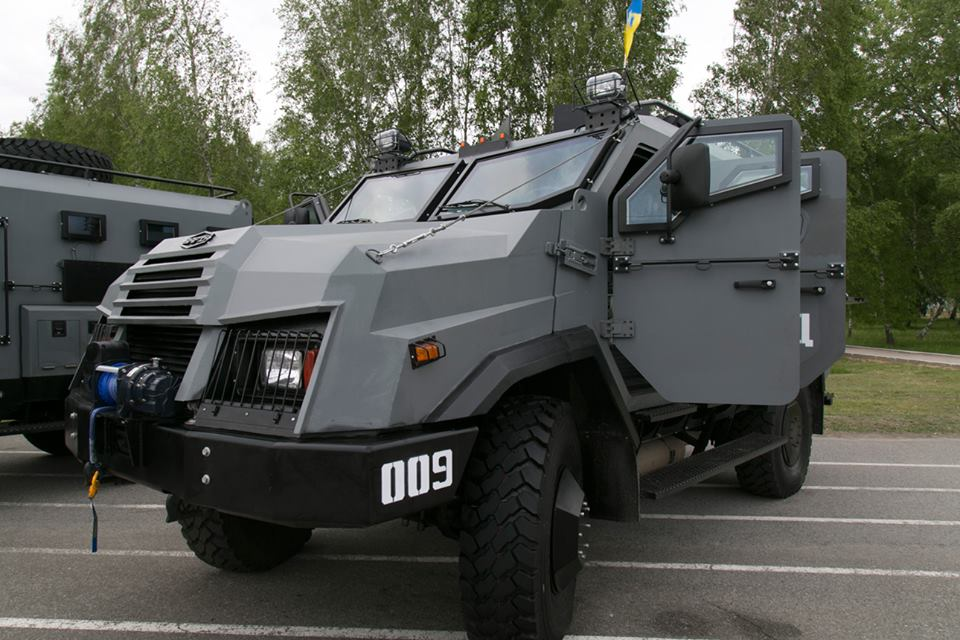
Varta APC

The militsiya used many different forms of transport, which ranged greatly in age and technical specification.

=== Patrol fleet at disbandment ===
==== Patrol cars ====
- GAZ-24 (formerly)
- Honda Accord
- Mitsubishi Galant (formerly)
- Mitsubishi Lancer
- Moskvitch-2141 (formerly)
- Opel Vectra (formerly)
- Skoda Octavia
- Toyota Prius
- Toyota Camry
- Toyota Corolla
- VAZ-2106
- VAZ-2107
- VAZ-2109
- VAZ-2110
- Volkswagen Passat
- ZAZ Tavria
- ZAZ Lanos

==== Vans ====
- GAZ GAZelle
- GAZ Sobol
- Kia Pregio
- Renault Kangoo
- UAZ-452
- Volkswagen Transporter

==== SUVs ====
- Chevrolet Niva
- Lada Niva
- Renault Duster
- SsangYong Actyon
- Toyota Land Cruiser Prado (formerly)
- UAZ Hunter
- UAZ Patriot

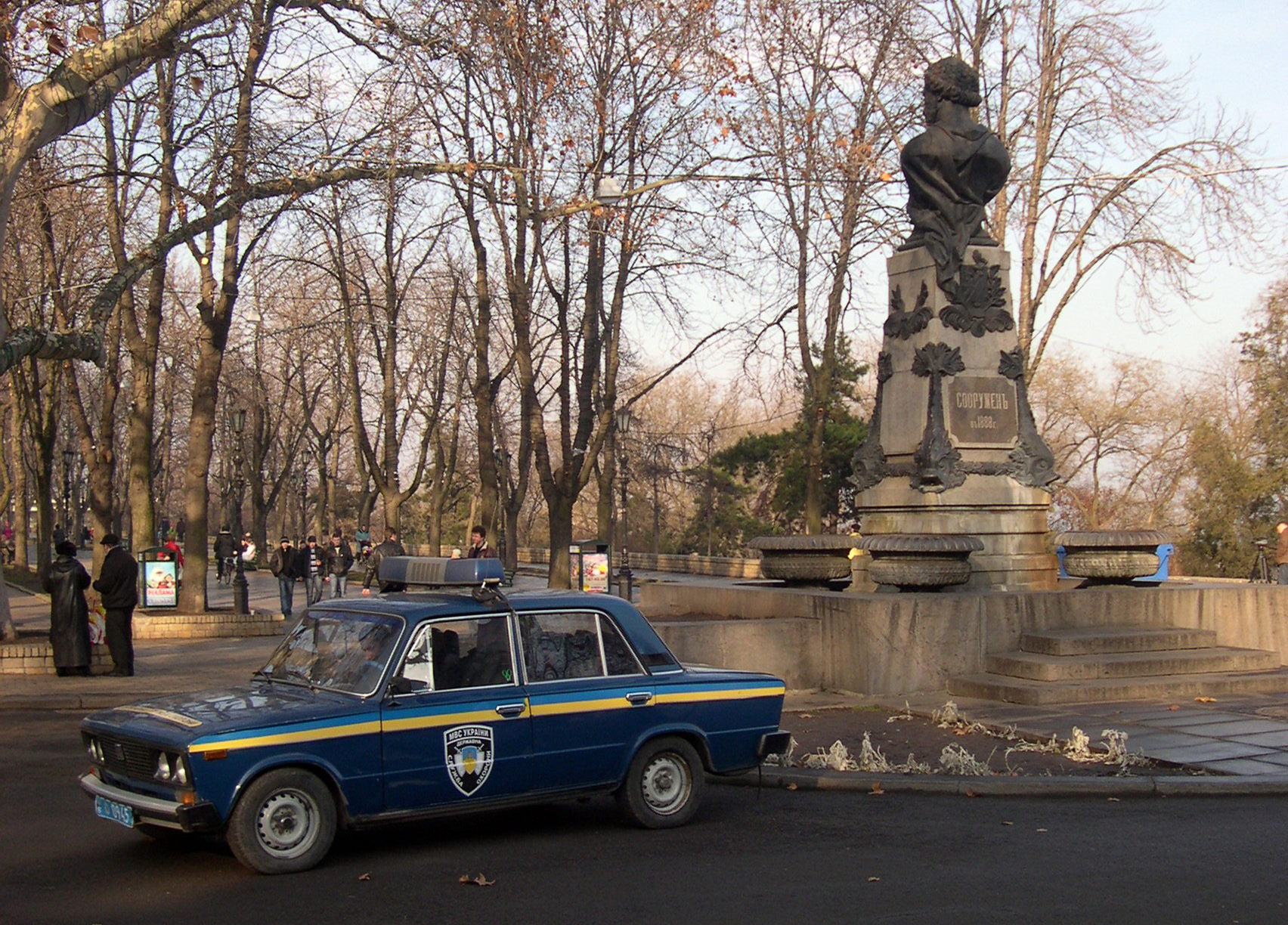
Older VAZ-2106 police car in Odesa

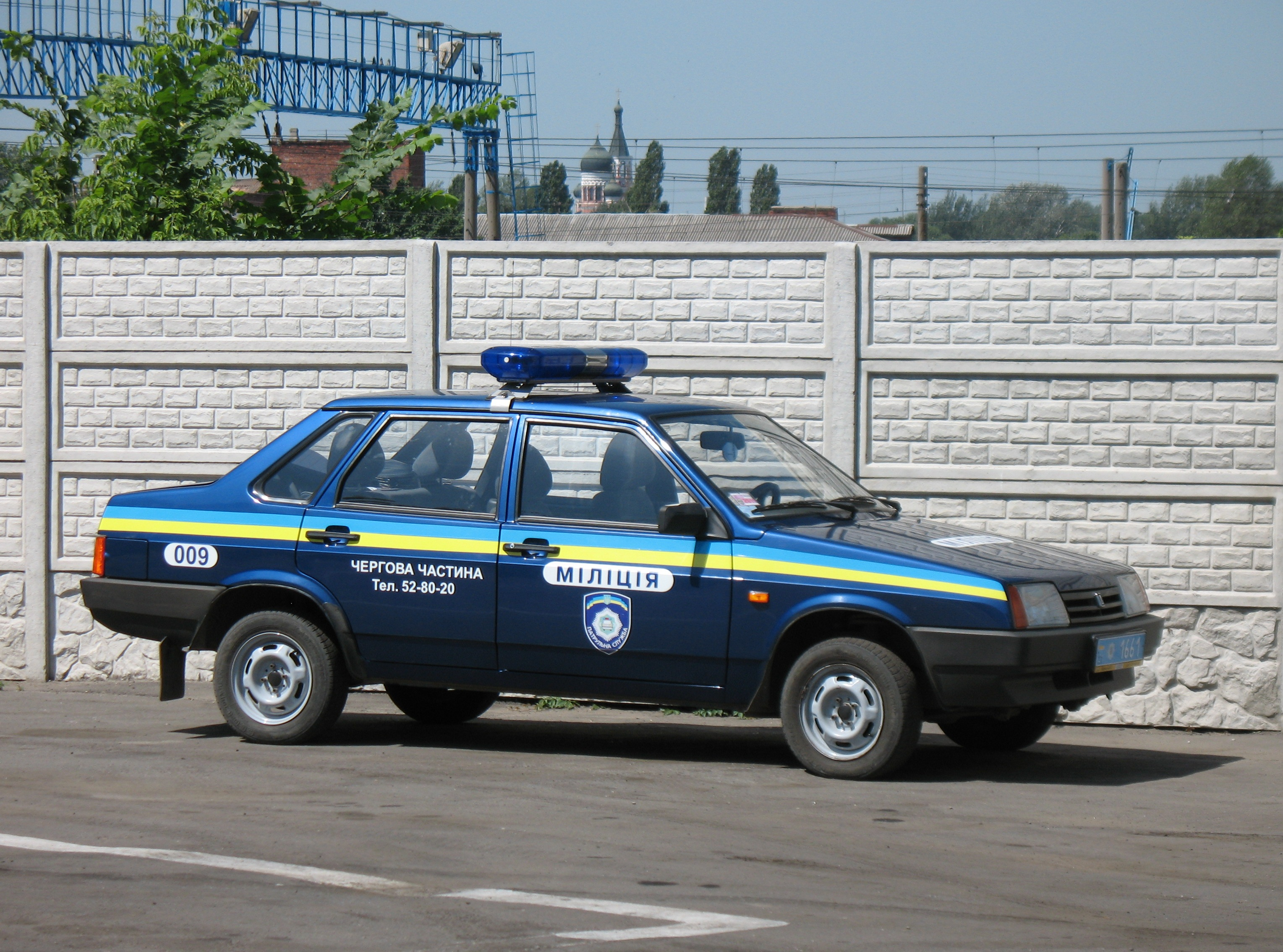
Older VAZ-2109 police car in Kharkiv

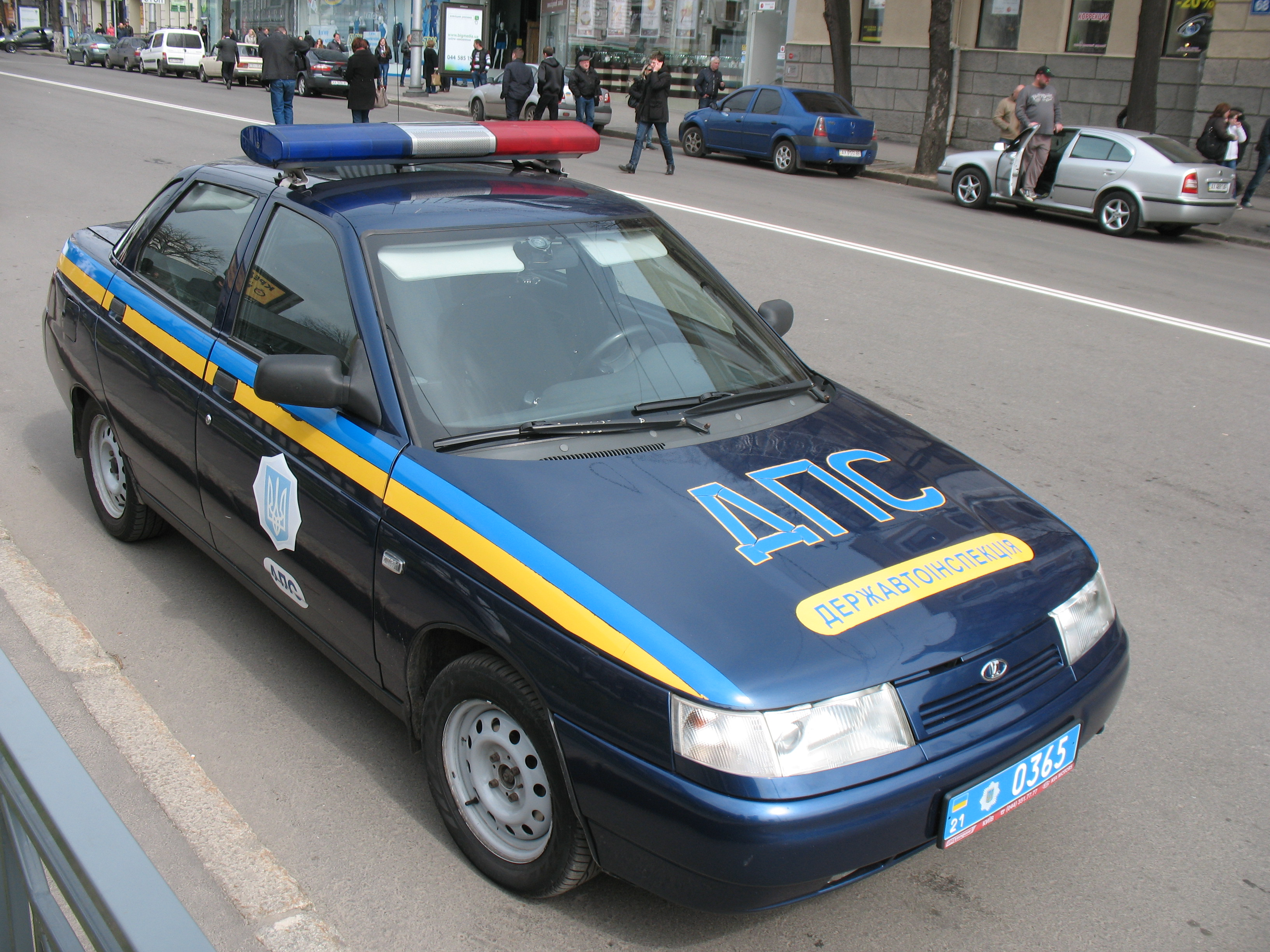
Older VAZ-2110 road police car in Kharkiv

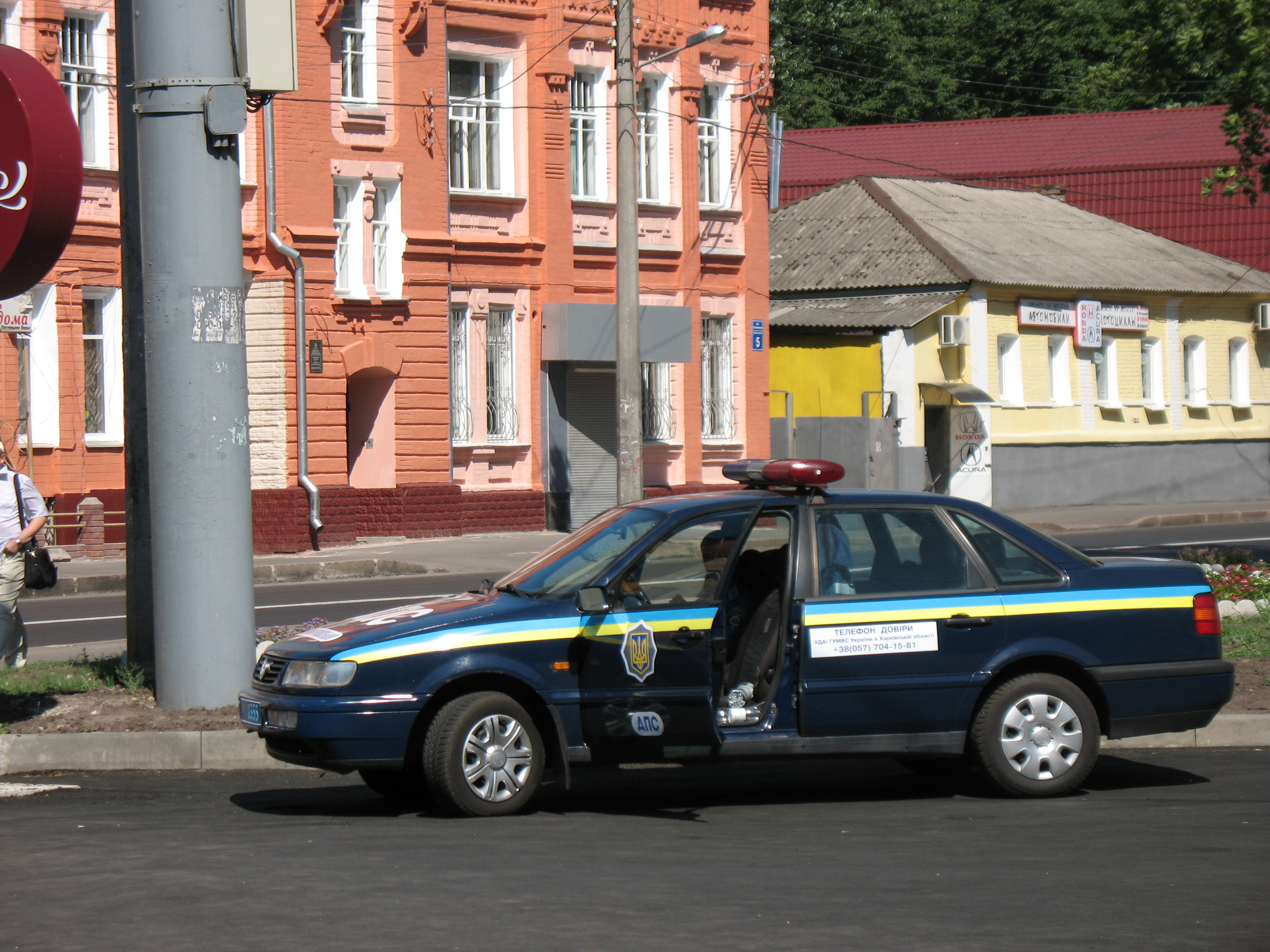
Volkswagen Passat B4

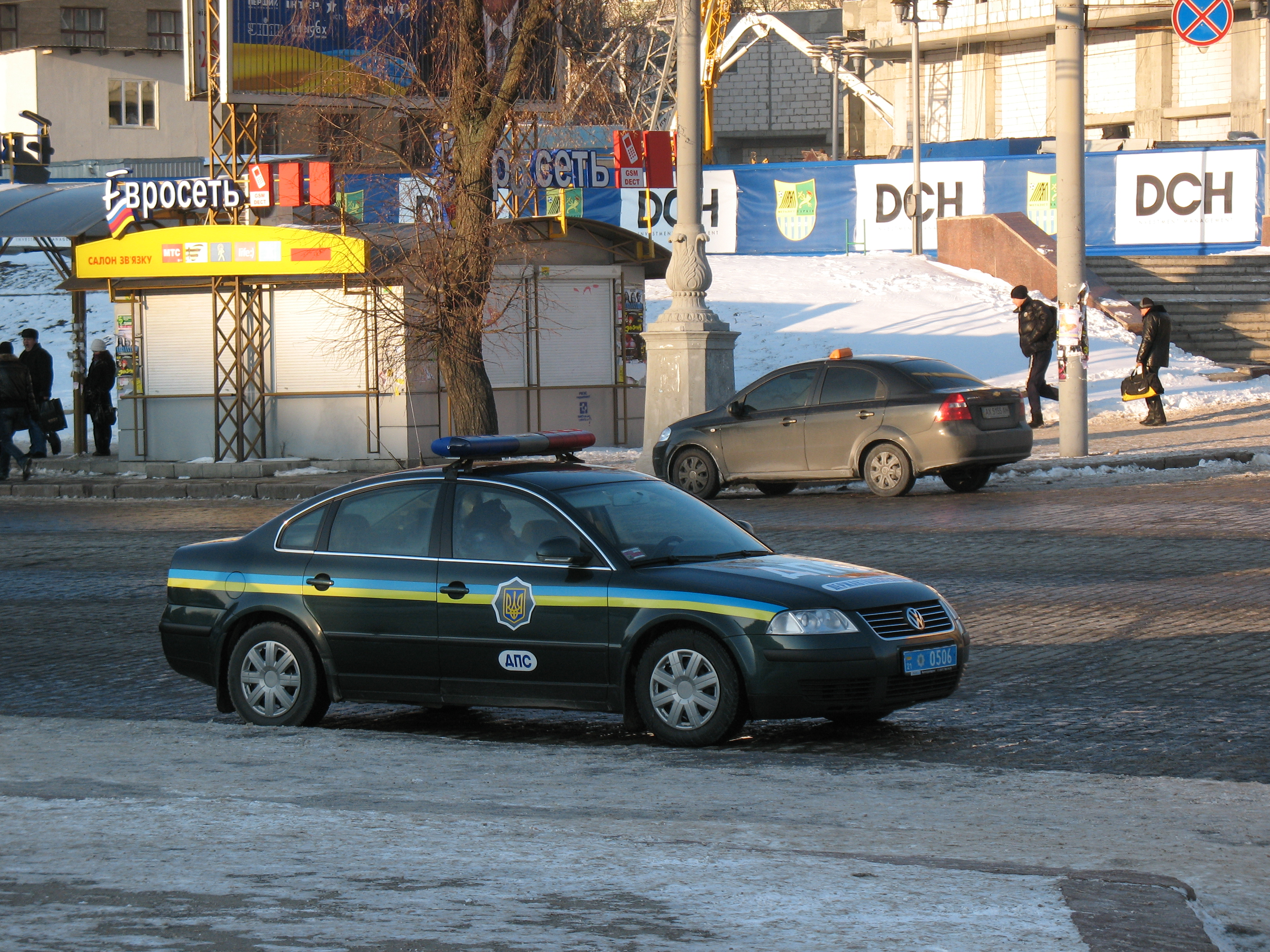
Volkswagen Passat B5

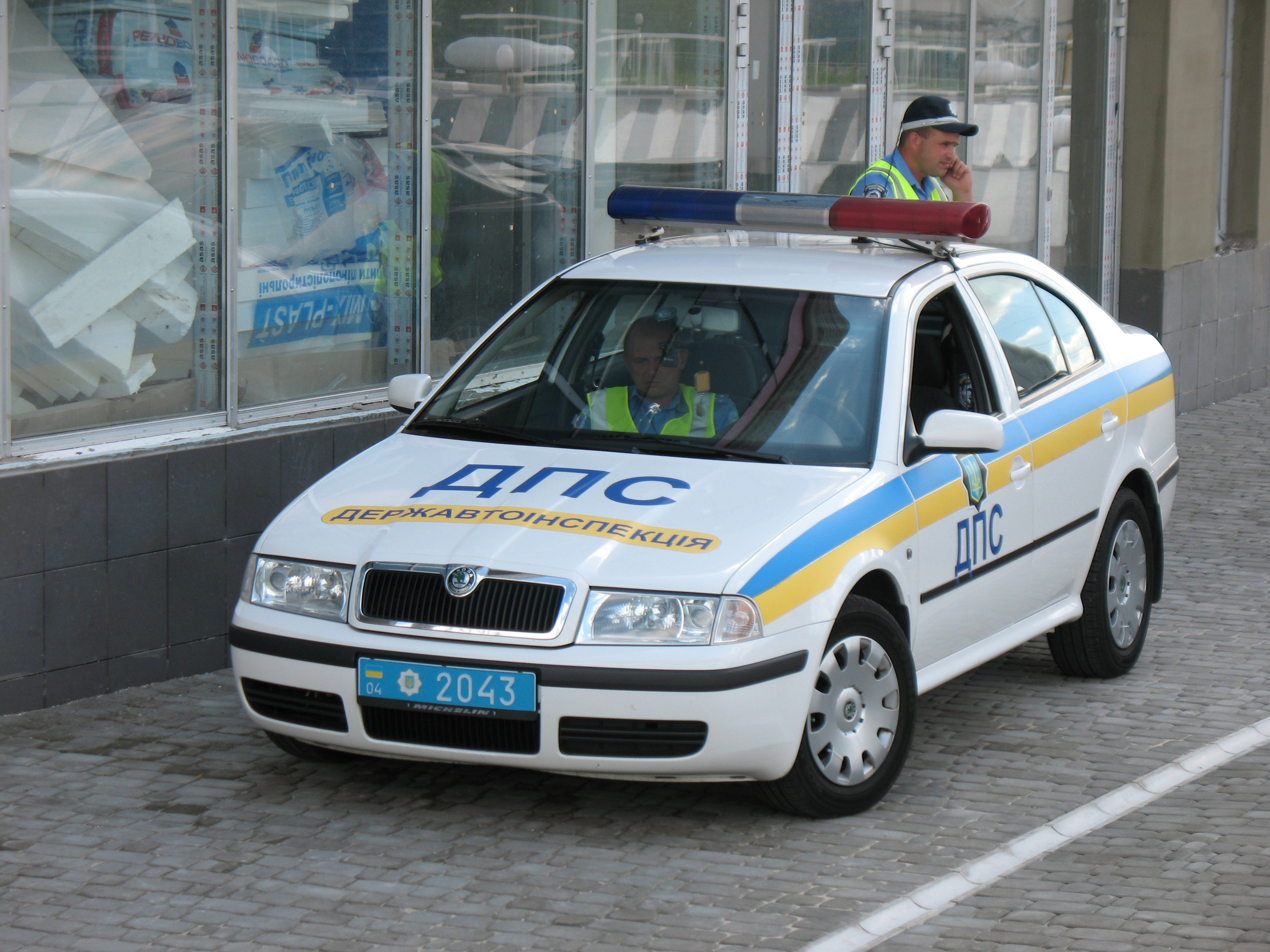
Skoda Octavia road police car

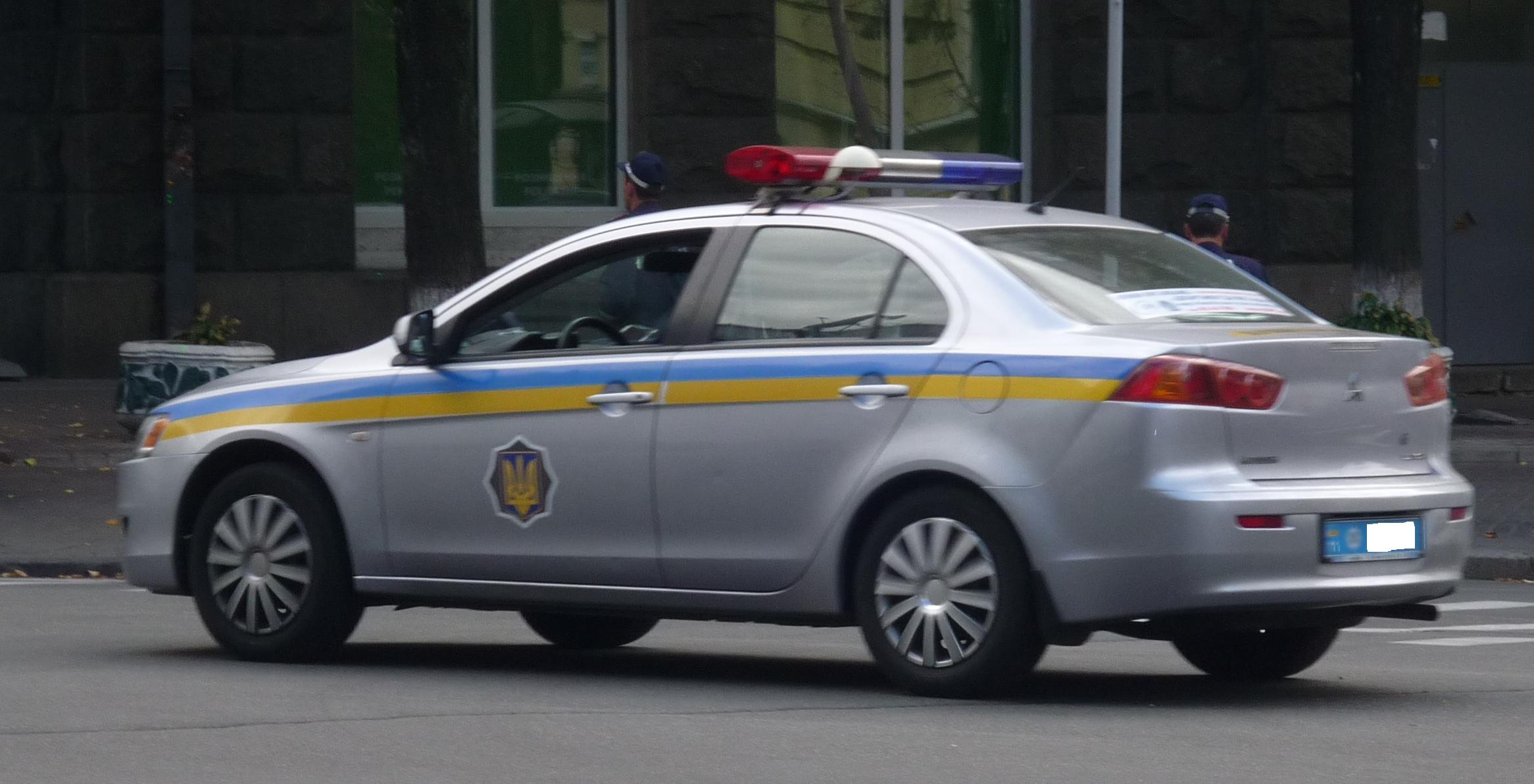
Mitsubishi Lancer police car

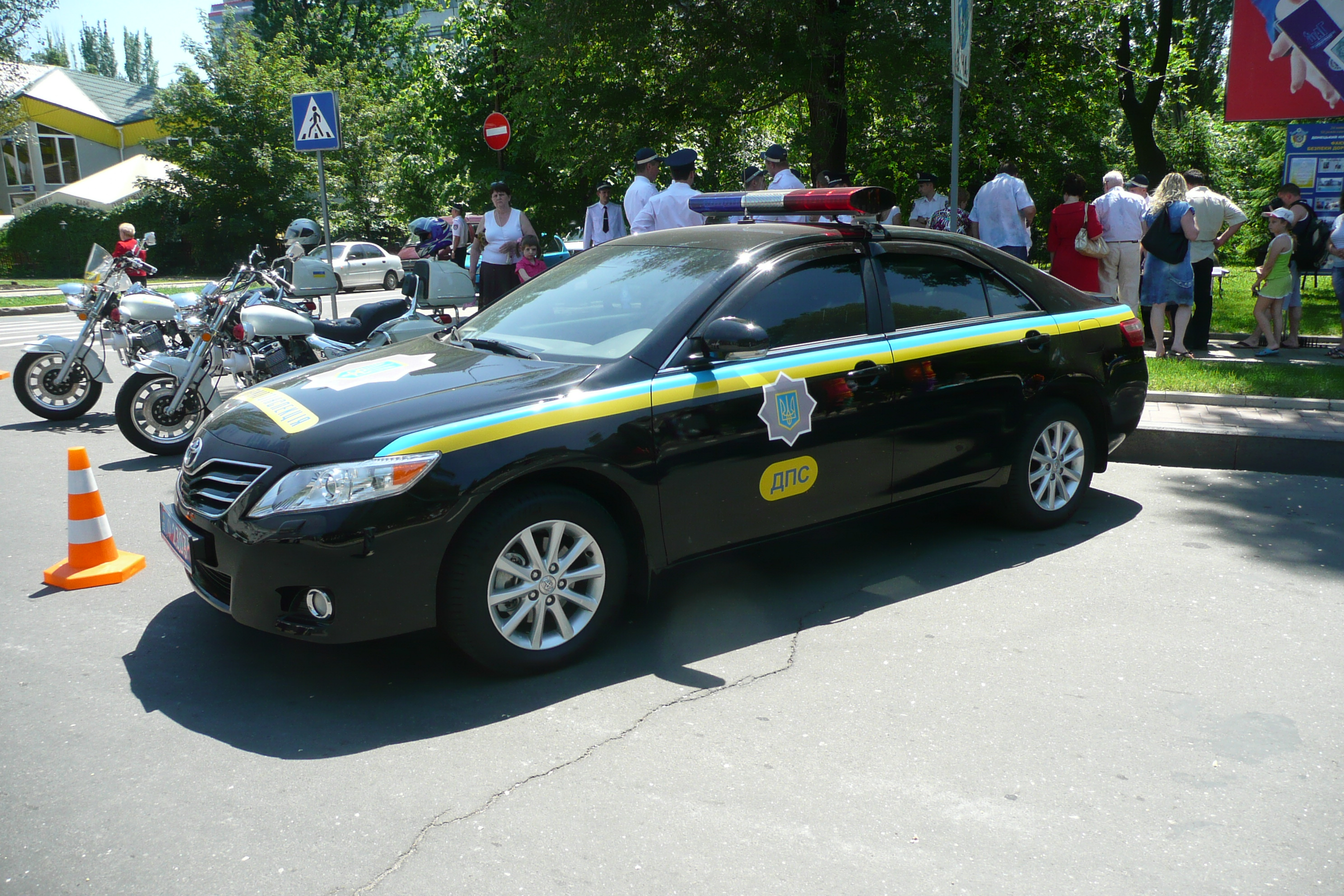
Toyota Camry police car

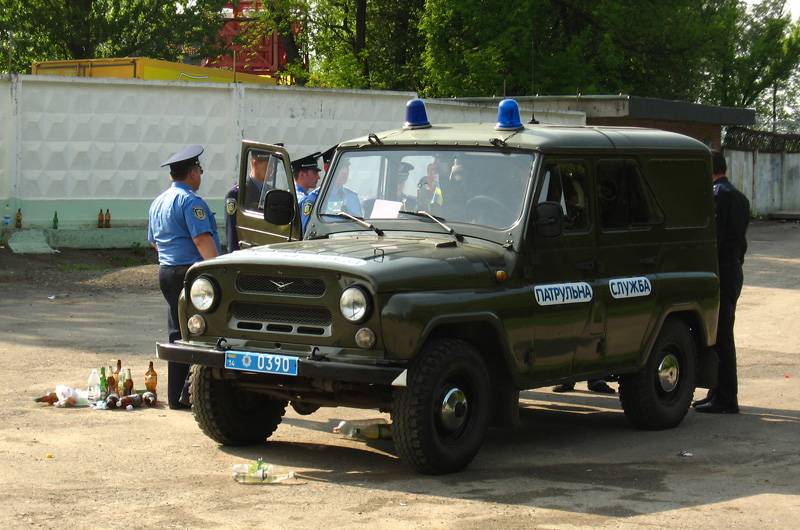
Older UAZ-469 police SUV

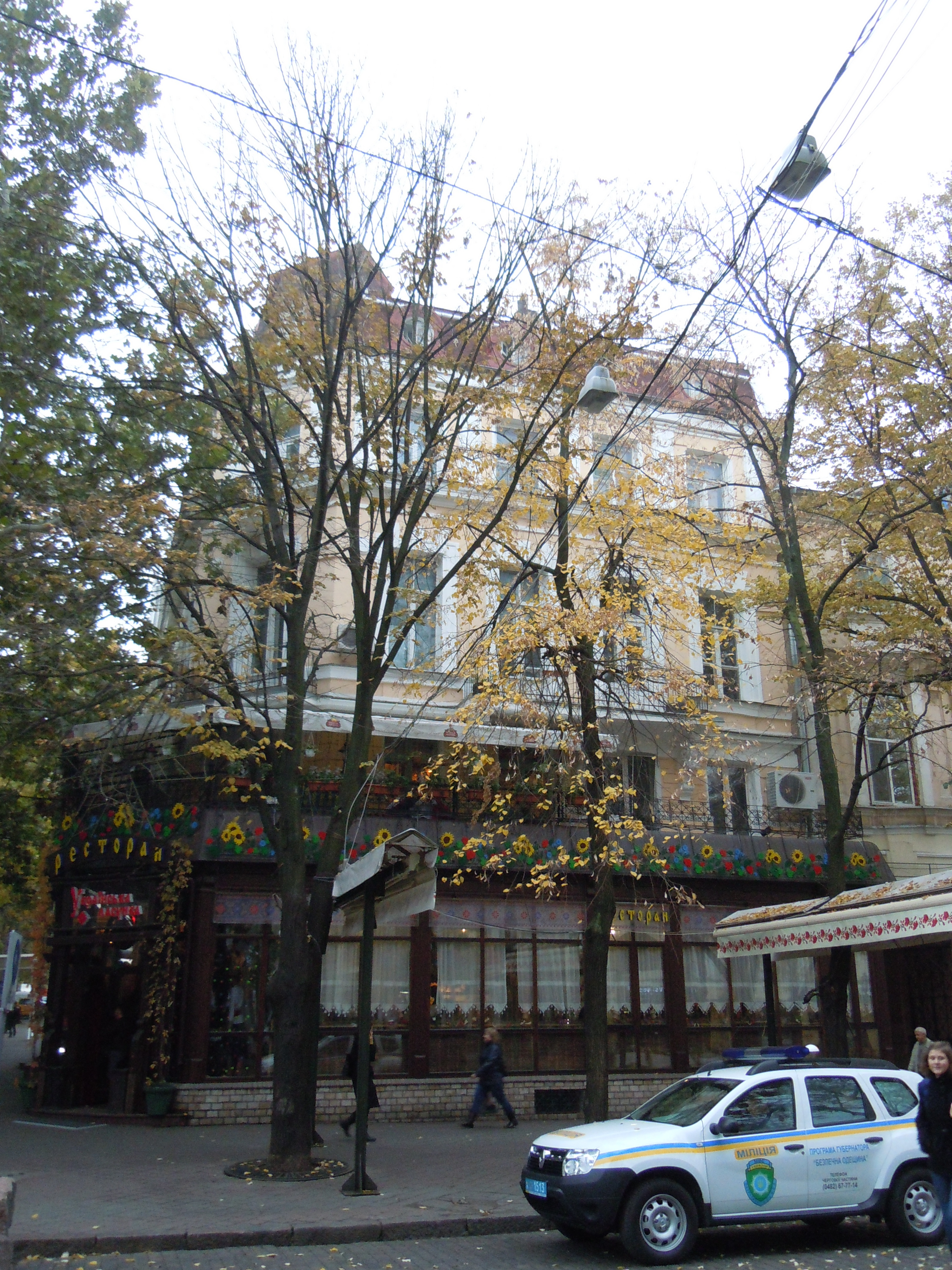
Renault Duster police SUV

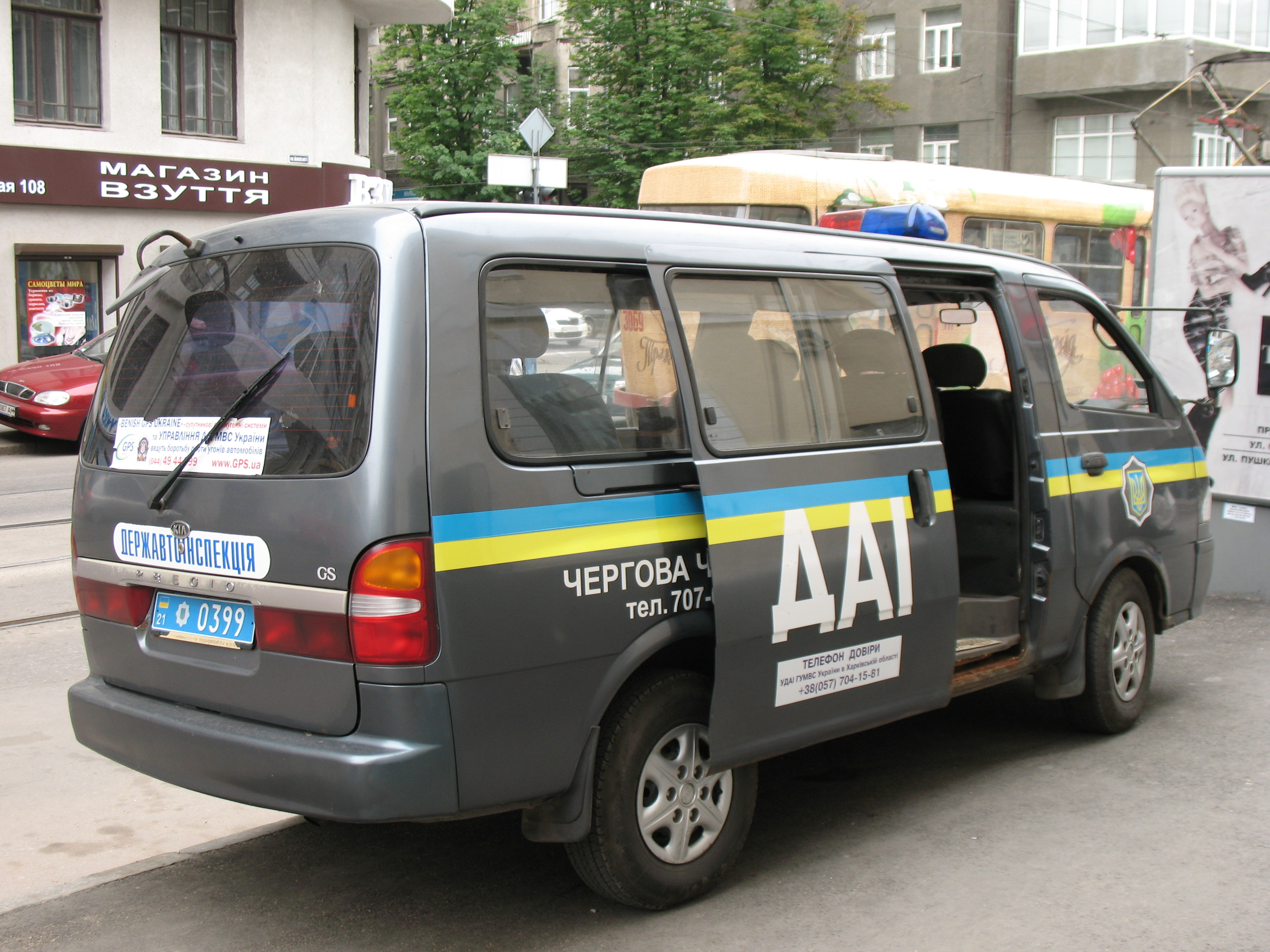
Kia Pregio police van

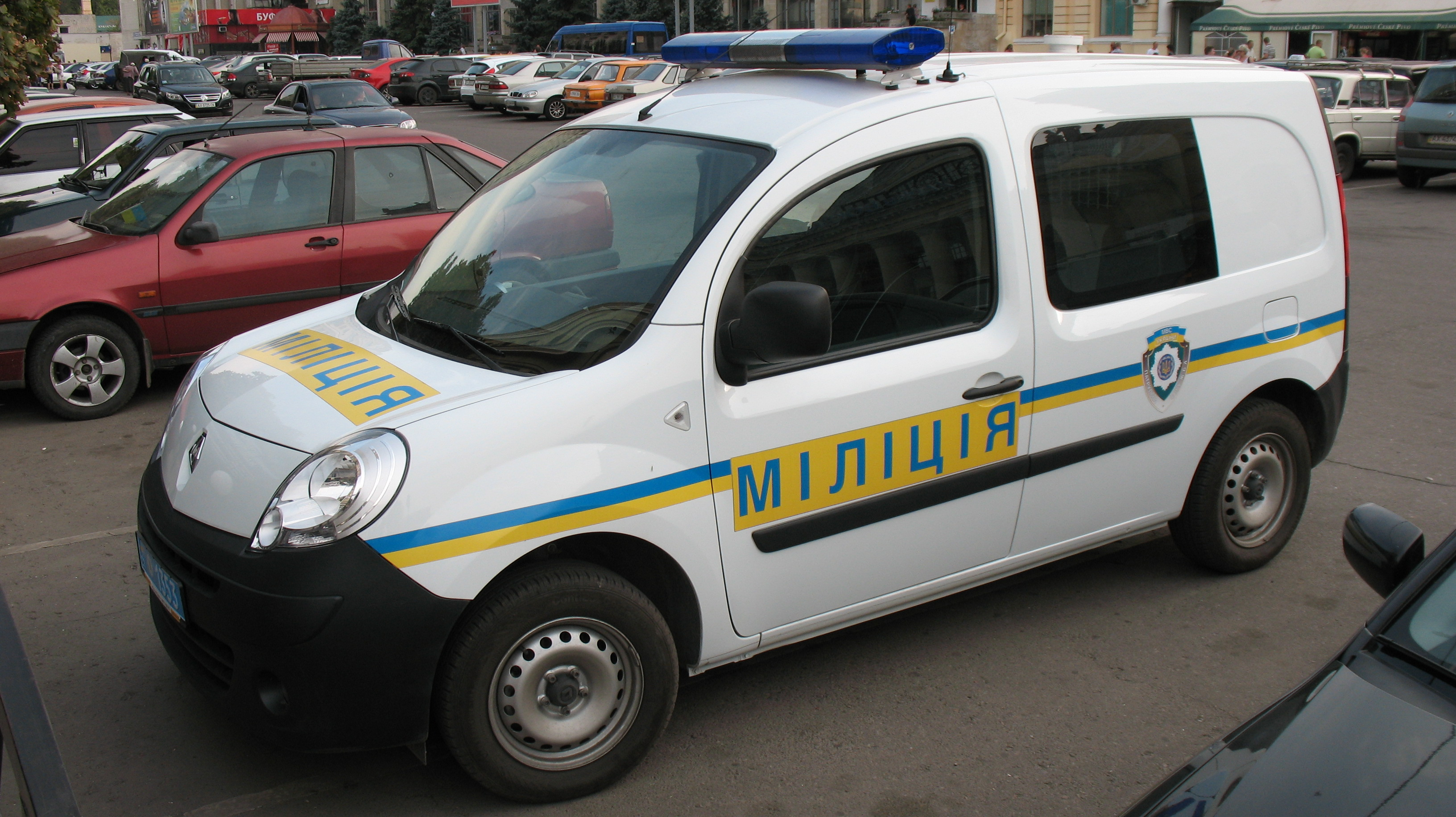
Renault Kangoo police car

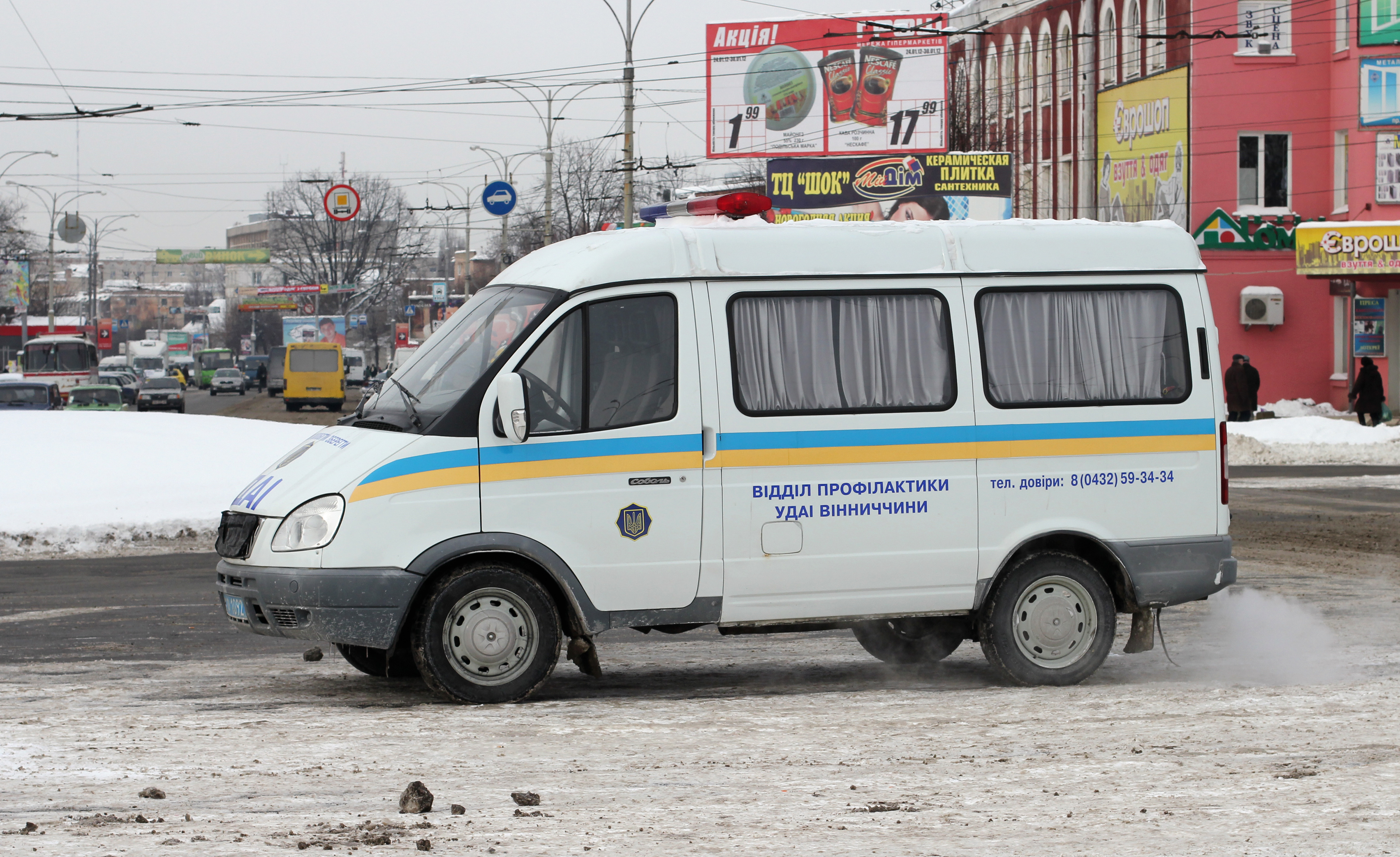
GAZ Sobol police van

== Deployment outside Ukraine ==
Deployments in various UN missions prior to disbandment in 2015:

- Democratic Republic of the Congo: (MONUC) - 3 policemen
- Cyprus: (UNFICYP) - 1 policeman
- Kosovo: (UNMIK) - 1 policeman
- Liberia: (UNMIL) - 19 policemen
- Sudan: (UNMIS) - 19 policemen
- East Timor: (UNMIT) - 10 policemen
- Côte d'Ivoire: (UNOCI) - 4 policemen

== Issues ==
According to Amnesty International, torture and ill-treatment by the militsiya was widespread in Ukraine. This allegation was confirmed by President Viktor Yanukovych in December 2011. Several militia officers were arrested in 2010 for allegedly torturing detainees.

Some militsiya in Ukraine worked as racketeers and debt collectors.

Overall the level of trust in the militsiya and other law enforcement bodies was low. In a 2012 poll, the police were positively assessed by 26%, and negatively by 64%. (Note: In a 2012 United Kingdom poll 79% said they trusted the police very or fairly strongly.)

In 2013, the militsiya received the highest percentage among Ukrainians of having given a bribe to with 49%. Simultaneously they considered (with 64%) its police as the second most corrupt sphere in the country.
