= Aleksandr Uspensky =

Soviet intelligence officer (1902–1940)

- Александр Успенский
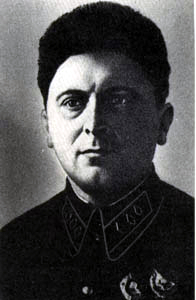

People's Commissar for Internal Affairs of the Ukrainian SSR
- In office 25 January 1938 – 14 November 1938
- Preceded by: Israel Leplevsky
- Succeeded by: Amayak Kobulov (acting)

Personal details
- Born: 27 February 1902 Aleksinsky Uyezd, Tula Governorate, Russian Empire
- Died: 28 January 1940 (aged 37) Moscow, Soviet Union
- Party: All-Union Communist Party (Bolsheviks) (1920–1938)

Military service
- Allegiance: Russian SFSR (1920–1922); Soviet Union (1922–1938)
- Branch/service: Cheka; GPU; OGPU; NKVD
- Years of service: 1920–1938
- Rank: Commissioner of State Security 3rd Rank

Aleksandr Ivanovich Uspensky (Russian: Александр Иванович Успенский; 27 February 1902 – 28 January 1940) was a senior officer of the Cheka, the GPU and the NKVD. Uspensky was both a perpetrator and a victim of the Great Purge.

== Biography ==
Uspensky was born on 14 or 28 February 1902, into the family of a Russian forestry official. He studied at the local theological school in Tula. Uspensky made his career during the Russian Civil War. In August 1920, he joined the Cheka and in September the same year, he also became a member of the Russian Communist Party (b). Later, he rose to be deputy head of security in the Kremlin. In February 1936, he was appointed deputy head of the West Siberian branch of the NKVD. In February 1937, he was appointed head of the NKVD in Orenburg. In this role, he impressed the head of the NKVD, Nikolay Yezhov with his zeal, by having 40,000 supposed 'enemies of the people' arrested. On Yezhov's instructions, all the prisoners over 70 were shot.

Summoned to Moscow for a conference of regional NKVD heads, Uspensky was told by Yezhov on 25 January 1938, that he was being posted to Kiev as head of the Ukrainian branch of the NKVD. In February 1938, Yezhov visited Kiev to give Uspensky a new target to arrest 30,000 people, in addition of the thousands who had already been arrested in Ukraine. During the visit, Yezhov and Uspensky got roaring drunk together. During this time, Uspensky actually led the arrests of about 36,000 people. In June 1938, he declared that "I consider myself a pupil of Nikolai Ivanovich Yezhov", and paid tribute to Nikita Khrushchev, then First Secretary of the Ukraine Communist Party, saying that "only after the faithful Stalinist Nikita Sergeyevich Khrushchev arrived in Ukraine did the smashing of the enemies of the people begin in earnest."

=== Flight and arrest ===
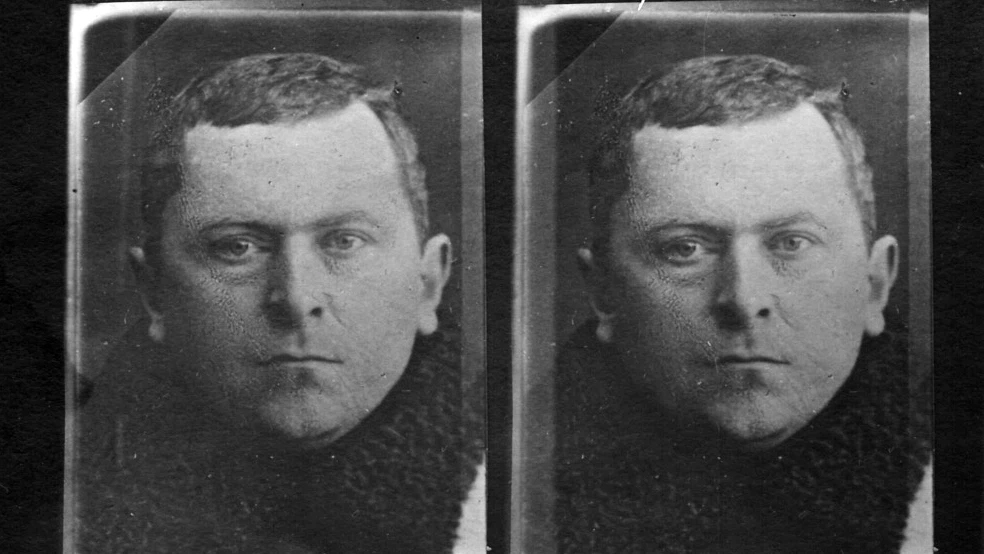
Photo of Uspensky after his arrest

In November 1938, Khrushchev received a call from Stalin telling him that Uspensky was being recalled to Moscow, where he would be arrested. Soon afterwards, there came another phone call, from Yezhov's newly appointed deputy, Lavrentiy Beria, to say that Uspensky had disappeared. After faking his suicide, Uspensky went into hiding on 14 November – possibly having been warned by Yezhov of his impending arrest – and took refuge in the Ural Mountains. He was tracked down and arrested on 15 April 1939 in Miass, Chelyabinsk Oblast. On 29 April, ten NKVD officers received awards for their part in capturing Uspensky. On 27 January 1940, he was sentenced to death and executed the next day.

Unlike many other senior officials and officers, Uspensky was not subsequently rehabilitated.
