= Military history of Latvia during World War II =

After the occupation of Latvia by the USSR in June 1940, much of the previous Latvian army was disbanded and many of its soldiers and officers were arrested and imprisoned or executed. The following year Nazi Germany occupied Latvia during the offensive of Army Group North. The German Einsatzgruppen were aided by a group known as Arajs Kommando in the killing of Latvian Jews as part of the Holocaust. Latvian soldiers fought on both sides of the conflict against their will, and in 1943 180,000 Latvian men were drafted into the Latvian Legion of the Waffen-SS and other German auxiliary forces.

In the Baltic Offensive of autumn 1944 the Soviet Union recaptured much of its Baltic coastline, leaving 200,000 troops of Army Group North cut off in the Courland Pocket. Formed into Army Group Courland, this force held out until the end of the war in May 1945, when it surrendered to the Soviet forces and the troops were sent to prison camps.

Latvia and neighbouring countries before World War II.

== Coup ==
Kārlis Ulmanis staged a bloodless coup d'état on May 15, 1934, establishing a nationalist dictatorship that lasted until 1940. Most of the Baltic Germans left Latvia by agreement between Ulmanis' government and Nazi Germany after the conclusion of the Molotov–Ribbentrop Pact. On October 5, 1939, Latvia was forced to accept a "mutual assistance" pact with the Soviet Union, granting the Soviets the right to station 25,000 troops on Latvian territory. On June 16, 1940, Vyacheslav Molotov presented the Latvian representative in Moscow with an ultimatum accusing Latvia of violations of that pact.

== Soviet annexation ==
On June 17 the Red Army occupied the country. Rigged elections for a "People's Saeima" were held, and a puppet government headed by Augusts Kirhenšteins led Latvia into the USSR. The annexation was formalized on August 5, 1940. The ensuing months would become known in Latvia as Baigais Gads, the Year of Horror. Mass arrests, disappearances, and deportations culminated on the night of June 14, 1941. Prior to the German invasion, in less than a year, at least 27,586 persons were arrested; most were deported, and about 945 persons were shot.

After the occupation of Latvia in June 1940 the annihilation of the Latvian army began. The army was renamed People’s Army, and in September–November 1940, the Red Army’s 24th Territorial Rifle Corps. In September the corps contained 24,416 men but in autumn more than 800 officers and about 10,000 instructors and soldiers were discharged. The arresting of soldiers continued in the following months. In June 1940, the entire Territorial Corps was sent to Litene camp. Before leaving the camp, Latvians drafted in 1939 were demobilised, and replaced by about 4,000 Russian soldiers from area around Moscow. On June 10, the corps senior officers were sent to Russia where they were arrested and most of them shot. On June 14 at least 430 officers were arrested and sent to Gulag camps. After the German attack on the Soviet Union, from June 29 to July 1 more than 2,080 Latvian soldiers were demobilised, fearing that they might turn their weapons against the Russian commissars and officers. Simultaneously, many soldiers and officers deserted and when the corps crossed the Latvian border only about 3,000 Latvian soldiers remained.

== German occupation ==
Operation Barbarossa: the German invasion of the Soviet Union, 21 June 1941 to 5 December 1941 to 9 July 1941 to 1 September 1941 to 9 September 1941 to 5 December 1941

Army Group North's objective was Leningrad via the Baltic States. Comprising the 16th and 18th Armies and 4th Panzer Group, this formation drove through Lithuania, Latvia, Estonia and the cities of Russian SFSR of Pskov and Novgorod. While under German occupation, Latvia was administered as part of Reichskommissariat Ostland. In 1941 empowered by the Einsatzgruppen and Nazi war criminal Franz Walter Stahlecker the far-right-wing extremist group of 500 Arajs Kommando led by Viktors Arājs participated in the Holocaust. 80,000 to 100,000 Latvian citizens were killed during the Nazi occupation, including ca. 70,000 Latvian Jews; about 20,000 Jews brought from Central and Eastern Europe were also murdered in Latvia. Nearly three years later in 1943, forced conscription of 180,000 Latvian men into the German auxiliary forces was ordered by Hitler. Latvian soldiers fought on both sides of the conflict against their will, including in the Latvian Legion of the Waffen-SS, most of them conscripted by the occupying authorities.

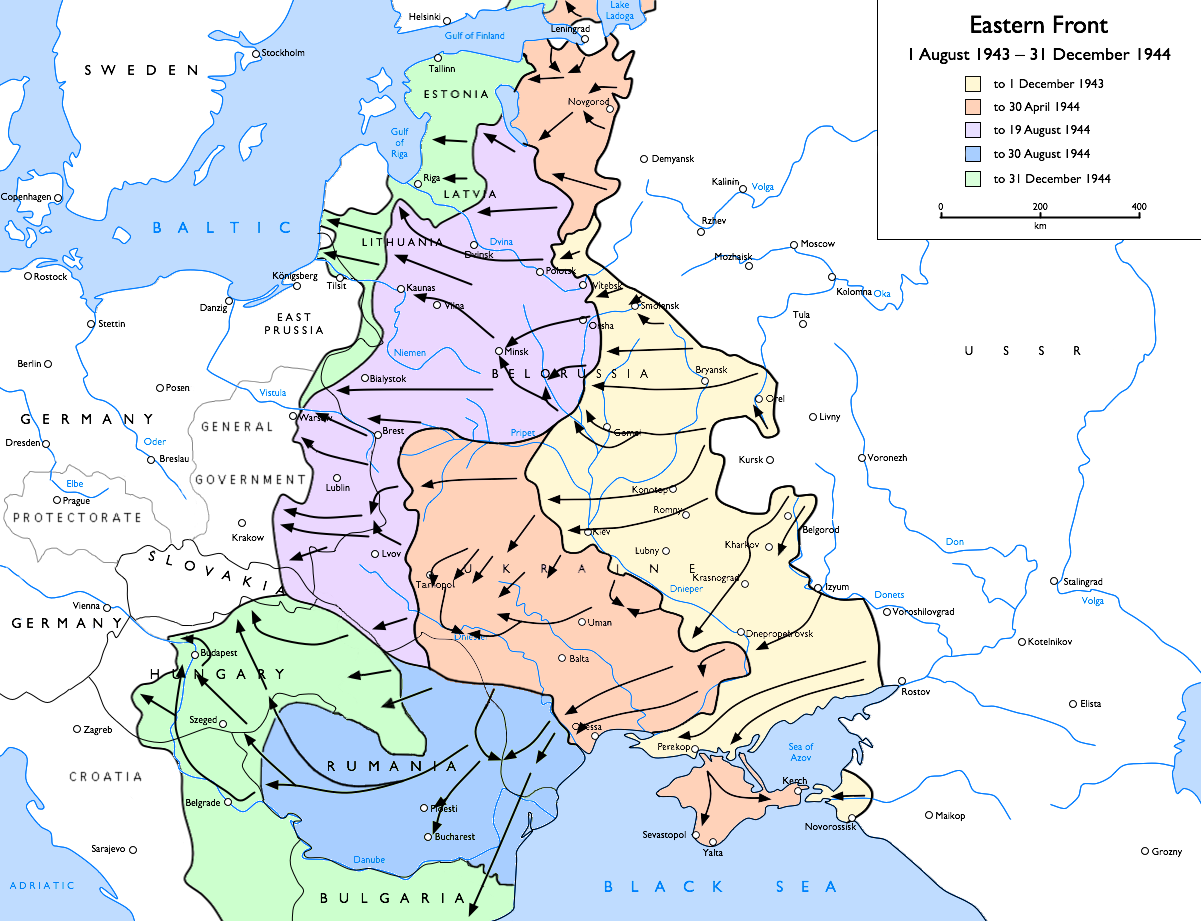
Soviet advances from 1 August 1943 to 31 December 1944 to 1 December 1943 to 30 April 1944 to 19 August 1944 to 31 December 1944

While the Army Group North held back the Soviet Estonian Operation, the Soviet Operation Bagration achieved unbelievable success. Army Group Centre was in tatters, and the northern edge of the Soviet assault threatened to trap Army Group North in a pocket in Courland. Panzers of Hyazinth Graf Strachwitz von Gross-Zauche und Camminetz had been sent back to the capital of Ostland, Riga and in ferocious defensive battles had halted the Soviet advance in late April, 1944. Strachwitz had been needed elsewhere, and was soon back to acting as the Army Group's fire brigade. Strachwitz's Panzerverband was broken up in late July. By early August, the Soviets were again ready to attempt to cut off Army Group North from Army Group Centre.

== Battle of the Baltic ==
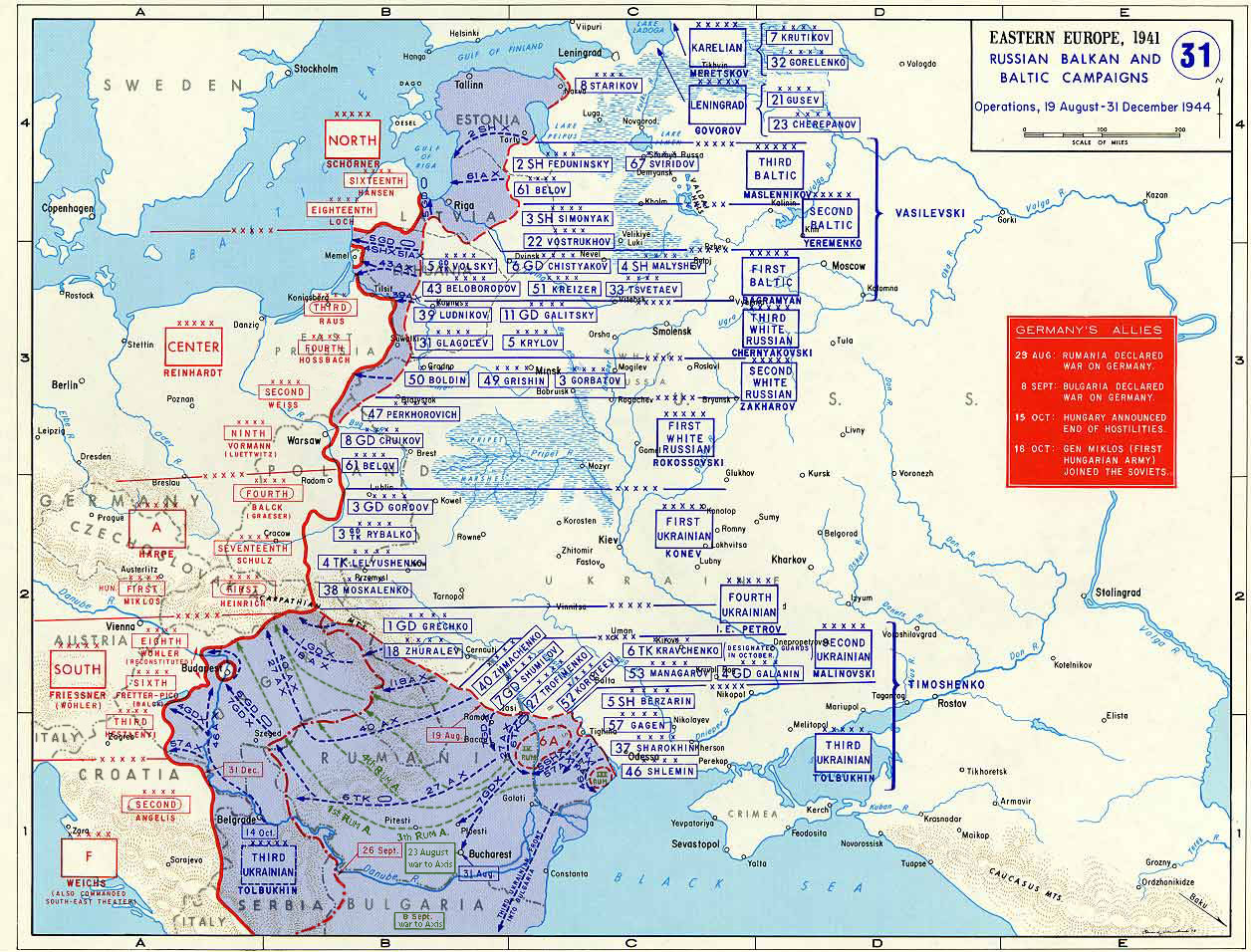
Soviet operations 19 August 1944 to 31 December 1944.

A massive Soviet assault sliced through the German lines and Army Group North was completely isolated from its neighbour. Strachwitz was trapped outside the pocket, and Panzerverband von Strachwitz was reformed, this time from elements of the 101st Panzer Brigade of panzer-ace Oberst Meinrad von Lauchert and the newly formed SS Panzer Brigade Gross under SS-Sturmbannführer Gross. Inside the trapped pocket, the remaining panzers and StuG IIIs of the Hermann von Salza and the last of Jähde's Tigers were formed into another Kampfgruppe to attack from the inside of the trap. On 19 August 1944, the assault, which had been dubbed Unternehmen Doppelkopf (Operation Doppelkopf) got underway. It was preceded by a bombardment by the Cruiser Prinz Eugen's 380mm guns, which destroyed forty-eight T-34s assembling in the square at Tukums. Contact was restored between the army groups. The 101.Panzerbrigade was now assigned to the army detachment "Narwa at the Emajõgi River Front in Estonia, bolstering the defenders' armour strength. Disaster had been averted, but the warning was clear. Army Group North was extremely vulnerable to being cut off. In 1944, the Red Army lifted the siege of Leningrad and re-conquered the Baltic area along with much of Ukraine and Belarus. However, some 200,000 German troops held out in Courland. They were besieged with their backs to the Baltic Sea. They were senselessly stuck there; the Red Army naturally did not pay much attention while concentrating its men and weapons on the attacks on East Prussia, Silesia, Pomerania, and ultimately Berlin. Colonel-General Heinz Guderian, the Chief of the German General Staff, insisted to Adolf Hitler that the troops in Courland should be evacuated by sea and used for the defense of the Reich. However, Hitler refused and ordered the German forces in Courland to hold out. He believed them necessary to protect German submarine bases along the Baltic coast.

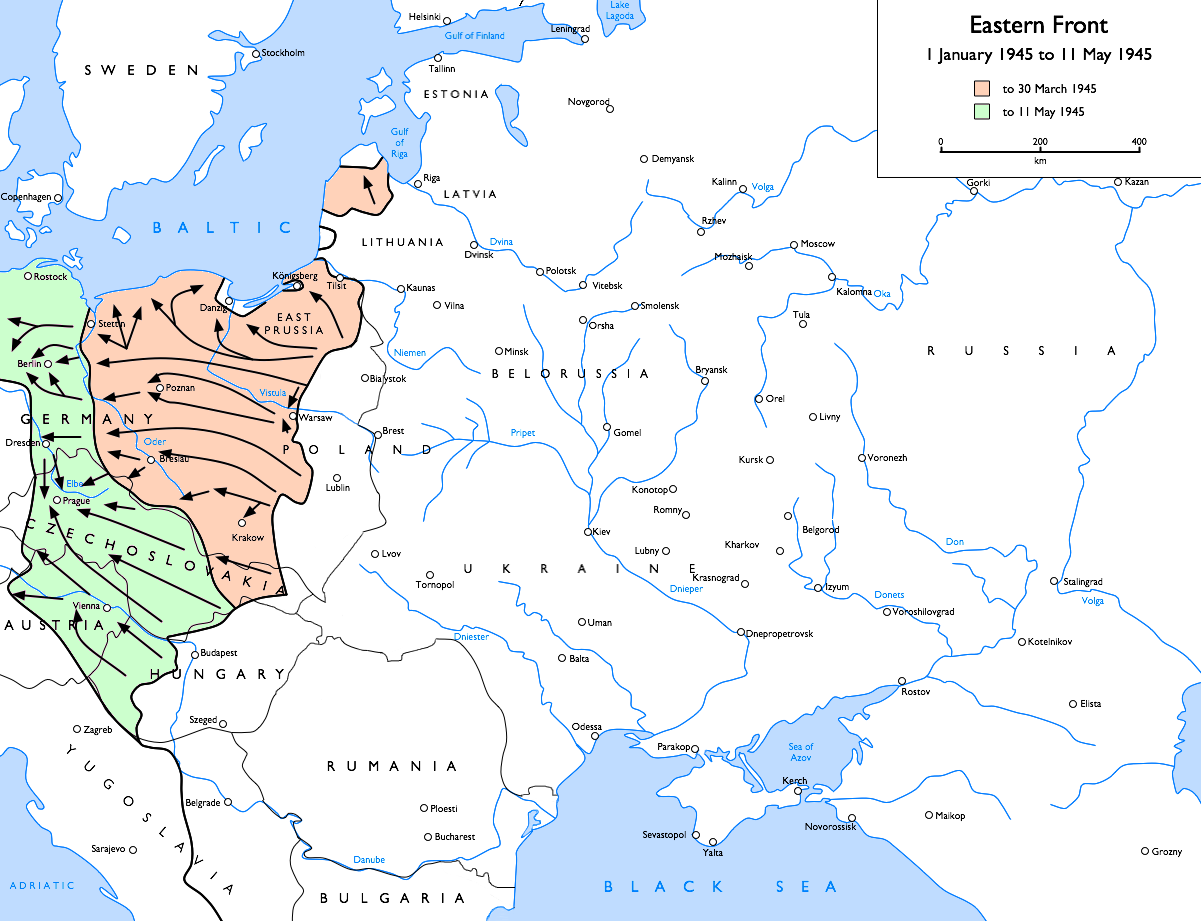
Soviet advances from 1 January 1945 to 7 May 1945

On January 15, 1945, Army Group Courland (Heeresgruppe Kurland) was formed under Colonel-General Dr. Lothar Rendulic. Until the end of the war, Army Group Courland (including divisions such as the Latvian Freiwiliger SS Legion) successfully defended the Courland Peninsula. It held out until May 8, 1945, when it surrendered under Colonel-General Carl Hilpert, the army group's last commander. He surrendered to Marshal Leonid Govorov, the commander of opposing Soviet forces on the Courland perimeter. At this time the group still consisted of some 31 divisions of varying strength. After May 9, 1945 approximately 203,000 troops of Army Group Courland began moving to Soviet prison camps in the East. Many soldiers evaded capture and joined the Forest Brothers resistance that waged unsuccessful guerilla warfare for several years.

== Timeline ==
=== 1939 ===
- August 23, 1939 Molotov–Ribbentrop Pact signed. Pact gave Soviet Union free hand in Estonia, Latvia and Finland.
- October 2, 1939 Soviet Union demands mutual assistance pact with Latvia.
- October 5, 1939 Latvia gives in to Soviet bases demands and Soviet–Latvian Mutual Assistance Treaty signed.

=== 1940 ===
- June 15, 1940 at dawn Soviet troops storm and capture Latvian border posts Masļenki and Šmaiļi.
- June 16, 1940 Similar ultimatums were given to Estonia and Latvia.
- June 17, 1940 Estonia and Latvia gave in to the Soviet demands and are occupied.
- June 20, 1940 New Latvian government of Moscow-approved ministers is formed.
- July 14-July 15, 1940 Elections in Estonia, Latvia and Lithuania, where non-communist candidates were disqualified, harassed and beaten.
- July 21, 1940 New Latvian Saeima accepts wide nationalisation and Sovietization decrees.
- July 22, 1940 The president of Latvia, Kārlis Ulmanis, is arrested and deported to Russia, never returning. He died in a prison in Krasnovodsk on September 20, 1942.
- August 5, 1940 Soviet Union annexes Latvia.

=== 1941 ===
June 14, 1941 The Soviet Union deports 15,424 Latvians including over 3,000 children by train to Siberia.

== See also ==
- Latvian SSR
- Latvian fleet that fought for the Allies in World War II
