= Sovietization of the Baltic states =

The Sovietization of the Baltic states is the sovietization of all spheres of life in Estonia, Latvia, and Lithuania when they were under control of the Soviet Union. The first period deals with the occupation from June 1940 to July 1941, followed by the German occupation during World War II. The second period of occupation covers 1944, when the Soviet forces pushed the Germans out, until the end of the Soviet occupation in 1991, when the three countries restored full independence.

Following the Soviet invasion of the Baltic states in June 1940, repressive measures were enforced in these countries, including arrests, executions, and mass deportations, in accordance with the Serov Instructions. Thousands of opposants and their families were arrested and deported to eliminate any political and social opposition. Rigged elections led the Communist Party to power, and the three countries incorporated the Soviet Union.

After the German occupation, the Soviet Union reoccupied the Baltic states from 1944, sparking several years of armed resistance from groups like the Forest Brothers. This insurgency persisted until the deportation and resettlement of thousands of people, weakening the resistance movement and ending it in the mid-1950s. Soviet governments in the Baltic states conformed to Soviet policies, including nationalizing industries, enforcing censorship, and severely restricting religious liberties. The Baltic states experienced territorial changes under Soviet rule. At the end of the 1980s, as the influence of the Soviet Union decreased, peaceful demonstrations known as the Singing Revolution in the Baltic states ultimately led to their independence.

== Immediate post occupation ==
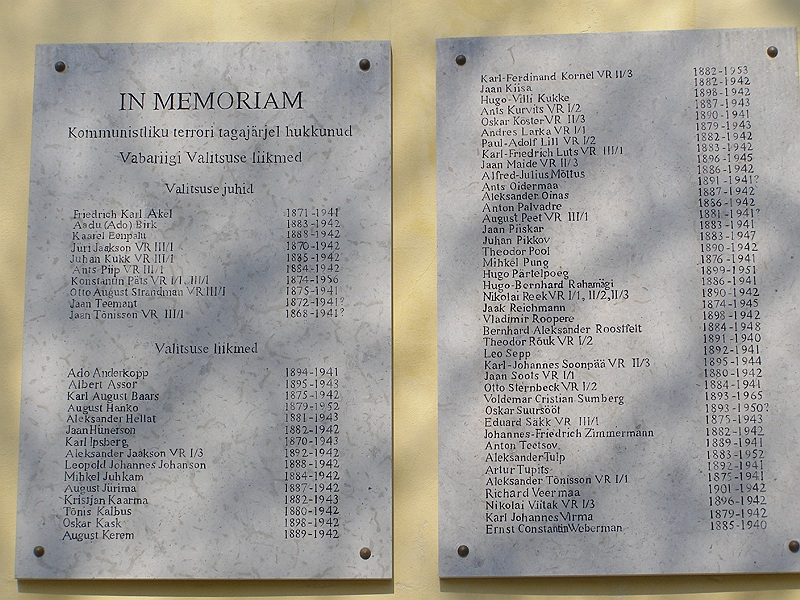
Plaque on the building of Government of Estonia, Toompea, commemorating government members killed by communist terror

After the Soviet invasion of Estonia, Latvia, and Lithuania in June 1940, the repressions followed with the arrests, executions, and mass deportations carried out by the Soviets. The Serov Instructions, "On the Procedure for carrying out the Deportation of Anti-Soviet Elements from Lithuania, Latvia, and Estonia", contained detailed instructions for procedures and protocols to observe in the deportation of Baltic nationals.

The local Communist parties emerged from underground with 1500 members in Lithuania, 500 in Latvia, and 133 members in Estonia.

== Transitional governments 1940 ==
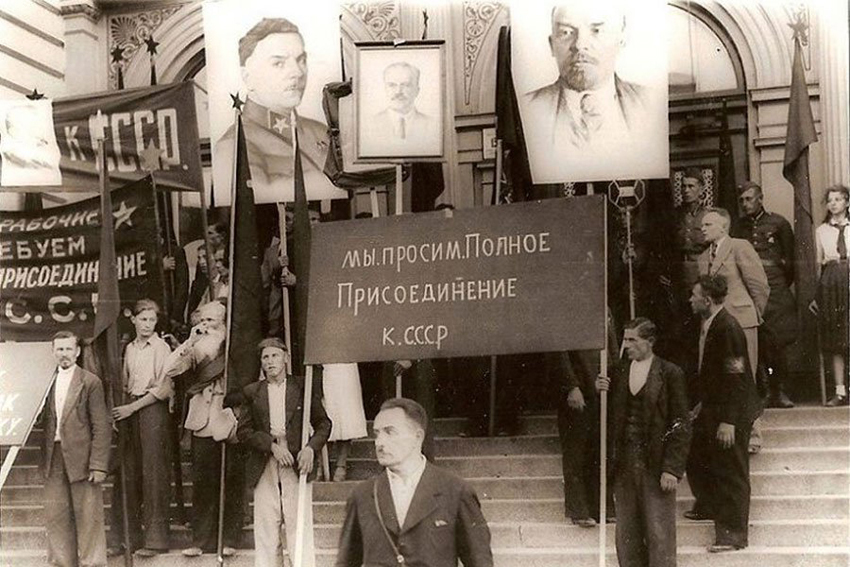
Soviet propaganda demonstration in Liepāja, 1940. Posters in Russian say: "We demand the full accession to the USSR!"

The Stalinist Soviet regime initiated a constitutional metamorphosis of the three Baltic states by first forming transitional "Peoples Governments." Led by Stalin's close associates, the local communist supporters and those brought in from the Soviet Union forced the presidents and governments of all three countries to resign, replacing them with the provisional "people's governments".

The Soviets did not immediately install the virtually unknown leaders of the tiny existing Communist parties in each country, and instead put together a broadly left-wing coalition while simultaneously having Soviet emissaries present lists for cabinet installations about which even minor changes would not be sanctioned. The new cabinets at first denied any intention of setting up Soviet regimes, not to mention incorporation into the Soviet Union, instead claiming only to remove "fascist" politicians from office.

In late June and early July 1940, the cabinets announced that the Communist Parties were the only legal political parties. All non-Communist controlled public activity was proscribed, while political, social ideological, and religious groups which could be subsumed into the Communist fronts were disbanded, including even the Boy Scouts. Police forces were replaced by specially recruited militias. Formed "Peoples Armies" were rapidly Sovietized in preparation for their eventual absorption into the Red Army.

== Rigged elections 1940 ==
On July 14–15, 1940, rigged parliamentary elections for the "People's Parliaments" were conducted by local Communists loyal to the Soviet Union. Because of newly installed election restrictions, only the Communists and their allies were effectively allowed to run. The election results were completely fabricated to give the Communists large majorities; the Soviet press service released them early, with the result that they had already appeared in print in a London newspaper a full 24 hours before the polls closed.

The new assemblies met for the first time in late July, in each case with a single order of business—petitions to join the Soviet Union. This belied claims prior to the elections that no such action would be taken. In each case, the petitions passed. In due course, the Soviet Union "accepted" all three petitions and formally annexed the three countries. The Soviet Union, and later Russia, used these votes to buttress its claim that the Baltic peoples had voluntarily requested to join the Soviet Union after carrying out socialist revolutions in their countries.

Public tribunals were also set up to punish "traitors to the people": those who had fallen short of the "political duty" of voting their countries into the USSR.

== Mass deportations 1940–1941 ==
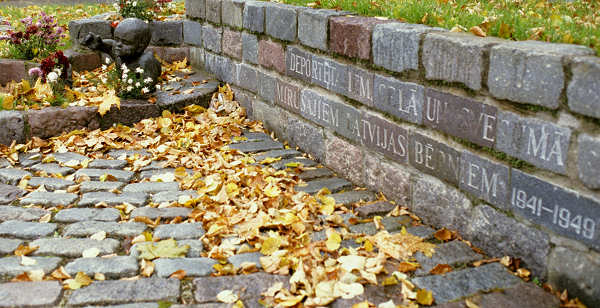
Memorial to deported Latvian children who died in exile, 1941–1949

Immediately after the elections, NKVD units under the leadership of Ivan Serov arrested more than 15,000 "hostile elements" and members of their families. Arrests and deportations began slowly, partly because of the language problems, as not enough Soviet officials were capable of reading the local language documents. In the first year of Soviet occupation, from June 1940 to June 1941, the number confirmed executed, conscripted, or deported is estimated at a minimum of 124,467: 59,732 in Estonia, 34,250 in Latvia, and 30,485 in Lithuania. This included eight former heads of state and 38 ministers from Estonia, three former heads of state and 15 ministers from Latvia, and the then president, five prime ministers, and 24 other ministers from Lithuania. A large-scale operation was planned for the night of 27–28 June 1941. It was postponed until after the war when the Germans invaded the USSR on June 22, 1941 – Operation Barbarossa. A Lithuanian government official claimed to have seen a Soviet document suggesting that 700,000 deportations were envisaged from Lithuania alone.

According to historian Robert Conquest, the selective deportations from the Baltic States represented the policy of "decapitation" of the nation by removing its political and social elite, "as was later evidently to be the motive for the Katyn massacre."

== Soviet governments 1940–1941 ==
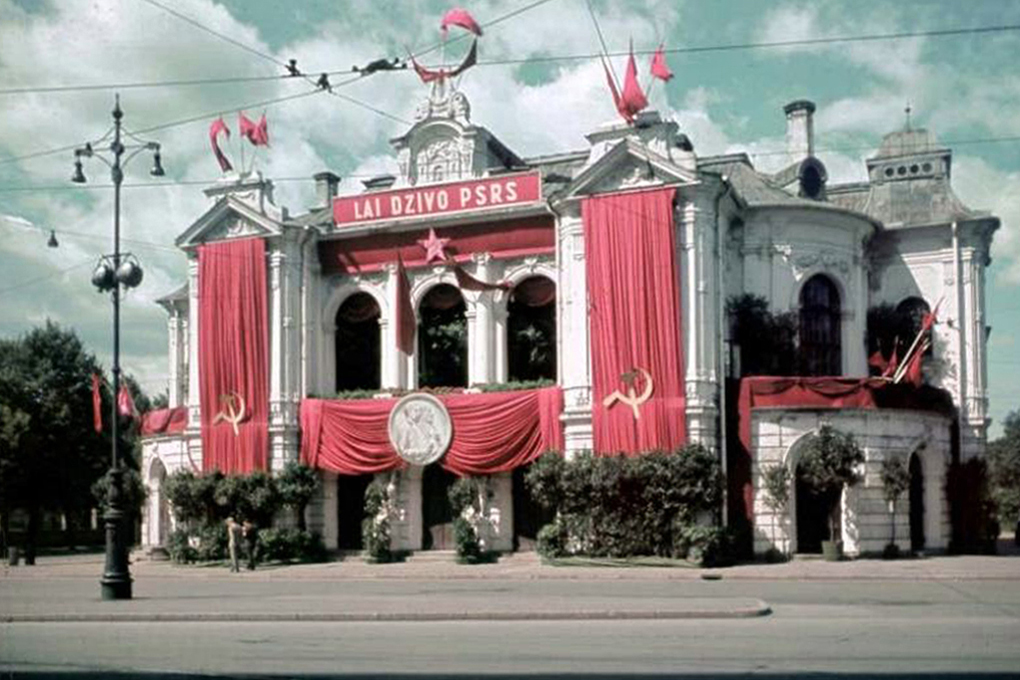
Latvian National Theatre decorated with Soviet symbols (hammer and sickle, red star, red flags and a double portrait of Lenin and Stalin) after the Soviet occupation in 1940. The text on top reads "Long live the USSR!"

The new Soviet-installed governments in the Baltic states began to align their policies with current Soviet practices. According to the prevailing doctrine in the process, the old "bourgeois" societies were destroyed so that new socialist societies, run by loyal Soviet citizens, could be constructed in their place. The reconstituted parliaments quickly proclaimed the nationalization of large industries, transportation, banks, private housing, and commerce in general. Although the land was now considered the property of the people, for the time being, the regimes expropriated only those holdings comprising 30 or more hectares (about 66 acres). Around 100,000 ethnic German citizens were allowed to sell their land and property and leave the Baltic counties, and if they were racially acceptable, were resettled in Poland and given land and businesses in exchange for the money they had received from the sale of their previous possessions.

By creating large numbers of small, nonviable farms, the Soviet regime intended to weaken the institution of private landholding so that later collectivization, a program of agricultural consolidation that was undertaken in the USSR a decade earlier, could be presented as an efficient alternative. The Red Army quickly absorbed the military forces of the Baltic states. Soviet security forces, such as the NKVD, imposed strict censorship and press control. In each of the new republics, churches and ecclesiastical property were nationalized, religious education and religious publications were forbidden, seminaries and monasteries were seized (often for the Red Army), and many clergymen were arrested.

== Western protests 1940 ==
Between July and August 1940, Estonian, Latvian, and Lithuanian envoys to the United States and the United Kingdom made official protests against Soviet occupation and annexation of their countries. The United States, in accordance with the principles of the Stimson Doctrine (Sumner Welles' Declaration of July 23, 1940), as well as most other Western countries, never formally recognized the annexation, but did not directly interfere with Soviet control. The Baltic states continued their de jure existence in accordance with international law.

Diplomatic and consular representations of the Baltic states continued to function between 1940 - 1991 in some Western countries (United States, Australia, Switzerland). Members of Estonian, Latvian, and Lithuanian diplomatic services in Western countries continued to formulate and express the official opinion of Estonia, Latvia, and Lithuania, and protected the interests of these countries and their citizens abroad between 1940–1991, i.e., until the restoration of independence of the Baltic states.

== World War II 1944 re-occupation ==
The Soviet Union reoccupied the Baltic states as part of the Baltic Offensive in 1944, a twofold military-political operation to rout German forces and the "liberation of the Soviet Baltic peoples" beginning in summer-autumn 1944, lasting until the capitulation of German and Latvian forces in the Courland pocket in May 1945. An insurgency continued, resisting Soviet rule via armed struggle for a number of years. The Forest brothers, as they were known, enjoyed the material support among the local population, as well as from the British (MI6), American, and Swedish secret intelligence services.

On January 12, 1949, in an effort to end the insurgency, the Soviet Council of Ministers issued a decree "on the expulsion and deportation" from Baltic states of "all kulaks and their families, the families of bandits and nationalists", and others. More than 200,000 people are estimated to have been deported from the Baltic in 1940–1953. In addition, at least 75,000 were sent to the Gulag. 10 percent of the entire adult Baltic population was deported or sent to labor camps, effectively breaking the back of the insurgency.

After World War II, as part of the goal to more fully integrate Baltic countries into the Soviet Union, mass deportations were concluded in the Baltic countries and the policy of encouraging Soviet immigration to the Baltic states continued.

== Independence in 1991 ==
In July 1989, following the dramatic events in East Germany (the fall of the Berlin Wall), the Supreme Soviets in each of the Baltic countries adopted a "Declaration of Sovereignty" and amended the Constitutions to assert the supremacy of their own laws over those of the USSR. Candidates from the pro-independence party Popular Fronts gained a majority in the Supreme Councils in the 1990 democratic elections. The Councils declared their intention to restore full independence.

Soviet political and military forces tried unsuccessfully to overthrow the governments. In 1991, Baltic countries claimed de facto independence. International recognition, including ultimately that of the USSR, followed. The United States, which had never recognized forcible annexation of the Baltic countries by the USSR, resumed full diplomatic relations with the republics.

== See also ==
- Sovietization
- Russification
