= Panzer brigade =

Panzer Brigades were formations in the German Army during World War II.

== Concept ==
The 1st Panzer Brigade was organized in 1934, followed by others during Germany's rearmament. Before the war, a Panzer Brigade was composed of a staff and two panzer regiments.

From the beginning of the war in 1939 Panzer Brigades were present and operational in the German Order of Battle until at least the summer of 1943. Apart from the official Order of Battle, German tank forces often operated in ad hoc formations, especially after the reverse of fortunes on the battlefield required makeshift units to tackle crisis situations more often. The philosophy behind these brigades was that smaller but stronger tank units could manoeuvre and counteract more swiftly than cumbersome panzer divisions, which can be easily detected by enemy intelligence. Nevertheless, when Hitler ordered the creation of the Panzer Brigades in July 1944, they were rather born out of necessity than a new defence doctrine of the German armed forces. Ten Panzer Brigades are created on July 7, 1944 on the orders of Adolf Hitler in an attempt to stabilize the Eastern Front. The order resulted from observations on the successes of ad-hoc kampfgruppes like Schwere Panzer Regiment under Oberst Franz Bäke. Hitler believed that small, mobile, fast and armored Kampfgruppes could be useful during this situation and such Kampfgruppe could quickly be sent into action to meet the attacking enemy armored spearheads. He thought that the appropriate organization for these Kampfgruppe should be one panzergrenadier battalion mounted in half-tracks, one panzer battalion with thirty to forty Panther tanks, one anti-tank company and several mobile anti-aircraft guns. He also requested about twelve of such Kampfgruppe, named as Brigades.

The creation of Panzer Brigades was opposed by Generaloberst Heinz Guderian, Inspector General for Armor, because these new units would hinder the replacement of losses and the necessary refitting of worn-out Panzer Divisions.

== Organization ==
There were two types of Panzer Brigades, the first ten (101st to 110th) contained a reduced panzer battalion and a battalion of panzergrenadiers in half-tracks. The second wave (111th to 113th) were created in early September 1944. The organization of these three brigades was quite different from that of previous ones. The Panzer component was equipped with a battalion-size Abteilung (detachment) of Panzer IV and another one with Panther tanks. The Panzergrenadier component of the brigade was expanded to a full regiment with two battalions, but the detail composition of the regiment was unclear. The other supportive components included one armoured reconnaissance company, one armoured engineer company and one Sturmgeschütz (assault gun) company. Thus, these brigades could field two Panzer and two Panzergrenadier battalions. According to Eddy Bayer, there was one Tiger battalion (50 units), one Panzer Mark IV battalion (30 units), two panzergrenadier battalions on half-armoured trucks and one assault guns regiment (27 self-propelled guns). Aside from the Panzer Brigades above, there were also ad-hoc units that were known as Panzer Brigades; there was a Panzer Brigade that was actually a commando unit (Panzer Brigade 150).

== Panzer Brigades, 1939–41 ==
- 1st Panzer Brigade
- 2nd Panzer Brigade
- 3rd Panzer Brigade
- 4th Panzer Brigade
- 5th Panzer Brigade
- 6th Panzer Brigade
- 8th Panzer Brigade
- 10th Panzer Brigade
- 18th Panzer Brigade
- 21st Panzer Brigade
- 100th Panzer Brigade

== Panzer Brigades, 1944–45 ==
- 101st Panzer Brigade - part of Panzerverband Strachwitz, absorbed by 20th Panzer Division
- 102nd Panzer Brigade - absorbed by 7th Panzer Division
- 103rd Panzer Brigade - absorbed by 5th Panzer Division
- 104th Panzer Brigade - absorbed by 25th Panzer Division
- 105th Panzer Brigade - absorbed by 9th Panzer Division
- 106th Panzer Brigade - absorbed by Panzer Division Clausewitz
- 107th Panzer Brigade - upgraded to 25th Panzergrenadier Division
- 108th Panzer Brigade
- 109th Panzer Brigade
- 110th Panzer Brigade - absorbed by 13th Panzer Division
- 111th Panzer Brigade - absorbed by 11th Panzer Division
- 112th Panzer Brigade - absorbed by 21st Panzer Division
- 113th Panzer Brigade - absorbed by 15th Panzergrenadier Division
- SS Panzer Brigade Gross - part of Panzerverband Strachwitz
- SS Brigade Westfalen
- Panzer Brigade 150 - known as a Panzer Brigade, but actually was a commando unit in the Battle of the Bulge

== Results ==
With few exceptions, like the 106th Panzer Brigade, the Panzer Brigades were short-lived. Most were eventually disbanded by absorption into existing panzer and panzergrenadier divisions.
