= 113th Panzer Brigade =

- Active: 4 September - 1 October 1944
- Country: Nazi Germany
- Branch: Army
- Type: Panzer
- Role: Armoured warfare
- Size: Brigade
- Engagements: World War II: Western Front; Battle of Arracourt

Commanders
- Notable commanders: Erich Freiherr von Seckendorff

The 113th Panzer Brigade was a tank formation of the German Army in World War II. As a tank formation, it was part of the Panzer Arm (Panzerwaffe).

== History ==
The 113th Panzer Brigade was formed on 4 September 1944.

Unlike earlier Panzer Brigades, it was equipped with two battalions of Panzer IV and Panther tanks, with two mechanized panzergrenadier battalions, instead of one battalion each. On paper, it was a strong formation. However, it lacked sufficient supporting units such as reconnaissance, artillery and engineers, which made a Panzer Division a lethal combination of armor and infantry. On 6 September the brigade was sent to Colmar and on 16 September sent to Saarburg. Assigned to the 5th Panzer Army, it participated in the Battle of Arracourt, as the Germans attempted to stop the US Third Army's penetrations in Lorraine. By that time, the brigade had 42 Panther tanks.

During the battle for Hill 318 at Arracourt, an ad-hoc Kampfgruppe was formed from the remnants of the 113th Panzer Brigade commanded by Oberstleutnant Erich Hammon.

The battle resulted in German defeat and the virtual destruction of the 113th Panzer Brigade, leaving its commander, Oberst Erich Freiherr von Seckendorff dead in the battle as well.

On 1 October 1944, the 113th Panzer Brigade was disbanded, and its shattered remnants was assigned to the 15th Panzergrenadier Division.

== Order of battle ==
- 2113th Panzer Battalion
- I/130th Panzer Regiment
- 2113th Panzer Grenadier Regiment
- 2113th Brigade Support Units
- 2113th Panzer Reconnaissance Company
- 2113th Flak Company
- 2113th Sturmgeschütz Battalion
