= Amayak Kobulov =

Soviet politician

People's Commissar for Internal Affairs of the Uzbek SSR
- In office July 1941 – January 1945

People's Commissar for Internal Affairs of the Ukrainian SSR
- In office December 1938 – 1939
- Preceded by: Alexander Uspensky
- Succeeded by: Ivan Serov

Personal details
- Born: Amayak Zakharovich Kobulov; 1906 Tiflis, Russian Empire
- Died: 26 February 1955 (aged 49) Moscow, RSFSR, USSR
- Cause of death: executed by firing squad
- Occupation: politician
- Known for: Member of the Soviet security and police apparatus
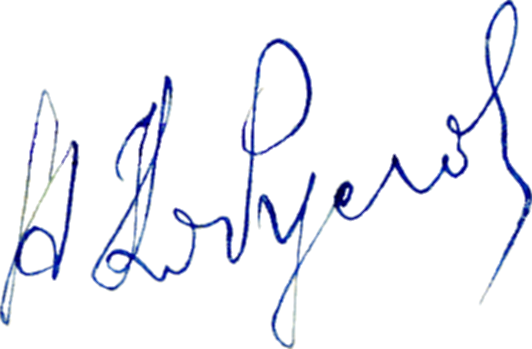
- Signature

Amayak Zakharovich Kobulov (Russian: Амаяк Захарович Кобулов; 1906–1955) was a Soviet politician and member of the Soviet security (OGPU-NKVD) and police apparatus during and briefly after the Joseph Stalin years, as was his older brother Bogdan Kobulov.

== Early career ==
Amayak Kobulov was a tailor's son, born in Tiflis. He served in the Red Army in 1921–1923, then worked as an accountant. In 1927, he joined the Georgian OGPU as an accountant in its finance department. During the Great Purge, in 1937, Lavrentiy Beria promoted him to a position in the Main Political Directorate of the Georgian NKVD, then in 1938, acting head of the NKVD in the Abkhaz republic, which meant that he was in charge of security around Stalin's holiday villa, in Gagra. He received another major promotion in December 1938 when he was appointed First Deputy head of the Ukraine NKVD, soon after Beria had taken over control of the NKVD in Moscow.

== Espionage ==
In the history of Soviet espionage he is noted for his stint in Berlin as chief of the Main Directorate of State Security Foreign Branch's rezidentura from September 1939 until June 1941. One historian has commented that "the appointment of an individual who had no foreign intelligence experience, had never been abroad, and spoke no German was typical of the nepotism then prevalent in Beria's NKVD."

While in Berlin, in August 1940, he recruited a Latvian journalist, Orest Berlinks (codenamed by the Soviets "Litseist"), who, in fact, was used by the Germans as a channel of disinformation. The 'intelligence' he supplied included an assurance that Adolf Hitler was focused on defeating the United Kingdom and was restraining generals who wanted to invade the USSR, and that the build up of German troops on the Soviet border was purely defensive. All of this disinformation went directly to Beria, or his successor as the MGB Vsevolod Merkulov, who passed it directly to Stalin, bypassing NKVD intelligence specialists, and reinforcing Stalin's conviction that there was no risk of a German invasion of the USSR in 1941.

== Later career ==
Recalled from Moscow after the German invasion, Kobulov was NKVD chief in Uzbekistan from July 1941 to January 1945. In 1944, as People's Commissar of Internal Affairs of Uzbekistan, he made administrative and logistical arrangements for the reception of the deported Crimean Tatars in Uzbekistan.

In 1945, Kobulov was recalled to Moscow, as deputy head of the NKVD's Main Directorate for Prisoners of War and Internees (GUPVI), and simultaneously he was made deputy head of the NKVD department charged with obtaining intelligence on developing a nuclear bomb. In 1947, the Soviet authorities from a former Gestapo officer that agent 'Liseist' had been a plant, but this discovery had no apparent effect on Kobulov's career. In 1950, he was promoted to head of GUPVI, and from 1951, he was deputy head of Gulag, the department that ran the labour camps.

In May 1953, when Beria was again in control of the police and Ministry of Internal Affairs (MVD), after the death of Stalin, Kobulov was appointed head of the MVD control inspectorate. In this capacity, he visited Berlin twice to enforce Beria's policy of relaxing the dictatorship in East Germany, with a view to reunification. He was there during the uprising of 16-17 June.

== Arrest and death ==
Amayak Kobulov was arrested in Berlin on 27 June 1953 on the same day as his brother, Bogdan, was arrested in Moscow, one day after the arrest of Beria. He was accused, among other crimes, of having caused the collapse of Soviet intelligence in Germany, and of torturing prisoners during the Great Purge. He admitted that he had beaten prisoners, but pleaded that he had done so because while he was based in Ukraine, he received a telegram signed by Stalin ordering him to do so. One man Kobulov beat with a whip committed suicide by jumping from a window. The screams of a woman he was beating were heard throughout NKIVD headquarters in Kyiv.

Kobulov was sentenced to death on October 1, 1954, and shot on February 26, 1955.
