= Ivan Serov =

Soviet intelligence officer (1905–1990)

- Иван Серов
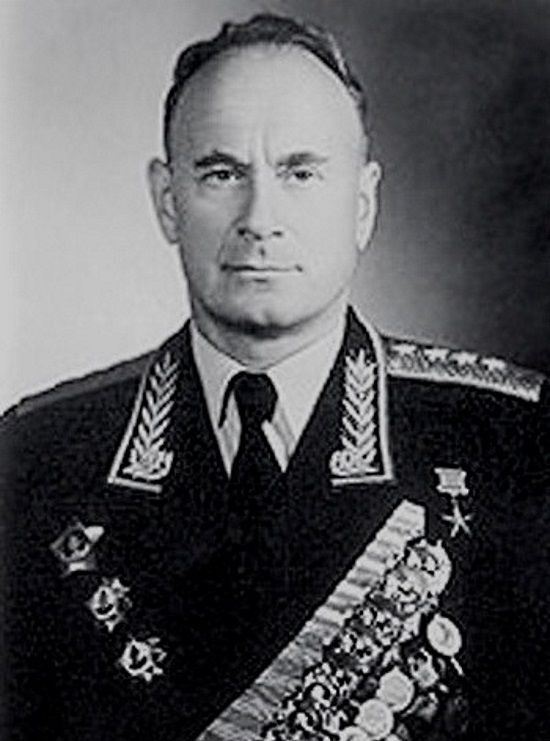

21st head of the Main Intelligence Directorate
- In office 8 December 1958 – 14 March 1963
- Preceded by: Mikhail Shalin
- Succeeded by: Pyotr Ivashutin

1st Chairman of the Committee for State Security (KGB)
- In office 13 March 1954 – 8 December 1958
- Premier: Georgy Malenkov; Nikolai Bulganin; Nikita Khrushchev
- Preceded by: Sergei Kruglov
- Succeeded by: Konstantin Lunev

First Deputy Minister of Internal Affairs of the USSR
- In office February 1947 – March 1954

Deputy People's Commissar/Minister of Internal Affairs of the USSR
- In office July 1941 – February 1947

People's Commissar for Internal Affairs of the Ukrainian SSR
- In office 2 September 1939 – 25 February 1941
- Preceded by: Amayak Kobulov
- Succeeded by: Vasily Sergienko

Head of the Main Directorate of the Workers' and Peasants' Militia of the NKVD of the USSR
- In office February 18 – July 29, 1939
- Preceded by: Vasily Chernyshev
- Succeeded by: Pavel Zuev

Personal details
- Born: Ivan Alexandrovich Serov; Иван Александрович Серов; 13 August 1905 Afimskoye, Kadnikovsky Uyezd, Vologda Governorate, Russian Empire
- Died: 1 July 1990 (aged 84) Krasnogorsk, Moscow Oblast, Russian SFSR, Soviet Union
- Party: Communist Party of the Soviet Union (1926–1965)
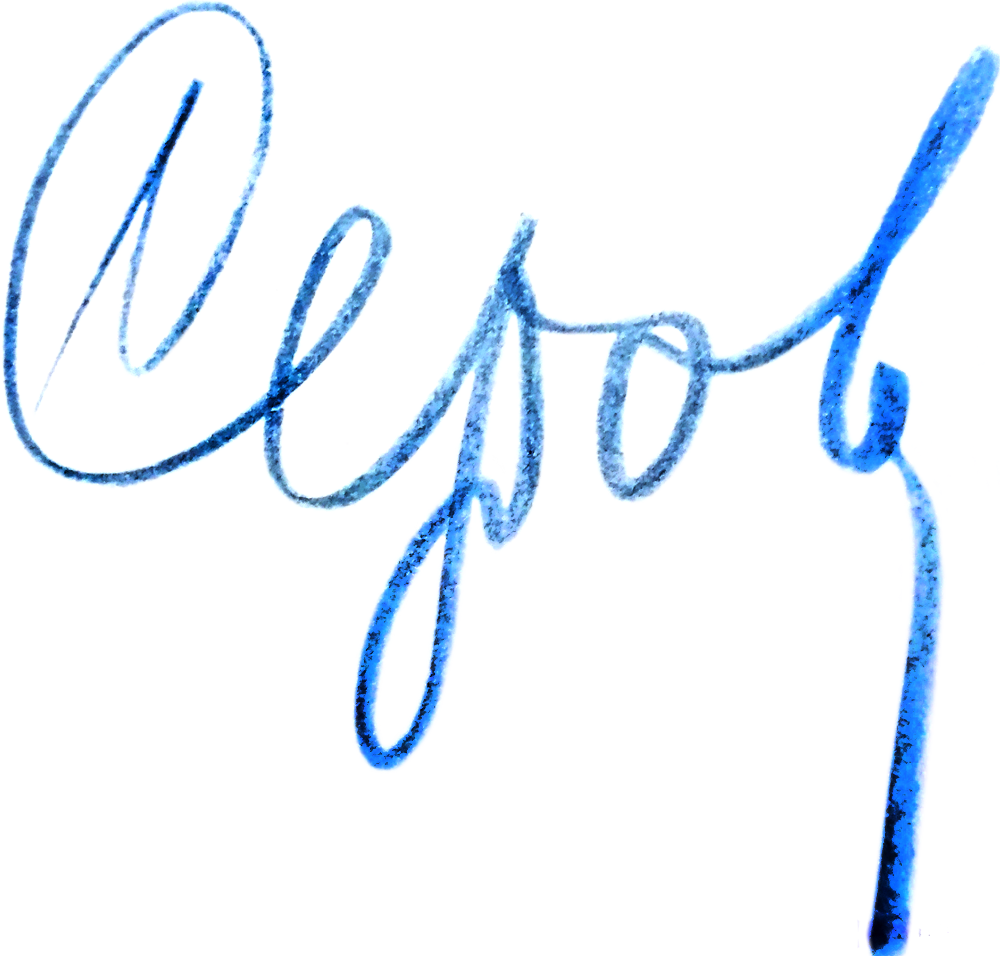
- Signature

Military service
- Allegiance: Soviet Union
- Branch/service: Red Army; NKVD; MGB; MVD; KGB; GRU
- Years of service: 1923–1965
- Rank: Major general
- Battles/wars: World War II; Hungarian Revolution of 1956; Cuban Missile Crisis

Ivan Alexandrovich Serov (Russian: Ива́н Алекса́ндрович Серóв; 13 August 1905 – 1 July 1990) was a Soviet intelligence officer who served as Chairman of the KGB from March 1954 to December 1958 and Director of the GRU from December 1958 to February 1963. Serov was NKVD Commissar of the Ukrainian SSR from 1939 to 1941 and Deputy Commissar of the NKVD under Lavrentiy Beria from 1941 to 1954.

Serov was active in organising NKVD activities against anti-Soviet forces during the Soviet Invasion of Poland and World War II, including the Katyn massacre. Serov issued the Serov Instructions and helped organise the mass deportations of people from Poland, Baltic states and the Caucasus. Serov helped establish secret police forces in the Eastern Bloc after the war and played an important role in suppressing the Hungarian Revolution of 1956. Serov was removed from power in 1963 after his protégé, GRU Colonel Oleg Penkovsky, was exposed as a mole passing classified documents to both British and American intelligence. In retaliation, Serov was stripped of his position, rank, Communist Party membership and Hero of the Soviet Union award in 1965. He lived in obscurity until his death in 1990.

== Early life and military career ==
Ivan Alexandrovich Serov was born on 13 August 1905 in Afimskoe, a village in the Vologda Governorate of the Russian Empire, into a Russian peasant family. In 1923, when he was 18 years old, Serov joined the Red Army shortly after the end of the Russian Civil War. In 1926, he became a member of the All-Union Communist Party (Bolsheviks), and in 1928 graduated from the Artillery Officers' School of Leningrad. A major step in his career as a Red Army officer was his attendance in the mid-1930s of Higher Academic Courses in the prestigious Frunze Military Academy. He married during these years and had two children: a son, Vladimir, who became an engineering officer in the USSR Air Force followed by a daughter, Svetlana.

=== Commissar of Ukraine ===
In 1939, Serov joined the People's Commissariat for Internal Affairs (NKVD), the main security agency and secret police of the Soviet Union. He was appointed to the high-ranking position of NKVD Commissar of the Ukrainian SSR in 1940. As well as performing his duties in this post, Serov was also responsible for the co-ordination of deportation from the Baltic States and Poland. He was one of the top ranked officials responsible for the Katyn massacre of Polish officer POWs.

In 1956, an article in Time magazine accused Serov of being responsible for the death of "hundreds of thousands of Ukrainian peasants" during this period. Serov was also a colleague in Ukraine of Nikita Khrushchev, the local Head of State.

=== Deputy Commissar of the NKVD ===
In 1941, Serov was promoted to Deputy Commissar of the NKVD as a whole, becoming one of the primary lieutenants of NKVD chief Lavrentiy Beria. In this function, Serov was responsible for the mass deportation of a variety of Caucasian peoples, including the deportation of the Chechens. He issued the so-called Serov Instructions, which detailed procedures for mass deportations from the Baltic States, which was for some time confused with the NKVD Order No. 001223 by historians. He also coordinated the mass expulsion of Crimean Tatars from the Crimean ASSR at the end of World War II. Viktor Suvorov claims that in 1946, Serov had oversight of the execution of Andrey Vlasov and the rest of the command of the Russian Liberation Army, an organisation that had co-operated with the Nazis in World War II.

Serov was one of the senior figures in SMERSH, the wartime counterintelligence department of the Red Army, Soviet Navy and NKVD troops, serving as a deputy to Viktor Abakumov. It was in this function that he founded the Ministry of Public Security, the secret police of the Soviet-backed Polish People's Republic until 1956, acting as its main Soviet advisor and organiser. Serov organised the repression of the anti-Soviet Home Army and helped to establish Stalinism in Poland.

In 1945, Serov was transferred to the 2nd Belorussian Front and went to Berlin in May that year. He stayed there until 1947 and helped to organise a security agency that would become the Stasi, the secret police of the German Democratic Republic. Serov was also there to monitor and spy on Marshal Georgy Zhukov (of whom Stalin was personally suspicious) while acting as his political advisor.

== Chairman of the KGB ==
After the death of Joseph Stalin in March 1953, Serov was one of the few senior members of the political police to survive the wave of demotions and forced retirements of Stalinist officials. Serov, who had Beria's trust, betrayed him when he conspired with officers of GRU to avoid his own downfall.

In March 1954, Serov was appointed Chairman of the KGB, making him head of the greater part of the Soviet secret police. Serov organised security for the tours of Nikolai Bulganin and Nikita Khrushchev in the United Kingdom, where he was decried and vilified by the British media as "Ivan the Terrible" and "the Butcher".

Despite the fact that Serov had worked very closely with Beria for years, he sided with Malenkov and Khrushchev against Beria. According to Georgii Zhukov, Serov was directly involved in plot against Beria and organized the arrest of Beria's personal bodyguards, Rafael Sarkisov and Sardeon Nadaraya. Serov was also given responsibility for interrogating Beria, although it was soon transferred to Roman Rudenko instead in order to solve a jurisdictional dispute between the prosecution and NKVD. Afterwards, Serov became the first Chairman of the KGB and was considered a reliable ally of Khrushchev. Serov provided vital support for Khrushchev against the Anti-Party Group in 1957.

=== Hungary ===
Serov played a key role in the suppression of the Hungarian Revolution of 1956 which attempted to overthrow the Soviet-backed Hungarian People's Republic. Serov was active in Hungary, sending reports to the Kremlin from Budapest, and escorting visiting Soviet Presidium leaders Anastas Mikoyan and Mikhail Suslov via an armoured personnel carrier into Budapest on 24 October, as there was too much shooting in the streets. Serov organised the deportation of Hungarian revolutionaries, including Nagy, and also tried stopping The Workers' Council of Budapest from negotiating for the return of deportees and political rights, using Soviet troops to prevent the council from meeting in the city's Sports Hall. Serov co-ordinated the abduction of Pál Maléter and the disruption of peace talks between the Red Army and the Hungarian forces.

== Director of the GRU ==
In December 1958, Serov was removed from his post as Chairman of the KGB after hints by Khrushchev, who had said that Western visitors could expect that they "wouldn't see so many policemen around the place" and that the Soviet police force would undergo a restructuring. Serov was instead appointed as the Director of the GRU, with the official reason being a need to strengthen the agency's leadership. Serov was active in the Cuban Missile Crisis, helping the Soviet leadership with American intelligence.

== Removal from power ==
In February 1963, Serov was dismissed as Director of the GRU when it was discovered that Oleg Penkovsky, a GRU colonel and his protégé, was a double agent spying for the British. The affair was an embarrassment and irreparably damaged his reputation. Khrushchev, feeling he could no longer trust Serov, had him appointed to an unimportant position as assistant to the commander of the Turkestan Military District. A month later, he was demoted to major general. In August, he was transferred to the Volga Military District. In November 1964, Serov wrote a letter to the Politburo expressing his dismay at his treatment in the aftermath of the Penkovsky affair. In April 1965, he was stripped of his party membership and dismissed. Serov spent the rest of his life unsuccessfully seeking rehabilitation in the eyes of the public, restoration of his party membership, and the return of his rank of general and Hero of the Soviet Union to him.

== Death ==
Serov died in 1990 at the Central Military Clinical Hospital in Krasnogorsk. He was buried at the cemetery in the village of Ilyinskoye in Krasnogorsky District, Moscow Oblast.

== Awards and decorations ==
Soviet Union

~~Hero of the Soviet Union (29 May 1945)~~ (deprived on 12 March 1963)
Order of Lenin, seven times (26 April 1940, 13 December 1942, ~~29 May 1945~~, 30 January 1951, 19 September 1952, 25 August 1955) (third award deprived on 12 March 1963)
Order of the Red Banner, five times (20 September 1943, 7 July 1944, 3 November 1944, 5 November 1954, 31 December 1955)
~~Order of Suvorov, 1st class (8 March 1944)~~ (deprived on 6 April 1962)
Order of Kutuzov, 1st class, twice (24 April 1945, 18 December 1956)
Order of the Patriotic War, 1st class (11 March 1985)
Medal "For the Defence of Stalingrad" (22 December 1942)
Medal "For the Defence of Moscow" (1 May 1944)
Medal "For the Defence of Leningrad" (22 December 1942)
Medal "For the Defence of the Caucasus" (1 May 1944)
Medal "For the Liberation of Warsaw" (9 June 1945)
Medal "For the Capture of Berlin" (9 June 1945)
Medal "For the Victory over Germany in the Great Patriotic War 1941–1945" (9 May 1945)

- jubilee medals

Foreign

Patriotic Order of Merit in gold (East Germany)
~~Gold's Cross of the Virtuti Militari (Poland)~~
Order of the Cross of Grunwald, 2nd class (Poland)
Medal "For Oder, Neisse and the Baltic" (Poland)
Medal "For Warsaw 1939-1945" (Poland)

Serov's award of the Gold's Cross of the Virtuti Militari was posthumously deprived in 1995 by the decision of the President of Poland Lech Wałęsa.

== Personality ==
In MI5 files about Serov, British agents who had met him called him "something of a ladies' man," good mannered, carefully dressed and a moderate drinker. He displayed a considerable familiarity with detective fiction such as Sherlock Holmes. His sense of humour was somewhat heavy, and his jokes were broadly sarcastic and, on occasion, strongly anti-Semitic.

According to historian Asif Azam Siddiqi, Serov was "almost as feared as his boss, Lavrentii Beria" and was known for his "historic disdain for non-Russians." He was labelled by British media as a "Russian version of Himmler".

In the MI5 reports, Serov was described as "a capable organiser with a cunning mind". Dmitri Shepilov, who briefly served as the Soviet Minister of Foreign Affairs between June 1956 and February 1957, described Serov as "an utterly amoral and ignorant figure, directly and personally involved in many of the security agencies’ past crimes". Shepilov noted Serov's strong loyalty to Khrushchev, stating that Serov "was ready with a serf’s zealousness to carry out any of his [Khrushchev’s] lawless instructions and personal whims".

== Significance ==
Serov, although generally considered less significant than Beria in modern literature, helped to bring Stalinism to Europe and to Stalinise the Soviet Union. Serov's consolidation of Soviet power in Eastern Europe was helped by his organisation of both the Urząd Bezpieczeństwa (Polish Intelligence Service) in Poland and the Stasi in East Germany.

== Cultural references ==
Serov makes a brief appearance at the beginning of Ian Fleming's 1957 James Bond novel From Russia, With Love. Fleming writes that he "was in every respect a bigger man than Beria" and that "he, with Bulganin and Khrushchev, now ruled Russia. One day, he might even stand on the peak, alone." Although his appearance was written out of the film adaptation of the same name, Serov would later coincidentally be portrayed by Die Another Day cast member Mikhail Gorevoy in the 2006 BBC docudrama series Space Race.

Serov also briefly features in the 1950s novel Berlin by the German anti-Nazi writer Theodor Plievier, who lived in the USSR throughout the Hitler years. Plievier says Serov was nicknamed chramoi (which he translates as "Old Cripple Foot", Russian: хромой, IPA: [xrɐˈmoj], 'lame', 'limping'), a reference to a supposed deformity (presumably a club foot).

== Sources ==
- Nikita Petrov, "The First Chairman of the KGB: Ivan Serov" (Pervy predsedatel KGB : Ivan Serov), Moscow: Materik (2005) ISBN 5-85646-129-0
- Johanna Granville, The First Domino: International Decision Making During the Hungarian Crisis of 1956, Texas A & M University Press, 2004. ISBN 1-58544-298-4
- Viktor Suvorov, "Inside Soviet Military Intelligence" (1984), ISBN 0-02-615510-9

Government offices
Preceded by Sergei Kruglov as Minister of State Security	Chairman of the Committee for State Security; 1954–1958	Succeeded by Aleksandr Shelepin
Preceded by Amayak Kobulov	People's Commissariat of Internal Affairs of Ukraine; 1939–1941	Succeeded by Vasyl Serhiyenko
