= Arracourt =

- Commune
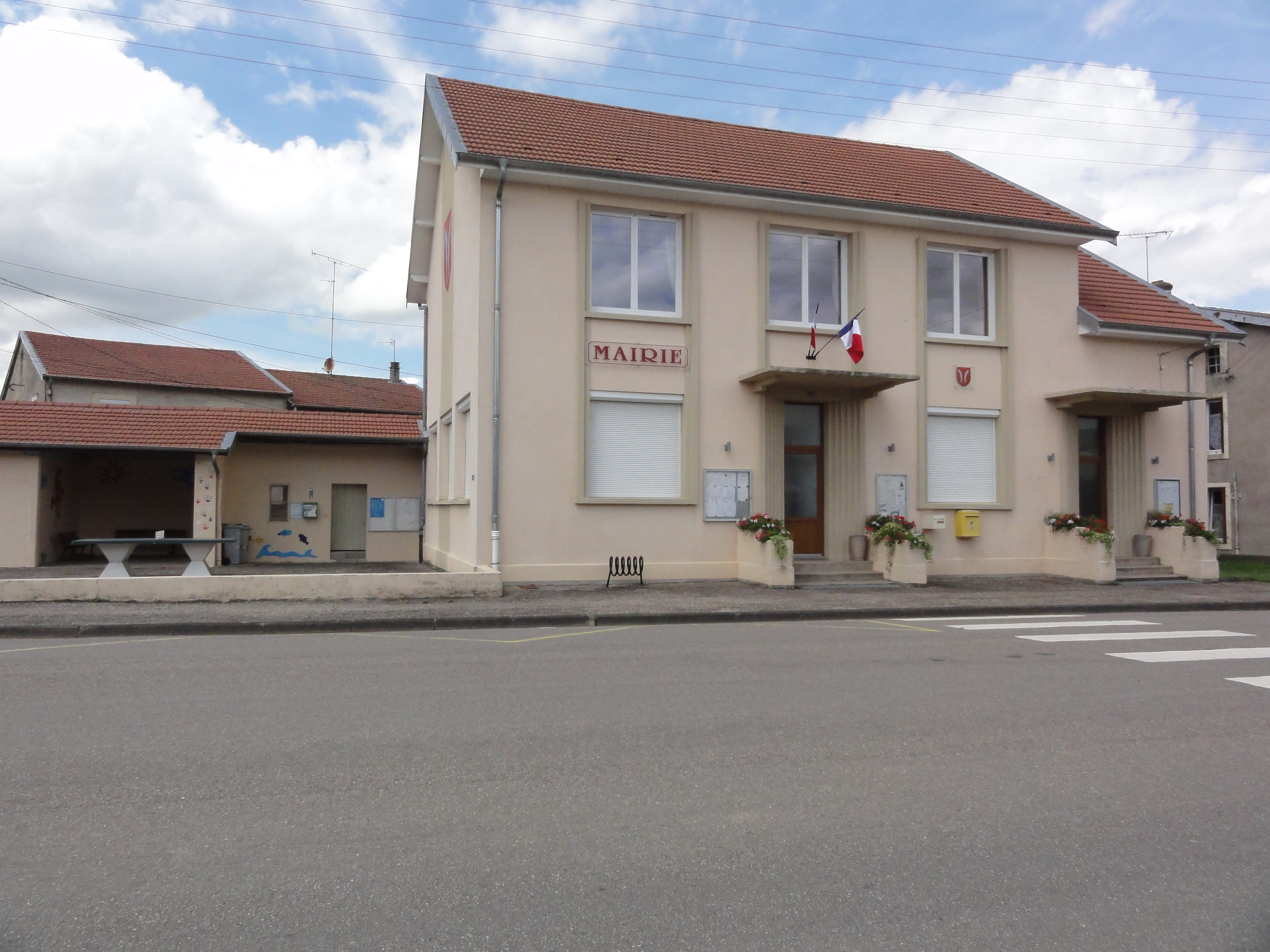
- The town hall in Arracourt

- Coat of arms
- Location of Arracourt
- Location within France Location within Grand Est
- Coordinates: 48°43′28″N 6°32′02″E
- Country: France
- Region: Grand Est
- Department: Meurthe-et-Moselle
- Arrondissement: Lunéville
- Canton: Baccarat
- Intercommunality: CC Pays Sânon

Government
  - Mayor (2020–2026): Michèle Kirsch
- Area^{1}: 17.41 km^{2} (6.72 sq mi)
- Elevation: 228 m (748 ft)
- Highest elevation: 335 m (1,099 ft)
- Lowest elevation: 215 m (705 ft)
- Population (2023): 254
  - Density: 14.6/km^{2} (37.8/sq mi)
- Time zone: UTC+01:00 (CET)
  - Summer (DST): UTC+02:00 (CEST)
- INSEE/Postal code: 54023 /54370
- ^{1} French Land Register data, which excludes lakes, ponds, glaciers > 1 km^{2} (0.386 sq mi or 247 acres) and river estuaries.

Arracourt (French pronunciation: [aʁakuʁ]) is a commune in the Meurthe-et-Moselle department in northeastern France.

== History ==
The battle of Arracourt was a World War II clash of U.S. and German armored forces near Arracourt during September 18–29, 1944.

== Population ==
Historical population
Year	Pop.	±% p.a.
1968	321	—
1975	259	−3.02%
1982	215	−2.62%
1990	259	+2.35%
1999	234	−1.12%
2007	241	+0.37%
2012	244	+0.25%
2017	246	+0.16%
2023	254	+0.53%
Source: INSEE

== See also ==
- Communes of the Meurthe-et-Moselle department
