= 102nd Panzer Brigade =

- Active: 15 August - 27 November 1944
- Country: Nazi Germany
- Branch: Army
- Type: Panzer
- Role: Armoured warfare
- Size: Brigade
- Engagements: World War II: Eastern Front; Gumbinnen Operation

The 102nd Panzer Brigade was a Panzer Brigade that fought in World War II.

== History ==
Ordered to be formed on 20 July 1944, it was not formed until 15 August 1944. The brigade was deployed on the Eastern Front and was involved in the Battle of Gumbinnen. The brigade was disbanded on 27 November 1944 and absorbed to the 7th Panzer Division.

== Order of battle ==
- 2102nd Panzer Battalion (4 Panther companies)
- 2102nd Panzergrenadier Battalion (3 half track companies)
- 2102nd Brigade Support Units
- 2102nd Pioneer Company

== Commanders ==
- Major Curt Ehle
