= 101st Panzer Brigade =

- Active: 5 July – 21 September 1941; 15 August - October 1944
- Country: Nazi Germany
- Branch: Army
- Type: Panzer
- Role: Armoured warfare
- Size: Brigade
- Engagements: World War II: Eastern Front; Operation Doppelkopf

Commanders
- Notable commanders: Oberst Meinrad von Lauchert

The 101st Panzer Brigade was a Panzer Brigade that fought in World War II.

== History ==
The first 101st Panzer Brigade was formed on 5 July 1941 in France with captured tanks. On 21 September 1941, it was used to form the staff of the 23rd Panzer Division. Colonel Botho Elster was briefly in command of the brigade in 1941 before being transferred to OB West.

The second 101st Panzer Brigade was ordered to be formed on 11 July 1944 but was not formed until 15 August 1944. Like most Panzer Brigades, it had a battalion of Panther tanks and a battalion of panzergrenadiers in Sd.Kfz. 251 half tracks. It was a part of the ad hoc Panzerverband Strachwitz under Hyacinth Graf Strachwitz von Groß-Zauche und Camminetz. The 101st, along with the SS Panzer Brigade Gross, participated in Operation Doppelkopf to restore connection between Army Group North and Army Group Center. It was then deployed to the frontline on Estonia. In October 1944, the brigade was reformed near Bobruisk, then it was merged with the remains of the destroyed 20th Panzer Division. The brigade staff formed the Staff/21st Panzer Regiment, the panzer battalion became the 2/21st Panzer Regiment, while the panzergrenadier Battalion became a Jagd-Kommando in the 20th Panzer Division.

== Order of battle ==
=== 1941 ===
- 203rd Panzer Regiment
- 204th Panzer Regiment

=== 1944 ===
- 2101st Panzer Battalion (3 Panther tank companies, 1 Jagdpanzer IV company)
- 2101st Panzergrenadier Battalion (3 companies)
- 2101st Brigade Support Units

== Commanders ==
- Oberst Botho Elster - 1941
- Oberst Meinrad von Lauchert - July - August 1944
- Oberst Richard Schmidthagen - August 1944
- Oberstleutnant Guido von Wartenburg - August - September 1944
- Major Eberhard Zahn - September - October 1944 (Note: Major Friedrich-Wilhelm Breidenbach also served as acting commander, date of command is unknown.)
