= Serov Instructions =

Soviet document on 1941 Baltic deportations

The so-called Serov Instructions (full title: On the Procedure for Carrying out the Deportation of Anti-Soviet Elements from Lithuania, Latvia, and Estonia) was an undated top secret document, signed by General Ivan Serov, Deputy People's Commissar for State Security of the Soviet Union (NKGB). The instructions detailed procedures on how to carry out the mass deportations to Siberia of June 13–14, 1941, which occurred throughout Lithuania, Latvia and Estonia during the first (1940-1941) Soviet occupation of the three Baltic countries.

The instructions specified that the deportations would be carried out as secretly, quietly and speedily as possible. Families were restricted to taking 100 kilograms (220 lb) of their belongings (clothes, food, kitchenware). The heads of the families were sent to Gulag labor camps, and other members were transported to forced settlements in remote areas of the Soviet Union.

== Dating and confusion ==
While the original document is undated, sources provide various dates from October 11, 1939 to January 21, 1941. However, the NKGB was created only on February 3, 1941 and so could not have issued documents earlier.

A copy of the instructions, found in Šiauliai, had a stamp that the document was received on June 7. Therefore, the instructions must have been written sometime between February and June 1941.

The Serov Instructions are often confused with NKVD Order No. 001223, a completely different document that was signed by Lavrenty Beria on October 11, 1939, which was prepared by the People's Commissariat for Internal Affairs (NKVD) and listed various groups of people (anticommunists, former military or police personnel, large landowners, industrialists etc.) to be targeted by Soviet security structures according to the Article 58 (RSFSR Penal Code). The original Serov Instructions had no date or number. The confusion possibly originates from the Third Interim Report by the United States House Select Committee to Investigate the Incorporation of the Baltic States into the U.S.S.R., which published the full text of the Instructions under a misleading heading as Order № 001223.

== See also ==
- Population transfer in the Soviet Union
