= NKVD Order No. 001223 =

1939 order by Lavrentiy Beria

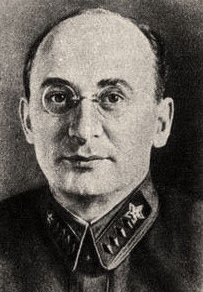
Lavrentiy Pavlovich Beria, (1899-1953)

The NKVD Order No. 001223, also known as Об оперативных мерах против антисоветских и социально враждебных элементов, erroneously: О высылке антисоветских элементов из Литвы, Латвии и Эстонии, was an order signed by Lavrentiy Beria on October 11, 1939. In fact, its title was "О введении единой системы оперативного учета антисоветских элементов, выявляемых агентурной разработкой", or translated as, e.g."On the Operative Accounting of Anti-Soviet and Socially Alien Elements"

For a long time, the text of the order and its exact title were not available, and information about it is known from references, including its date and number, in the subsequent orders of state security.

Therefore, it used to be confused with the so-called Serov Instructions of 1941. The confusion was noted, for example, by Finnish historian Seppo Myllyniemi in 1979.

In 2012, Russian historian Aleksandr Dyukov, in his collection of documents, Накануне Холокоста. Фронт литовских активистов и советские репрессии в Литве, 1940 - 1941 гг. published the text of the Order No. 001223 with a large collections of other documents of the time. In the introduction, basing on the reading of the documents, Dyukov argued that the deportations were actually an indirect result of the sloppy work of NKVD, which could not counteract the Baltic anti-Soviet underground by routine everyday work. Order 001223 was about the compilation of the list of anti-Soviet activists. Attached to the Order was a detailed bureaucratic instruction how to carry out the accounting, signed by Chief of the 1st Special Department of the NKVD of the USSR, captain of state security Petrov. (Начальник 1 Спецотдела НКВД СССР, Капитан государственной безопасности ПЕТРОВ).
