= SS Panzer Brigade Gross =

- Active: August – November 1944
- Country: Nazi Germany
- Branch: Waffen SS
- Type: Panzer
- Role: Armoured warfare
- Size: Brigade
- Engagements: Operation Doppelkopf

Commanders
- Notable commanders: Martin Gross

SS Panzer Brigade Gross was a unit of the Waffen-SS of Nazi Germany during World War II, under the command of Obersturmbannführer Martin Gross. The brigade was formed from the SS Panzer Training and Replacement Regiment based in Dundaga, Latvia and the SS Panzer Troop Training Regiment Seelager based at the training grounds at Ventspils together with the SS Reconnaissance Training Battalion in August 1944. The brigade consisted of two infantry battalions, a panzer battalion of two companies with Panzer III and Panzer IV, a reconnaissance battalion, a StuG battalion, a pioneer company and a Flak company.

The brigade participated in the fighting in Courland and Riga in August and September before it was transferred west to training grounds in Sennelager and Steinhagen in November where it was broken up for replacements. It was not formally disbanded until April 1945.

== Bibliography ==
- Mitchum, Samuel. German Order of Battle, Volume 3, Stackpole Books, 2007, ISBN 0-8117-3438-2
- Munoz, Antonio J. Forgotten Legions: Obscure Combat Formations of the Waffen-SS, Axis Europa Books, 1991, ISBN 0-7394-0817-8
- Tessin, Georg. Verbände und Truppen der deutschen Wehrmacht und Waffen-SS im Zweiten Weltkrieg 1939–1945; Band 14: Die Landstreitkräfte: Namensverbände/ Die Luftstreitkräfte (Fliegende Verbände)/ Flakeinsatz im Reich 1943–1945. Osnabruck: Biblio, 1980 ISBN 3-7648-1111-0
