= Sturmgeschütz =

Series of armored fighting vehicles

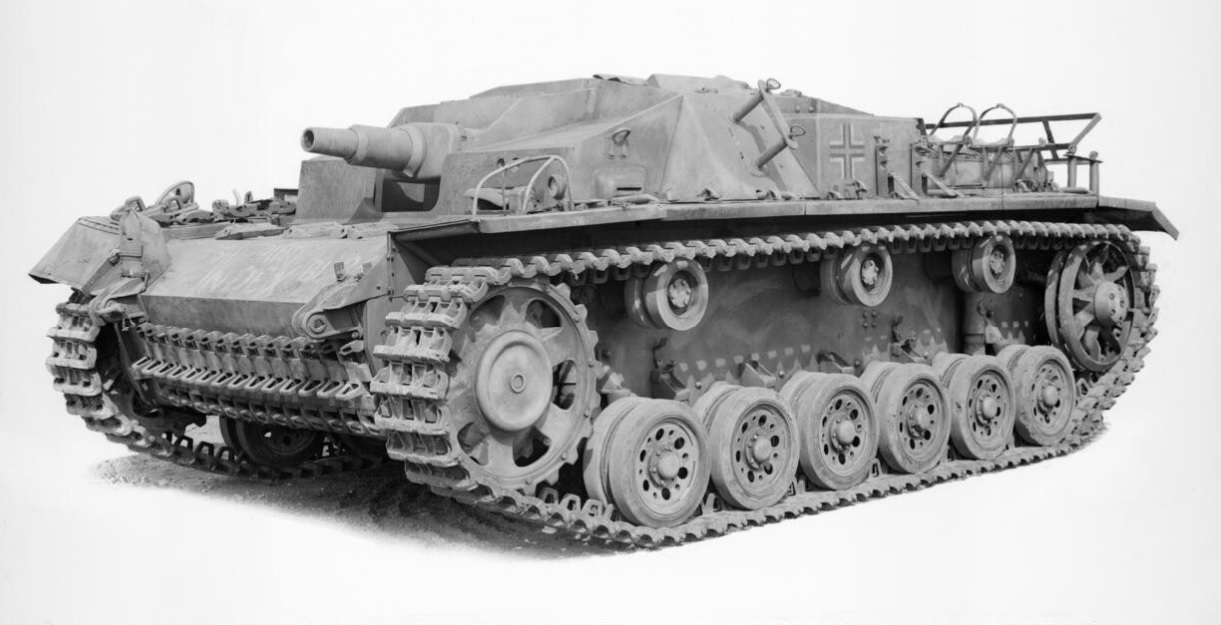
An early version of the Sturmgeschütz (StuG III Ausf.C/D)

Sturmgeschütz (abbreviated StuG) meaning "assault gun" was a series of armored fighting vehicles used by both German Wehrmacht and Waffen-SS formations during the Second World War (1939–1945). The main StuGs were the StuG III and StuG IV based on the Panzer III and Panzer IV medium tank chassis respectively.

The more common of the two, the StuG III was developed in the late 1930s on the chassis of the Panzer III. It was initially designated "StuG" but with the development in 1943 of the StuG IV to make up for lost StuG III production, it was re-designated as "StuG III" to distinguish the two. Initially, the Wehrmacht intended to use StuGs as armored self-propelled infantry support guns, providing close fire-support to infantry by destroying bunkers, pillboxes and other entrenched positions. A secondary capability as an anti-tank weapon became more important as the war progressed.

Following the Axis invasion of the Soviet Union in 1941, a significant problem emerged: the main armament on the light tanks and the 37 mm gun of the anti-tank guns and the Panzer III were insufficient against the newer Soviet T-34 medium and KV-1 heavy tanks. A more powerful gun, the 7.5 cm Pak 40, then in development, did not fit in the turret of the Panzer III, Germany's primary medium tank at the time. The Wehrmacht found, however, that the turretless StuGs had enough room in the crew compartment to mount the 75 mm Pak 40, and modified StuGs duly appeared. The new model proved an effective tank destroyer. Not only was its main gun powerful enough to knock out the new Soviet tanks, but the Panzer III chassis on which it was based made it highly mobile and reliable, and the increased armor plating combined with its low silhouette made it a difficult vehicle to destroy. The StuG III became Nazi Germany's most-produced armored fighting-vehicle during World War II, with some 10,000 examples manufactured.

The StuG vehicles operated primarily within the Sturmartillerie ("self-propelled artillery"), a branch of the artillery arm of the German armed forces.

== Development history ==
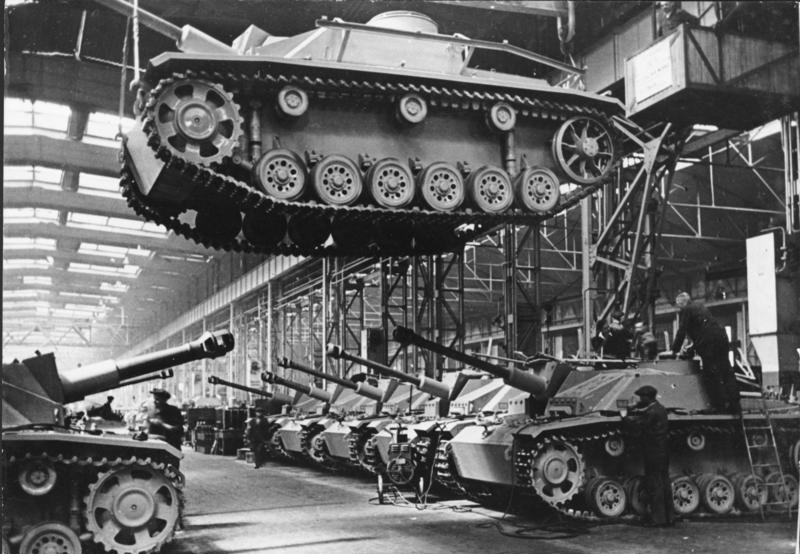
Alkett production plant

Following the defeat of the German Empire in World War I, military commanders from the Reichswehr began to consider how mobile armored artillery units could provide support to advancing infantry units. Colonel Erich von Manstein recommended the concept of infantry Begleitbatterien (escort batteries) to General Beck, chief of the general staff in 1935. Manstein theorized the vehicle would not be used as one uses a tank, but rather as an infantry support vehicle to destroy fortified objectives through direct fire. Its mission was to destroy prepared defensive works, pill boxes, machine gun emplacements and tanks. It was not intended to be used to exploit breakthroughs and drive into the enemy rear areas, as the Panzertruppen units were intended to do.

=== StuG III ===
Daimler-Benz AG was given the order to develop and produce such a weapon on June 15, 1936. They created five prototypes, based on the chassis of the Panzer III, which were not useful for combat operations but did prove valuable for training.

The first production units, the Sturmgeschütz III Ausf A, arrived in 1940 mounted with the short barreled 75 mm StuK 37L/24 gun and increased frontal hull armor (from 30 mm to 50 mm). The main armament, which had a limited lateral traverse, was mounted directly in a casemate-style hull. This created the lowest possible profile in order to reduce the vehicle's height, making the StuG more difficult to hit and easier to protect in hull defilade.

== Combat use ==
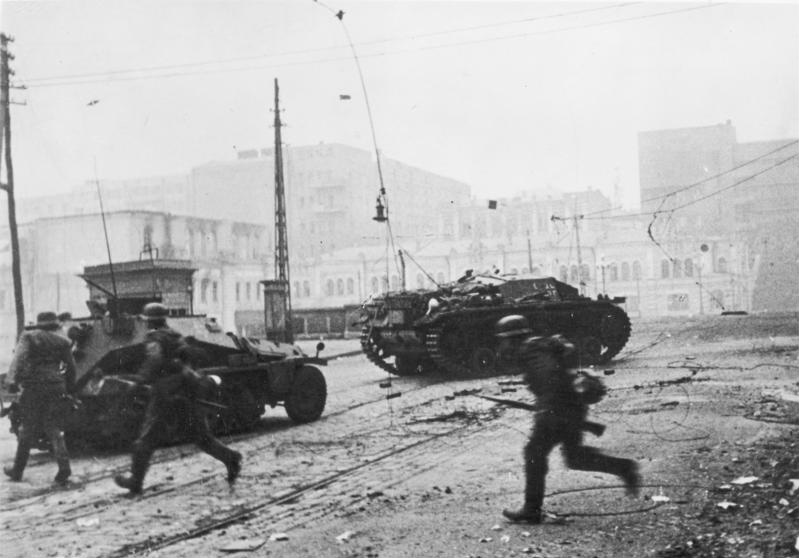
A StuG in action during the First Battle of Kharkov, Oct 1941

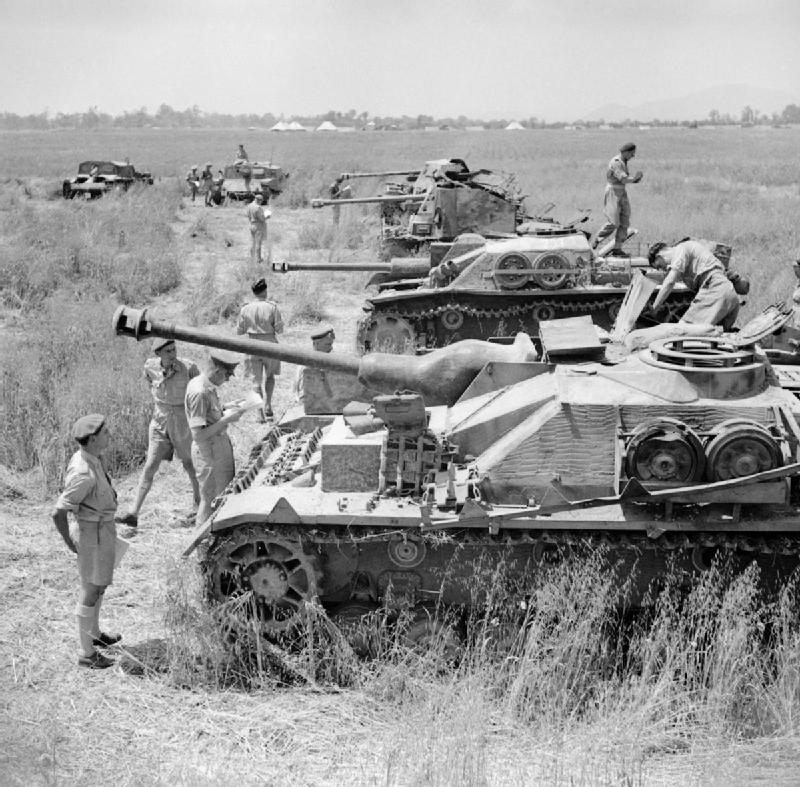
British troops inspect captured German equipment, including a StuG IV and a StuG III

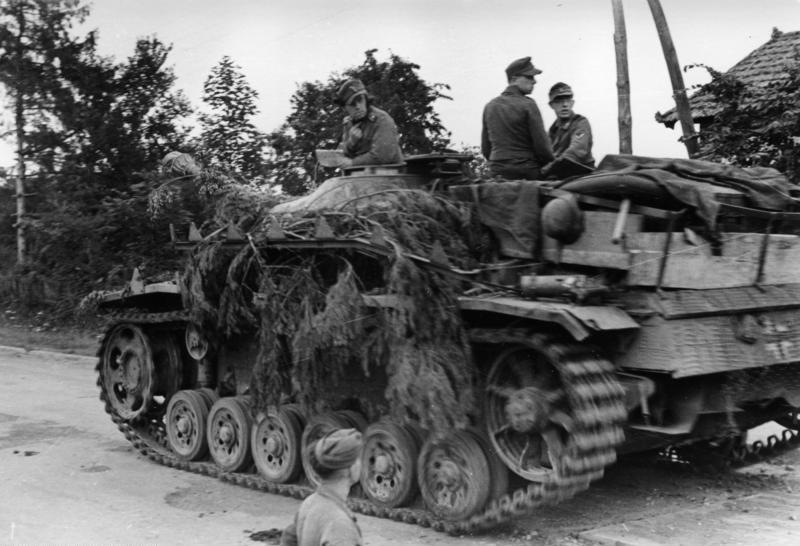
A StuG III in Normandy

In 1942 and 1943 the StuG was one of the most effective tracked fighting vehicles fielded by the belligerents, in terms of enemy vehicles destroyed. Over 10,000 StuGs were eventually produced.

The omission of a regular tank turret made for simpler and more cost-effective production, enabling greater numbers to be built. However, the lack of a traverse movement in the gun meant the entire vehicle had to be turned left or right to acquire targets, which proved to be a significant weakness at times. The StuG was more successful in defensive roles, such as ambush, rather than as an offensive vehicle.

The lack of an internal light machine gun in early models left the StuG vulnerable to close-range infantry attack. A machine gun and shield were added to later versions.

=== StuG IV ===
In November 1943, Alkett, GmbH, a major StuG III manufacturer, was bombed as part of the RAF campaign against Berlin, and Alkett's StuG production declined from 255 StuG IIIs in October 1943, to just 24 vehicles in December. In a December 1943 conference, Hitler welcomed the suggestion of taking the StuG III superstructure and mounting it on a Panzer IV chassis to offset the loss of production of the StuG III. This restarted the Sturmgeschütz IV project, which had earlier been considered and rejected. The superstructure of the StuG III Ausf. G was mounted on a Panzer IV chassis 7. The Krupp plant, which did not produce Panzer IIIs, used the Panzer IV chassis with a modified StuG III superstructure, with a box compartment for the driver added. Combat weight was 23 tonnes, lighter than the 23.9 tonnes for the StuG III Ausf. G. On December 16–17, 1943, Hitler was shown the StuG IV, and approved it. To make up for the large deficit in StuG III production, StuG IV production received full support.

=== Broadened use ===
Because of the decreased costs and ease of production, the Germans began to use the StuGs to replace standard tank losses. They were used in this fashion as German losses of all types of armored vehicles now exceeded production. The StuGs proved effective in a defensive role, but were a poor substitute for conventional tanks offensively. Thus the panzer regiments continued to be equipped with Panzer IV and Panther medium tanks for offensive operations. Meanwhile, heavier armed tank destroyers were developed, such as the Jagdpanzer IV and the Jagdpanther, which combined the low silhouette of the StuG with the heavier armament of the Panther and Tiger II tanks, respectively. Still, the StuG III was an effective armored fighting vehicle long after the Panzer III had been retired as a medium tank

=== Post-war use ===
A number of captured StuGs were refurbished in the Soviet Union and given to Syria, along with some Panzer IVs, where they were used briefly against Israel. A captured Syrian Panzer IV and StuG III are on display at the Armor Museum in Israel. The StuG was also used in Finland post-war where one unit even mixed StuGs and British turreted 'Charioteer' tank destroyers. A Finnish StuG (posing as a German one) appears in the movie The Eagle Has Landed, and ex-Finnish StuGs have since turned up in British war museums. The Bovington Tank Museum in Dorset has one painted in Finnish markings. The Imperial War Museum's Duxford site also has an ex-Finland StuG but its markings are more ambiguous. The American Heritage Museum in Stow, Massachusetts, has a StuG III Ausf. G displayed.

Another StuG III, in the possession of The Wheatcroft Collection, is awaiting restoration.

== See also ==
- Samokhodnaya Ustanovka, generic Russian term for their similar-design assault guns and tank destroyers.
