= Timeline of the war in Donbas (2022) =

- 2014; 2015; 2016; 2017; 2018; 2019; 2020; 2021; 2022

This is a timeline of the war in Donbas in early 2022. On 24 February 2022, the war in Donbas was subsumed into the eastern front of the full-scale Russian invasion of Ukraine.

== January ==
- 1 January: The law "On the foundations of national resistance" came into force in Ukraine. It established a number of measures dealing with civilian mobilization and resistance in the case of external aggression. The leading role of the movement would be carried out by the commander of the Special Operations Forces. A Ukrainian soldier, injured on 27 December 2021, died of wounds at a military hospital in Kharkiv.
- 8 January: The Ukrainian Joint Forces press center reported six pro-Russian violations of the ceasefire, one of them an unauthorized drone flight over Ukrainian positions. One Ukrainian soldier was wounded in action. In the eastern area of operations, Pisky became the target of 73 mm anti-tank recoilless rifles and 82 mm mortars. Novomykhailivka was hit by heavy machine gun fire, automatic grenade launchers and 82 mm mortars. Ukrainian troops at Bohdanivka were harassed with small arms fire. In the northern front, Ukrainian redoubts at Stanytsia Luhanska were hit by VOG-17 grenades fired from a pro-Russian drone. Small arms fire was reported at Krymske.
- 10 January: The Ukrainian Joint Forces press center recorded two pro-Russian attacks on their positions, both of them in the area of Pisky, in the eastern front. Two Ukrainian servicemen died after the explosion of landmines while on a mission within the buffer zone. Pisky received fire from small arms, heavy machine guns and 73 mm anti-tank recoilless rifles.
- 11 January: One Ukrainian soldier was killed while fighting pro-Russian forces. A single pro-Russian attack on Ukrainian troops was reported by the press center of the Ukrainian Joint Forces, when Ukrainian redoubts at Novotoshkivke, in the northern area of operations, were hit by small arms and heavy machine gun fire.
- 12 January: The press center of the Ukrainian Joint Forces recorded three pro-Russian violations of the truce; one Ukrainian soldier was wounded in action. In the eastern area of operations, Prychepylivka became the target of anti-tank rocket launchers and 73 mm anti-tank recoilless rifles on two occasions. In the northern front, 120 mm mortar volleys landed in Novozvanivka.
- 22 January: The Ukrainian Joint Forces press center reported four pro-Russian violations of the ceasefire, all of them in the eastern area of operations. One Ukrainian soldier was wounded in action. The village of Maisk was shelled twice with automatic grenade launchers. Vodiane became the target of anti-tank rocket launchers and 82 mm mortars; later in the day, a pro-Russian drone launched a strike on Ukrainian positions by firing a VOG-17 rocket.
- 23 January: According to the press center of the Ukrainian Joint Forces, pro-Russian forces launched ten attacks on their positions along the demarcation line. One Ukrainian soldier was wounded in action. In the eastern area of operations, the stronghold of Vodiane was hit by the combined fire of 82 mm and 120 mm mortars, as well as different types of grenades and rockets. In Prichepilivka, Ukrainian positions were pounded by heavy machine gun fire and anti-tank rockets. On the northern front, Novozvanivka was hit by a 122 mm artillery barrage, while Ukrainian redoubts at Popasna became the target of heavy machine guns, automatic grenade launchers and 120 mm mortars. Ukrainian troops at Katerinivka were harassed with small arms fire and different types of grenades and rockets.
- 25 January: The press center of the Ukrainian Joint Forces recorded five pro-Russian violations of the truce; two Ukrainian soldiers was wounded in action, one of them seriously. Ukrainian forces returned fire. All the incidents took place in the eastern area of operations. Ukrainian redoubts at Pyshchevik were hit by a drone strike with VOG-17 rockets. Avdiivka received fire from heavy machine guns and 73 mm anti-tank recoilless rifles. Marinka was hit by small arms fire and antitank rockets, while Ukrainian troops at Shyrokyne were harassed with small arms and heavy machine gun fire.
- 27 January: The Ukrainian Joint Forces press center reported two pro-Russian violations of the ceasefire. In the eastern area of operations, Ukrainian troops at Marinka were harassed with small arms fire. In the northern front, Ukrainian forces fend off a pro-Russian attempt to infiltrate a special forces group through the demarcation line.

== February ==
- 2 February: The press center of the Ukrainian Joint Forces recorded four pro-Russian violations of the truce; a Ukrainian soldier was wounded in action. The incidents took place in the eastern area of operations. A Ukrainian checkpoint at Hnutove was the subject of a drone strike; a VOG-17 grenade exploded beside the outpost. Ukrainian positions at Vodiane came under fire from heavy machine guns, anti-tank rocket launchers and 82 mm mortars. Talakivka was shelled with automatic grenade launchers and anti-tank rocket launchers, while Vodiane was hit by anti-tank rockets.
- 5 February: The Ukrainian Joint Forces press center reported six pro-Russian violations of the ceasefire; two Ukrainian soldiers were wounded. All the incidents occurred in the eastern area of operations. Pro-Russian forces launched an attack with two drones on the Ukrainian stronghold of Pavlopil; the unmanned aircraft fired four VOG-17 grenades at downtown, hitting a school building. Ukrainian troops at Pyshchevyk received fire from anti-tank rocket launchers, automatic grenade launchers and small arms. The village of Berezove was attacked with automatic grenade launchers and small arms; small arms fire was also reported at Pisky. Pro-Russian sources from Donetsk denounced six Ukrainian attacks on their military positions. Ukrainian forces fired different grenade-launcher systems and 120 mm mortars at Novoshyrokivske and Sosnovskoye, in the region of Mariupol, and, in the outskirts of Donetsk city, at Spartak and Donetsk itself. A garage and several civilian vehicles were damaged.
- 8 February: According to the press center of the Ukrainian Joint Forces, pro-Russian forces launched three attacks on their positions along the demarcation line, two of them in the eastern area of operations. Nevelske became the target of a drone strike; the uncrewed aircraft dropped a VOG-17 grenade on Ukrainian positions. Pisky was hit by anti-tank rockets. In the northern front, Ukrainian troops at Svitlodarsk received fire from small arms and anti-tank rocket launchers.
- 10 February: The Ukrainian Joint Forces press center reported eight pro-Russian violations of the ceasefire. In the eastern area of operations, Taramchuk was hit by three VOG-17 grenades fired by a pro-Russian drone. Pisky, meanwhile, became the target of different grenade-launcher systems. Ukrainian troops at Hranitne were harassed with heavy machine guns, and small arms fire was reported at nearby Vodiane. In the northern front, Zaitseve received fire from infantry weapons, automatic grenade launchers and anti-tank rocket launchers. Positions at Popasna were hit by small arms and heavy machine gun fire.
- 13 February: OSCE started evacuating its staff from Donetsk city.
- 15 February: In Moscow, the State Duma approved a motion to ask President Vladimir Putin the recognition of the independence of the separatist republics in Ukraine, with 351 positive votes, 16 negatives and one abstention. According to the press center of the Ukrainian Joint Forces, pro-Russian forces launched four attacks on their positions along the demarcation line, all of them in the northern front. The village of Katerynivka was hit by anti-tank guided missiles. Orikhove was shelled with anti-tank rocket launchers and 120 mm mortars; Stanytsia Luhanska received fire from 82 mm mortars. Lobacheve became the target of anti-tank rockets. Pro-Russian forces returned fire using artillery.
- 16 February: The main federal investigation agency of Russia, the Investigative Committee of the Russian Federation, claimed to have seen evidence that "'thousands of Russian-speaking civilians' had been killed by Ukrainian forces in the Donbas region". They accused the Ukrainian military of "using lethal weapons of indiscriminate action designed to eliminate people and infrastructure as effectively as possible." Experts said that the claims were propaganda "to justify [Russia's] increasing military build-up on the Ukraine border."
- 17 February: The Ukrainian Joint Forces press center reported to the press that pro-Russian forces had broken the ceasefire on 60 occasions, most of them involving the use of heavy artillery and mortars. In the main incidents in the northern front, residential areas of Stanytsia Luhanska were hit by thirty-two 122 mm artillery rounds. Most of the city was left without power, while a kindergarten was damaged and three civilians were wounded. Novotoshkivke was shelled three times with anti-tank rocket launchers, 120 mm mortars and 122 mm artillery. Pro-Russian tanks opened fire on Ukrainian redoubts at Troitske, supported by 82 mm and 120 mm mortars. Luhansk became the target of 120 mm mortars and 122 mm heavy artillery. In the eastern area of operations, a 152 mm artillery barrage hit Prichepilivka, while antitank guided missiles were fired at Novoselivka. Avdiivka and Nevelske received fire from 120 mm mortars. Russian-backed rebels and Ukrainian forces accused each other of firing across the ceasefire line, "raising alarm at a time when Western countries have warned of the possibility of a Russian invasion any day. The details of the incidents could not be independently confirmed, and the initial reports suggested they were on a similar scale to ceasefire violations that have been common throughout the eight year conflict." Organization for Security and Cooperation in Europe (OSCE) monitors had recorded "multiple shelling incidents along the line of contact" and 870 ceasefire violations.
- 18 February: The leader of the self-proclaimed Donetsk People's Republic, Denis Pushilin, announced a massive evacuation of civilians to Rostov Oblast, Russia, amid the deteriorating security situation in the region. A similar operation was also announced by the head of the self-styled Luhansk People Republic, Leonid Pasechnik.
- 19 February: The leaders of the breakaway republics in Donbas declared general mobilisation and ordered women and children to evacuate to Russia. Russian intelligence service FSB said that two Ukrainian shells landed on Russian territory. Ukrainian military sources said that the pictures of shells were faked and that "mercenaries had arrived in separatist-held eastern Ukraine to stage provocations in collaboration with Russian special forces." The Ukrainian Joint Forces press center reported 136 pro-Russian violations of the ceasefire, 116 of them using weapons banned by the Minsk agreements. Two Ukrainian soldiers were killed by separatist artillery fire and four others were wounded. In the main incidents, in the eastern front, Marinka came under fire four times, being the target of 120 mm mortars and anti-tank guided missiles. Novotroitske was pounded on six different occasions with automatic grenade launchers, 82 mm mortars, 120 mm mortars and 122 mm artillery. Starohnativka was shelled four times with 82 mm mortars, 120 mm mortars, 122 mm and 152 mm artillery. Novohnativka received fire on three occasions from 120 mm mortars and 122 mm artillery. In the northern front, pro-Russian tanks engaged Ukrainian positions around Stanytsia Luhanska four times, supported by 120 mm mortars and 122 mm artillery. Krymske was the subject of five attacks using heavy machine guns, anti-tank rocket launchers, 73 mm anti-tank recoilless rifles, 82 mm mortars, 120 mm mortars and 122 mm artillery. Shchastya was the target, on five occasions, of heavy machine guns, automatic grenade launchers and 82 mm mortars. Zaitseve received fire three times from 120 mm mortars and 152 mm artillery.
- 20 February: The Ukrainian defense ministry reported a total of 116 ceasefire violations by Russian occupation forces with heavy shelling, including incidents involving weapons banned by the Minsk agreements. Some residents of the separatist-controlled areas told CNN reporters of heavy shelling, its origin unclear. Russian authorities said that 40,000 people were evacuated to Russia, a number CNN was not able to verify independently. A United Nations High Commissioner for Refugees convoy was caught in crossfire at the Shchastia crossing point for international humanitarian organizations.
- 21 February: After a formal petition from the breakaway republics, Vladimir Putin signed the State Duma motion recognising the independence of the Donetsk People's Republic and Luhansk People's Republic. Two Ukrainian soldiers were reported killed by shelling in the village of Zaitseve, 30 km north of Donetsk.
- 23 February: Ukraine started drafting reservists aged 18–60 after the president's order.
- 24 February: Russia invades Ukraine with bombings and troops crossing borders. By noon several targets in different locations had been bombed, civilians and military personnel/hardware from both sides were killed and injured.
