= Timeline of the war in Donbas (2020) =

- 2014; 2015; 2016; 2017; 2018; 2019; 2020; 2021; 2022

This is a timeline of the war in Donbas for the year 2020.

== January–March ==
- 10 January: The Ukrainian operational headquarters reported that pro-Russian forces had broken the ceasefire 13 times on 10 January. In the eastern front, Vodiane was shelled from Pikuzy with 82 mm mortars. Ukrainian positions at Marinka, Nevelske, Vodiane and Novotroitske also received fire from small arms and automatic grenade launchers. In the northern area of operations, pro-Russian 122 mm self-propelled artillery from Zolote-5 fired upon Ukrainian redoubts around Orikhove supported by small arms, grenades launchers, 82 mm mortars and 120 mm mortars. Luhanske was meanwhile hit by anti-tank rocket fire and 82 mm mortar volleys fired from Lohvynove. Novotoshkivke became the target of 120 mm mortars firing from Holubovske, while pro-Russian forces from Gagarin fired anti-tank rockets at Pivdenne.
- 16 January: The headquarters of the Ukrainian Joint Forces recorded 12 pro-Russian violations of the ceasefire on 16 January; one Ukrainian soldier was killed in action. In the eastern area of operations, Ukrainian positions at Novotroitske received harassing fire from infantry weapons and different grenade-launcher systems. In the northern front, pro-Russian forces launched a substantial attack on Orikhove using small arms, 120 mm mortars, 122 mm and 152 mm self-propelled artillery. Novotoshkivke was hit by 82 mm and 120 mm mortar barrages. Travneve, Mironovske, Novozvanivka, Zaitseve and Luhanske became the target of small arms, snipers and grenade launchers.
- 17 January: Ukraine, Russia and the rebel republics agreed in Minsk on a new disengagement area around Hnutove.
- 24 January: The Ukrainian Joint Forces press centre recorded 12 pro-Russian violations of the ceasefire on 24 January; one Ukrainian soldier was wounded. In the eastern front, Ukrainian entrenchments at Opytne were hit by an antitank guided missile and 120 mm mortar volleys. Pavlopil and Talakivka received fire from small arms, heavy machine guns and 73 mm anti-tank recoilless rifles. At Pavlopil. Ukrainian troops were also harassed with sniper fire. Nevelske became the target of infantry weapons and automatic grenade launchers, while Pisky was struck by small arms fire, heavy machine gun fire and anti-tank rockets. In the northern area of operations, pro-Russian self-propelled artillery engaged Ukrainian positions at Orikhove. Luhanske received fire from heavy machine guns, grenades and rockets, and 82 mm mortars. Novoluhanske was hit by heavy machine gun fire and 73 mm ani-tank rounds.
- 26 January: The press centre of the Ukrainian Joint Forces reported 12 pro-Russian violations of the ceasefire on 26 January. Two Ukrainian soldiers were killed and another two wounded. In the eastern area of operations, pro-Russian BMP armoured vehicles from Sakhanka launched an attack on Ukrainian positions at Lebedinske, supported by grenade and rocket fire and 82 mm mortars. Krasnohorivka and Starohnativka received fire from heavy machine guns and 73 mm anti-tank recoilless rifles, while Hnutove and Novohryhorivka became the target of small arms and different grenade-launcher systems. In the northern area of operations, Orikhove came under the combined fire of 82 mm and 120 mm mortars. Novotoshkivke and Krymske were struck by 120 mm mortar volleys. Ukrainian forces returned fire. Small arms fire was also reported inside the disengagement area around Bohdanivka. One Ukrainian soldier was killed by the blast of an improvised explosive device, and another by direct enemy fire.
- 18 February: Ukrainian authorities announced that pro-Russian forces launched a coordinate assault along the demarcation line in the area between Zolote and Orikhove, in the northern area of operations. Vilnyi, Novotoshkivske, Orikhove and Krymske were fired upon with infantry weapons, 82 mm mortars and 120 mm mortars. The main engagement began at 5:00 am, when positions of the 72nd Ukrainian Brigade received the brunt of the attack. The brigade was forced to abandon their entrenchments under heavy fire from 82 mm and 120 mm mortars. One Ukrainian soldier was killed and four others wounded. The Ukrainian military eventually hold their lines by evening, although an observation post was overrun and captured by pro-Russian forces near Zolote.
  The headquarters of the Ukrainian Joint Forces reported 22 pro-Russian violations of the ceasefire, 19 of them in the area of the offensive. Pro-Russian tanks launched a massive assault on Ukrainian redoubts around Novotoshkivke, firing 56 main gun rounds and supported by heavy shelling from 120 mm mortars as well as 122 mm and 152 mm self-propelled artillery. Intense shelling was also recorded at Orikhove, which became the target of anti-tank rocket launchers, 82 mm and 120 mm mortars and 122 mm and 152 mm self-propelled artillery. Vilnyi received fire from heavy machine guns, 73 mm anti-tank recoilless rifles, 82 mm mortars, 120 mm mortars and 122 mm self-propelled artillery. BMP armoured vehicles launched a sustained attack on Krymske supported by small arms, antitank rocket launchers, 82 mm mortars and 120 mm mortars. Zolote-4 was attacked with heavy machine gun fire, automatic grenade launchers, anti-tank rockets, 73 mm anti-tank rounds and 120 mm mortars. Minor attacks took place in Popasna, Luhanske and Novoluhanske, where pro-Russian forces used small arms, rocket propelled grenades, 82 mm mortars and 122 mm artillery.
  The body of one Ukrainian soldier was recovered by pro-Russian troops and handed over to Ukrainian authorities on 20 February.
  The Organization for Security and Cooperation in Europe (OSCE) recorded 2,300 explosions on the front lines in eastern Ukraine before noon. United Nations Under-Secretary-General for Political Affairs and Peacebuilding Affairs Rosemary DiCarlo said that there is a "very real risk of backsliding and further violence" in Donbas.
- 23 February: The press centre of the Ukrainian Joint Forces recorded 14 pro-Russian violations of the ceasefire. Pro-Russian forces intensified their operations on this date. In the eastern area of operations, an airstrike was carried out by a hostile drone on Ukrainian positions around Talakivka fitted with a VOG-17 grenades. In the northern front, heavy shelling was reported at Novoleksandrivka, which became the target of 120 mm mortars and 122 mm artillery. BMP-2 armoured vehicles launched an attack on Luhanske, supported by grenade launchers, 82 mm mortars and 120 mm mortars. Krymske was hit by heavy machine gun fire, antitank rockets and 120 mm mortar volleys; 120 mm mortars were likewise fired at Orikhove. Novozvanivka, Zolote-4, Vilnyi and Popasna came under 82 mm mortar fire.
- 29 February: Sources from the Ukrainian Joint Forces press centre reported an escalation in fighting in eastern Ukraine, where pro-Russian forces attacked Ukrainian positions 19 times on 29 February. Three Ukrainian soldiers were wounded. Pro-Russian authorities at Donetsk city recorded 22 Ukrainian violations of the ceasefire in 11 places the previous day. The Ukrainian military used small arms, heavy machine guns, anti-tank rocket launchers, 73 mm anti-tank recoilless rifles, 82 mm mortars, 120 mm mortars, armoured personnel carriers and armoured fighting vehicles.
- 9 March: The Ukrainian Joint Forces press centre recorded 10 pro-Russian attacks on their troops on 9 March; One Ukrainian soldier was wounded in action. According to the same sources, pro-Russian forces launched an airstrike on a military ambulance near Talakivka using drones fitted with VOG-17 grenades.
- 10 March: According to the headquarters of the Ukrainian Joint Forces, pro-Russian forces launched 17 attacks on Ukrainian positions. Three Ukrainian soldiers were confirmed dead, two by an anti-tank guided missile near Pisky and another by mortar fire. Nine servicemen were wounded.
- 19 March: The Ukrainian Joint Forces headquarters reported 15 incidents involving hostile fire on 16 March, one Ukrainian soldier was killed in action and another wounded.
- 27 March: The spokesman of the Donetsk People's Republic army, Eduard Basurin, reported that Ukrainian forces broke the ceasefire 55 times during the past week. The Ukrainian army targeted 18 settlements and fired 136 rounds from 82 mm and 120 mm mortars, 185 grenades launched from different weapon-systems and an anti-tank guided missiles. Four civilians and a civilian representative at the Joint Centre for Control and Co-ordination (JCCC) were wounded and 16 residential buildings were damaged.
- 28 March: The headquarters of the Ukrainian Joint Forces recorded 15 attacks on their positions the previous day; two Ukrainian soldiers were severely wounded. Pro-Russian officials from Donetsk city recorded 16 Ukrainian violations of the ceasefire on their troops in ten locations using small arms, heavy machine guns, automatic grenade launchers, 73 mm anti-tank recoilless rifles, 82 mm mortars, 120 mm mortars, armoured personnel carriers, armoured fighting vehicles and 122 mm self-propelled artillery.
- 30 March: The headquarters of the Ukrainian Joint Forces reported 18 attacks on their positions on 29 March. One Ukrainian soldier was killed in action and four others wounded.

== April–June ==
- 3 April: The press centre of the Ukrainian Joint Forces reported 16 attacks on their positions by pro-Russian troops.
- 7 April: Pro-Russian forces launched a drone strike on Ukrainian troops at Avdiivka, in the eastern area of operations; a civilian vehicle carrying journalists from a Ukrainian TV channel was also targeted. The unmanned vehicle was armed with VOG-17 grenades.
- 9 April: According to the press centre of the Ukrainian Joint Forces, pro-Russian attacks intensified today, with 21 ceasefire violations registered the past day. One Ukrainian soldier was killed in action, two other were wounded.
- 10 April: The headquarters of the Ukrainian Joint Forces recorded 17 pro-Russian violations of the truce on 10 April, one Ukrainian soldier was wounded.
- 16 April: Ukraine handed over 14 pro-Russian prisoners in exchange for 20 Ukrainians held by both separatist republics. Only two of the Ukrainians released were military personnel.
- 25 April: The press centre of the Ukrainian Joint Forces recorded 16 pro-Russian violations of the ceasefire on 25 April. One Ukrainian soldier was wounded in action.
- 1 May: The HQ of the Ukrainian Joint Forces reported a surge in pro-Russian attacks on their troops after 24 violations of the ceasefire the previous day. Three Ukrainian soldiers were wounded.
- 2 May: The press centre of the Ukrainian Joint Forces told the press that pro-Russian forces broke the truce 23 times; two Ukrainian soldiers were wounded in action. Pro-Russian forces carried out a drone strike on Ukrainian positions around Hnutove. The unmanned aircraft dropped VOG-17 grenades, and a soldier received shrapnel wounds. The Ukrainian military retaliated by firing on pro-Russian positions in the area. Besides the drone attack, pro-Russian troops in the eastern area of operations fired upon Avdiivka repeatedly using small arms, heavy machine guns, anti-tank rocket launchers, 73 mm anti-tank recoilless rifles, 82 mm mortars and 120 mm mortars. Bohdanivka was meanwhile hit by small arms fire and 82 mm mortar volleys. In the northern front, heavy shelling was reported at Orikhove and Vilnyi, where Ukrainian positions were struck by 82 mm and 120 mm mortar barrages. Krymske became the target of infantry weapons, grenade launchers and 120 mm mortars; 82 mm mortar volleys landed in Novooleksandrivka. Travneve received fire from infantry weapons and different grenade-launcher systems. Pro-Russian authorities at Donetsk city recorded 14 Ukrainian violations of the ceasefire in 12 locations using small arms, heavy machine guns, automatic grenade launchers, anti-tank rocket launchers, 73 mm anti-tank recoilless rifles, 82 mm mortars, 120 mm mortars, armoured personnel carriers and armoured fighting vehicles.
- 6 May: A pro-Russian soldier from the Luhansk People's Republic was killed in action amid seven Ukrainian violations of the ceasefire at Holubivske, Donetskyi, Kalinove-Borshchevate, Molodezhne and Lohvynove using small arms and grenade launchers. In the northern area of operations, Ukrainian forces reported that one of their servicemen was wounded during an attack with rocket propelled grenades. The Ukrainian army returned fire.
- 20 May: The Medical Force Command of the Armed Forces of Ukraine reported 45 cases of COVID-19 among their troops. A total of 143 Ukrainian soldiers were isolated as of this date.
- 2 June: The Ukrainian Joint Forces press centre reported nine pro-Russian attacks on their positions. One Ukrainian soldier was wounded. In the eastern area of operations, Heavy shelling was reported at Staromykhailivka, which became the target of 120 mm mortars and 122 mm self-propelled artillery. Ukrainian redoubts at Pavlopil were hit in the morning by heavy machine gun fire, automatically launched grenades and 82 mm mortar volleys. In the evening, unguided airborne rockets were fired in the ground-to-ground mode on the same area from pro-Russian positions. Vodiane received fire from small arms, heavy machine guns and different grenade-launcher systems. Bohdanivka was struck by 82 mm mortar fire, while snipers harassed Ukrainian troops at Marinka. In the northern front, Mayorsk, Novozvanivka and Vilnyi came under small arms and anti-tank rocket fire.
- 20 June: The press centre of the Ukrainian Joint Forces issued a statement reporting an escalation of hostilities along the demarcation line. Pro-Russian forces launched a total of 28 attacks on Ukrainian positions. Three Ukrainian soldiers were wounded in action. In the eastern area of operations, Avdiivka became the target of heavy machine guns, anti-tank rocket launchers and 82 mm mortars. Pro-Russian armoured fighting vehicles engaged Ukrainian positions around the stronghold of Pavlopil, that also received fire from infantry weapons, different grenade-launcher systems and 82 mm mortars. The same area was targeted by pro-Russian forces with airborne unguided rockets launched in the ground to ground mode. In the northern front, heavy shelling was reported at Vilnyi and Popasna; both of them pounded with 82 mm mortars, 120 mm mortars and 122 mm self-propelled artillery. Ukrainian redoubts at Vilny were also engaged by 152 mm self-propelled artillery. Novooleksandrivka was likewise hit by 122 mm artillery barrages, as well as Troitske, Orikhove, Zolote-4 and Shumy. Orikhove, Novozvanivka, Troitske and Novotoshkivke came under 120 mm mortar fire, while 82 mm mortar volleys landed in Luhanske, Novotoshkivke and Novooleksandrivka. Small arms fire was reported at Zalizne.
- 24 June: The Minister of Defence of Ukraine confirmed that the Ukrainian army received the first batch of Javelin anti-tank missiles from the US as part of a contract signed with the United States in December 2019.
- 27 June: According to the Ukrainian Joint Forces Command there were 12 pro-Russian violations of the ceasefire. In the eastern area of operations, pro-Russian forces fired heavy machine guns, anti-tank rocket launchers, 82 mm mortars, 120 mm mortars and 122 mm self-propelled artillery upon Ukrainian positions near Avdiivka. In the region of Mariupol, Hranitne became the target of 82 mm mortars and anti-tank guided missiles. Ukrainian positions at Marinka received fire from automatic grenade launchers. In the northern front, 73 mm anti-tank recoilless rifles were also fired at Svitlodarsk As a result, one Ukrainian soldier died of his injuries, and three others were wounded. Ukrainian troops fired back. Later in the day another Ukrainian soldier was wounded in Marinka after stepping on an anti-personnel mine.

== July–September ==
- 22 July: A new ceasefire was arranged by the warring parties at Minsk from 27 July.
- 24 July: The press centre of the Ukrainian Joint Forces recorded eight pro-Russian attacks on their troops. Ukrainian positions received fire from small arms, different grenade-launcher systems and 120 mm mortars.
- 25 July: The headquarters of the Ukrainian Joint Forces recorded 15 pro-Russian attacks on their forces on 25 July. Pro-Russian forces used small arms, heavy machine guns, different grenade-launcher systems, 82 mm mortars and 120 mm mortars.
- 26 July: The press centre of the Ukrainian Joint forces reported 13 pro-Russian attacks on their positions on 26 July. The separatists used small arms, heavy machine guns, anti-tank rocket launchers, POMZ-2 anti-personnel mine-launchers, 82 mm mortars, 120 mm mortars, armoured fighting vehicles, 122 mm self-propelled artillery and armed drones. One Ukrainian soldier was wounded. In the main incidents, Ukrainian redoubts at Avdiivka were hit by heavy machine gun fire, anti-tank rockets and 82 mm mortar volleys. A pro-Russian drone dropped VOG-17 grenades on Ukrainian positions at Vodiane. the Ukrainian army returned fire. Pro-Russian forces employed small arms, different grenade launcher systems, 82 mm mortars, 120 mm mortars and armoured fighting vehicles to engage Ukrainian positions at Pivdenne, Shyrokyne, Pyshchevyk, Pisky, Opytne and Lebedynske. Later in the evening, pro-Russian forces fired a POM-2 personnel mine-launcher in the area of Novomykhailivka, and three rocket-assisted 122 mm artillery rounds at Avdiivka. Sniper fire was reported at Shchastya.
- 27 July: The new ceasefire agreement entered into force at 00:00 local time.
- 31 July: According to the information provided by the press centre of the Ukrainian Joint Forces in the morning, pro-Russian troops had opened fire on four occasions on Ukrainian positions on 31 July 2020. Most incidents involved the use of small arms and automatic grenade launchers against Ukrainian positions around the villages of Pivdenne, Vodiane and Luhanske.
- 1 August: There were three pro-Russian violations of the ceasefire according to the headquarters of the Ukrainian Joint Forces. Two Ukrainian soldiers were wounded, one of them by the blast of an improvised explosive device.
- 3 September: Several wildfires erupted on this date in some areas across the demarcation line, leaving two Ukrainian servicemen missing and two injured. It was later established that the two soldiers had stepping on landmines and had been killed by the blast.
- 6 September: The Ukrainian Joint Forces press centre reported the first targeting attack on Ukrainian positions since the beginning of the ceasefire 42 days ago. Pro-Russian forces fired automatic grenade launchers at Ukrainian troops fighting a wildfire around the village of Krasnohorivka. One Ukrainian soldier was wounded in action. Recent ceasefire violations had consisted of aimless small arms fire and grenade launchers fired in the general direction of the demarcation line. Later in the evening it was announced that a Ukrainian soldier was killed in action by enemy gunfire near Prychepylivka, A third violation of the ceasefire took place at Shumy, where pro-Russian infantry fired under-barrel grenades. Two soldiers were severely wounded after the tanker truck he was riding on hit a landmine in the outskirts of Novhorodske. One of them was pronounced dead on 7 September.
- 30 September: The press center of the Ukrainian Joint Forces reported 11 pro-Russian attacks on their positions. In the eastern area of operations, Ukrainian troops at Avdiivka were harassed with small arms fire, while Novotroitske was shelled with automatic grenade launchers. In the northern front, pro-Russian forces fired different grenade-launcher systems at Ukrainian redoubts near Zaitseve, Myronovske and Novotoshkivske. Nearby Vilnyi became the target of anti-tank rocket launchers. Zolote was fired at from small arms and under-barrel grenade launchers, while small arms fire was recorded at Novooleksandrivka.

== October–December ==
- 3 October: The press center of the Ukrainian Joint Forces recorded five pro-Russian violations of the ceasefire. In the eastern area of operations, Vodiane and Marinka received small arms and anti-tank rocket fire. Novoselivka became the target of different grenade-launcher systems, as well as Prichepylevka, in the northern front. In this area, Ukrainian troops were harassed with small arms fire near the village of Mayorsk.
- 8 October: Pro-Russian authorities from Donetsk city reported that Ukrainian forces launched two anti-tank guided missiles on the area of Donetsk airport, the first use of this weapon since the 22 July ceasefire.
- 11 October: For the second time in 72 hours, Ukrainian forces from Opytne fired anti-tank guided missiles at Donetsk airport, according to pro-Russian sources in Donetsk city.
- 12 October: The Ukrainian Joint Forces press center reported seven pro-Russian attacks on their positions on this date. The stronghold of Avdiivka, in the eastern front, was hit by small arms fire and rocket-propelled grenades. In the northern front, Mayorsk, Novoluhanske and Kamyshevakha were shelled with automatic grenade launchers. Small arms was reported at Orikhove.
- 13 October: According to the Ukrainian Joint Forces press center, there were six pro-Russian violations of the ceasefire. Pisky, in the eastern front, was shelled with automatic grenade launchers. In the northern area of operations, Zaitseve and Vilnyi received anti-tank rocket fire, while Orikhove received fire from automatic grenade launchers. Two pro-Russian drones flying over Pishchevyk and Vodiane were neutralized by Ukrainian forces using electronic jammers.
- 15 October: The press center of the Ukrainian Joint Forces recorded six pro-Russian attacks on their troops. In the eastern area of operations, Avdiivka received fire from small arms and different grenade-launcher systems; Novotoshkivke, in the northern front, was fired at by the same means. Prichepylevka was attacked with small arms and automatic grenade launchers. A pro-Russian drone flying over the Sea of Azov was suppressed by Ukrainian forces using electronic countermeasures.
- 17 October: The Ukrainian Joint Forces press center told the press that pro-Russian forces committed five violations of the ceasefire. Avdiivka and Vodiane, in the eastern area of operations, and Shumy, in the northern front, were the target of different grenade-launcher systems. A pro-Russian drone was neutralized by electronic countermeasures.
- 20 October: According to the press center of the Ukrainian Joint Forces, pro-Russian forces broke the ceasefire on six occasions on this date. Avdiivka, in the eastern area of operations, came under fire from small arms and different grenade-launcher systems. In the northern front, Ukrainian troops at Mayorsk and Svitlodarsk were harassed with small arms fire. Ukrainian forces neutralized a pro-Russian drone by electronic countermeasures. One Ukrainian soldier suffered an eardrum injury.
- 21 October: The press center of the Ukrainian Joint Forces reported five pro-Russian attacks on their positions on this date. In the eastern front, Avdiivka came under fire from different grenade-launcher systems. Ukrainian positions received small arms fire at Lebedinske. An Orlan-10 hostile drone was neutralized by electronic jamming in an area between Avdiivka and Marinka. In the northern area of operations, Ukrainian troops at Artema were harassed with small arms fire. The Ukrainian side returned fire. The Ukrainian military reported 131 new cases of COVID-19 among their troops. As of 21 October, there had been 3433 soldiers recovered, 1107 active cases and 14 deaths.
- 22 October: The Ukrainian Joint Forces press center told the press that pro-Russian forces had broken the truce on five occasions on this date., most of them in the northern front. Novoluhanske was pounded with automatic grenade launchers, while Ukrainian positions at Artema and Shumy received small arms fire. A pro-Russian drone overflying the Sea of Azov shoreline was suppressed by electronic countermeasures.
- 30 October: The press center of the Ukrainian Joint Forces reported two infantry weapons attacks on their positions at Vodiane, in the eastern area of operations, using small arms and grenade launchers, and a drone strike near Zolote-4 with VOG-25 grenades, in the northern front. The attacks on Vodiane left two Ukrainian soldiers killed in action. Two Ukrainian soldiers were wounded, one in Vodiane and another as a result of the drone sortie on Zolote-4.
- 6 November: The Ukrainian Joint Forces press center reported 11 pro-Russian attacks on their positions. Most incidents occurred in the eastern area of operations, where Ukrainian positions at Starohnativka, Vodiane and Avdiivka received fire from pro-Russian forces using heavy machine guns, different grenade-launcher systems and 82 mm mortars. Ukrainian troops returned fire near Vodiane. Popasna, in the northern front, came under attack from heavy machine guns and armed drones. A Ukrainian soldier was wounded when his trench was hit by a VOG-17 grenade launched by the unmanned aircraft.
- 13 November: The press center of the Ukrainian Joint Forces recorded five pro-Russian violations of the ceasefire. In the eastern area of operations, Ukrainian positions at Kamianka were hit by automatically launched grenades and anti-tank rocket fire. Ukrainian troops at Marinka were harassed with sniper fire. Ukrainian troops returned fire. In the northern front, an armed pro-Russian drone was neutralized with electronic countermeasures by Ukrainian forces.
- 22 November: According to the press center of the Ukrainian Joint Forces, pro-Russian forces broke the ceasefire on six occasions on this date. Ukrainian positions in Avdiivka, in the eastern area of operations, were shelled with automatic grenade launchers, while Vodiane was attacked with small arms, automatic grenade launchers and POM-2 personnel mines launchers. Novoluhanske, in the northern front, came under anti-tank rocket fire.
- 24 November: There were four pro-Russian attacks on Ukrainian positions on this date, according to the press center of the Ukrainian Joint Force. In the eastern area of operations, small arms fire was reported at Vodiane, while Ukrainian troops at Avdiivka received sniper fire. In the northern front, pro-Russian forces fired small arms and under-barrel launched grenades in the surroundings of Shumy and Pivdenne. One Ukrainian soldier was killed by a sniper near Avdiivka.
- 28 November: The Ukrainian Joint Forces press centre reported nine pro-Russian attacks on their positions on this date. In the eastern area of operations, Vodiane was the target of a multiple weapon attack. Pro-Russian forces from Uzhivka used small arms, heavy machine guns, different grenade-launcher systems, 82 mm mortars, 120 mm mortars and POM-2 personnel mines launchers. In the northern front, Pivdenne received fire from small arms and anti-tank rocket launchers, while Ukrainian troops near Luhanske were harassed with heavy machine gun fire. A pro-Russian quadrocopter drone was neutralized by electronic countermeasures over the coast of the Sea of Azov.
- 29 November: The press centre of the Ukrainian Joint Forces recorded four pro-Russian violations of the ceasefire, all of them in the northern front. Ukrainian positions around Katerinivka were attacked with different grenade-launcher systems and 82 mm mortars. Popasna meanwhile received small arms and anti-tank rocket fire. Pro-Russian infantry sneaked through the demarcation line to plant a minefield near Luhanske; Ukrainian forces repelled the intruders after a firefight. Several mines and other equipment were recovered. Ukrainian forces also reported they shot down over the same area a pro-Russian Granat-type drone, part of the Russian Navodchik-2 electronic warfare system whose presence in the Donbas had been confirmed by the OSCE mission on 20 November.
- 9 December: Nine ceasefire violations were recorded by the press centre of the Ukrainian Joint Forces. In the eastern area of operations, he surroundings of Talakivka received fire from small arms and different grenade-launcher systems. Ukrainian troops at Vodiane were harassed with automatic fire, while Avdiivka was shelled employing automatic grenade launchers. A pro-Russian drone from Mineralne was neutralized by electronic countermeasures.
- 15 December: The Ukrainian Joint Forces press centre registered 11 pro-Russian violations of the truce. In the eastern area of operations, small arms and different grenade-launcher systems were fired at Ukrainian positions near Opytne and Vodiane. In Avdiivka, pro-Russian forces used small arms, under-barrel grenade launchers and automatic grenade launchers to harass Ukrainian troops in the area. Shumy, in the northern front, became the target of the same kind of weapons.
- 28 December: According to the Ukrainian Joint Forces press centre, there were 13 pro-Russian attacks on their troops positions on this date. One Ukrainian soldier was wounded in action. In the eastern front, Vodiane was shelled with 120 mm mortars. A pro-Russian drone was neutralized by electronic countermeasures while directing fire over the same area. The surroundings of Marinka and Avdiivka received fire from different types of grenade launchers. Snipers were active in Chermalyk. In the northern area of operations, Pivdenne was hit by a barrage of 82 mm mortars, while Ukrainian positions around Svitlodarsk became the target of small arms and automatic grenade launchers. Novooleksandrivka was hit by small arms fire and anti-tank rockets.
