= January 2015 Mariupol rocket attack =

Attack on Mariupol by Russian and separatist forces, on January 24th 2015

- Part of War in Donbas
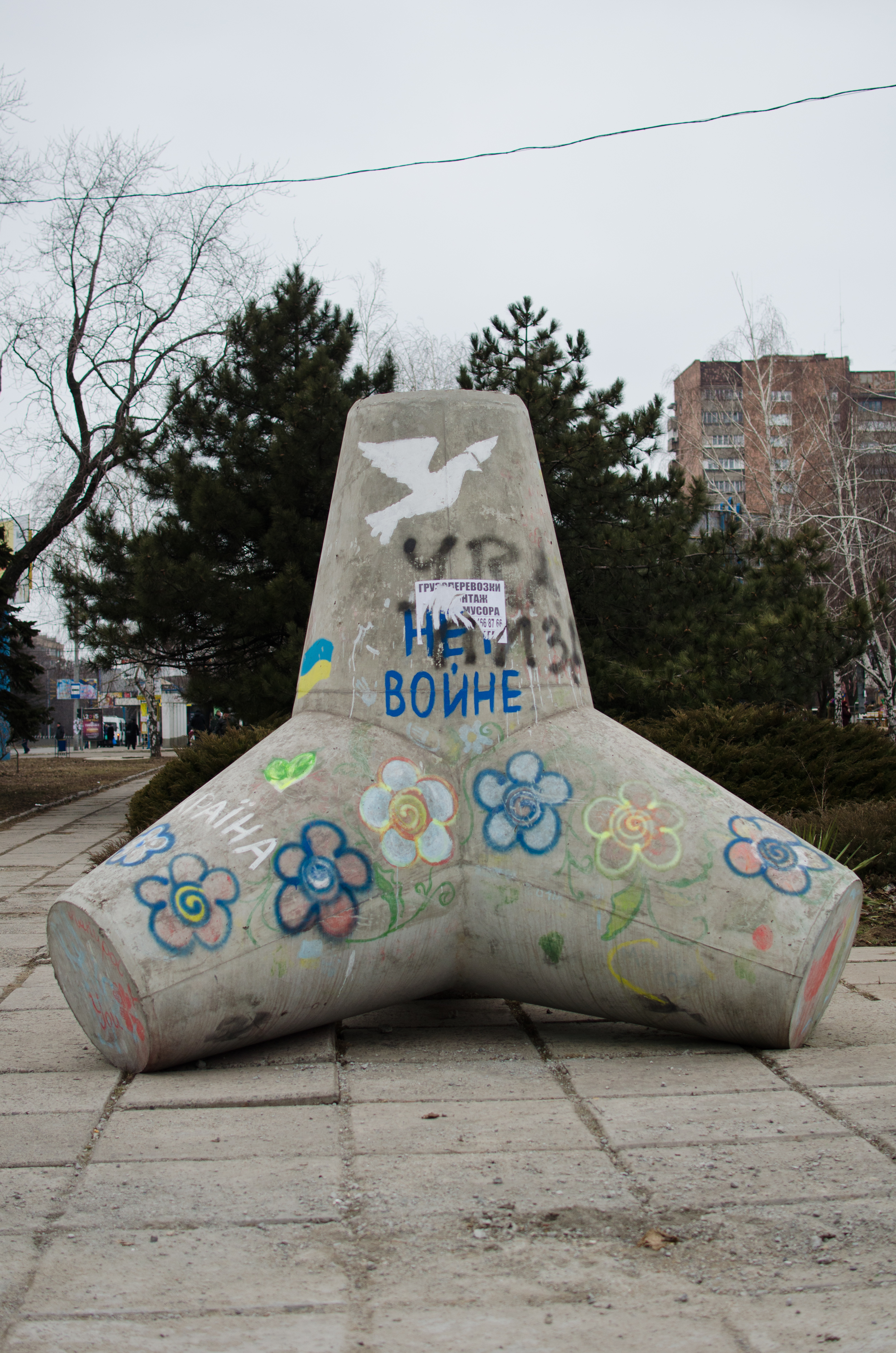
- Tetrapod in Mariupol with pro-Ukrainian and pro-peace graffiti

- Location of Mariupol in Ukraine
- Location: Mariupol, Donetsk Oblast, Ukraine
- Date: 24 January 2015; 11 years ago
- Attack type: Rocket attack
- Deaths: 31
- Injuries: 108
- Perpetrators: Russia and its state-sponsored separatist forces: Donetsk People's Republic; Lugansk People's Republic (per Ukraine)

A rocket attack on Mariupol was launched on 24 January 2015 by Russian and pro-Russian forces against the strategic maritime city of Mariupol, defended by Ukrainian government forces. Mariupol had come under attack multiple times in the previous year in the course of the War in Donbas, including in May–June 2014, when the city was under the control of Russian controlled forces; and in the September 2014 offensive.

On 24 January 2015, the Mariupol City Council and regional police said the city was subjected to indiscriminate rocket fire from the long-range Grad systems, killing at least 30 and injuring 128. Ukrainian officials said the rebels and the Russian military were responsible. According to Ukrainian intelligence, the attack was ordered by full-time Russian military commanders. In 2018, the Bellingcat open-data investigative group revealed evidence that officers and equipment of Russian forces were directly involved in the attack. The rebels denied the attack, but their leader, Alexander Zakharchenko, announced an offensive against Mariupol in the early morning of this day.

According to a spot report by the OSCE Special Monitoring Mission to Ukraine, the Grad and Uragan rockets originated from the areas controlled by the pro-Russian forces. United Nations political chief Jeffrey D. Feltman said the attacks "knowingly targeted civilians," violated international humanitarian law, and could amount to war crimes. The attack on Mariupol came 11 days after the deadly Volnovakha bus attack, when a rocket strike targeted a government checkpoint in the town of Volnovakha, hitting a passenger bus which resulted in the death of 12 civilians. Government officials attributed the incident to the separatists, but the rebels denied carrying out the attack.

== Background ==
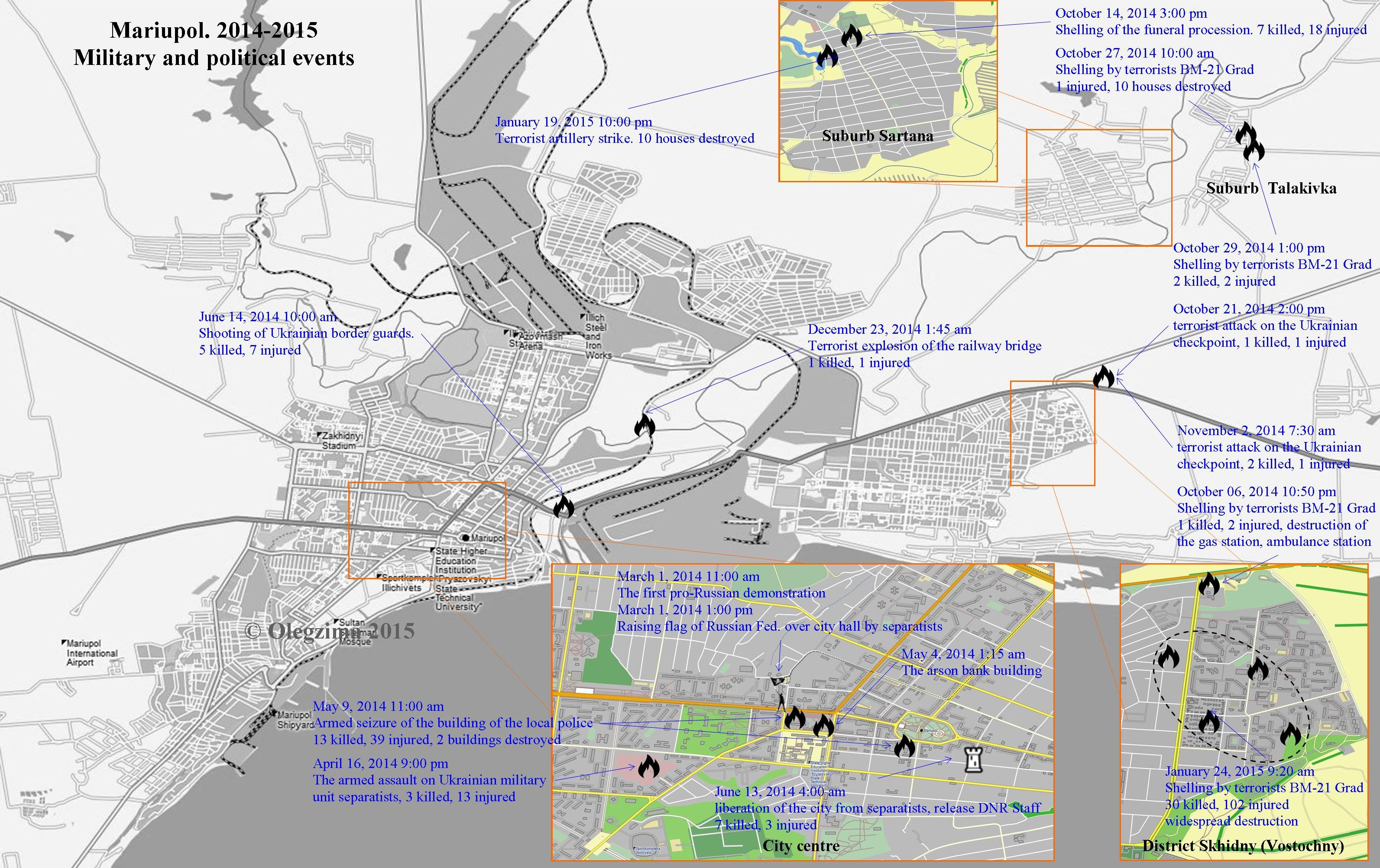
Military and political events in Mariupol between 2014 and 2015

Mariupol and Battle of Debaltseve were high-stake arenas for pro-Russian and Ukrainian forces as both cities are vital transport hubs, described as a "gateway to a land-bridge" to Russian-annexed Crimea, and strategically crucial to the pro-Russian objective of opening up and linking areas under their control with a view to securing the entire Donetsk and Luhansk regions.

On 22 January, pro-Russian extremists tried to attack Ukrainian positions on North-East of the city but failed. The next day, Alexander Zaharchenko vowed to fight until he reached the border of the Donetsk Oblast. Separatists reportedly began a tank offensive, and also conducted attacks near the west of the city. The village of Talakivka was reportedly shelled hard by separatists, but Ukrainian forces were "holding on". Andriy Lysenko confirmed the shelling, but said the separatists were still incapable of shelling the city itself because Ukrainian forces had not let them get close enough. Dmitry Tymchuk, a military blogger, reported on Facebook that a convoy of DPR tanks and APCs were advancing towards the city.

== Attack ==
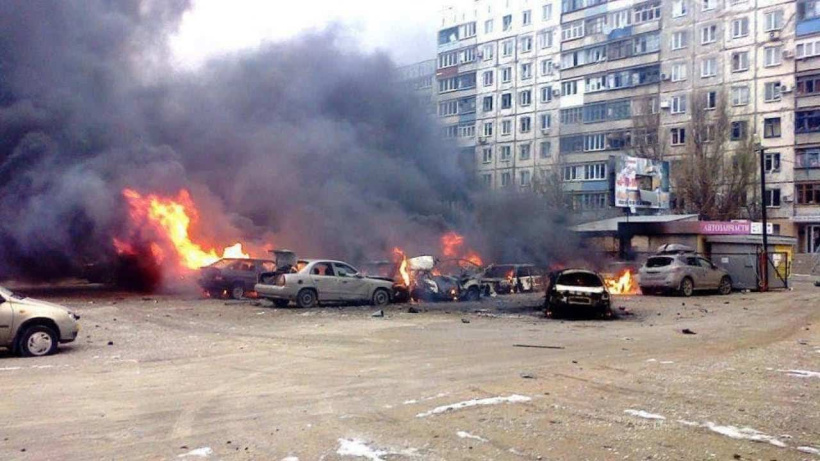
Burning cars

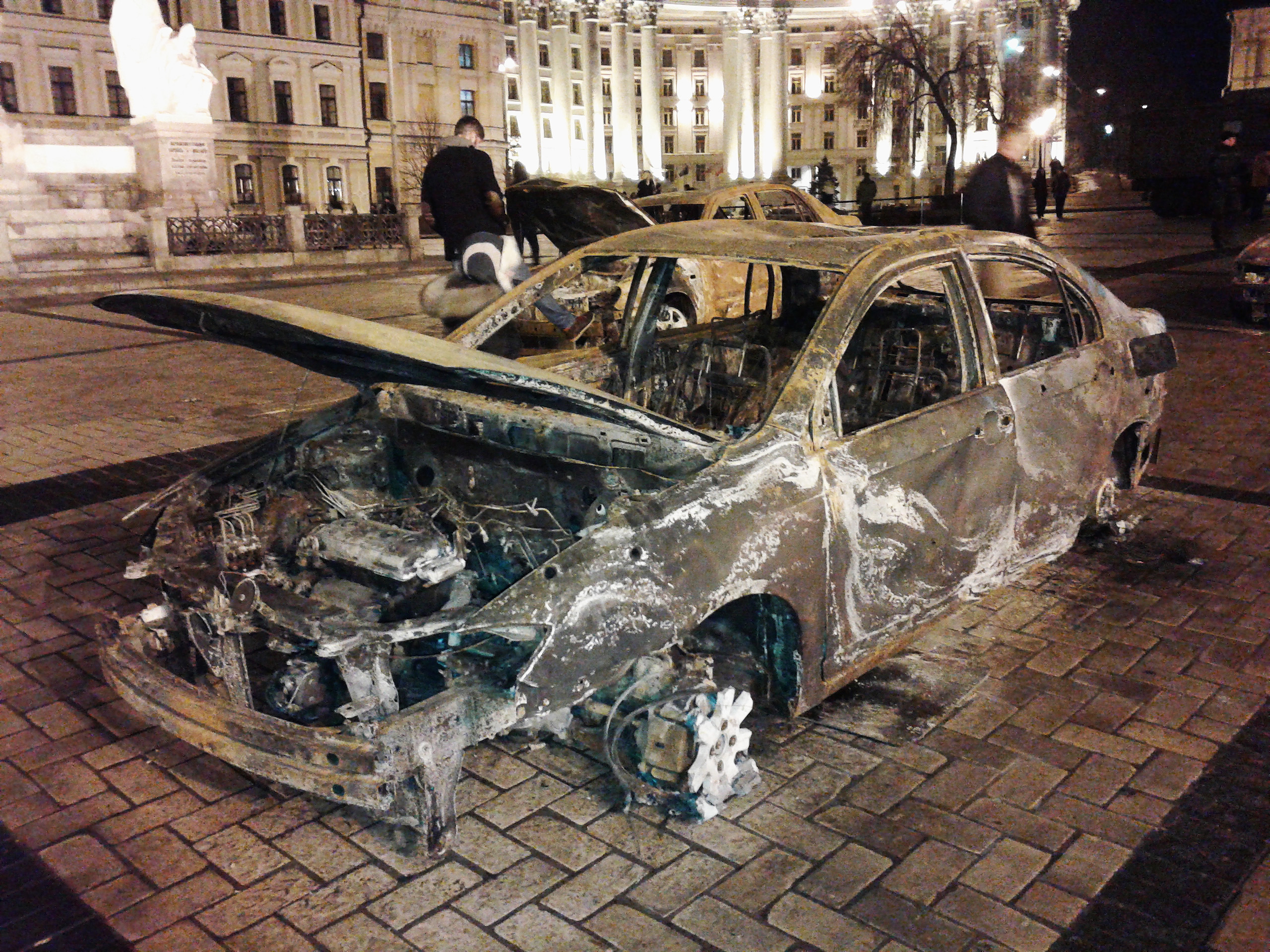
A charred civilian vehicle from Mariupol after the attack. Exhibition in Kyiv.

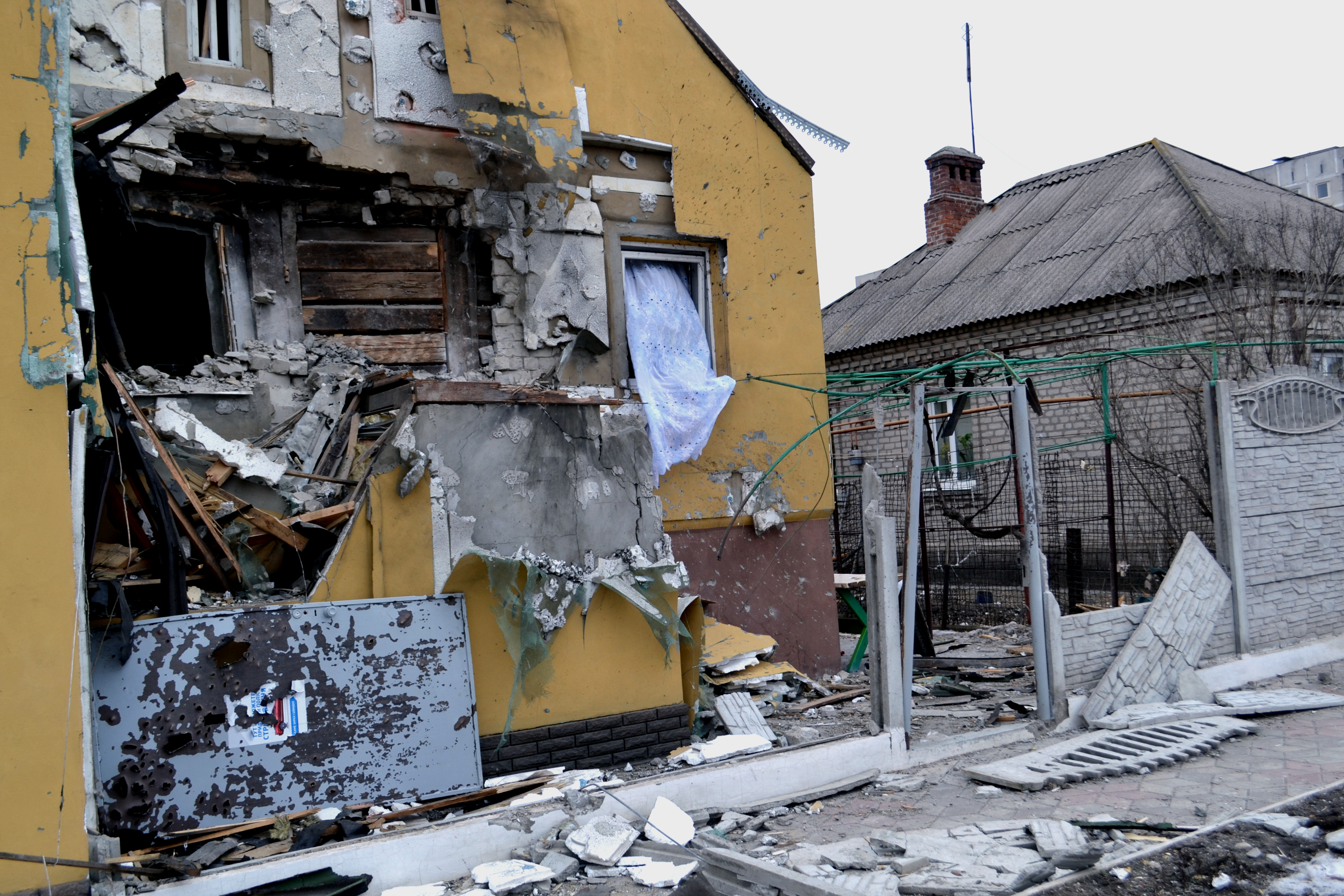
Destroyed house

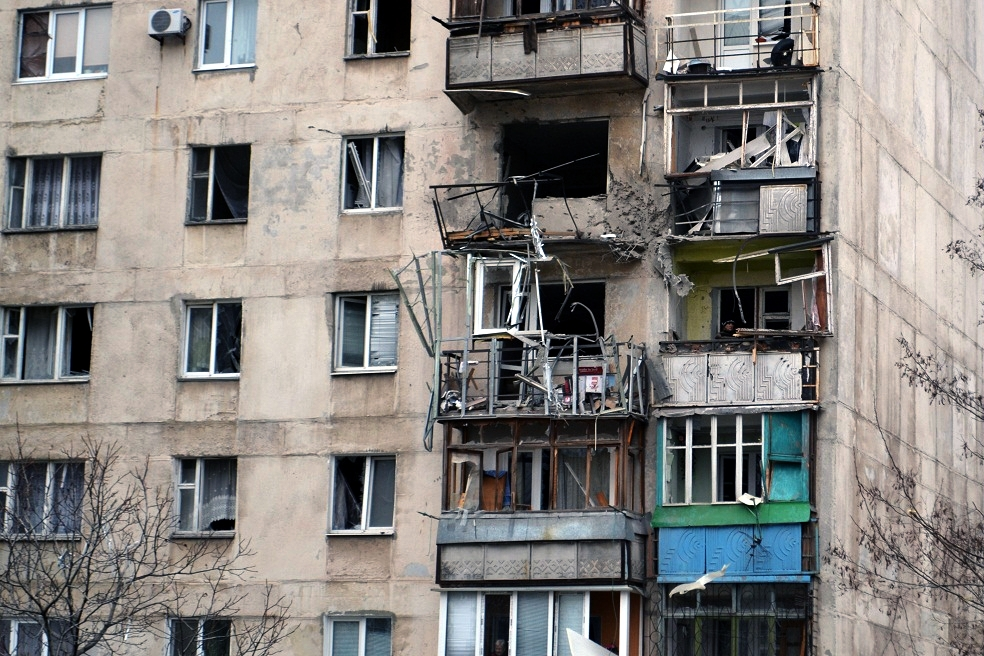
Damaged residential building

On 24 January, a major escalation took place after a rocket attack killed many people. Mariupol city authorities said that a Grad rocket hit a residential area in the city, and killed 20 people. Video footage showed that cars, buildings, and apartment flats were in flames as a result of the attack. The attack appeared to come from a multiple rocket launcher. One resident told Agence France-Presse on the telephone that the rebels had managed to seize Mariupol Airport, although rebels made no comment about that alleged airport seizure. The airport is located some 20 kilometers behind the front line. The rebels denied any involvement in the attack.

The rocket attacks came a day after the rebels rejected a peace deal and announced they were going on a multi-prong offensive against the government forces in Kyiv to vastly increase their territory. Despite rebel denials, Donetsk rebel leader Alexander Zakharchenko said that his forces had started an offensive on Mariupol, and rejected further talks with Kyiv; Zakharchenko said that "Today an offensive was launched on Mariupol. This will be the best possible monument to all our dead." Zakharchenko also stated that it was a provocation as DPR militants did not have the mentioned artillery systems and according to his sources the shelling was conducted from Staryi Krym. The death count rose to 27 people, with several more injured. Ukrainian Prime Minister Arseniy Yatsenyuk called for an urgent meeting of the UN Security Council.

A Ukrainian military checkpoint was also hit in the attack, killing one soldier. The city council urged citizens of Mariupol not to panic and said that "all units are fully battle-ready. Security measures in the city have been strengthened." The General Secretary of NATO, Jens Stoltenberg, condemned the attack, urging Russia to stop supporting the rebels. President Petro Poroshenko considered the attack a "crime against humanity", and cancelled his trip to Saudi Arabia. He also vowed to deliver a "full victory" over the rebels.

According to OSCE observers "Grad" and "Uragan" rockets were used in this attack, originating from villages of Oktyabr (19 km NE) and Zaichenko (15 km NE), both controlled by separatist forces. Later, pro-Russian extremists said they were not going to storm Mariupol and the offensive was only to strengthen positions around the city.

The next day, President Poroshenko vowed to calm the recent fighting in the strategic port city. Speaking at an emergency meeting at the Ukrainian Security council, he said that the Minsk Protocol signed on September 5 was the only solution to end the conflict. He said intercepted radio conversations proved that pro-Russian extremists were behind the attacks, but that the conversations hadn't yet been confirmed. Russia denied involvement in the attack, saying it was a result of Ukrainian forces shelling residential areas indiscriminately. Petro Poroshenko said Ukrainian forces killed most of the rebels involved in the shelling, and put the rebel casualties at 110. Six Grad missile launchers were also destroyed according to him, and he said that the SBU brought the artillery gun spotter back to Kyiv for questioning.

The Security Service of Ukraine (SBU) published a detailed timeline of the rocket attack.

== Aftermath ==
On 27 January, Azov Battalion members started training outside Mariupol should a rebel attack occur. Two of its members were killed in an attack on a checkpoint near the city the next day. On 1 February, the villages of Talakovka and Pavlopil near Mariupol city were heavily shelled by pro-Russian extremists, according to Ukrainian forces. On 3 February, separatists reportedly tried to attack Mariupol, but Ukrainian forces claimed they destroyed two enemy tanks and a group of insurgents near the city.

On 4 February, the Ukrainian SBU reported that they had successfully completed a special operation to liquidate the detachment of Russian Army which had conducted this attack.

On 10 February, the National Guard and the Azov Battalion launched an offensive on the town of Novoazovsk and quickly managed to capture the towns of Shyrokyne, Pavlopil, Kominternovo and Oktyabyr. Ukrainian forces managed to push the separatists back to Sakhanka, where the rebels were fighting back. However, fighting continued in the area and by late April, Deutsche Welle reported that pro-Russian militants had set up positions in the centre of Shyrokyne.

== International reactions ==
The attack was condemned in a public statement by the High Representative of the European Union for Foreign Affairs and Security Policy, Federica Mogherini. The condemnation by the United Nations Security Council was vetoed by Russia on the ground that the condemnation sought to blame Alexander Zakharchenko's announcement of beginning of the attack on Mariupol as irresponsible and condemned separatist forces which, according to Russia, are "self-defense forces". The attack and "provocative statements by self-defense leaders" were eventually condemned by UN Secretary-General Ban Ki-moon. The attack was also condemned by NATO.

== See also ==
- Outline of the Russo-Ukrainian War
