= 131st Reconnaissance Battalion (Ukraine) =

Ukrainian military volunteer unit

- 131-й окремий розвідувальний батальйон
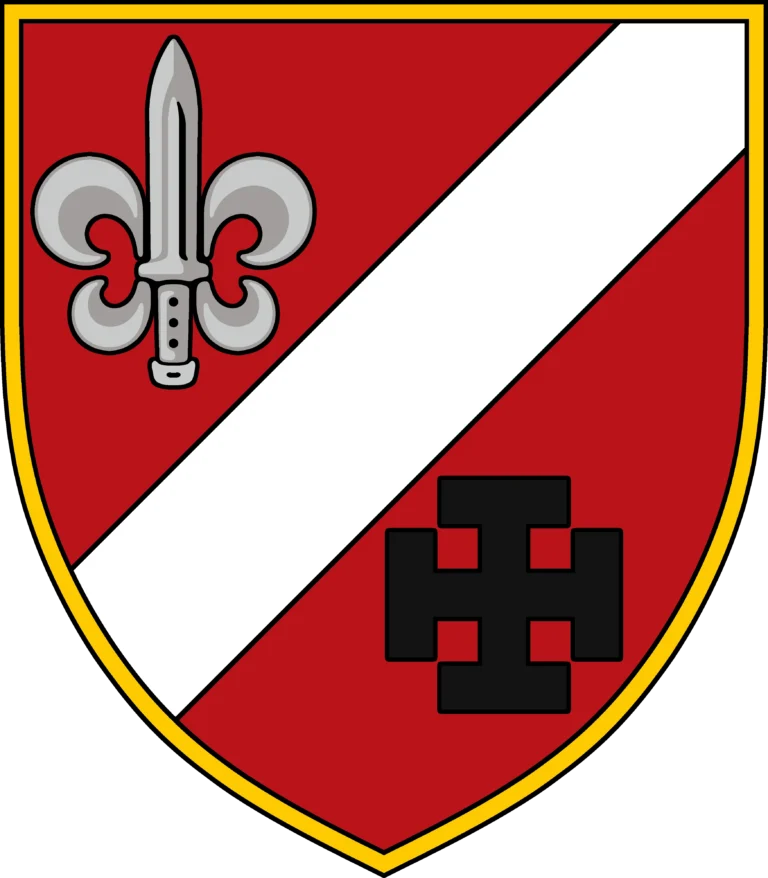
- Battalion's insignia
- Founded: April 1, 2014 –
- Country: Ukraine
- Allegiance: Armed Forces of Ukraine
- Branch: Ukrainian Ground Forces
- Type: Battalion, spetsnaz
- Role: Reconnaissance, counteroffensive and sabotage
- Part of: Operational Command South
- Garrison/HQ: Hushchyntsi, Vinnytsia Oblast
- Nickname: Yevhen Konovalets Battalion
- Patron: Yevhen Konovalets
- Engagements: Russo-Ukrainian War; War in Donbass; 2022 Russian invasion of Ukraine

Commanders
- Current commander: Lieutenant Colonel Kalembet Dmytro Serhiyovych

Insignia
- Former Insignia

- Former Field Insignia

The 131st Separate Reconnaissance Battalion "Colonel Yevhen Konovalets" (MUN A1445) is a battalion of the Ukrainian ground forces acting as an independent unit subordinated directly to the Operational Command South and has seen combat during both the War in Donbass and the Russo-Ukrainian war, performing reconnaissance and combat operations throughout the entire front.

== History ==
It was established on 1 April 2014, mainly from volunteers and operated mainly in the Southern and Mariupol directions during the War in Donbass participating in the liberation of Shyrokyne, Pavlopil and Pyshchevyk.

On 20 June 2015, two soldiers of the battalion, Nazarenko Andriy Volodymyrovych and Miloserdov Volodymyr Oleksandrovych were killed in a clash with a separatist DRG between Chermalyk and the Pavlopil. On 18 July 2015, a soldier of the battalion, Ryzhov Stanislav Anatoliyovych was killed by a landmine while performing a reconnaissance mission near Mariupol in Oktiabr. On 15 December 2015, while performing a combat reconnaissance mission near Pavlopil, a reconnaissance group of the battalion came under sniper fire killing one soldier, Nosenko Artem Vyacheslavovych.

On 7 July 2016, near Lopaskyne, a Volkswagen minibus of the battalion was blown up by a landmine, two soldiers of the battalion, Kovalskyi Anatoliy Viktorovych and Yablonsky Mykola Mykolayovych were killed. On 30 August 2016, a soldier of the battalion, Zhulynsky Mykola Volodymyrovych was killed by a Separatist sniper while performing a combat mission near Dovhe. On 11 November 2016, a soldier of the battalion, Oleg Olegovich Suprikin was killed while performing a combat operation in Malinove.

On 30 April 2017, while performing a combat mission near Katerynivka, Popasnyanskyi district, the battalion personnel came under heavy mortar shelling from Molodizhne, a soldier, Mayboroda Denis Anatoliyovych was killed and two more were wounded. On 13 December 2017, a soldier of the battalion, Kornelyuk Pavlo Volodymyrovych was killed by a Separatist sniper at an observation post in Kruta Balka.

A soldier of the battalion, Panin Viktor Vyacheslavovich, was killed in Avdiivka on 21 February 2018.

On 10 March 2020, at a position near Pisky, separatists' ATGMs hit a GAZ-66 of the battalion, two soldiers of the battalion, Soltys Viktor Mykolayovych and Andriy Oleksandrovych Vedeshin were killed and eight more were wounded, an additional soldier, Perezhogin Ilya Nikolaevich was killed by a sniper attack at the same position.

On 23 August 2021, a soldier of the battalion, Aksyonov Alexander Vasilyevich was killed as a result of separatist shelling on a stronghold.

Since the beginning of the 2022 Russian invasion of Ukraine, the battalion has actively participated in the Southern Ukraine campaign performing defensive, assault, reconnaissance, and other special tasks.

In early March 2022, a reconnaissance group of the battalion came under enemy fire near Luhove and a soldier, Obertiy Mykola Grigorovich went MIA and was later confirmed dead. A soldier of the battalion, Petruk Valentyn Vasylovich was killed in action on 23 April 2022 in Pokrovsk. An officer of the battalion, Gutnik Vadim Svyatoslavovych was killed in combat as a result of shelling on 26 July 2022. In September 2022, a reconnaissance group of the battalion successfully adjusted artillery and aviation fire on a Russian troop concentration in Mala Seidemynukha destroying equipment and personnel. It also engaged in small arms battles prompting Russian forces to withdraw. On 10 November 2022, the battalion liberated Snihurivka in the Mykolaiv Oblast.

On 6 September 2023, a soldier of the battalion, Orlov Andriy Igorovych (Hero of Ukraine) was killed in combat on the frontlines. On 1 October 2023, the 131st Separate Reconnaissance Battalion was awarded the honorary name "Colonel Yevhen Konovalets".

On 1 October 2023, Ukrainian President Volodymyr Zelenskyy handed a ribbon of honorary to the battalion to be named in honour of interwar period Ukrainian military and political leader of the Organisation of Ukrainian Nationalists Yevhen Konovalets.

A soldier of the battalion, Kryshtov Ivan Igorovich was killed by shelling on 29 July 2024.

== Commanders ==
- Lieutenant Colonel Kalembet Dmytro Serhiyovych (2022-)

== Structure ==
- Management & Headquarters
- 1st Reconnaissance Company
- 2nd Reconnaissance Company
- Long Range Reconnaissance Company
- UAV Reconnaissance Company
- Fire Support Company
- Maintenance Platoon
- Logistics Platoon
- Commandant Platoon
- Medical Center

== Sources ==
- Структура Сухопутних військ ЗС України
- 131 окремий розвідувальний батальйон
