= Battle of Mariupol =

The Battle of Mariupol may refer to:

- Battle of Mariupol (1919), between Soviet Ukraine and the volunteer army of the Russian White Movement
- Battle of Mariupol (May–June 2014), between Ukraine and the Donetsk People's Republic
- Battle of Mariupol (September 2014), between Donetsk People's Republic and Ukraine
- Siege of Mariupol (2022), between Russia and Ukraine

== See also ==
- January 2015 Mariupol rocket attack, artillery barrage by Donetsk People's Republic
