= Nikolske Raion =

Former subdivision of Donetsk Oblast, Ukraine

Nikolske Raion Нікольський район
- Raion
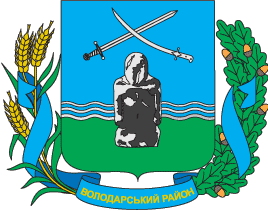
- Flag Coat of arms

- Coordinates: 47°12′11″N 37°19′21.5″E
- Country: Ukraine
- Region: Donetsk Oblast
- Established: 1925
- Disestablished: 18 July 2020 (de-jure)
- Admin. center: Nikolske
- Subdivisions: List: 0 — city councils; 1 — settlement councils; 10 — rural councils; Number of localities: 0 — cities; 1 — urban-type settlements; 31 — villages; 11 — rural settlements

Government
  - Governor: Vasyl′ Balabanov (until 2020)

Area
  - Total: 1,221 km^{2} (471 sq mi)

Population (2020)
  - Total: 27,337 ▼
  - Density: 22.39/km^{2} (57.99/sq mi)
- Time zone: UTC+02:00 (EET)
  - Summer (DST): UTC+03:00 (EEST)
- Postal index: 87000-87062
- Area code: +380 6246
- Website: https://volodarskoe-r897.gosweb.gosuslugi.ru/ (Russian administered)

Nikolske Raion (Ukrainian: Нікольський район), until May 2016 Volodarske Raion (Ukrainian: Володарський район), was one of the raions of Donetsk Oblast, located in southwestern Ukraine. The administrative center of the raion was the urban-type settlement of Nikolske. The raion was abolished on 18 July 2020 as part of the administrative reform of Ukraine, which reduced the number of raions of Donetsk Oblast to eight, of which only five were controlled by the government. The area of the former Nikolske Raion was merged into Mariupol Raion. The last estimate of the raion population was 27,337 (2020 est.).

On 21 May 2016, Verkhovna Rada adopted decision to rename Volodarske Raion to Nikolske Raion according to the law prohibiting names of Communist origin. The raion center, Volodarske, was previously renamed to Nikolske.

== Population ==
Ethnic groups in the raion, according to the 2001 Ukrainian Census:

Ethnicity	Number	Proportion
Ukrainians	16,494	52.9%
Russians	7,538	24.2%
Greeks	6,223	20.0%
Belarusians	233	0.7%
