= Pokrovske, Mariupol Raion, Donetsk Oblast =

Pokrovske Покровське
- Village
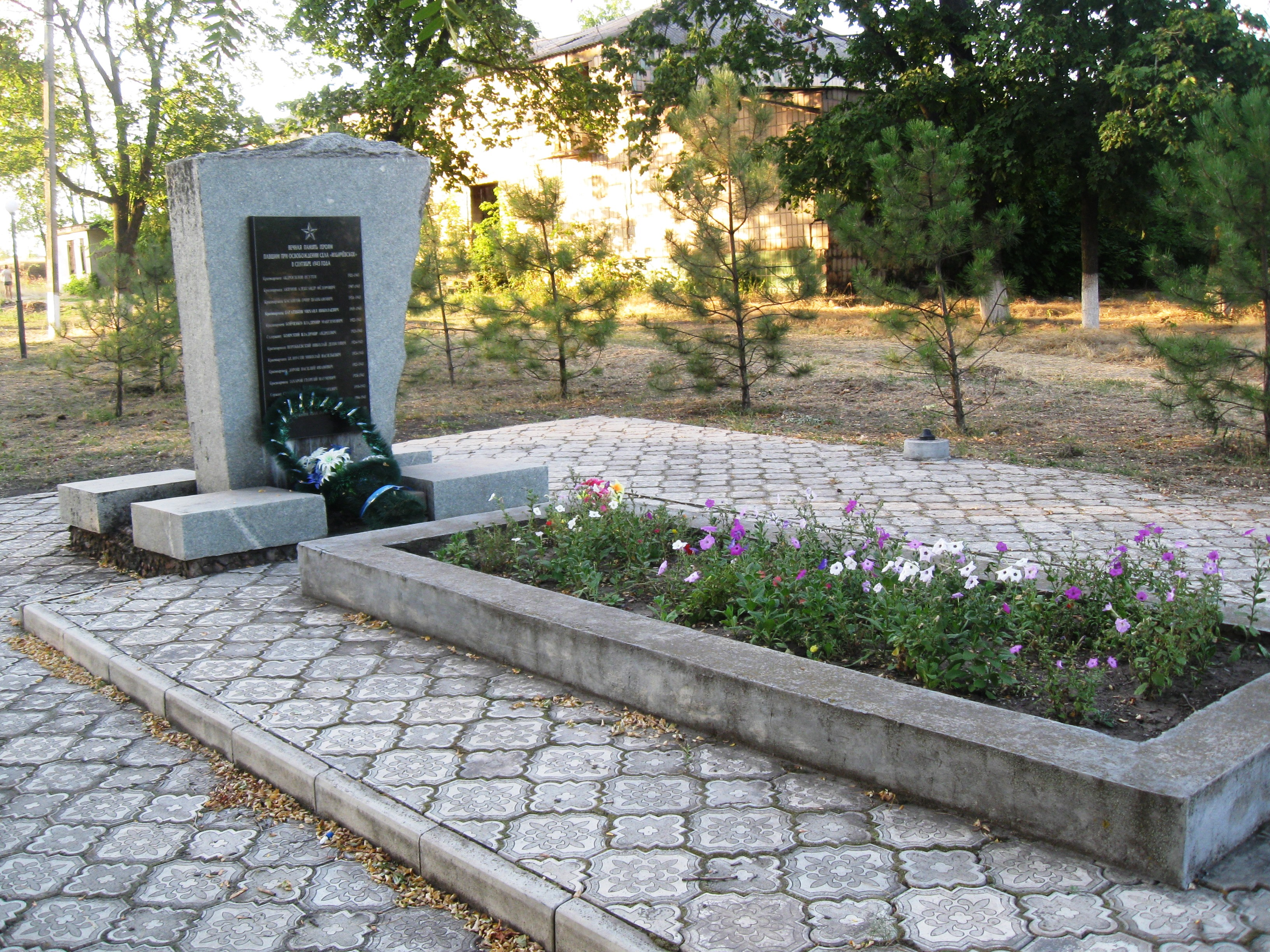

- Location of Pokrovske Pokrovske (Ukraine)
- Coordinates: 47°3′1″N 37°27′57″E
- Country: Ukraine
- Oblast: Donetsk Oblast
- Raion: Mariupol Raion
- Hromada: Mariupol urban hromada
- Elevation: 59 m (194 ft)

Population (2001)
  - Total: 1,383
- Time zone: UTC+2 (EET)
  - Summer (DST): UTC+3 (EEST)
- Postal code: 87440
- Area code: +380 6297
- Climate: Dfa

Pokrovske (Ukrainian: Покровське) is a village (a selo) in the Mariupol Raion (district) of Donetsk Oblast in eastern Ukraine.

== History ==
Pokrovske was known as Samaryna Balka (Ukrainian: Самарина Балка) until 1945 and from 1945 to 2016 as Illichivske (Ukrainian: Іллічівське). It was given its current name in 2016 as part of decommunization in Ukraine.

Until 18 July 2020, Pokrovske belonged to Manhush Raion. The raion was abolished that day as part of the administrative reform of Ukraine, which reduced the number of raions of Donetsk Oblast to eight, of which only five were controlled by the government. The Manhush Raion was merged into Mariupol Raion.

== Demographics ==
Native language as of the Ukrainian Census of 2001:

- Ukrainian: 26.97%
- Russian: 72.74%
- Belarusian: 0.07%
