= Zaichenko =

Zaichenko Заїченко
- Village
- Location of Zaichenko within Ukraine
- Coordinates: 47.182778°N 37.859444°E
- Country: Ukraine
- Oblast: Donetsk Oblast
- Raion: Mariupol Raion
- Hromada: Sartana settlement hromada
- Elevation: 55 m (180 ft)

Population (2001 census)
  - Total: 311
- Time zone: UTC+2 (EET)
  - Summer (DST): UTC+3 (EEST)
- Postal code: 87611
- Area code: +380 6296

Zaichenko (Ukrainian: Заїченко) is a village in Mariupol Raion (district) in Donetsk Oblast of eastern Ukraine, at 89.7 km SSE from the centre of Donetsk city, at 23.6 km SE from Volnovakha, at about 15 km east from Mariupol.

The settlement was taken under control of pro-Russian forces backed by Russian troops in August 2014, during the War in Donbas.

On 24 January 2015 Mariupol was targeted by multiple rocket launchers "Uragan" firing from the village.

== Demographics ==
In 2001 the settlement had 311 inhabitants. Native language as of the Ukrainian Census of 2001:

- Ukrainian: 16.08%
- Russian: 82.96%
