= Mykilske, Mariupol Raion, Donetsk Oblast =

Urban locality in Donetsk Oblast, Ukraine

Mykilske Микільське
- Rural settlement
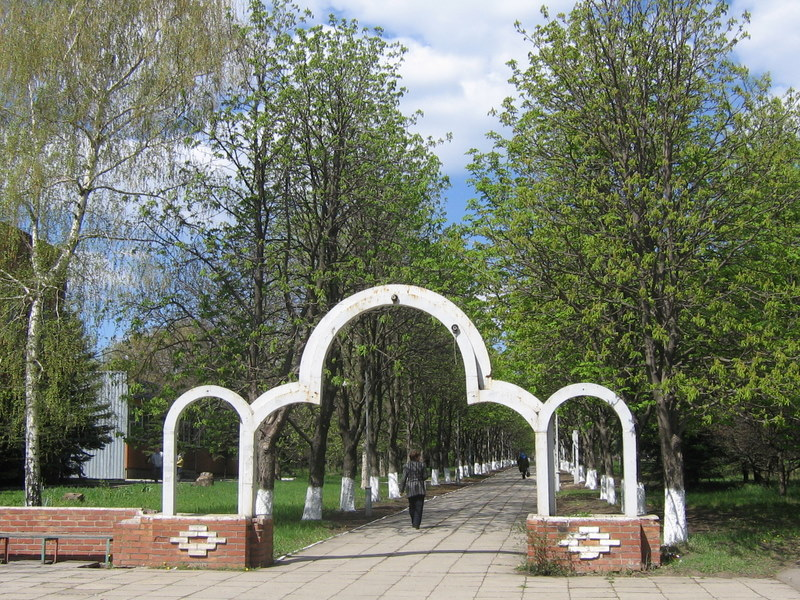
- Mykilske Park

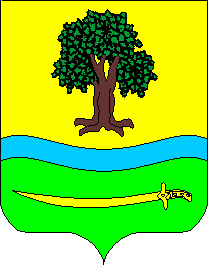
- Seal

- Location within Donetsk Oblast Location within Ukraine
- Country: Ukraine
- Oblast: Donetsk Oblast
- Raion: Mariupol Raion
- Hromada: Mykilske settlement hromada
- Founded: 1831

Government
  - Head of town council: Fedir Majshmaz
- Elevation: 131 m (430 ft)

Population (2022)
  - Total: 7,801
- Time zone: UTC+2 (EET)
  - Summer (DST): UTC+3 (EEST)
- Postal code: 87000—87004
- Area code: +380 6246

Mykilske (Ukrainian: Микільське), formerly known as Volodarske from 1923 to 2016, and as Nikolske until 2024, (Note: Ukrainian: Нікольське) is a rural settlement in Donetsk Oblast, eastern Ukraine. It is located in the industrial region of the Donets Basin. It was the administrative seat of Nikolske Raion until 2020; the settlement now belongs to Mariupol Raion. Population: 7,801 (2022 estimate).

== History ==
Its original name was Nikolske. After the October Revolution, it was changed to Volodarske in 1923 after V. Volodarsky, a Bolshevik. On February 18, 2016, as part of decommunization laws, the settlement was returned to the founding name of Nikolske.

The town was captured by Russia and annexed into the Donetsk People's Republic during the 2022 Russian invasion of Ukraine, and the occupation authorities changed its name back to Volodarske on May 4, 2022.

== Gallery ==
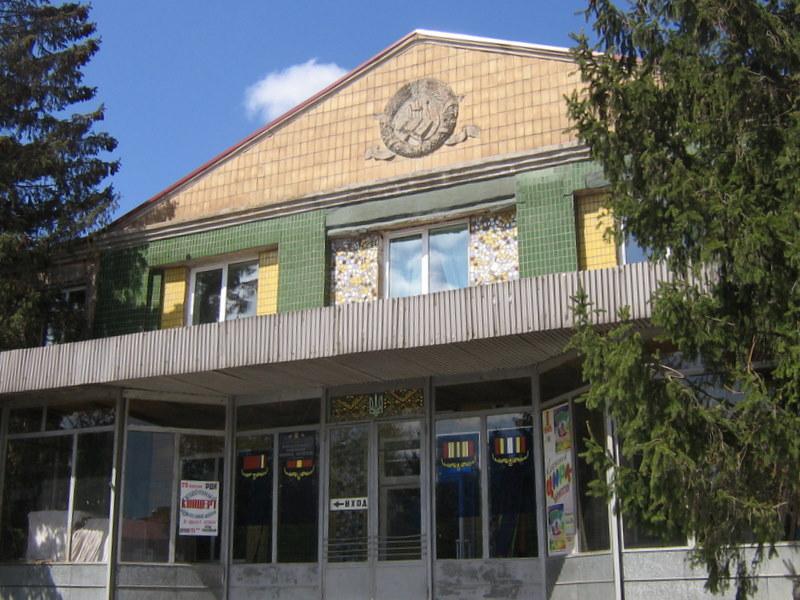
House of culture

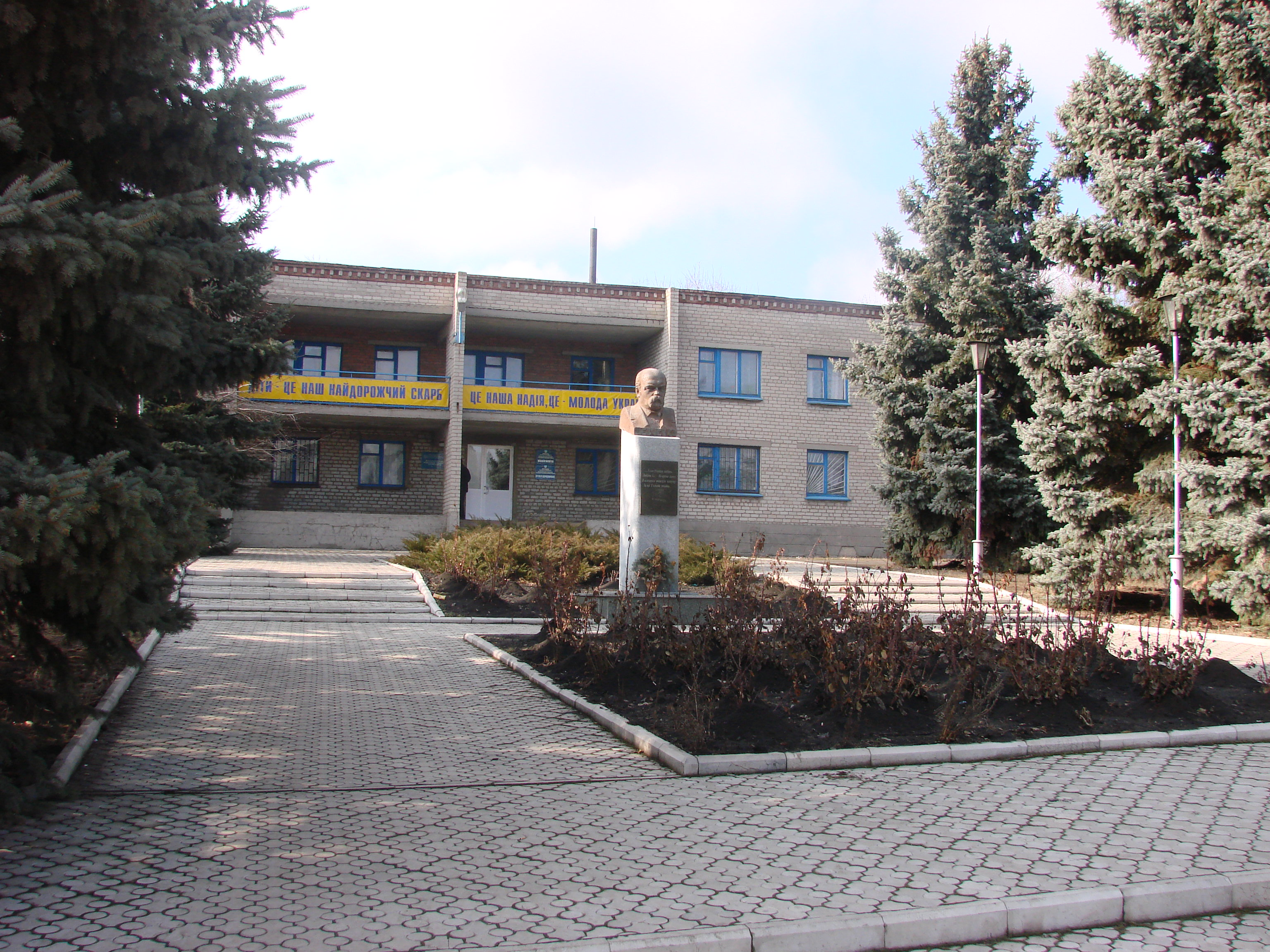
Education department and Taras Shevchenko monument
