= Mykilske settlement hromada =

Mykilske settlement hromada Микільська селищна громада
- Hromada
- Interactive map of Mykilske settlement hromada
- Country: Ukraine
- Oblast: Donetsk Oblast
- Raion: Mariupol Raion

Area
  - Total: 784.7 km^{2} (303.0 sq mi)

Population (2020)
  - Total: 16,999
  - Density: 21.66/km^{2} (56.11/sq mi)
- Settlements: 27
- Rural settlements: 2
- Villages: 25

Mykilske settlement hromada (Ukrainian: Микільська селищна громада) is a hromada of Ukraine, located in Mariupol Raion, Donetsk Oblast. Its administrative center is the rural settlement of Mykilske.

It has an area of 784.7 square kilometres (303.0 mi^{2}) and a population of 16,999, as of 2020.

On 26 November 2025, the Cabinet of Ministers of Ukraine approved the renaming of the Nikolske urban hromada to Mykilske urban hromada due to the renaming of the administrative center a year earlier.

The hromada includes 27 settlements: 2 rural settlements (Mykilske and Lisne), 25 villages:

- Berhtal
- Domakha
- Fedorivka
- Kalchynivka
- Krynychne
- Ksenivka
- Luhove
- Malynivka
- Nazarivka
- Novohryhorivka
- Novoianysol
- Novoromanivka
- Pannivka
- Sadove
- Serhiivka
- Shevchenko
- Stepove
- Suzhenka
- Sviato-Pokrovske
- Temriuk
- Topolyne
- Ukrainka
- Vesele
- Yamburh
- Zelenyi Yar

== See also ==
- List of hromadas of Ukraine
