= Sartana settlement hromada =

Sartana settlement hromada Сартанська селищна громада
- Hromada
- Interactive map of Sartana settlement hromada
- Country: Ukraine
- Oblast: Donetsk Oblast
- Raion: Mariupol Raion

Area
  - Total: 396.3 km^{2} (153.0 sq mi)

Population (2020)
  - Total: 20,736
  - Density: 52.32/km^{2} (135.5/sq mi)
- Settlements: 18
- Rural settlements: 2
- Villages: 14
- Towns: 2

Sartana settlement hromada (Ukrainian: Сартанська селищна громада) is a hromada of Ukraine, located in Mariupol Raion, Donetsk Oblast. Its administrative center is the town of Sartana.

It has an area of 396.3 square kilometres (153.0 mi^{2}) and a population of 20,736, as of 2020.

The hromada includes 18 settlements: 4 rural settlements (Sartana, Talakivka, Kalynivka, and Lomakyne), 14 villages:

- Berdianske
- Vodiane
- Hnutove
- Zaichenko
- Lebedynske
- Orlovske
- Pavlopil
- Kalmiuske
- Pikuzy
- Sopyne
- Fedorivka
- Chermalyk
- Chernenko
- Shyrokyne

== See also ==
- List of hromadas of Ukraine
