= Chermalyk =

Chermalyk Чермалик
- Village
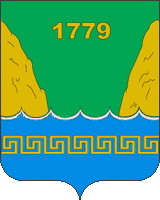
- Coat of arms

- Location within Donetsk Oblast Location within Ukraine
- Coordinates: 47°18′54″N 37°48′22″E
- Country: Ukraine
- Oblast: Donetsk Oblast
- Raion: Mariupol Raion
- Hromada: Sartana settlement hromada
- Founded: 1779

Area
  - Total: 1.75 km^{2} (0.68 sq mi)
- Elevation: 70 m (230 ft)

Population (2001 census)
  - Total: 1,908
  - Density: 1,090/km^{2} (2,820/sq mi)
- Time zone: UTC+2 (EET)
  - Summer (DST): UTC+3 (EEST)
- Postal code: 87142
- Area code: +380 6279

Chermalyk (Ukrainian: Чермалик; Russian: Чермалык; Greek: Τσερμαλίκ) is a village in Mariupol Raion (district) in Donetsk Oblast (province) of eastern Ukraine, near the northern banks of the Sea of Azov. Chermalyk is situated at 39.3 km south from the centre of Donetsk city, in some 40 km from Mariupol on the left bank of the Kalmius river.

== Demographics ==
Native language as of the Ukrainian Census of 2001:

- Russian: 82.91%
- Ukrainian: 8.33%
- Greek (including Mariupol Greek and Urum): 8.54%
