= Mariupol urban hromada =

Mariupol urban hromada Маріупольська міська громада
- Hromada
- Interactive map of Mariupol urban hromada
- Country: Ukraine
- Oblast: Donetsk Oblast
- Raion: Mariupol Raion

Area
  - Total: 375.3 km^{2} (144.9 sq mi)

Population (2020)
  - Total: 441,489
  - Density: 1,176/km^{2} (3,047/sq mi)
- Settlements: 11
- Cities: 1
- Rural settlements: 1
- Villages: 8
- Towns: 1

Mariupol urban hromada (Ukrainian: Маріупольська міська громада) is a hromada of Ukraine, located in Mariupol Raion, Donetsk Oblast. Its administrative center is the city Mariupol.

It has an area of 375.3 square kilometres (144.9 mi^{2}) and a population of 441,489, as of 2020.

The hromada contains 11 settlements: 1 city (Mariupol), 1 urban-type settlement (Staryi Krym), 8 villages:

- Ahrobaza
- Berdianske
- Pokrovske
- Pryazovske
- Prymyske
- Chervone
- Shevchenko
- Shyroka Balka

And 1 rural-type settlement: Rybatske.

== See also ==
- List of hromadas of Ukraine
