= Staryi Krym, Donetsk Oblast =

Urban locality in Donetsk Oblast, Ukraine

Staryi Krym Старий Крим
- Rural settlement
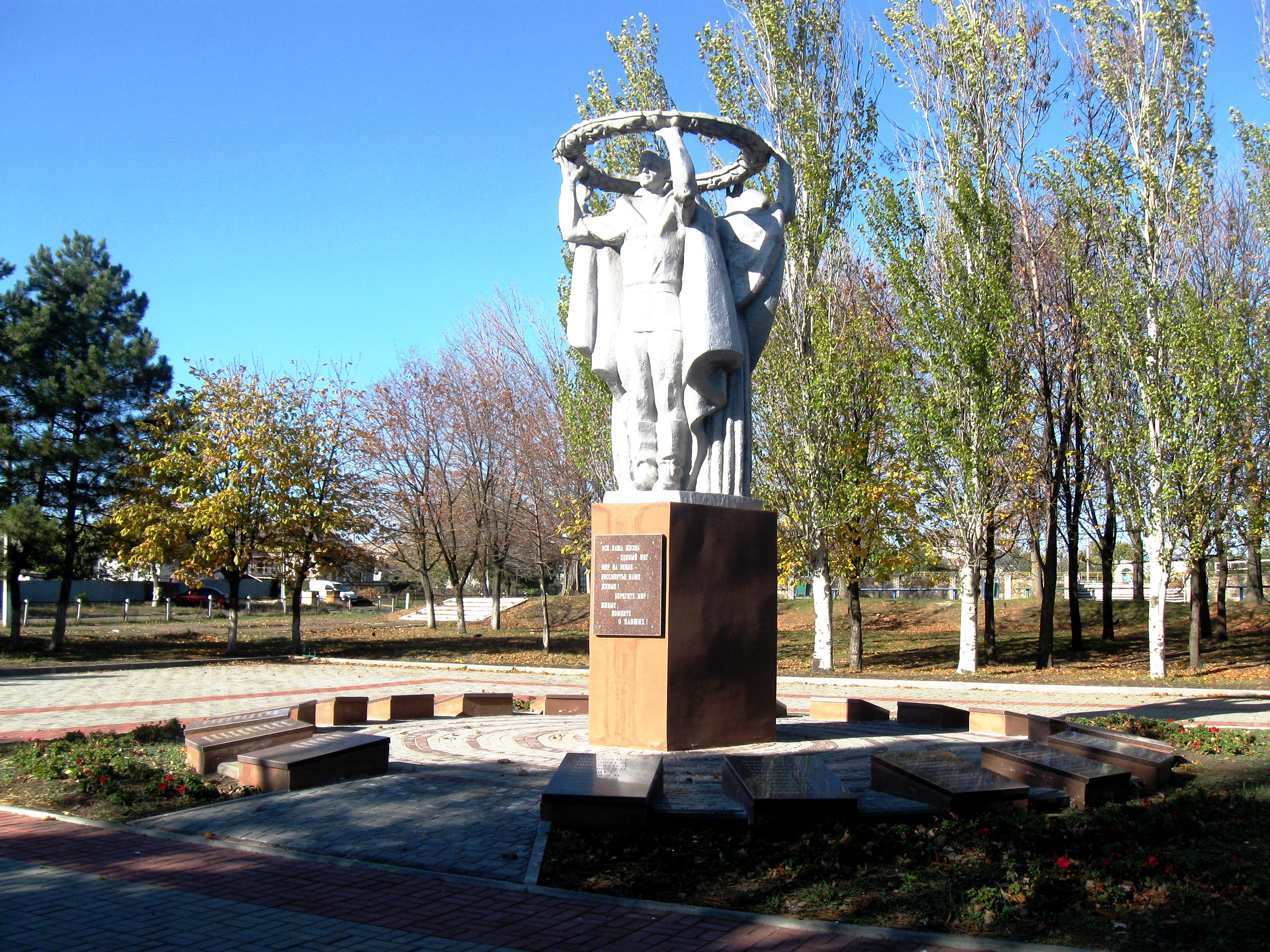

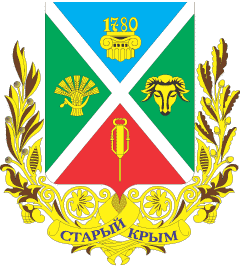
- Flag Coat of arms

- Location of Staryi Krym in Donetsk Oblast Staryi Krym (Donetsk Oblast)
- Coordinates: 47°09′35″N 37°29′13″E
- Country: Ukraine
- Oblast: Donetsk Oblast
- Raion: Mariupol Raion
- Hromada: Mariupol urban hromada
- Founded: 1780

Area
  - Total: 3.55 km^{2} (1.37 sq mi)
- Elevation: 39 m (128 ft)

Population (2022)
  - Total: 5,734
  - Density: 1,620/km^{2} (4,180/sq mi)
- Time zone: UTC+2 (EET)
  - Summer (DST): UTC+3 (EEST)
- Postal code: 87591
- Area code: +380 629

Staryi Krym (Ukrainian: Старий Крим) is a rural settlement in Mariupol Raion, Donetsk Oblast, eastern Ukraine. The settlement is about 7 km (4.3 mi) from the city of Mariupol, located on the right bank of the Kalchyk River. The population is 5,734 (2022 estimate).

The settlement was founded by Crimean Greeks after their forced resettlement from the peninsula in the 18th century, and its eponym is the city of the same name in Crimea.
