= Lebedynske, Mariupol Raion, Donetsk Oblast =

Lebedynske Лебединське
- Village
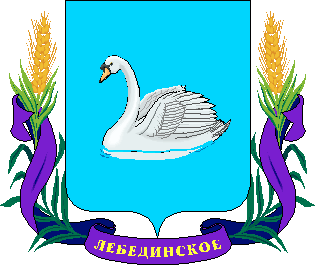
- Coat of arms

- Location of Lebedynske within Ukraine Lebedynske (Ukraine)
- Coordinates: 47°7′37″N 37°45′17″E
- Country: Ukraine
- Oblast: Donetsk Oblast
- Raion: Mariupol Raion
- Hromada: Sartana settlement hromada
- Elevation: 106 m (348 ft)

Population (2001 census)
  - Total: 718
- Time zone: UTC+2 (EET)
  - Summer (DST): UTC+3 (EEST)
- Postal code: 87640
- Area code: +380 6296

Lebedynske (Ukrainian: Лебединське; Russian: Лебединское) is a village in Mariupol Raion (district) in Donetsk Oblast of eastern Ukraine, at 127 km south from the centre of Donetsk city.

During the War in Donbas, that started in 2014, the village was taken under control of pro-Russian forces. Ukrainian forces drove pro-Russian troops out of the village on 10 February 2015.

== Demographics ==
Native language as of the Ukrainian Census of 2001:

- Ukrainian — 35.38%
- Russian — 63.93%
- Moldovan — 0.28%
- Belarusian — 0.14%
