= Pikuzy =

Village in Donetsk Oblast, Ukraine

Pikuzy Пікузи
- Village
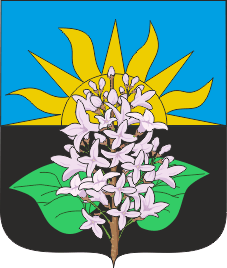
- Coat of arms
- Interactive map of Pikuzy
- Location of Pikuzy within Ukraine Pikuzy (Donetsk Oblast)
- Coordinates: 47°10′32″N 37°49′8″E
- Country: Ukraine
- Oblast: Donetsk Oblast
- Raion: Mariupol Raion
- Hromada: Sartana settlement hromada
- Elevation: 78 m (256 ft)

Population (2001 census)
  - Total: 606
- Time zone: UTC+2 (EET)
  - Summer (DST): UTC+3 (EEST)
- Postal code: 87611
- Area code: +380 6296
- Climate: Dfa

Pikuzy (Ukrainian: Пікузи; Russian: Пикузы), also called Kominternove, is a village in Mariupol Raion (district) in Donetsk Oblast of eastern Ukraine, at about 23 km ENE from Mariupol and at about the same distance WNW from Novoazovsk.

The War in Donbas (2014–2022) had both civilian and military casualties. As of 15 October 2015 the village was reportedly in a so-called "grey zone". Since 22 December 2015 it has been controlled by the self-proclaimed Donetsk People's Republic (DPR). On 1 October 2017 residents of Pikuzy gave the observers of the OSCE mission in Ukraine a letter also addressed to the United Nations and the Red Cross requesting for the immediate withdrawal of the DPR's armed men and of weapons from residential areas of the village.

== Demographics ==
Native language as of the Ukrainian Census of 2001:

- Ukrainian: 30.20%
- Russian: 69.14%
- Bulgarian: 0.33%
