= Vodiane, Mariupol Raion, Donetsk Oblast =

Vodiane Водяне
- Village
- Interactive map of Vodiane
- Location of Vodiane within Ukraine Vodiane (Ukraine)
- Coordinates: 47°8′57″N 37°47′14″E
- Country: Ukraine
- Oblast: Donetsk Oblast
- Raion: Mariupol Raion
- Hromada: Sartana settlement hromada
- Elevation: 93 m (305 ft)

Population (2001 census)
  - Total: 19
- Time zone: UTC+2 (EET)
  - Summer (DST): UTC+3 (EEST)
- Postal code: 87611
- Area code: +380 6296

Vodiane (Ukrainian: Водяне; Russian: Водяное) is a village in Mariupol Raion in Donetsk Oblast of Ukraine.

The war in Donbas, that started in mid-April 2014, brought both civilian and military casualties.

== Demographics ==
Native language as of the Ukrainian Census of 2001:

- Russian: 84.21%
- Ukrainian: 15.79%
