= Kalmiuske, Mariupol Raion, Donetsk Oblast =

Kalmiuske Кальміуське
- Village
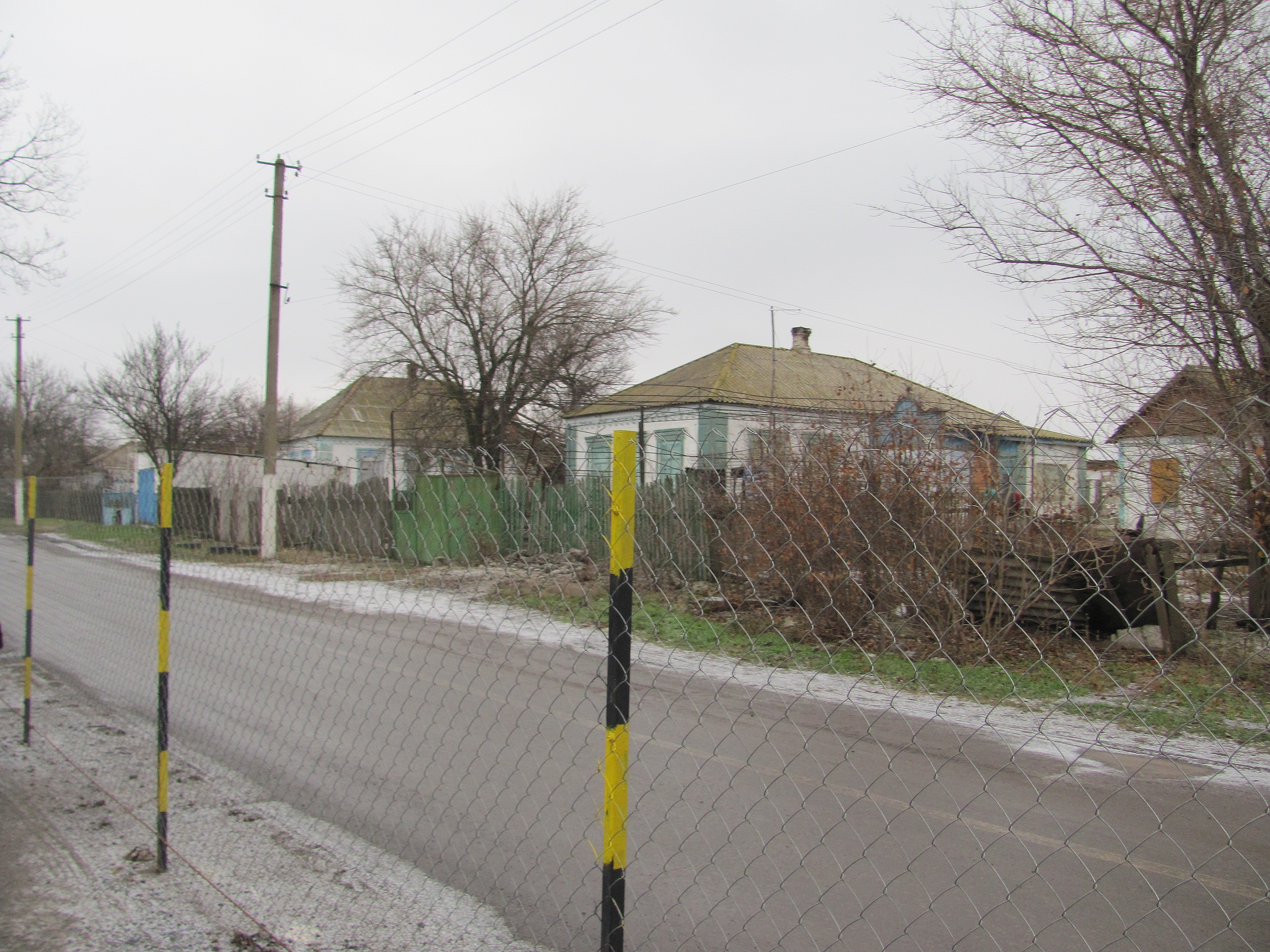

- Location of Kalmiuske within Ukraine Kalmiuske (Ukraine)
- Coordinates: 47.241944°N 37.794167°E
- Country: Ukraine
- Oblast: Donetsk Oblast
- Raion: Mariupol Raion
- Hromada: Sartana settlement hromada

Area
  - Total: 0.368 km^{2} (0.142 sq mi)
- Elevation: 32 m (105 ft)

Population (01.01.2017)
  - Total: 34
  - Density: 92/km^{2} (240/sq mi)
- Time zone: UTC+2 (EET)
  - Summer (DST): UTC+3 (EEST)
- Postal code: 87610
- Area code: +380 6296

Kalmiuske (Ukrainian: Кальміуське), formerly Pyshchevyk (Пищевик), is a village in Mariupol Raion (district) in Donetsk Oblast of eastern Ukraine, at about 117 km SSE from the centre of Donetsk city, on the left bank of the Kalmius River.

On 18 June 2025, the Verkhovna Rada renamed the village to Kalmiuske as part of the removal of placenames that do not match Ukrainian language standards.

== Demographics ==
The settlement had 41 inhabitants in 2001. Native language distribution as of the Ukrainian Census of 2001:

- Ukrainian: 80.49%
- Russian: 19.51%
