= Mala Seidemynukha =

Village in Kharkiv Oblast, Ukraine

Mala Seidemynukha Мала Сейдеминуха
- Village
- Interactive map of Mala Seidemynukha
- Mala Seidemynukha in Kherson Oblast Mala Seidemynukha (Ukraine)
- Coordinates: 47.132778°N 33.006944°E
- Country: Ukraine
- Oblast: Kherson Oblast
- Raion: Beryslav Raion

Area
  - Total: 0.4 km^{2} (0.15 sq mi)
- Elevation: 14 m (46 ft)

Population (2001 census)
  - Total: 245
  - Density: 610/km^{2} (1,600/sq mi)
- Time zone: UTC+2 (EET)
  - Summer (DST): UTC+3 (EEST)
- Postal code: 74101
- Area code: +380 5532

Mala Seidemynukha (Ukrainian: Мала Сейдеминуха; Russian: Малая Сейдеминуха) is a village in Beryslav Raion (district) in Kherson Oblast of southern Ukraine, at about 69.6 kilometres (43.2 mi) north-northeast from the centre of Kherson city, on the left bank of the Inhulets river. It belongs to Kalynivske settlement hromada, one of the hromadas of Ukraine.

== History ==
The village was formally part of a wider Jewish agricultural colony under the Russian Empire, which had the name Seidemynukha. It was founded in 1807, but due to overcrowding and disease, a new settlement was established called Mala Seidemynukha (hence the name "mala" or little). Most were from the Vitebsk Governorate (in present-day Belarus), and the colony had high grain yields, and many worked as artisans. However, with the Zionist youth movement HeHalutz emerging, many members of the colony emigrated to Mandatory Palestine in the 1920s, and in 1929 it was collectivized into the kolkhoz Avangard. Only a small number of Jewish residents survived the Holocaust, and in 1944 the village's original name, Mala Seidemynukha, was restored.

According to early records, the village was close to that of the village of Nagaratav, which led to some maps referring to them together as "Nagaratav and Seidemynukha". On 19 July 2020, as a result of administrative-territorial form and liquidation of the Velyka Oleksandrivka Raion, the village was incorporated into the Beryslav Raion.

The settlement came under attack by Russian forces during the Russian invasion of Ukraine in 2022.
