= Hnutove =

Hnutove Гнутове
- Village
- Interactive map of Hnutove
- Location of Hnutove within Ukraine Hnutove (Donetsk Oblast)
- Coordinates: 47°12′18″N 37°45′10″E
- Country: Ukraine
- Oblast: Donetsk Oblast
- Raion: Mariupol Raion
- Hromada: Sartana settlement hromada

Area
  - Total: 0.84 km^{2} (0.32 sq mi)
- Elevation: 18 m (59 ft)

Population (1 January 2011)
  - Total: 699
  - Density: 830/km^{2} (2,200/sq mi)
- Time zone: UTC+2 (EET)
  - Summer (DST): UTC+3 (EEST)
- Postal code: 87594
- Area code: +380 629

Hnutove (Ukrainian: Гнутове; Russian: Гнутово) is a village in Donetsk Oblast of eastern Ukraine, at 23,2 km northeast from the centre of Mariupol.

The village is situated on the left bank of the Kalmius river that became the boundary between Donetsk People's Republic-controlled territory on the east bank of the river, and Ukrainian government-controlled territory on the west bank, after an offensive by the pro-Russian forces of the Donetsk People's Republic in August 2014 during the war in Donbas.

The village was the location of the 2017 documentary The Distant Barking of Dogs. The family documented in the film subsequently fled following the full-scale Russia's invasion. Since 2022 and as of 2024, Hnutove is under Russian occupation.

== Demographics ==
Population
1873	1989	2001	2011
179	665	813	699
