= Novozvanivka =

Novozvanivka Новозванівка
- Village
- Interactive map of Novozvanivka
- Location of Novozvanivka within Ukraine Novozvanivka (Ukraine)
- Coordinates: 48°34′59″N 38°21′22″E
- Country: Ukraine
- Oblast: Luhansk Oblast
- Raion: Sievierodonetsk Raion
- Founded: 1890

Area
  - Total: 1.825 km^{2} (0.705 sq mi)
- Elevation: 149 m (489 ft)

Population (2001 census)
  - Total: 168
  - Density: 92.1/km^{2} (238/sq mi)
- Time zone: UTC+2 (EET)
  - Summer (DST): UTC+3 (EEST)
- Postal code: 93309
- Area code: +380 6474

Novozvanivka (Ukrainian: Новозванівка; Russian: Новозвановка) is a village in Sievierodonetsk Raion (district) in Luhansk Oblast of eastern Ukraine. On May 16, 2022, the Luhansk People's Republic militia took control over the village from the Ukrainian Armed Forces.

== Demographics ==
Native language as of the Ukrainian Census of 2001:

- Ukrainian 77.38%
- Russian 22.02%
