= Talakivka =

Urban locality in Donetsk Oblast, Ukraine

Talakivka Талаківка
- Rural settlement
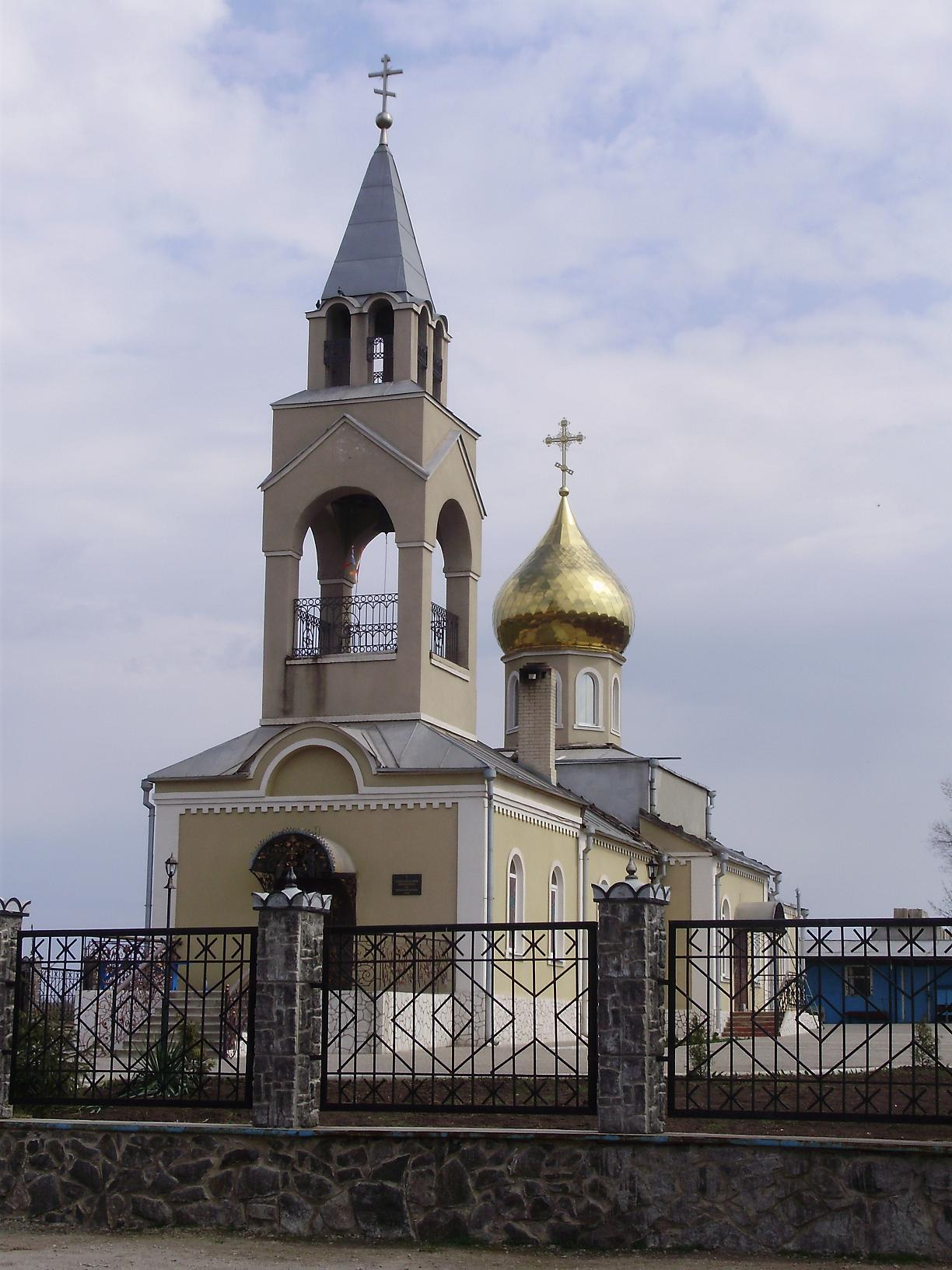

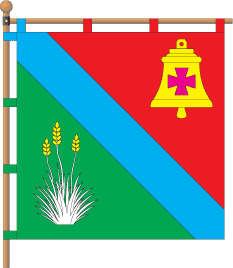
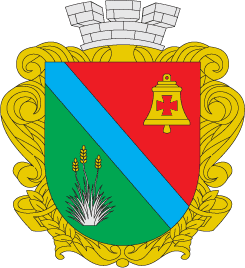
- Flag Coat of arms

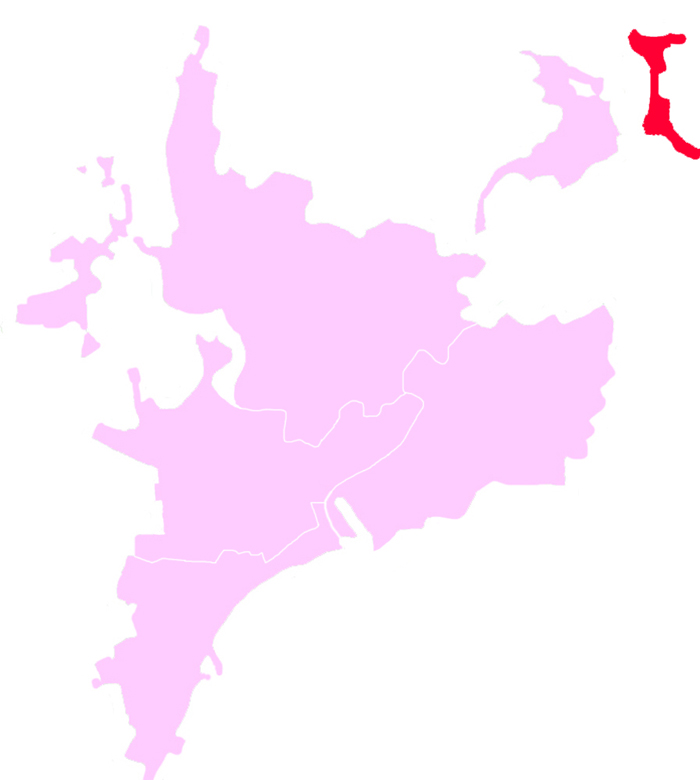
- Talakivka is marked with dark red

- Location of Talakivka within Ukraine Talakivka (Donetsk Oblast)
- Coordinates: 47°11′7″N 37°43′19″E
- Country: Ukraine
- Oblast: Donetsk Oblast
- Raion: Mariupol Raion
- Hromada: Sartana settlement hromada
- Founded: 1889

Area
  - Total: 2.39 km^{2} (0.92 sq mi)
- Elevation: 6 m (20 ft)

Population (2022)
  - Total: 3,832
  - Density: 1,600/km^{2} (4,150/sq mi)
- Time zone: UTC+2 (EET)
  - Summer (DST): UTC+3 (EEST)
- Postal code: 87594-87595
- Area code: +380 629

Talakivka (Ukrainian: Талаківка; Russian: Талаковка) is a rural settlement in Mariupol Raion, Donetsk Oblast, eastern Ukraine. It is located 89.4 kilometres (55.6 mi) south-southwest from the centre of Donetsk city, at a distance of 19 kilometres (12 mi) north from the centre of Mariupol, on the right bank of the Kalmius River. Population: 3,832 (2022 estimate).

== Demographics ==
In 2001 the settlement had a population of 4160. Native language as of the Ukrainian Census of 2001:

- Ukrainian: 10.31%
- Russian: 89.47%
- Greek (including Mariupol Greek and Urum): 0.10%
- Belarusian: 0.07%

Dynamics of population has been as follows:

Year	Population
1897	652
1959	2886
1970	3574
1979	4502
1987	4600
1988	4600
1989	3848
1992	3900
1998	3800
2001	4160
2004	4100
2009	4160
2010	4155
2011	4129
2012	4137
2013	4130
2014	4133
2015	4113
