= Shyrokyne =

Shyrokyne Широкине
- Village
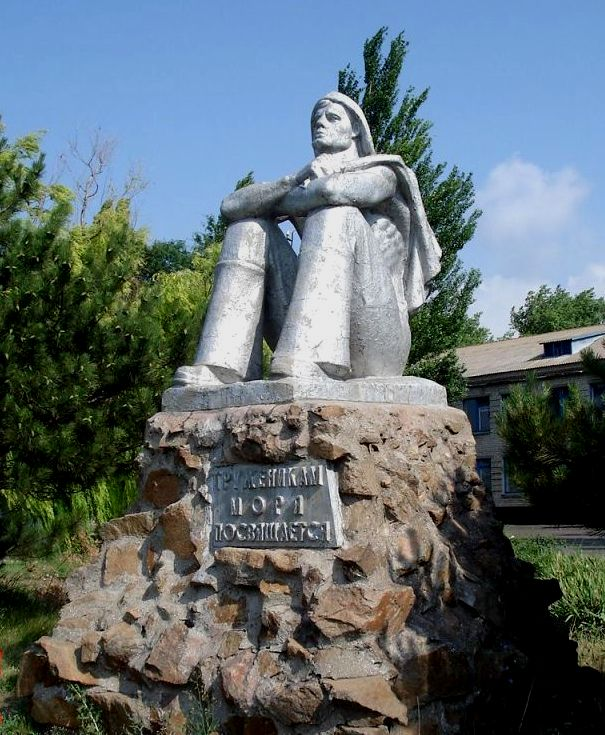

- Location of Shyrokyne in Donetsk Oblast Shyrokyne (Ukraine)
- Coordinates: 47°5′53″N 37°48′37″E
- Country: Ukraine
- Oblast: Donetsk Oblast
- Raion: Mariupol Raion
- Hromada: Sartana settlement hromada
- Elevation: 4 m (13 ft)

Population (2001 census)
  - Total: 1,411
- Time zone: UTC+2 (EET)
  - Summer (DST): UTC+3 (EEST)
- Postal code: 87650
- Area code: +380 6296

Shyrokyne (Ukrainian: Широкине, pronounced [ʃɪˈrɔkɪne]); (Russian: Широкино, romanized: Shirokino) is a village in the Mariupol Raion of Donetsk Oblast, Ukraine.

The village is situated on the shore of the Sea of Azov, about 23 kilometres (14 mi) east from the centre of Mariupol.

== War in Donbas ==
The village became a battleground in 2014–15 during the war in Donbas.

Prior to the war, the village was situated in Novoazovsk Raion. This was changed on 9 December 2014, when the Ukrainian parliament voted to change the boundaries of the Raion, so as to allow Ukrainian-controlled territories to be separated from DPR-controlled territories. The village and its neighbours were thus placed into an expanded Volnovakha Raion.

All civilians were evacuated from the village in February 2015, with up to 80% of the village's houses damaged beyond repair by July of that year.

By the end of February 2016 Ukrainian troops took the village under their control as pro-Russian forces withdrew from the settlement.

As of 2023, Shyrokyne is under administration by Russian forces, who have de facto annexed Donetsk Oblast.

== Demographics ==
As of the 2001 Ukrainian census, the settlement had a population of 1,411 people, of whom the majority claimed to be Ukrainophone, when they were asked about their primary languages. The exact native language composition was as follows:

Native languages in Shyrokyne
	percent
Ukrainian	60.3%
Russian	39.4%
Greek^{1}	0.1%
Moldovan^{2}	0.1%
others	0.1%

^{1} Including Mariupol Greek and Urum
^{2} Alternative name of the Romanian language
