= Pavlopil =

Pavlopil Павлопіль
- Village
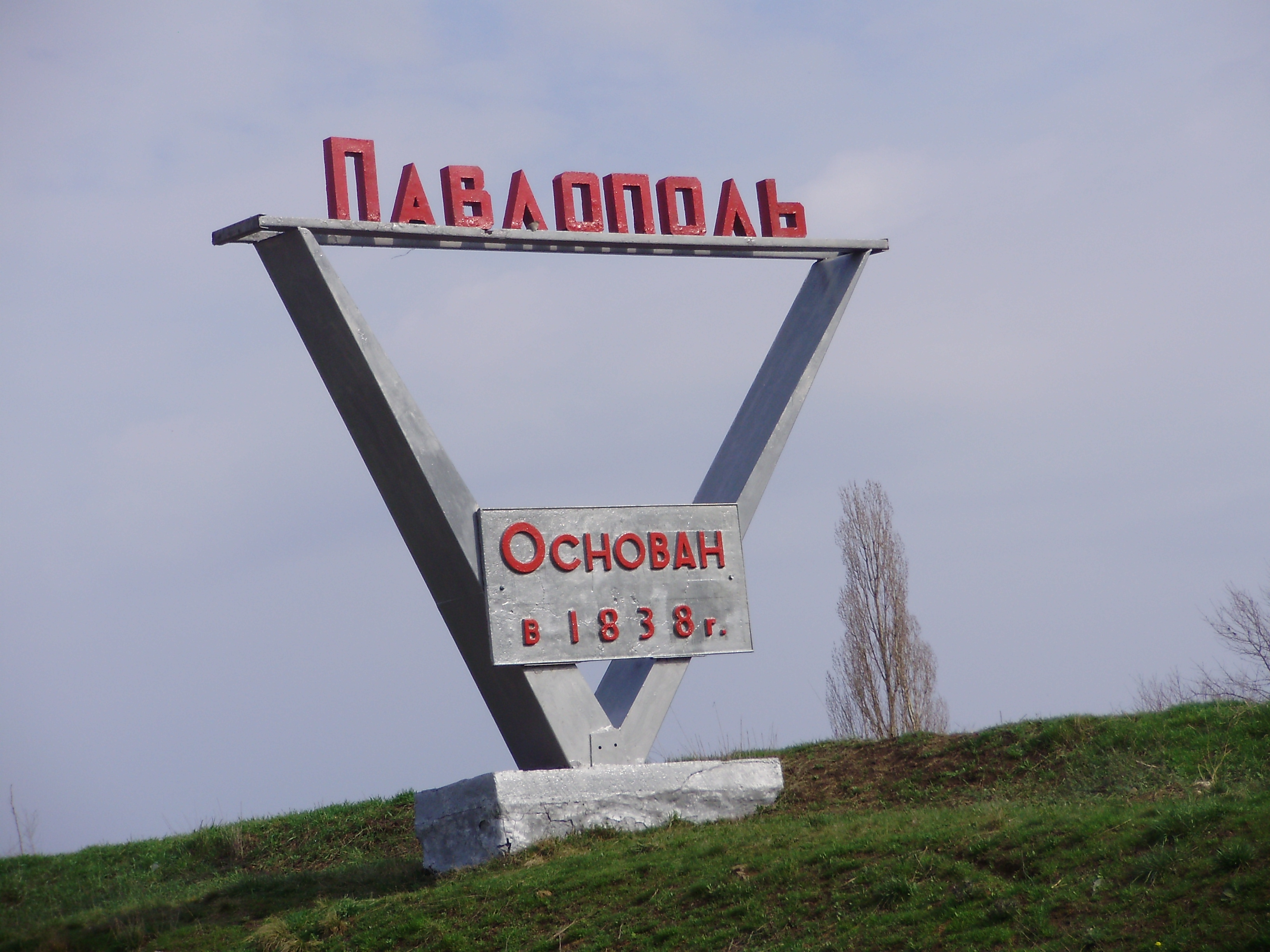
- Sign at the entry

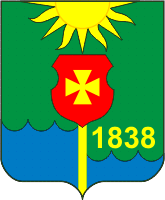
- Seal
- Interactive map of Pavlopil
- Location of Pavlopil within Ukraine Pavlopil (Donetsk Oblast)
- Coordinates: 47°15′38″N 37°46′58″E
- Country: Ukraine
- Oblast: Donetsk Oblast
- Raion: Mariupol Raion
- Hromada: Sartana settlement hromada
- Founded: 1834
- Elevation: 45 m (148 ft)

Population (2001 census)
  - Total: 624
- Time zone: UTC+2 (EET)
  - Summer (DST): UTC+3 (EEST)
- Postal code: 87610
- Area code: +380 6296

Pavlopil (Ukrainian: Павлопіль; Russian: Павлополь) is a village in Mariupol Raion (district) in Donetsk Oblast of eastern Ukraine, at about 25 km NW from Novoazovsk and about 25 km NE from Mariupol, on the left bank of the Kalmius river.

The War in Donbas, that started in April 2014, brought along both civilian and military casualties. In May 2016, a male civilian was killed and another injured when a tractor they were driving on hit an unidentified explosive device.

From 2015, Ukraine restored full control over the village. However, after the full-scale Russian invasion of Ukraine, the village was seized by Russian occupational forces in 2022.

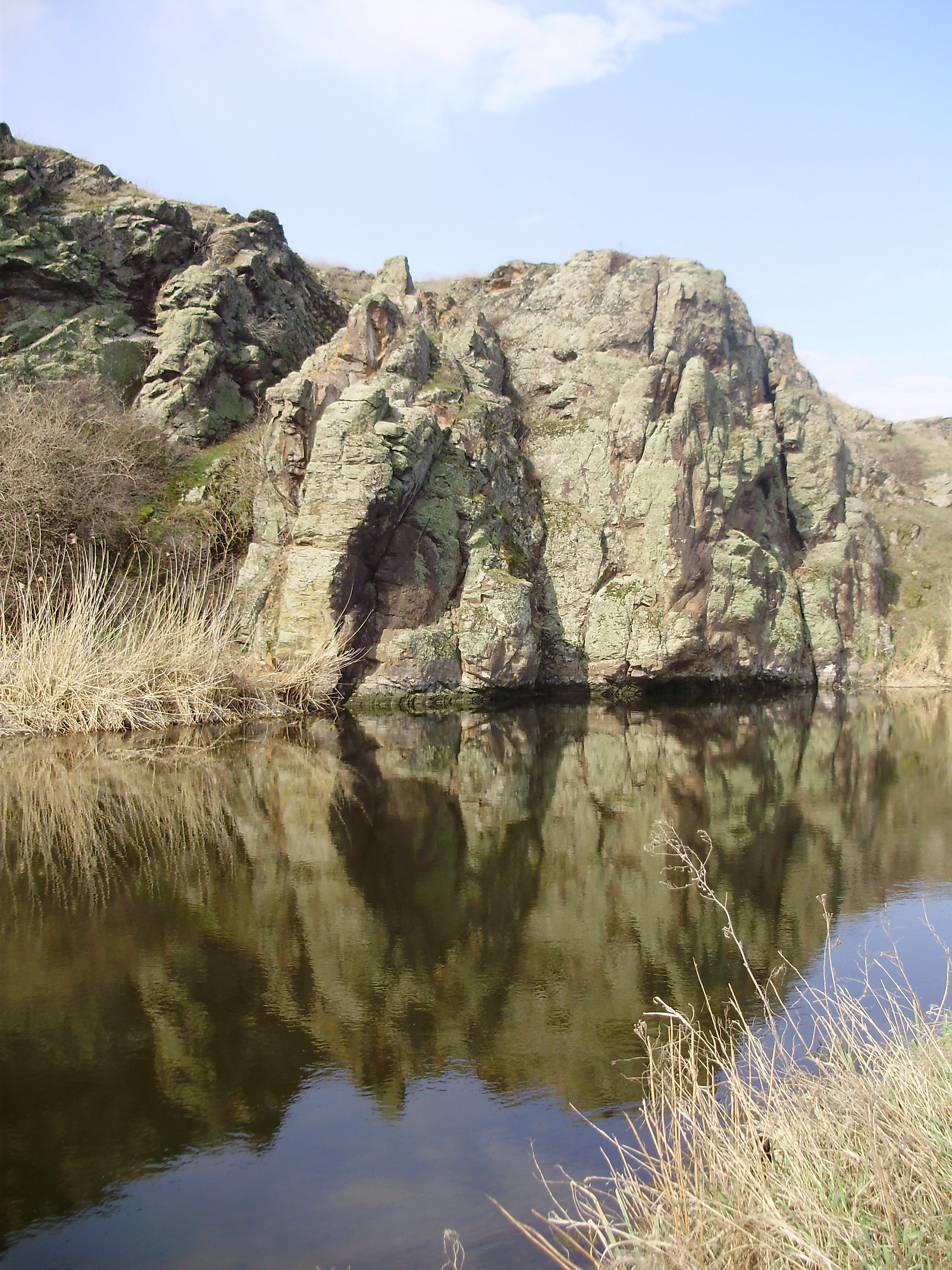
Kalmius

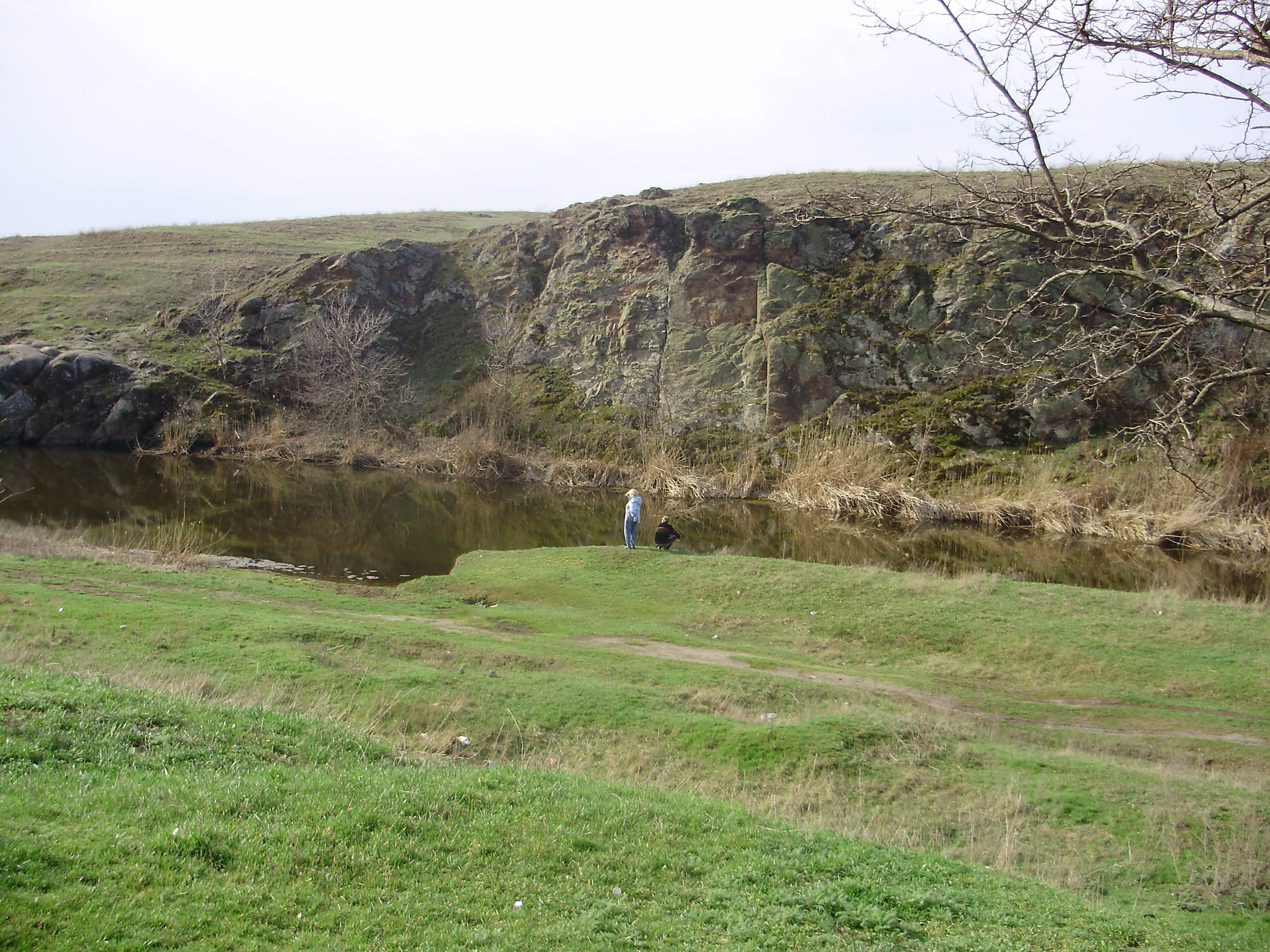

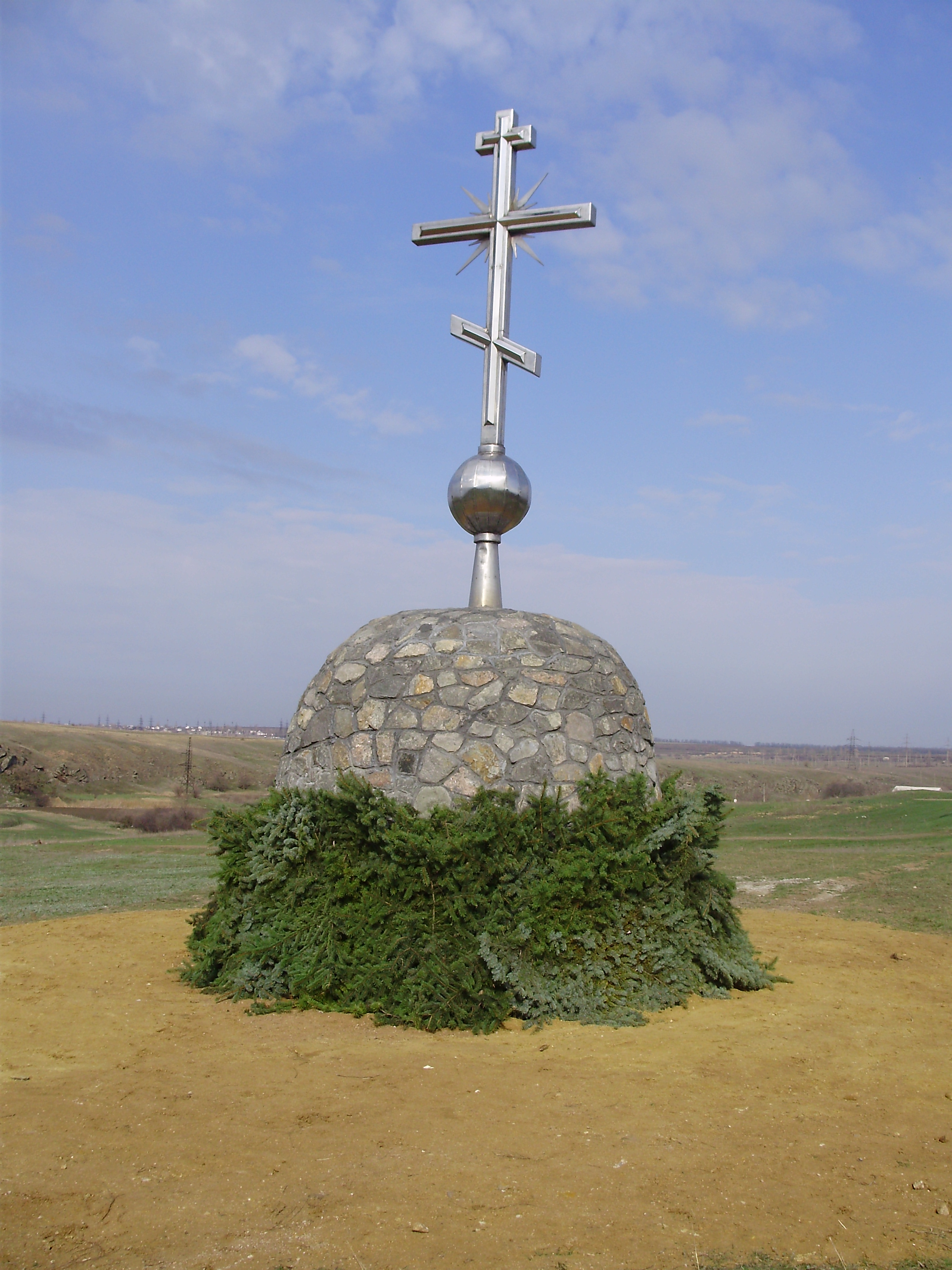

== Demographics ==
Native language as of the Ukrainian Census of 2001:

- Ukrainian – 72.60%
- Russian – 26.28%
- Armenian – 0.32%

Population
1873	1897	1970	1976	2001
505	651	660	615	624
