= Mariupol Raion =

Subdivision of Donetsk Oblast, Ukraine

Coordinates: 47°08′N 37°13′E

Mariupol Raion Маріупольський район
- Raion
- Interactive map of Mariupol Raion
- Country: Ukraine
- Oblast: Donetsk
- Established: 2020
- Seat: Mariupol
- Subdivisions: 5 hromadas

Area
  - Total: 2,620 km^{2} (1,010 sq mi)

Population (2022)
  - Total: 502,909
  - Density: 192/km^{2} (497/sq mi)

Mariupol Raion (Ukrainian: Маріупольський район, romanized: Mariupolskyi raion; Russian: Мариупольский район, romanized: Mariupolsky rayon) is a raion (district) of Donetsk Oblast, Ukraine.

== History ==
It was created in July 2020 as part of the reform of administrative divisions of Ukraine. The center of the raion is the city of Mariupol. Population: 502,909 (2022 estimate).

=== Russo-Ukrainian War ===
The area of the raion has been occupied by Russian troops since March 2022 during the Russian invasion of Ukraine; the occupation forces continue to use the older pre-2020 administrative divisions of Ukraine.

== Subdivisions ==
Raion consists of 5 hromadas:

- Kalchyk rural hromada
- Manhush settlement hromada
- Mariupol urban hromada
- Nikolske settlement hromada
- Sartana settlement hromada
