= Timeline of the war in Donbas (2019) =

- 2014; 2015; 2016; 2017; 2018; 2019; 2020; 2021; 2022

This is the timeline of the war in Donbas for the year 2019. More than 110 Ukrainian soldiers were killed in the conflict between Ukrainian government forces and Russian-backed separatists in 2019.

== January ==
- 1 January: The press-centre of the Joint Forces Operation (JFO) reported in the evening that by 6:00 pm two ceasefire violations had taken place. Hnutove, in the eastern area of operations, came under 82 mm mortar fire in the morning. In the afternoon, Novotoshkivske, in the northern front (at around 52 km WNW from Luhansk), Ukrainian redoubts were engaged by pro-Russian BMP-1 infantry fighting vehicles from Donetskyi; one Ukrainian serviceman was killed in action and two others wounded. Ukrainian forces returned fire, killing one pro-Russian soldier and wounding four.

== February ==
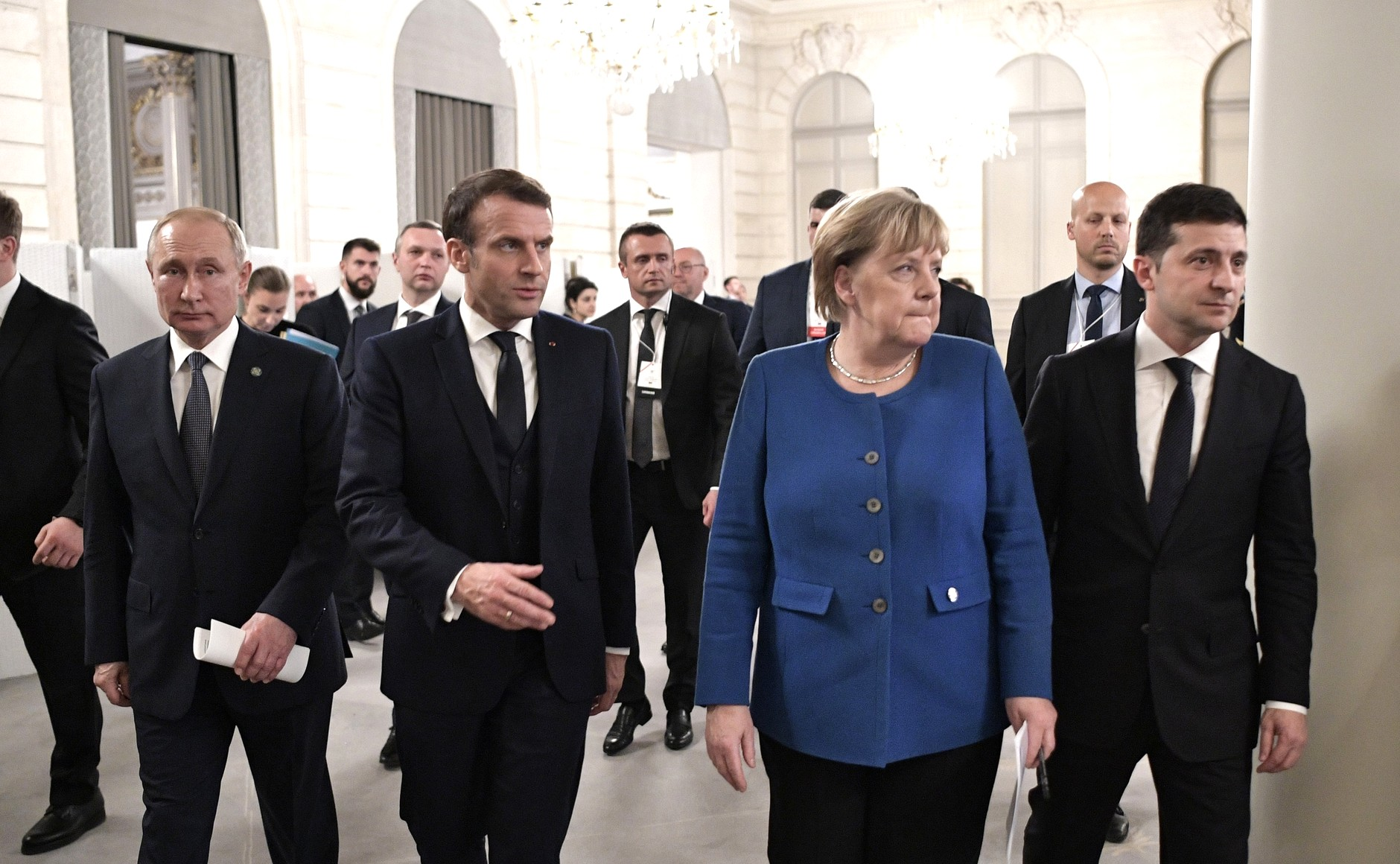
From left, Russian President Vladimir Putin, French President Emmanuel Macron, German Chancellor Angela Merkel and Ukrainian President Volodymyr Zelenskyy in Paris, France, December 2019

- 20 February: 7% of Ukraine's territory was classified by the Ukrainian government as temporarily occupied territories.

== March ==
- 7 March: the Trilateral Contact Group on Ukraine agreed on a new truce to start on 8 March 2019. Although Ukraine claimed that "Russian proxies" (the separatists) had violated it on the same day, fighting did die down, with the Ukrainian side stating that the ceasefire was fully observed from 10 March 2019.

== April ==
- 21 April: general elections were held in Ukraine. Servant of the People party's candidate Volodymyr Zelenskyy was elected president, winning a clear victory over incumbent president Petro Poroshenko with more than 70% support.
- 30 April: a total of twelve schools in Donbas had been attacked since January.

== May ==
- 7 May: Amid an escalation of hostilities, with 25 attacks on Ukrainian forces recorded by the Ukrainian Joint Forces, pro-Russian tanks from Kalynove exchanged fire with Ukrainian armoured fighting vehicles at Novozvanivka. The tanks were supported by heavy machine guns, 120 mm mortars, 122 mm self-propelled artillery and anti-tank guided missiles. Another clash took place at Popasna, where Ukrainian armoured fighting vehicles engaged pro-Russian armoured fighting vehicles from Kalynove-Borshchevate that were firing on their positions. The Ukrainian military claimed the destruction of two armoured fighting vehicles, an enemy bunker and the death of three pro-Russian fighters. A Ukrainian soldier was killed in action and three others wounded.
- 20 May: Volodymyr Zelenskyy took office as President of Ukraine. In his inaugural speech, Zelenskyy said that his priority was "a ceasefire in the Donbass". He also asserts that "Crimea and Donbass are Ukrainian land", and that the people living in those regions "are not strangers, they are ours, Ukrainians".
- 31 May: According to the Office of the United Nations High Commissioner for Human Rights, from February 15 to May 2019, it recorded forty-five civilian casualties in the Donbas region. Ten civilians were killed with thirty-five injured. The report noted that it was "a 181 per cent increase compared with the previous reporting period of 16 November 2018 to 15 February 2019 when 16 civilian casualties (two killed and 14 injured) were recorded."

== June ==
- 24 June: A total of 44 ceasefire violations were registered by the Ukrainian Joint Forces; four Ukrainian servicemen were wounded. In the eastern front, Vodiane was shelled with 122 mm self-propelled artillery. Avdiivka, Marinka and Vodiane were hit by 82 mm and 120 mm mortar volleys. Krasnohorivka, Pavlopil, Kamianka, Bohdanivka, Shyrokyne, Pisky, Chermalyk and Talakivka received fire from small arms, heavy machine guns, automatic grenade launchers, anti-tank rocket launchers and 73 mm anti-tank recoilless rifles. Ukrainian forces claimed to have destroyed a radar facility and the shooting down of a hostile drone. In the northern sector of operations, Yuzhne, Novhorodske and Novoluhanske came under the combined fire of 82 mm and 120 mm mortars. Novoluhanske also became the target of 122 mm self-propelled guns. Luhanske, Krymske and Kryakivka received fire from infantry weapons. Ukrainian forces returned fire, specially in the area of Yuzhne, where they employed grenade launchers and armoured fighting vehicles.
- 26 June: The spokesman of the Ukrainian operational headquarters reported in the morning that pro-Russian troops had opened fire on 39 occasions on Ukrainian positions, 13 of them using weapons banned by the Minsk agreements. Seven Ukrainian servicemen were wounded. In the eastern front, Pavlopil was shelled with 122 mm self-propelled artillery. Kamianka received the combined fire of 82 mm and 120 mm mortars. Avdiivka and Opytne were hit by 120 mm mortar barrages, while Novoselivka and Marinka came under 82 mm mortar fire. Pro-Russian armoured fighting vehicles engaged Ukrainian positions at Novoselivka. Shyrokyne, Starohnativka, Bohdanivka, Vodiane, Pisky, Talakivka and Krasnohorivka became the target of small arms, heavy machine guns, automatic grenade launchers, anti-tank rocket launchers and 73 mm anti-tank recoilless rifles. In the northern sector of operations, pro-Russian armoured fighting vehicles launched an attacked on Krymske supported by the combined fire of 82 mm and 120 mm mortars. Novoluhanske, Pivdenne and Zaitseve became the target of 82 mm mortars. Luhanske, Novoluhanske, Hladosove, Katerinivka and Travneve received fire from infantry weapons and different types of grenade launchers. OSCE monitors confirmed the beginning of the withdrawal of Ukrainian and pro-Russian troops and equipment from the area around Stanytsia Luhanska, Luhansk Oblast, in order to establish a disengagement zone agreed between the parties at Minsk.
- 29 June: A pro-Russian UR-77 vehicle in Oleksandrivka fired a mine-clearing line charge at a derelict building near Marinka, in the western outskirts of Donetsk city.

== July ==
- 10 July: The Ukrainian Joint Forces recorded 42 pro-Russian attacks on their positions. One Ukrainian soldier was killed in action and nine others were wounded. The Ukrainian army returned fire. In the eastern area of operations, Pro-Russian forces launched anti-tank guided missiles at Ukrainian positions around Hranitne. The separatists shelled Marinka, Kamianka, Novotroitske, Berezove, Pisky, Bohdanivka, Nikolaevka and Taramchuk with 82 mm and 120 mm mortars. Starohnativka, Pavlopil, Pisky, Shyrokyne, Krasnohorivka, Novotroitske, Vodiane, Berezove, Nikolaevka, Taramchuk, and Lebedinske received fire from infantry weapons, automatic grenade launchers, anti-tank rocket launchers, and 73 mm anti-tank recoilless rifles. On the northern front, Novoluhanske and Novotoshkivke were shelled by 122 mm self-propelled artillery from Dolomitne, Horlivka, and Holubivske. Krymske, Prichepilivka, Luhanske, Yuzhne, Zolote, Popasna, Novooleksandrivka, Novozvanivka, Vilnyi, Novoluhanske and Zaitseve were hit by 82 mm and 120 mm mortar volleys. Pro-Russian armored fighting vehicles engaged Ukrainian positions at Novoluhanske and Zolote, in the first case supported by ZU-23-2 anti-aircraft guns. Ukrainian troops at Yuzhne, Zolote, Popasna, Novozvanivka and Vilnyi became the target of small arms, heavy machine guns and grenade launchers.
- 17 July: "A new lasting ceasefire" from midnight on 21 July was agreed upon by the Trilateral Contact Group at Minsk.

== August ==
- 31 August: The press center of the Ukrainian Joint Forces reported 20 pro-Russian violations of the truce; one Ukrainian soldier was wounded in action. In the eastern front, pro-Russian forces attacked Vodiane employing infantry weapons, grenade launchers, 82 mm mortars and 122 mm self-propelled guns. Lebedinske was fired at from heavy machine guns and 82 mm mortars and Pavlopil from heavy machine guns and anti-tank rocket launchers. Ukrainian troops at Novohnativka were harassed with heavy machine gun fire. In the northern area of operations, pro-Russian armoured fighting vehicles engaged Ukrainian positions around Novoluhanske supported by small arms, heavy machine guns, automatic grenade launchers and 120 mm mortars. Troitske was hit by heavy machine gun fire, 82 mm mortar rounds and 120 mm mortar rounds. Luhansk, Shumy and Zaitseve received fire from anti-tank rocket launchers and 82 mm mortars. Small arms and heavy machine gun fire was also reported at Zaitseve and Shumy while Maisk became the target of heavy machine guns and anti-tank rocket launchers.

== September ==
- 25 September: The spokesman of the Ukrainian operational headquarters reported in the morning, that pro-Russian troops had opened fire on 32 occasions on Ukrainian positions; two Ukrainian servicemen were wounded. In the eastern area of operations, Ukrainian positions at Krasnohorivka received fire from infantry weapons, grenade launchers and 120 mm mortars. Marinka, meanwhile, became the target of small arms, heavy machine guns and 82 mm mortars. Pro-Russian armoured fighting vehicles from Uzhivka launched three attacks on Ukrainian positions at Vodiane. Pisky and Avdiivka came under small arms and anti-tank rocket fire. Novotroitske and Opytne were fired upon with automatic grenade launchers. Small arms fire was reported at Novohnativka. In the northern front, Novoluhanske, Travneve, Dolomitne, Svitlodarsk, Yuzhne and Zolote were attacked with infantry weapons, different grenade-launcher systems and 82 mm mortars. Luhanske received fire from 73 mm anti-tank recoilless rifles. Pro-Russian forces fired upon Ukrainian troops at Novotoshkivke with infantry weapons, anti-tank rocket launchers and 73 mm anti-tank recoilless rifles. Ukrainian troops at Zaitseve were harassed with small arms fire.

== October ==
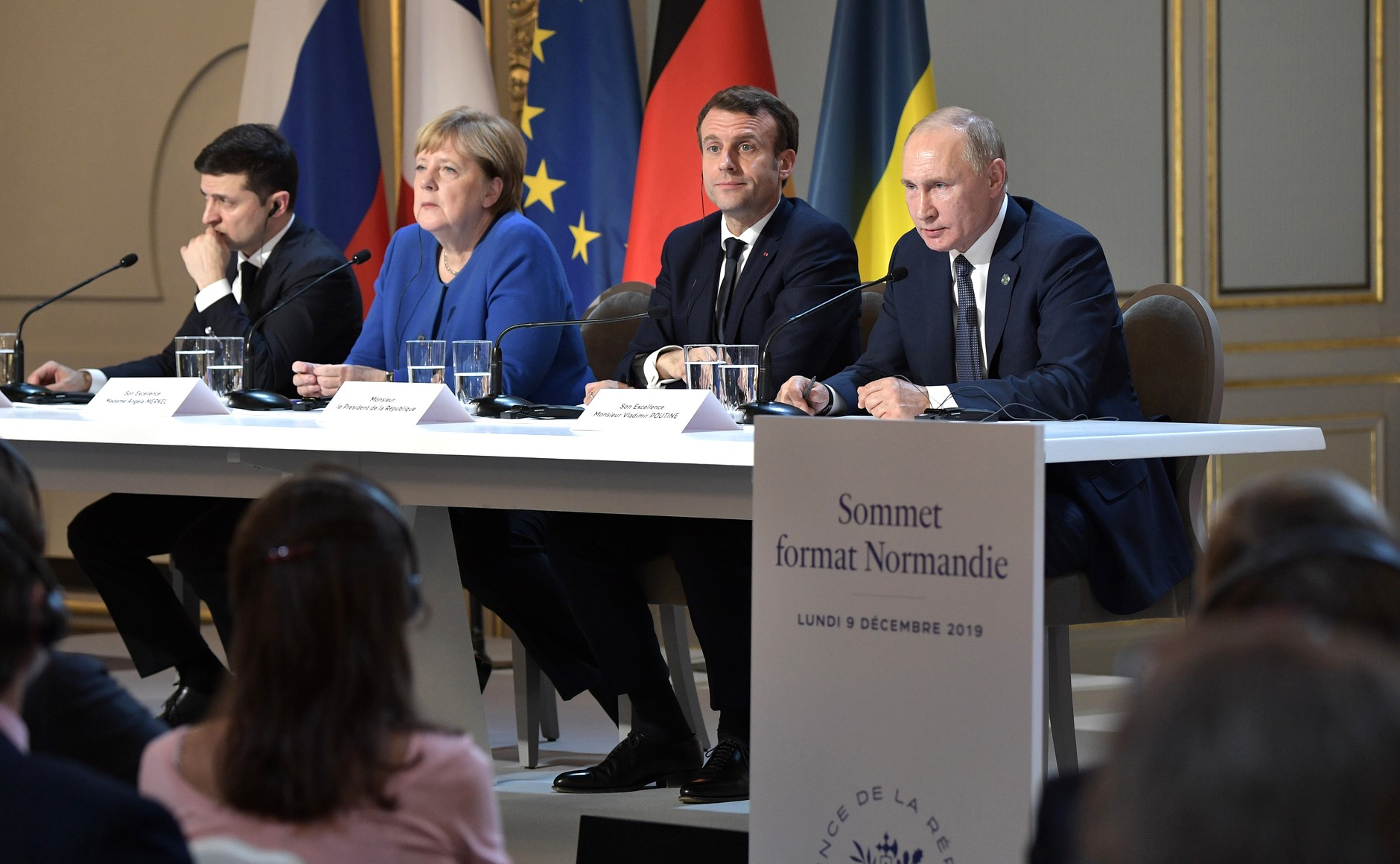
Zelenskyy, Merkel, Macron and Putin in Paris, France, December 2019

- 1 October: Following extensive negotiations, Ukraine, Russia, the DPR, LPR, and the OSCE signed an agreement to try to end the conflict in Donbas. Called the "Steinmeier formula", after its proposer the German President Frank-Walter Steinmeier, the agreement envisages the holding of free elections in DPR and LPR territories, observed and verified by the OSCE, and the subsequent reintegration of those territories into Ukraine with special status. Russia demanded the agreement's signing before any continuation of the "Normandy Format" peace talks. A survey of public opinion in DPR and LPR-controlled Donbas conducted by the Centre for East European and International Studies in March 2019 found that 55% of those polled favoured reintegration with Ukraine. 24% of those in favour of reintegration supported a return to the pre-war administrative system for Donetsk and Luhansk oblasts, while 33% percent supported special status for the region.
- 4 October: The spokesman of the Ukrainian operational headquarters that pro-Russian troops had opened fire on 41 occasions on Ukrainian positions; one Ukrainian soldier was killed in action. In the eastern area of operations, the Ukrainian stronghold of Avdiivka was hit by small arms fire and 120 mm mortar volleys, while an 82 mm mortar landed in nearby Pisky. Berezove received fire from small arms and 73 mm anti-tank recoilless rifles. Novotroitske and Kaminaka came under anti-tank rocket fire. Novohnativka and Pischevyk were shelled with automatic grenade launchers. Small arms fire was reported at Pavlopil, Kaminaka, Novotroitske, Vodiane, Pischevyk and Marinka. In the northern front, pro-Russian armoured fighting vehicles engaged Ukrainian redoubts at Krymske supported by small arms, different grenade-launcher systems and 120 mm mortars. Luhanske came under the combined fire of small arms, grenade launchers, 82 mm mortars and 120 mm mortars. Novoluhanske was meanwhile shelled with grenade launchers and 82 mm mortars. Pivdenne received fire from small arms, 73 mm anti-tank recoilless rifles and 120 mm mortars. Troitske was struck by an 82 mm mortar barrage. Orekhove and Vilnyi became the target of small arms and anti-tank rocket launchers. Zolote was hit by anti-tank rocket fire, while Popasna was fired upon with small arms and automatic grenade launchers.
- 29 October: In line with the Steinmeier formula, Ukrainian and separatist troops began withdrawing from the town of Zolote. Attempts to withdraw earlier in the month had been prevented by protests from Ukrainian war veterans. A further withdrawal was successfully completed in Petrovske during November. Following the withdrawals, and a successful Russian–Ukrainian prisoner swap, Russian president Vladimir Putin, Ukrainian president Volodymyr Zelenskyy, French president Emmanuel Macron and German chancellor Angela Merkel met in Paris on 9 December 2019 in a resumption of the Normandy format talks. The two sides agreed to exchange all remaining prisoners of war by the end of 2019, work toward new elections in Donbas, and schedule further talks.

== November ==
- 11 November Ukrainian troops and armored vehicles were removed near Petrovske and Bohdanivka. The area was cleared of mines. Separatist forces also stated that they pulled away from the front line, but stated they were shelled and fired upon by Ukrainian troops over the course of three days. The pullout by both sides was part of a broader effort to secure peace talks between Ukraine and Russia by France and Germany.

== December ==
- 9 December: three Ukrainian soldiers were killed by a landmine. According to the Ukrainian military, Russian-backed forces violated the ceasefire 7 times using BMP-1 armoured vehicles, grenade launchers, heavy machine guns, and small arms.
- 29 December: Around 200 prisoners were exchanged on 29 December 2019, after the agreement between Ukraine and the rebel republics brokered by the contact group at Minsk in October.
