= Timeline of the war in Donbas (2015) =

List of events during the war in Donbas in 2015

- 2014; 2015; 2016; 2017; 2018; 2019; 2020; 2021; 2022

This is a timeline of the war in Donbas for the year 2015.

== January–March ==
- 2 January: Ukrainian analyst Dmitry Tymchuk reported single tank incursions around Trokhizbenka, a tactic the rebels used previously against Donetsk airport and dubbed "roaming tank". According to him, single pro-Russian tanks supported by scouts and mortar fire to suppress antitank weapons shoot three or four rounds on a target before shifting its firing positions in order to attack the objective repeatedly.
- 3 January: Pro-Russian scouts in snow camouflage suits executed harassing fire on Ukraine's 92nd brigade positions near Shchastia using automatic weapons and rocket propelled grenades.
- 4 January: Heavy shelling was witnessed by local residents in Donetsk city, where militias entrenched around the train station fired "Gvozdika" howitzer salvos on the airport. "Uragan" or "Smerch" artillery rockets were launched from Shchehlovskoho cemetery. Fourteen civilians were injured.
- 6 January: Heavy shelling was reported at Donetsk airport and other Ukrainian positions. The rebels fired mortars, artillery and multiple-rocket launchers. Ukrainian troops clashed with enemy scouts near Starolaspa, killing two militiamen and scattering the survivors. Some Ukrainian army units attended local churches in the front to celebrate Orthodox Christmas.
- 7 January: On Christmas Day, Donetsk airport and surrounding locations were once again shelled with mortars and multiple rocket launchers.
- 9 January: Heavy fighting erupted near Stanytsia Luhanska between the Ukrainian National Guard and rebel militias. Two guards were killed and eight wounded in the clashes, which lasted for two hours. The militias fired "Grad" rockets in the aftermath. According to Luhansk Oblast Governor Hennadiy Moskal, Krymske was struck by mortar fire and "Grad" rockets, while Shchastia became the target of mortars and artillery. Ukrainian and pro-Russian forces trade intense gunfire in the area of Stanytsia Luhanska.
- 11 January: Two industrial plants were damaged by artillery fire in Donetsk city and in nearby Avdiivka. In Donetsk, 364 workers were trapped inside "Zasyatko" coal mine after a shell hit a power substation, disabling four boilers and 63 transformers. Meanwhile, Avdiivka Coke Plant was repeatedly struck by artillery rounds that affected the fourth and the sixth floors of the main building and the coke and hydrodesulfurization compounds.
- 13 January: Volnovakha bus attack. At least 13 civilians were killed and 15 injured, after a "Grad" artillery rocket exploded near passenger bus at Buhas roadblock near Volnovakha. Initially separatists took responsibility for this incident, which they thought was a successful destruction of the Ukrainian roadblock. After the information about civilian bus hit the news, they denied having "even technical possibilities" to shell that area. OSCE experts inspecting the place of incident confirmed that it was caused by "rockets fired from a north-north-eastern direction". which coincides with the earlier analyses pointed to Dokuchaevsk as the shelling origin (the actual launching process was also allegedly filmed by local residents).
- 15 January: The rebels launched a major assault on Donetsk airport, killing two Ukrainian paratroopers and wounding seven, according to Ukrainian sources. The Ukrainian forces had lost by then two thirds of the new terminal. The pro-Russian offensive in the area continued into the next day. One Ukrainian paratrooper was killed and eleven wounded. The rebels launched tear gas grenades to support their assault.
- 17 January: Shelling of the Donetsk Airport area by separatists significantly increased and as result of a significant push forward their forces effectively surrounded the government forces, cutting supply and enforcement lines. The situation was described as "critical". Communication lines with government forces were also reportedly cut by Russian electronic warfare units operating in the area. In response, Ukrainian forces began a counter-offensive with a number of tanks entering suburbs of Donetsk during the night and morning of 18 January.
- 18 January: Two Ukrainian soldiers and two civilian were killed in the northern front when Cossack units of the "Great Don Army" fired "Grad" artillery rockets on Trokhizbenka, Shchastia and Popasna. Over the day heavy fighting continued in the airport area and Debaltseve pocket. "Grad" shelling by separatists from Horlivka aimed at Debaltseve was confirmed by OSCE observers based on unexploded ordnances remains. The shelling covered area of 1 km^{2} and resulted in the death of three civilians and 12 wounded. The mission also observed buildings destroyed by incoming artillery fire in Donetsk and Luhansk, but was unable to establish shelling direction.
- 19 January: One Ukrainian "cyborg" — the nickname of the Ukrainian paratroopers defending Donetsk airport — was killed and ten wounded during the renewed rebel offensive on the new terminal, where the roof of the second floor collapsed after being blown up by the separatists. The rebel militias stormed the ground and second floors of the new terminal building. Ukrainian troops continued to hold out on the first floor of the building until the separatists blew up the second floor, causing it to collapse onto them. Several soldiers were killed or trapped in the rubble. Pro-Russian forces supported by tanks and artillery launched a large offensive on Bakhmutka road, taking over checkpoint No. 31, north of Frunze, and threatening checkpoint nº 29 to the west. The main objective of the rebel operation was to isolate Krimsky. The village of Zholobok was overrun by what the Ukrainian forces described as "Russian troops". At least two Ukrainian soldiers died in the assault, according to commander Semen Semenchenko. Ukrainian officials and soldiers on the ground insisted that the attack was carried out "not by separatists or Cossacks, but by Russians".
- 21 January: The Ukrainian army acknowledged that their forces withdrew from the old and the new terminals of Donetsk airport, but kept control of the airfield and its surroundings. Six Ukrainian paratroopers were killed during the rebel assault, and another 16 were taken prisoner. An OSCE report said that 80 Ukrainian defenders of the airport, treated at a hospital in Konstyantynivka, showed symptoms compatible with a poison gas attack, such as convulsions, vomiting, dyspnea and loss of consciousness.
- 22 January: Ukrainian President Petro Poroshenko announced that the Ukrainian armoured forces had prevailed in what he described as "tank battles". Poroshenko claimed that three rebel tanks and two trucks loaded with ammunition were destroyed, and several armoured personnel carriers and fighting vehicles captured. The Ukrainian military had reported a "tank duel" near the village of Krimsky at 10 a.m. Earlier, Semen Semenchenko said that members of the Ukrainian 24th Mechanized Brigade knocked down at least three enemy tanks on Bakhmutka road, in the area of checkpoint nº 31. Another tank was disabled by a recoilless rifle while attempting to overrun checkpoint nº 29. Further efforts to surround the Ukrainian position were hampered by the icy roads. The nearby village of Toshkivka was hit by artillery fire from Stankhanov.
- 23 January: Intense fighting continued on Bakhmutka road. Ukrainian sources said that checkpoint nº 31, abandoned by Ukrainian troops after the pro-Russian offensive, remained unmanned and under heavy artillery fire from the Ukrainian side. Rebel artillery in the area shelled Krimsky, Trokhizbenka, Novotoshkivka and Nyzhnje. Shchastia, Valuiske and other settlements were attacked with tanks and mortar fire. Anti-aircraft guns were fired on Ukrainian outposts around Krimsky. An assault on Ukrainian positions at Novotoshkivka was beaten off by artillery fire. Sources from the self-proclaimed Donetsk People's Republic claimed that a Ukrainian multiple launched rocket barrage killed 24 pro-Russian troops.
- 24 January: At least 30 civilians were killed in Mariupol when pro-Russian forces shelled the city with artillery and "Grad" rockets launched from the village of Novoshyrokivske (Oktyabr) (19 km NE) and Zaichenko (15 km NE), according to OSCE reports.
- 26 January: Heavy fighting continued around Sanzharivka, in Debaltseve pocket, where the pro-Russian forces launched an offensive supported by tanks on 25 January. The main Ukrainian stronghold there was the target of "Grad" rockets on six occasions. Two people was killed in Stanitsya Luhanska after the town was hit by rebel artillery. Most of its inhabitants had been evacuated. In the same area, pro-Russian armoured columns were trying to cross the river Seversky Donets at different points.
- 28 January: Without power, gas and water supply for the ninth consecutive day, the residents of Debaltseve were on the brink of a humanitarian catastrophe. Six people were killed and 12 wounded over the last 48 hours in Horlivka, as a result of heavy fighting in the area.
- 28 January: The rebel offensive on Debaltseve pocket continued in full swing. Separatist troops broke into Maloorlivka overnight, but their advance was halted by the Ukrainian defenders. Pro-Russian tanks from Horlivka burst into Uglegorsk early in the morning, meeting Ukrainian forces in the city's centre. Heavy fighting went on into the evening, despite "Azov" battalion's claims that the assault was beaten off and Ukraine's National Guard was "cleaning up" the remaining separatists.
- 30 January: The rebel offensive on Debaltseve pocket continued. Fierce fighting was underway in Uglegorsk, where Ukrainian authorities acknowledged that the separatists took control of at least some areas of the town. Militiamen on the ground said that the only remaining resistance came from Ukrainian forces entrenched in the local train station. Pro-Russian artillery killed seven civilians at Debaltseve itself. At this point the frontline was just 15 km away. In the area of Bakhmutka road, rebel forces fired on Ukrainian troops around Krimsky and Shchastia with tanks and antitank missiles. Shchastia itself was the target of "Grad" rockets. Krimsky and Hirske were attacked three times using mortars and artillery.
- 31 January: Over the last three days, Ukrainian forces evacuated 956 people -among them 161 children- from the towns of Debaltseve, Avdiivka and Svitlodarsk. The rescuers moved out 310 civilian residents from Debaltseve alone. Ukrainian media reported that Uglegorsk was "now really in the hands of enemy forces", after an ill-fated Ukrainian counterattack which left four Ukrainian army tanks disabled. The remaining Ukrainian troops withdrew from the town. Separatist shelling killed 12 civilian residents in Debaltseve itself.
- 1 February: Brigadier general Isa Munayev was killed in a battle around Debaltseve. Donbas Battalion commander Semen Semenchenko was wounded and four of his subordinates killed during an attempt to retake Uglegorsk. Another 11 Ukrainian soldiers were evacuated to a Kharkiv hospital.
- 3 February: In the area of Bakhmutka road and Stanytsia Luhanska, the militias resorted again to single tank attacks on Ukrainian forward outposts, also known as "roaming tank" tactics.
- 5 February: Separatist artillery killed five local residents at Debaltseve pocket during the day. In the afternoon, pro-Russian forces fired on Ukrainian positions on 49 occasions in Debaltseve pocket only. Most of the attacks were carried out on Mius, Chernukhin and Troitske.
- 6 February: In a short lull of fighting in ongoing Battle of Debaltseve, DPR and Ukrainian forces agreed to establish a humanitarian corridor on 6 February, in another attempt to allow the remaining civilians to escape from Debaltseve.
- 9 February: During the morning, separatist attempted to take over the strategic village of Lohvynove, blocking the strategic road between Debaltseve and Artemivsk. Semen Semenchenko reported that the rebel offensive, led by tanks, armoured fighting vehicles and infantry was contained by a detachment of the "Donbas" battalion and Ukrainian regular forces. Also in Debaltseve pocket, Ukrainian troops withdrew to positions 4 km away from Chernukhin, according to members of OSCE. Troitske and Chernukhin itself were completely surrounded by pro-Russian forces by early morning. The secretary of the National Security and Defense Council of Ukraine, Oleksandr Turchinov, announced that the "Azov" battalion carried out a successful counteroffensive pushing separatists out of a number of villages east of Mariupol. Pavlopil, Shyronkyne, Kominternove, Lebedynske and Berdyanske were reported to be controlled by Ukrainian army.
- 10 February: The Ukrainian military airfield at Kramatorsk was hit by 41 "Smerch" (or "Tornado-G") rockets at noon. The rockets were fired from Horlivka by pro-Russian troops. The attack killed sixteen people, other 64 people — 35 civilians and 29 soldiers — were wounded. A Russian drone was shot down in the area just minutes before the strike.
- 11 February: Six civilians were killed and eight wounded when artillery fire hit a bus station in downtown Donetsk.
- 12 February: The Ukrainian army launched an offensive on Lohvynove, with the aim of retaking control of the road between Debaltseve and Artemivsk. The separatists made a counterattack led by seven tanks, and a major battle raged on. "Donbas" battalion commander Semen Semenchenko later reported three Ukrainian soldiers killed, four wounded, and one tank and one armoured personnel carrier disabled. After 17 hours of negotiations in Minsk, the leaders of Ukraine, Russia, Germany and France signed a ceasefire accord to be implemented on 15 February.
- 13 February: Pro-Russian armoured forces retook Lohvynove after defeating the Ukrainian National Guard and the Ukrainian army troops defending the village. The Ukrainians lost three tanks and withdrew when no armoured vehicle support was available. The Ukrainian side claimed to have made 17 prisoners.
- 15 February: In the afternoon, rebel military spokesman Eduard Basurin said that the militias will continue to shell Ukrainian positions at Debaltseve pocket because, in his own words, this was "our territory". According to Ukrainian military spokesman Vladislav Seleznev, rebel tanks at Debaltseve shelled outposts manned by soldiers of the "Kryvbass" battalion, and Cossack troops demanded their surrender. Ukrainian artillery returned fire.
- 16 February: The prime minister of the Donetsk republic, Alexander Zakharchenko, issued an ultimatum to the Ukrainian army units in Debaltseve to flee the town by 23:00 "leaving behind weapons and equipment". Yuriy Sinkovsky, deputy commander of the 40th mechanized battalion "Kryvbass" said that several Ukrainian redoubts, specially two at the village of Oktyabrske, were isolated and had lost communications with each other.
- 17 February: According to reports from people on the ground separatist militias took control of the railway station and the police barracks in Debaltseve. The stationhouse was previously heavily damaged by shelling. Twenty Ukrainian servicemen were wounded when "Grad" rockets landed around their positions. The Ukrainian chief-of-staff did not confirm the information, but acknowledged that there was fierce street fighting inside the town. Semen Semenchenko also recognized that the situation in Debaltseve was "very hard" and the lack of a "decisive action" could be "costly". A relief column composed by members of the 101 brigade of the Ukrainian army was ambushed by pro-Russian armoured forces. The column was forced to surrender after being outgunned by the rebels. Dozens of Ukrainian soldiers were captured, some of them wounded. Later, Russian media showed a line of Ukrainian prisoners marching on a country road. The source claimed that a total of 72 soldiers were captured. Debaltseve had been isolated by the militias during the last five days. By evening, the Ukrainian military had recognized that pro-Russian forces had broken into the town, and that a fierce battle was underway. Russian president Vladimir Putin called for the Ukrainian troops surrounded in Debaltseve to laid down their weapons.
- 18 February: Debaltseve pocket fell to pro-Russian forces in the morning, after several days of fighting. President Poroshenko claimed that Ukrainian army withdrew "in an organized manner", and that 80 percent of the troops were out of the area by noon. Russian media said that Ukrainian soldiers attempted to fight their way out of the pocket after being surrounded by the militias. Deputy minister of defence of the Donetsk republic, Eduard Basurin, reported that Debaltseve was under rebel control, though some isolated Ukrainian resistance remained south of the town. The Ukrainian military reported 22 soldiers killed over the past three days in the area, while separatist sources put the Ukrainian death toll in the hundreds. The Ukrainian deputy minister of Defence, Yuriy Biryukov, later claimed that 179 Ukrainian soldiers were killed in Debaltseve pocket from 18 January to 18 February.
- 2 March: President Poroshenko awarded the title of "Hero of Ukraine" to female pilot and member of "Aidar" battalion Nadiya Savchenko, captured by pro-Russian troops last summer and handed over to Russian authorities, who indicted her on murder charges. She was keeping in custody since then.
- 4 March: At noon, a lone pro-Russian tank accompanied by an infantry detachment shelled positions of the "Azov" battalion at Shyrokyne. The Ukrainian soldiers fended off the attack by firing a 23mm antiaircraft cannon.
- 5 March: The rebels fired upon Ukrainian troops 14 times in the same period using small arms, rocket propelled grenades and mortars. The militias attempted an assault on Ukrainian redoubts around Shyrokyne.
- 9 March: During the morning pro-Russian troops stormed Ukrainian positions around Shyrokyne using small arms and mortars. The Ukrainian military claimed that heavy weapons such as 120 mm mortars and tanks were employed to support the offensive, in violation of the "silent mode". The battle continued well into the evening.
- 10 March: Heavy fighting was reported at Shyrokyne, where the clashes lasted until the early hours of the day. Pro-Russian troops assaulted the Ukrainian positions with small arms, rocket propelled grenades, mortars and tanks. Ukrainian officials claimed that return fire disabled a tank and blew up an ammunition depot. Two Ukrainian servicemen were wounded in action.
- 19 March: For the first time in a month, "Grad" rockets landed in Sokolniki, in the northern area of operations, where pro-Russian tanks also opened fire on four occasions.
- 27 March: Heavy fighting erupted in Shyrokyne at evening, according to members of the "Azov" battalion. The rebels pounded the Ukrainian garrison with machine gun fire, rocket propelled grenades and mortars. The explosions of 120 mm mortar rounds were felt as far as Mariupol. The Ukrainian army returned fire. By this date, more than 50 percent of all residential buildings in Shyrokyne were reported damaged beyond repair.
- 31 March: Members of the "Azov" battalion reported a two-hour bombardment with mortars and artillery on Shyrokyne during the evening. Separatist tanks later joined the shelling.

== April–June ==
- 5 April: During the morning, six Ukrainian soldiers were killed in action in two separate incidents. Four of them died while their vehicle was attacked with a laser-guided anti-tank missile by separatists while crossing a bridge on a truck near Shchastia, in the northern front. The other two died when the SUV they were riding on hit a landmine near Shyrokyne, east of Mariupol. Another serviceman was wounded.
- 12 April: The Ukrainian National Guard announced that all the former volunteer fighters in the Donbas area of operations have been amalgamated into the ranks of the Ukrainian armed forces. In the course of the day, while Orthodox Christians celebrated Easter, fighting intensified along the frontlines. Separatist forces attacked Ukrainian positions around Pisky with artillery and tanks. According to Ukrainian sources, one pro-Russian tank was knocked down by the defenders.
- 23 April: Ukrainian troops claimed to have foiled an infiltration attempt north of Volnovakha, killing one militant and captured other six after a brief battle at Berezove. The following day, Pro-Russian scouts clashed with Ukrainian troops at Pisky. A barrage of "Grad" rockets landed in Starohnativka, the second time over the past week.
- 28 April: "Grad" artillery rockets were fired at Novolaspa and Avdiivka.
- 4 May: The Ukrainian military reported 45 violations of the ceasefire last night; that's made a total of 95 attacks for the previous day, a level similar to those observed before the signing of the Minsk agreement. The rebels used heavy weapons like tanks, 120 mm mortars, 122 mm guns and 152 mm howitzers. Ukrainian troops evicted separatist scouts from the village of Novoselivka, on Bakhmutka road, after a brief engagement.
- 5 May: Shyrokyne endured a 12-hour bombardment, including a tank attack on Ukrainian entrenchments on the beach. At sunset, the village was the target of 122 mm guns and 152 mm howitzers for two hours. One member of the "Donbas" battalion was wounded.
- 16 May: Two soldiers of the GRU of Russian Federation were taken prisoners near Shchastia — Captain Yevgeniy Yerofeyev and Sergeant Aleksandr Aleksandrov. They were members of a Russian Special forces detachment based in the city of Togliatti, Samara Oblast, and were captured during close combat between members of the "Aidar" battalion and pro-Russian forces from Luhansk city.
- 19 May: Major fighting broke out in the afternoon at Katerynivka, near Zolote, after pro-Russian troops lured Ukrainian scouts into the open and ambushed them with machine guns and mortars. According to Luhansk governor Hennady Moskal, the militias bombarded Ukrainian positions from Stakhanov and Pervomaisk before the battle. The action lasted for several hours. The Ukrainian military confirmed three soldiers killed and six wounded in the battle.
- 20 May: The leadership of the Federal State of Novorossiya announced the termination of the confederation 'project' because the confederation did not comply with the Minsk II agreement.
- 22 May: Pro-Russian tanks shelled Shyrokyne from their maximum range to avoid return fire. At least one Ukrainian armoured vehicle was hit in Shchastia and one soldier was wounded. Several houses were set ablaze.
- 1 June: At evening, pro-Russian forces focused their efforts on Shyrokyne, which became the target of small arms and 120 mm mortars. Ukrainian positions were also engaged by hostile tanks for one hour.
- 3 June: Fierce attacks with "Grad" multiple rocket launchers, artillery and tanks were launched early in the morning against Ukrainian positions in Krasnohorivka, Marinka, and elsewhere in Donetsk Oblast in support of a massive pro-Russian offensive on Marinka; by noon 25 Ukrainian soldiers had been wounded. The Ukrainian army acknowledged that the separatists overran one Ukrainian forward outposts in the outskirts of Marinka. OSCE reported DPR heavy battle vehicles (tanks and artillery) moving westwards in the night between 2 and 3 June as well as "Grad" shelling from DPR territory early morning on 3 June.
- 4 June: Ukrainian media reported three civilian residents killed and five wounded in the course of the pro-Russian offensive on Maryinka and Krasnohorivka. According to OSCE figures released the next day 28 people, including nine civilians, were killed in Maryinka. The Ukrainian Navy claimed that the frigate Hetman Sahaydachniy had driven out the Russian patrol ship Ladniy which it accused of spying near the territorial waters of Ukraine.
- 7 June: Near Mariupol an explosion occurred on a coastal guard vessel in the afternoon. The boat, identified as UMC-1000, was rocked by the blast while on patrol off Prymorske, 4,000 ms away from the shoreline. Two other coast guard ships and divers were deployed for search and rescue. On board of the vessel were seven crewmembers, six of them were taken to hospital while the rescuers continued the search for the boat's commander. It was later determined that the small craft had hit an improvised naval mine, disguised as a radio buoy. The body of the commander was eventually found when the wreckage was checked after being towed to port.
- 8 June: New clashes were reported at Maryinka in the course of the morning. Ukrainian positions in the village were the target of small arms, automatic grenade launchers, antitank missiles and 120 mm mortars.
- 10 June: A battle between mechanized forces took place at Sokolniki, in the northern area of operations. Pro-Russian forces used small arms, heavy machine guns and armoured fighting vehicles. One Ukrainian soldier was wounded.
- 15 June: Separatist authorities told the press that Ukrainian tanks from Krymske, supported by 82 mm and 120 mm mortars, engaged pro-Russian positions at Sokolniki. A number of civilian residences were damaged.
- 19 June: OSCE summarized ceasefire violation log books recorded by Ukraine and Russian army representatives at Joint Centre for Control and Co-ordination (JCCC) in Soledar. Russian representative recorded 71 violations, 15 attributed to the UAF and 56 to separatist forces. Ukrainian representative recorded 113 violations, 23 attributed to UAF and 90 to separatists. Observers in Shyrokyne reported a "tense" situation with "incoming and outgoing explosions and small arms fire".
- 23 June: The separatists employed "roaming tank" tactics in Avdiivka and Opytne, according to military analyst Dmitry Tymchuk.
- 25 June: Pro-Russian troops fired "Grad-p" single rocket launchers at Shyrokyne.
- 30 June: Multiple-weapon strikes were reported at Shyrokyne and 122 mm artillery and "Grad-p" rocket fire on Berdyansk. The Ukrainian artillery retaliated on several occasions.

== July–September ==
- 2 July: Donetsk People's Republic deputy Minister of Defence, Eduard Basurin, declared that all pro-Russian forces had been withdrawn from Shyrokyne unilaterally, after an agreement with members of the OSCE mission. The militias' activity decreased sharply overnight. In the northern front, the separatists launched a mortar attack on Stanitsya Luhanska. There were clashes between Ukrainian troops and pro-Russian infantry in Krimsky -where the fighting lasted for one and a half hour-, Shchastia, Trokhizbenka and Zolote. Skirmishes also occurred at Leninske and Kirove, south of Artemivsk. Pisky was the epicenter of the pro-Russian attacks around Donetsk city. Small arms, tanks and heavy mortars pounded Ukrainian positions in the area adjoining Donetsk airport.
- 5 July: Five Ukrainian soldiers were killed and ten wounded over the past 24 hours. Six of the casualties -three dead and three wounded- were the result of an improvised explosive device that went off near checkpoint nº 29, on Bakhmutka road, Luhansk Oblast.
- 13 July: The Ukrainian military recorded 80 attacks on their troops during the same period, five of them using 122 mm and 152 mm artillery. The rebels also fired 120 mm mortars, tanks and multiple rocket launchers. Two hostile drones were shot down by the Ukrainian army.
- 14 July: Ukrainian military sources reported that separatist forces broke the truce on more than 100 occasions throughout the day, 19 of them by firing heavy weapons banned by the Minsk agreement. Ukrainian positions received tank fire, 120 mm mortar rounds, 152 mm and 122 mm artillery fire and multiple fired rockets. A clash between Ukrainian infantry and pro-Russian scouts tok place at Opytne.
- 15 July: The Donetsk regional administration press service reported one Ukrainian serviceman killed in action and 10 others wounded over the past 24 hours. An undetermined number of civilians were also killed south of Artemivsk when 152 mm howitzers were fired at the village of Kodema. The militias broke the ceasefire 90 times during the same period, 33 of them using banned heavy weapons. The separatists used 120 mm mortars, tanks, 122 mm artillery and 152 mm howitzers. Heavy shelling was reported on Avdiivka, Pervomaisk, Opytne and Verkhnotoretske -Donetsk city area-, Novhorodske, Kirove, Leninske and Maiorsk -south of Artemivsk- and Starohnativka and Nikolaevka, north of Mariupol.
- 27 July: One Ukrainian soldier was killed in action and other seven wounded during the last 24 hours in the Donbas region. One civilian was wounded in Avdiivka. The Ukrainian military reported 86 attacks on their troops over the same period. The militias used banned heavy weapons like 120 mm mortars, tanks, 122 mm guns, 152 mm howitzers and "Grad" multiple rocket launchers. The Ukrainian garrison at Nikolaevka, south of Artemivsk, was the target of small arms, 120 mm mortars, tanks and 152 mm artillery from the rebel-held settlements of Horlivka, Zaitseve and Holmivskiy. Maiorsk and Pervomaisk were also shelled with 152 mm howitzers and 120 mm mortars from Horlivka. There was harassing fire on Ukrainian forces at Maryinka, Shyrokyne, Opytne, Avdiivka, Pisky, Maiorsk, Kirove, Pervomaisk, Stanitsya Luhanska and Shchastia. Pro-Russian tanks deployed at Vesel Hora launched an attack on Ukrainian redoubts at Shchastia. Opytne was attacked for three hours with 120 mm mortars, tanks, 122 mm artillery and "Grad" artillery rockets firing from Donetsk city and Spartak. "Grad" rockets launched from the same locations landed in nearby Vodiane. Heavy 120 mm mortars, 122 mm guns and 152 mm howitzers were also fired on Ukrainian positions at Maiorsk, Nikolaevka -south of Artemivsk-, Hranitne, Starohnativka -Mariupol area-, Vodiane, Pisky, Prvomaisk, Opytne -around Donetsk city-, Shchastia and Stanitsya Luhanska, in the northern front. Pro-Russian tanks shelled Opytne and Krasnohorivka. Ukrainian forces beat off an infiltration attempt near Kryakivka, Luhansk Oblast, northern front.
- 31 July: The Ukrainian army claimed that the militias broke the ceasefire on 109 occasions, 70 of them in the surroundings of Donetsk city. The militias shelled Avdiivka and Pisky with 120 mm mortars. Opytne was the target of armoured fighting vehicles, tanks and 120 mm mortars. Civilian residences at Verkhnotoretske and Avdiivka were pounded by rebel fire during the night. Pro-Russian tanks fired at Ukrainian positions at Nikolaevka, south of Artemivsk.
- 2 August: The OSCE Special Monitoring Mission (SMM) revisited five "DPR" and four Ukrainian Armed Forces heavy weapons holding areas. An armed man guarding the facility at one of the "DPR" sites claimed that he and those present at the site were part of the 16th airborne brigade from Orenburg, Russian Federation. They did not wear identifying insignia. Russian Ministry of Defence declared later that a brigade with such number and/or name does not exist. Russian presidential spokesman Dmitry Peskov said on August 4 that "the trustworthiness of these reports needs to be verified".
- 10 August: Early in the morning, a major battle took place in the area of Starohnativka, north of Mariupol. Ukrainian officials from the 72 mechanized brigade and Right Sector volunteers claimed that their positions were assaulted by a pro-Russian armoured unit composed of ten tanks, ten armoured fighting vehicles and 400 troops supported by 122 mm artillery fire. According to them, the offensive was halted, and in the subsequent counterattack Ukrainian forces evicted the militias from the heights around Starohnativka. Right Sector's sources said the focal point of the fighting was the village of Bila Kamyanka, and that seven Ukrainian servicemen were killed and 11 wounded. Ukrainian journalist Andriy Stapilenko reported one death and nine wounded among members of the 72 mechanized brigade. He also reported one tank lost. Donetsk People's Republic deputy ministry of defence, Eduard Basurin, said that the battle was the result of a Ukrainian attempt to seize the nearby village of Novolaspa, and that their troops forced the intruders to withdraw. Three civilians were killed, and one rebel soldier was wounded. At mid-morning, the Ukrainian garrison at Starohnativka became the target of "Grad" multiple rocket volleys.
- 12 August: In what became the worst spell of violence in weeks, rebel troops opened fire on Ukrainian positions on 152 occasions during the same period. In the main incidents, pro-Russian forces from Artemivsk, led by armoured fighting vehicles, engaged Ukrainian positions at Kirove supported by anti-tank rocket launchers, mortars and artillery. "Grad" rockets landed in Talakivka.
- 14 August: The Ukrainian military said that 14 August marked the most intense activity in months, with 175 rebel attacks on Ukrainian troops. In the area around Donetsk city, the militias pounded Ukrainian positions at Avdiivka, Novoselivka, Novobakhmutivka, Novomyhailivka, Pervomaisk and Vodiane with 152 mm howitzers. Mortar rounds landed in Abakumova mining complex, Nevelske, Pisky, Opytne and Vodiane. Krasnohorivka was the target of 120 mm mortars on four occasions. Talakivka, east of Mariupol, was hit by multiple rocket barrages and 120 mm mortar rounds. Residential areas of Pavlopil were rocket by artillery fire. South of Artemivsk, Dzerzhinsky, Sanzharivka and Leninske were also the target of rebel artillery. Pro-Russian tanks attacked Zaitseve, supported by 120 mm mortars. Three civilians were reported killed and at least 18 injured in eastern Ukraine during the same period.
- 15 August: The militias opened fire on 136 occasions on Ukrainian troops. Early in the morning, "Grad" artillery rockets landed in Pervomaisk, west of Donetsk city. An hour later, Karlivka was struck by 152 mm artillery rounds. In the area south of Artemivsk, Ukrainian positions near Luhanske were attacked with rocket propelled grenades and armoured fighting vehicles. Zaitseve was again the target of mortar fire. Around Mariupol, mortar rounds landed in Starohnativka, Talakivka and Hranitne. Stahronativka and Talakivka were later pounded by heavy artillery rounds; starohnativka was also hit by "Grad" rockets. In the northern front, the militias fired rocket propelled grenades and antitank missiles on Ukrainian troops at Trokhizbenka.
- 16 August: The Ukrainian military recorded 148 violations of the truce by the militias. In the course of the day pro-Russian forces concentrated their efforts in the area of Donetsk city. Heavy artillery rounds fell on Ukrainian positions near Avdiivka and Taramchuk early in the morning. Some hours later, armoured vehicles and machine guns opened fire on Ukrainian troops at Opytne. Pisky, Krasnohorivka and Verkhnotoretske were the target of 120 mm mortar fire. At noon, the village of Novokalinovo was hit by 122 mm artillery volleys. A checkpoint in Aleksandrivka manned by Ukrainian border guards was attacked four times with small arms, automatic grenade launchers and mortars. Ukrainian troops at Stanitsya Luhanska, in the northern front, were harassed with rocket propelled grenades and 120 mm mortars. Zaitseve, south of Artemivsk, was pounded twice by 122 mm artillery fire. The militias fired 120 mm mortars at Bohdanivka and Starohnativka, north of Mariupol. Late in the night, "Grad" artillery rocket landed in Sartana and Lebedynske. A number of civilian casualties were reported.
- 1 September: A renewal of the ceasefire was agreed at Minsk between the warring parties through the Trilateral Contact Group (TGG), composed of representatives from Ukraine, Russia and the OSCE mission.
- 8 September: One Ukrainian soldier was killed and two others were wounded in action in the Donbas region during the last 24 hours. All the casualties occurred in an afternoon battle that took place between the villages of Novokyivka and Syze, that are situated not far from the Ukrainian-Russian border, in Luhansk Oblast. A second Ukrainian serviceman was confirmed killed later in the day. The casualties belonged to the 128th Infantry Brigade. Ukrainian forces were engaged in a battle with a reconnaissance-diversionary militia unit that had crossed the Siverskyi Donets at night.
- 11 September: For the first time over several months the Ukrainian army recorded no violations of the ceasefire by pro-Russian forces on 10 September. No violations of the ceasefire were recorded during the first six hours of 11 September either.

== October–December ==
- 2 October: The so-called 'Normandy four' met for Ukraine ceasefire talks at Élysée Palace, Paris.
- 4 October: For the first time over several weeks the Ukrainian army reported no violations of the ceasefire on the past three days.
- 10 October: Ukrainian president Petro Poroshenko announced that the ceasefire was holding, and that there were no attacks, nor Ukrainian casualties over the past two weeks. A number of soldiers were however killed and wounded by mines and improvised explosive devices.
- 14 October: One Ukrainian soldier was killed and three other wounded in the course of an attack with under-barrel launched grenades and automatic grenade launchers in Avdiivka.
- 23 October: Andryi Lysenko reported five violations of the truce on the past 24 hours. Opytne, Piske and Shyrokyne became the target of small arms and different grenade launched systems.
- 26 October: Military analyst Dmitry Tymchuk confirmed the rebel attacks on Ukrainian positions near Opytne and Pisky. The Ukrainian troops received small arms fire, machine gun fire and rocket propelled grenades from pro-Russian positions in Pisky and Vesele. The militias also fired 82 mm mortar rounds on Starohnativka, north of Mariupol. Pro-Russian infantry riding on armoured personnel carriers poured small arms fire on Ukrainian troops at Zaitseve. Rebel snipers were active in several areas of the demarcation line such as Maryinka, west of Donetsk city, Shumy, south of Artemivsk, Popasna and Shchastia in the northern front and near Shyrokyne east of Mariupol. An official of the National Guard of Ukraine reported 174 members of the National Guard killed and 729 injured or wounded in the Donbas region since the beginning of ATO on 15 April 2014. Another 26 servicemen were reported missing and seven were taken prisoners.
- 30 October: Pro-Russian forces from Zhabichevo fired small arms, GP-25 grenade launchers and AGS-17 automatic grenade launchers on Ukrainian positions near Pisky, west of Donetsk city. The attack lasted from 15:15 to 15:45 pm and resulted in one Ukrainian soldier killed and another wounded.
- 3 November: The Ukrainian military reported 18 violations of the ceasefire over the past 24 hours. Ukrainian positions near Trokhizbenka, in the area of Bakhmutka road, Luhansk Oblast, were shelled with automatic grenade launchers, three Ukrainian servicemen were wounded. Pro-Russian forces carried out another eight attacks on Ukrainian troops across the Donbas. Small arms and automatic grenade launchers were fired at Avdiivka, Pisky, Opytne, west of Donetsk city and Shchastia, in the northern front. Snipers were also active in Avdiivka.
- 10 November: The Ukrainian military reported in the morning that their positions were targeted by rebels from various types of weaponry – from small arms and grenade launchers to anti-aircraft guns and mortars – on 51 occasions.
- 11 November: Ukrainian officials also claimed to have beaten off two infiltration attempts by pro-Russian forces during the night in the area of Novozvanivka, south of Popasna, Luhansk Oblast. The militias withdrew with several casualties.
- 22 November: The Ukrainian military reported in the morning that from 18:00 pm the previous evening by 06:00 am 22 November pro-Russian troops had opened fire on 40 occasions, including on 30 occasions in the surroundings of Donetsk city. Most attacks occurred at Maryinka, Pisky, Avdiivka and Pervomaisk, where the rebels fired small arms, heavy machine guns, and rocket propelled grenades.
- 24 November: The Ukrainian military reported in the morning that from 18:00 pm the previous evening by 06:00 am 22 November pro-Russian troops had opened fire on their positions on 30 occasions. Krasnohorovka, Pisky, Troitske, Avdiivka and Marinka received fire from infantry weapons, grenade launchers and anti-aircraft guns.
- 5 December: The Ukrainian military claimed that their troops beat off a pro-Russian assault of more than 100 militants in Mayorsk, killing at least 20 of them. Two vehicles and one mortar team were also reported destroyed. The militias retaliated by firing on the Ukrainian lines with small arms, heavy machine guns, heavy antitank rockets, armoured fighting vehicle's cannons and 82 mm mortars. The rebels also fired on Ukrainian troops from an armoured fighting vehicle hidden behind a school building in Zaitseve.
- 6 December: The spokesman of the Ukrainian operational headquarters reported that pro-Russian forces had broken the ceasefire on 51 occasions. The rebels fired banned 82 mm mortars on Zhelezna Balka, Novhorodske and Verkhnotoreske, in the area around Donetsk city. Avdiivka, Maryinka and Opytne, also near Donetsk, and Zaitseve, Maiorsk and Luhanske, south of Artemivsk, were the target of small arms fire, heavy machine guns and rocket propelled grenades. Krasnohorivka, west of Donetsk city, was fired on from the nearby village of Staromyhailivka with small arms, heavy machine guns, rocket propelled grenades, armoured fighting vehicle's cannons and 82 mm mortars.
- 8 December: According to Ukrainian military sources, pro-Russian troops had opened fire on 39 occasions, including one "Grad" multiple rocket strike on Zoryane, west of Donetsk city. Pro-Russian tanks shelled the village of Verkhnetoretske, in the same area. Pisky was attacked repeatedly with small arms, heavy machine guns, automatic grenade launchers and 120 mm mortars. Krasnohorivka and Verkhnetoretske were shelled with 120 mm and 82 mm mortars, as well as Luhanske and Zaitseve, in the area between Artemivsk and Horlivka. East of Mariupol, the militias harassed Ukrainian troops at Shyrokyne with small arms fire, sniper fire and rocket propelled grenades.
- 9 December: The report by the office of the U.N. High Commissioner for Human Rights put the death toll from 20 months of fighting at more than 9,100.
- 11 December: The spokesman of the Ukrainian operational headquarters reported in the morning that pro-Russian troops had opened fire on almost 50 occasions overnight. In the main incidents, Krasnohorivka became the target of snipers, anti-tank rocket launchers, anti-aircraft guns and 82 mm mortars.
- 19 December: The spokesman of the Ukrainian operational headquarters reported in the morning that pro-Russian troops had opened fire on 59 occasions overnight. In the main incidents, pro-Russian forces fired "Grad-p" single rockets at Ukrainian positions near Troitske and Luhanske. Zaitseve y Krasnohorivka were hit by 82 mm mortar barrages.
- 21 December: Pro-Russian forces opened fire on Ukrainian positions on 35 occasions overnight. An hour-long engagement between the warring factions took place in the northern area of the demarcation line near Troitske, Luhansk Oblast. In the same sector of the front, banned 120 mm mortar rounds landed near Stanitsya Luhanska. Ukrainian positions at Novhorodske, west of Horlivka, were the target of small arms, snipers, heavy machine guns and armoured fighting vehicles' cannon fire. South of Artemivsk, Luhanske and Maiorsk were meanwhile pounded with automatic grenade launchers. Zaitseve, in the same area, and Kasnohorivka, west of Donetsk city, were shelled with 82 mm mortars. Krasnohorivka was also fired on by pro-Russian tanks. Also around Donetsk, rebel forces harassed Ukrainian troops with small arms, heavy machine guns and rocket propelled grenades at Pisky, Opytne and Avdiivka.
- 22 December: The village of Kominternove, about 24 km east of Mariupol, in the so-called grey area, was captured by Donetsk People's Republic forces[465] using tanks and armoured personnel carriers. The information was denied by separatist officials, but confirmed by eyewitnesses. Five pro-Russian tanks were deployed between Kominternove and Zaichenko, to the east, while some 100 militiamen entered the village's centre in five armoured vehicles. OSCE observers were prevented from reaching the area, according to the Ukrainian military. The same sources claimed that the rebels fired 82 mm mortar rounds on Ukrainian positions from the seized village at night. Clashes with Ukrainian troops patrolling nearby were also reported.
- 24 December: The spokesman of the Ukrainian operational headquarters reported in the morning that pro-Russian troops had opened fire on 51 occasions in the Donbas region over the past 24 hours.
- 26 December: The spokesman of the Ukrainian operational headquarters reported in the morning that pro-Russian troops had opened fire on 66 occasions on 26 December and on seven occasions during the early hours of 27 December. Most incidents took place north and west of Horlivka. Pro-Russian armoured fighting vehicles and tanks attacked Zaitseve, which was also shelled with antitank rockets, antiaircraft cannons and 82 mm mortars. Ukrainian positions at Novhorodske were pounded with small arms fire, armoured fighting vehicles' cannons and 82 mm mortars from the western outskirts of Horlivka. Ukrainian troops at Luhanske received small arms fire, while automatic weapons and rocket propelled grenades were fired at Maiorsk. Troitske and Novoselivka were the target of SPG-9 grenades, armoured fighting vehicles' cannons, antiaircraft guns and 82 mm mortars. Around Donetsk city, the rebels fired small arms and rocket propelled grenades on Avdiivka, mortar rounds on Pisky and small arms, machine guns and rocket propelled grenades on Maryinka. In the region around Mariupol, the militias opened fire with antiaircraft guns and mortars on Ukrainian positions at Hnutove and Talakivka, west of Kominternove. The Ukrainian troops returned fire in the majority of the cases.
- 31 December: The Ukrainian army lost a total of 410 armoured vehicles this year, most of them in the siege of Donetsk airport and during the battle of Debaltseve.
