= Timeline of the war in Donbas =

The timeline for the war in Donbas is divided into the annual periods listed below:

- Timeline of the war in Donbas (2014)
- Timeline of the war in Donbas (2015)
- Timeline of the war in Donbas (2016)
- Timeline of the war in Donbas (2017)
- Timeline of the war in Donbas (2018)
- Timeline of the war in Donbas (2019)
- Timeline of the war in Donbas (2020)
- Timeline of the war in Donbas (2021)
- Timeline of the war in Donbas (2022)

== See also ==
- Outline of the Russo-Ukrainian War § Timelines
- Timeline of the 2022 Russian invasion of Ukraine
