= Timeline of the war in Donbas (2018) =

- 2014; 2015; 2016; 2017; 2018; 2019; 2020; 2021; 2022

This is the timeline of the war in Donbas for the year 2018.

== January–March ==
- 10 January: According to the information provided by the spokesman of the Ukrainian operational headquarters in the morning, pro-Russian troops had opened fire on 7 occasions on Ukrainian positions (including twice in Donetsk region and on 5 occasions in Luhansk region); the fire was returned once, in Luhansk region. The spokesman of the Ministry of Defence on issues related to ATO confirmed at noon that three Ukrainian servicemen were killed, another three were wounded, and one was injured in the Donbass region on 10 January. In the outskirts of Donetsk city, Verkhnyotoretske and Butivka mining complex were shelled with automatic grenade launchers. In the northern section of the demarcation line, rebel troops used small arms, rocket launchers, 82 mm and 120 mm mortars to attack Novoluhanske. Later in the night, Troitske and Luhanske were hit by 82 mm and 120 mm mortar volleys. Two Ukrainian servicemen were killed by an explosive device at Pisky, one Ukrainian soldier was killed by shelling at Novoluhanske, three Ukrainian servicemen were wounded near Novoluhanske and Verkhnyotoretske and another soldier was injured at Butivka mining complex. Donetsk People's Republic deputy Minister of Defense, Eduard Basurin, said to the press that in the area around Donetsk city, Spartak was the target of small arms, rocket launchers and 82 mm mortars, while in the region of Mariupol, Uzhivka, the villages of Sakhanka and Sosnovke came under 82 mm and 120 mm mortar fire. In the area of Horlivka, Holmivsky and Dolomitne were shelled by 82 mm mortars, 120 mm mortars, armoured fighting vehicles and 122 mm self-propelled guns. Ukrainian armoured fighting vehicles also engaged pro-Russian positions at Mihaylivka and Zaitseve, supported by infantry weapons and grenade launchers. Three civilian residents were wounded. The shelling resulted in a power outage in Holmivsky. Officials from the self-proclaimed Luhansk People's Republic reported that Ukrainian forces broke the ceasefire four times within the republic boundaries.
- 11 January: The ATO HQ reported in the morning that pro-Russian forces had opened fire on 9 occasions on Ukrainian positions (including on 5 occasions in Donetsk and on 4 occasions in Luhansk region) the fire was returned once, near Novoluhanske. The spokesman of the Ministry of Defence on issues related to ATO reported at noon that one Ukrainian serviceman was killed and four others were wounded and injured in the Donbass region. By the end of the day one Ukrainian serviceman was killed (in the course of mine clearance in Donetsk region), two were wounded (by shelling at Novozvanivka and Pisky), one was wounded during mine clearance, and one was wounded by the blast of an unidentified explosive device. Pro-Russian sources at Donetsk city reported 14 Ukrainian violations of the ceasefire in nine locations using small arms, grenade launchers, 82 mm mortars, 120 mm mortars, armoured personnel carriers, armoured fighting vehicles and heavy artillery.
- 12 January: According to the information provided by the spokesman of the Ukrainian operational headquarters in the morning, pro-Russian troops had opened fire on 10 occasions on Ukrainian positions (including on 3 occasions in Donetsk region and on 7 occasions in Luhansk region); the fire was returned on 5 occasions. The spokesman of the Ministry of Defence on issues related to ATO confirmed at noon that two Ukrainian servicemen were wounded in the Donbass region. In the surroundings of Donetsk city, small arms, heavy machine gun fire and antitank rockets hit Avdiivka. In the region of Mariupol, Vodiane and Shyrokyne came under 120 mm mortar fire. In the northern section of the demarcation line, pro-Russian armoured fighting vehicles engaged Ukrainian positions at Troitske for two hours, supported by ZU-23-2 anti-aircraft guns and 120 mm mortars. Luhanske became the target of infantry weapons and 82 mm mortar fire. Small arms fire was reported meanwhile at Stanytsia Luhanska and Katerinivka. By the end of the day two Ukrainian servicemen were wounded, near Troitske and near Katerynivka. Pro-Russian sources at Donetsk city reported 16 Ukrainian violations of the ceasefire in nine locations using small arms, grenade launchers, 82 mm mortars and 120 mm mortars. A residential area of Dokuchaievsk reported heavy damage.
- 19 January: The ATO HQ reported in the morning that pro-Russian forces had opened fire on 7 occasions on Ukrainian positions (including on 4 occasions in Donetsk region and on 3 occasions in Luhansk region); the fire was returned once. The spokesman of the Ministry of Defence on issues related to ATO reported at noon no casualties in the Donbass region on 19 January. In the main incidents, pro-Russian forces had attacked Ukrainian troops twice – at Luhanske with 82 mm mortars and at Stanytsia Luhanska with infantry weapons. Luhanske was attacked once again before dawn with heavy machine guns and 82 mm mortars. In the region of Mariupol, Shyrokyne and Vodiane came under 120 mm mortar fire. Pro-Russian authorities at Donetsk city reported four Ukrainian violations of the ceasefire in three locations using 82 mm mortars, 120 mm mortars and armoured fighting vehicles. In the area of Donetsk city, BMP-1 armoured vehicles carried out an intense attack on pro-Russian positions around Spartak, which were hit by forty 73 mm rounds. In the region of Mariupol, Sakhanka was shelled with 82 mm and 120 mm mortars, while pro-Russian troops at Pikuzy were engaged by BMP-1 armoured vehicles, which fired eighteen 73 mm rounds upon them.
- 7 February: According to the information provided by the spokesman of the Ukrainian operational headquarters in the morning, pro-Russian troops had opened fire on 17 occasions on Ukrainian positions on 7 February. The spokesman of the Ministry of Defence on issues related to ATO confirmed at noon that one Ukrainian serviceman was injured in the Donbass region on 7 February. Pro-Russian tanks engaged Ukrainian redoubts at Pisky, west of Donetsk city, supported by small arms and rocket launchers. In the region of Mariupol, Ukrainian troops at Shyrokyne became the target of heavy machine guns and grenade launchers. In the northern section of the demarcation line, 120 mm mortar volleys landed in Novozvanivka, Luhanske and Troitske. Popasna was shelled with 82 mm mortars. An Orlan-10 Russian drone was shot down in eastern Ukraine. Pro-Russian sources at Donetsk city reported 15 Ukrainian violations of the ceasefire in 12 different locations using small arms, snipers, automatic grenade launchers, 73 mm antitank recoilless rifles, 82 mm mortars, 120 mm mortars, armoured personnel carriers and armoured fighting vehicles. Officials from the self-proclaimed Luhansk People's Republic recorded six Ukrainian violations of the truce.
- 16 February: The ATO HQ reported in the morning that pro-Russian forces had opened fire on 20 occasions on Ukrainian positions (including once in Donetsk region and on 19 occasions in Luhansk region); the fire was returned on 8 occasions. The spokesman of the Ministry of Defence on issues related to ATO confirmed at noon that one Ukrainian serviceman was wounded and another injured in the Donbass region on 16 February. In the northern sector of the demarcation line, Ukrainian positions at Luhanske were repeatedly attacked by armoured fighting vehicles supported by heavy machine guns, rocket launchers, 82 mm and 120 mm mortars. Infantry weapons, 82 mm mortars and 120 mm mortars were used to engage Ukrainian forces at nearby Svitlodarsk and Troitske. Krymske came under small arms, rocket propelled grenade and 82 mm mortar fire. In the surroundings of Donetsk city, Ukrainian troops at Taramchuk were attacked with infantry weapons. Pro-Russian officials at Donetsk city reported eight Ukrainian violations of the ceasefire in four different locations using small arms, heavy machine guns, automatic grenade launchers, 73 mm antitank recoilless rifles, ZU-23-2 antiaircraft guns, 82 mm mortars, 120 mm mortars and tanks. Deputy minister of defence of the Donetsk People's Republic, Eduard Basurin, reported that Ukrainian members of the 57th motorized infantry brigade from Pisky slipped through the demarcation line, where they were met by pro-Russian forces. One Ukrainian soldier, identified as Vasily Zhemelinsky, was taken prisoner. Two Ukrainian soldiers were allegedly killed and two others wounded.
- 21 February: According to the information provided by the spokesman of the Ukrainian operational headquarters in the morning, pro-Russian troops had opened fire on 20 occasions on Ukrainian positions (including on 6 occasions in Donetsk region and on 14 occasions in Luhansk region); the fire was returned on 9 occasions. The spokesman of the Ministry of Defence on issues related to ATO confirmed at noon that three Ukrainian servicemen were wounded, one soldier was injured, and one died due to careless handling of a weapon in the Donbass region on 21 February. In the outskirts of Donetsk city, small arms fire was reported in Avdiivka. In the region of Mariupol, Vodiane was shelled with rocket launchers, 82 mm mortars and 120 mm mortars, while Lebedinske was hit by 82 mm mortar rounds. In the northern section of the demarcation line, pro-Russian armouredfighting vehicles attacked Troitske supported by 82 mm mortars, 120 mm mortars and 122 mm self-propelled artillery. Novooleksandrivka, Krymske and Katerinivka came under 82 mm mortar fire. Rebel forces fired small arms, heavy machine guns and grenade launchers at Ukrainian troops in Luhanske, Zaitseve, Zhelezne and Novoluhanske. Mayorsk was also shelled by ZU-23-2 antiaircraft guns.
- 22 February: The ATO HQ reported in the morning that pro-Russian forces had opened fire on 19 occasions on Ukrainian positions (including on 2 occasions in Donetsk region and on 17 occasions in Luhansk region); the fire was returned on 7 occasions. The spokesman of the Ministry of Defence on issues related to ATO confirmed at noon that one Ukrainian serviceman was killed and another wounded in the Donbass region on 22 February. Most incidents took place within the area of Svitlodarsk dam, in the northern front. Ukrainian positions at Troitske and Luhanske received intense fire from infantry weapons, 82 mm mortars and 120 mm mortars. Krymske and Katerinivka were struck by 82 mm mortar volleys. Ukrainian troops at Novoluhanske and Zaitseve were harassed with small arms and machine gun fire. Pro-Russian armoured vehicles engaged Ukrainian redoubts around Novooleksandrivka, supported by small arms fire. In the eastern area of operations, Hladosove and Lozove became the target of heavy machine guns and different grenade-launcher systems, while Novotroitske and Pisky were shelled with 82 mm and 120 mm mortars.
- 25 March: According to the information provided by the spokesman of the Ukrainian operational headquarters in the morning, pro-Russian troops had opened fire on 44 occasions on Ukrainian positions (including on 42 occasions in Donetsk region and twice in Luhansk region). The spokesman of the Ministry of Defence confirmed at noon that one Ukrainian serviceman was killed and another injured in the Donbass region on 25 March. Pro-Russian tanks engaged Ukrainian redoubts at Pisky, in the outskirts of Donetsk city, while 120 mm mortar volleys landed in nearby Opytne. Avdiivka, Butivka mining complex, Verkhnyotoretske, Kamianka, Marinka and Krasnohorivka were struck by small arms fire, heavy machine gun fire and antitank rockets. Pisky was shelled with 120 mm mortars at night, and sniper fire was reported at Marinka, Kamianka, Krasnohorivka and Butivka mining complex. Butivka mining complex was also fired at by armoured fighting vehicles. In the region of Mariupol, Lebedinske and Shyrokyne became the target of 120 mm mortars, while Talakivka came under 82 mm mortar fire. Rebel troops also fired at Talakivka, Shyrokyne, Bohdanivka, Hnutova, Novotroitske, Pavlopil and Vodiane. Ukrainian forces at Hnutove were engaged by armoured fighting vehicles and snipers harassed Ukrainian troops at Shyrokyne. In the northern section of the demarcation line, Novhorodske was hit by small arms fire, heavy machine gun fire and antitank rockets. Heavy machine guns were also fired at Troitske.
- 26 March: The spokesman of the Ukrainian operational headquarters reported in the morning that pro-Russian forces had opened fire on 47 occasions on Ukrainian positions (including on 40 occasions in Donetsk region and on 7 occasions in Luhansk region); the fire was returned on 10 occasions. The spokesman of the Ministry of Defence reported at noon no casualties in the Donbass region on 26 March. In the outskirts of Donetsk city, the Ukrainian stronghold of Avdiivka was hit by small arms fire, antitank rockets and 82 mm mortar rounds. Rebel forces fired rocket launchers at Kamianka and Butivka mining complex and heavy machine guns at Verkhnyotoretske and Pisky. Ukrainian troops at Marinka were harassed with small arms fire. In the region of Mariupol, the separatists attacked Marinka with infantry weapons and rocket launchers. Pavlopil was raked by heavy machine gun fire, while small arms fire was reported at Talakivka, Hnutove and Shyrokyne. In the northern sector of the demarcation line, pro-Russian armoured fighting vehicles, supported by heavy machine gun fire, engaged Ukrainian redoubts at Novhorodske. Luhanske and Troitske were targeted by heavy machine guns and rocket launchers, while Ukrainian forces at Stanytsia Luhanska came under small arms fire. A renewal of the ceasefire to come into effect on Good Friday (30 March) was agreed in Minsk by all involved parts.
- 28 March: The spokesman of the Ukrainian operational headquarters reported in the morning that pro-Russian forces had opened fire on 54 occasions on Ukrainian positions (including on 52 occasions in Donetsk region and twice in Luhansk region); the fire was returned on 28 occasions. The spokesman of the Ministry of Defence reported at noon no combat related casualties in the Donbass region on 28 March. In the area of Donetsk city, Pisky came under 82 mm mortar fire, and rocket propelled grenades landed in Avdiivka, Kamianka, Opytne and Pisky. Ukrainian troops at Marinka were harassed with heavy machine gun fire and with small arms fire at Butivka coal mine, while small arms fire was reported at Novomykhailivka. In the region of Mariupol, pro-Russian forces shelled Shyrokyne with rocket launchers and 122 mm self-propelled artillery. Intense fire was also reported at Pavlopil and Hnutove, where Ukrainian positions were attacked with heavy machine guns, rocket launchers, 82 mm mortars, 120 mm mortars and armoured fighting vehicles. Antitank rockets landed in Novotroitske and Talakivka. In the northern section of the demarcation line, Katerinivka came under heavy machine gun and 82 mm mortar fire, while heavy machine guns and rocket launchers were fired at Shchastya. One officer of the State Emergency Service was wounded by explosion of an unidentified explosive device near Avdiivka.
- 29 March: According to the information provided by the spokesman of the Ukrainian operational headquarters in the morning, pro-Russian forces had opened fire on 57 occasions on Ukrainian positions (including on 55 occasions in Donetsk region (53 of these were targeted) and twice in Luhansk region); the fire was returned on 38 occasions. By 11:00 am of 30 March 11 ceasefire violations were registered. The spokesman of the Ministry of Defence confirmed at noon that two Ukrainian servicemen were wounded and one soldier was injured in the Donbass region on 29 March. Around Donetsk city, Avdiivka, Opytne and Pisky were hit by small arms fire and antitank rockets. Heavy machine gun and small arms fire was reported at Verkhnyotoretske, Kamianka and Marinka. Ukrainian troops at Butivka mining complex also received small arms fire. In the region of Mariupol, armoured fighting vehicles engaged pro-Russian redoubts at Pavlopil, Pishchevik, Hnutove and Talakivka. Rebel forces fired small arms and 82 mm mortars at Shyrokyne. The separatists also fired heavy machine guns at Talakivka and small arms at Pavlopil. Vodiane, Hnutove, Novotroitske, Pishchevik and Lebedinske. In the northern sector of the demarcation line, Ukrainian troops at Artemove were harassed with small arms fire, while Luhanske became the target of heavy machine guns. Pro-Russian officials at Donetsk city reported six Ukrainian violations of the ceasefire in four locations using small arms, heavy machine guns, automatic grenade launchers, 73 mm antitank recoilless rifles, 82 mm mortars, 120 mm mortars, armoured personnel carriers, armoured fighting vehicles and 122 mm self-propelled artillery.

== April–June ==
- 10 April: According to the information provided by the spokesman of the Ukrainian operational headquarters in the morning, pro-Russian troops had opened fire on 64 occasions on Ukrainian positions (including on 60 occasions in Donetsk and on 4 occasions in Luhansk region); the fire was returned on 19 occasions. The spokesman of the Ministry of Defence confirmed at noon that four Ukrainian servicemen were wounded and one was injured in the Donbass region on 10 April. In the surroundings of Donetsk city, pro-Russian tanks engaged Ukrainian redoubts at Pisky and Kamianka. Rebel troops fired 120 mm mortars at Avdiivka, Pisky, Butivka coal mine and Kamianka. Butivka also came under 82 mm mortar fire. Infantry weapons and rocket launchers were employed to attack Ukrainian troops at Avdiivka, Kamianka, Krasnohorivka, Novotroitske, Butivka, Opytne and Marinka. Armoured fighting vehicles shelled Pisky, and antitank guided missiles were fired at Krasnohorivka. In the region of Mariupol, pro-Russian tanks opened fire on Ukrainian positions at Vodiane. Berdyansk, Lebedinske, Shyrokyne and Vodiane received 120 mm mortar fire, while Lebedinske and Talakivka were hit by 82 mm mortar rounds. Ukrainian troops at Lebedinskye Starohnativka, Talakivka, Hnutove, Vodiane, and Pavlopil came under small arms and heavy machine gun fire. Antitank guided missiles landed in Hnutove and Shyrokyne. In the northern section of the demarcation line, rebel forces fired small arms, heavy machine guns and 82 mm mortars at Novooleksandrivka. Armoured fighting vehicles opened fire at Luhanske. By the end of the day the number of registered ceasefire violations had risen to 64, three more Ukrainian soldiers were wounded and one was injured. Pro-Russian authorities told the press that Ukrainian forces pounded their forces at Volvo Center, Dokuchaievsk, Spartak, Trudivske, Zabicheve, Oktyabrivsky coal mine and Mineralne, in the surroundings of Donetsk city, and Sakhanka, Uzhivka, Pikuzy and Petrovske, in the region of Mariupol. The Ukrainian military used small arms, sniper rifles, heavy machine guns, automatic grenade launchers, 73 mm antitank recoilless rifles, 82 mm mortars, 120 mm mortars, BMP-1 and BMP-2 armoured vehicles.
- 12 April: According to the information provided by the spokesman of the Ukrainian operational headquarters in the morning, pro-Russian troops had opened fire on 66 occasions on Ukrainian positions (including on 54 occasions in Donetsk and on 12 occasions in Luhansk region); the fire was returned on 20 occasions. The spokesman of the Ministry of Defence confirmed at noon that one Ukrainian serviceman was killed and another wounded in the Donbass region on 12 April. One Ukrainian soldier was killed and another wounded. In the outskirts of Donetsk city, 120 mm mortar volleys struck Pisky, while Butivka mining complex came under 82 mm mortar fire. Ukrainian positions at Butivka and Opytne were also engaged by ZU-23-2 antiaircraft guns and armoured fighting vehicles. Marinka, Avdiivka, Opytne and Krasnohorivka became the target of infantry weapons and rocket launchers. Hostile snipers opened fire at Avdiivka and Pisky. In the region of Mariupol, Talakivka was hit by 82 mm mortar fire, while pro-Russian armoured fighting vehicles, supported by ZU-23-2 antiaircraft guns, opened fire on Ukrainian forces at Vodiane and Talakivka. The separatists fired small arms, heavy machine guns and grenade launchers at Lebedinske, Hnutove and Shyrokyne. Sniper fire was reported at Pavlopil. In the northern sector of the demarcation line, Troitske was shelled from 82 mm mortars, 120 mm mortars, ZU-23-2 antiaircraft guns and armoured fighting vehicles. Nearby Krymske was hit by 82 mm mortar fire. Ukrainian redoubts at Luhanske were shelled by ZU-23-2 antiaircraft guns and armoured fighting vehicles. Zaitseve, Novozvanivka, Artemove and Svitlodarsk were fired at from infantry weapons and antitank rocket launchers.
- 24 April: According to the information provided by the spokesman of the Ukrainian operational headquarters in the morning, pro-Russian troops had opened fire on 69 occasions on Ukrainian positions (including on 49 occasions in Donetsk and on 20 occasions in Luhansk region); the fire was returned on 30 occasions. The spokesman of the Ministry of Defence confirmed at noon that seven Ukrainian servicemen were wounded in action, two were injured in a combat related situation, and two were wounded by explosion of an IED the Donbass region on 24 April. In the area around Donetsk city, Novotroitske was hit by 120 mm mortar barrages. Rocket propelled grenades landed in Avdiivka and Marinka, and heavy machine gun fire was reported at Pervomaisk, Krasnohorivka and Butivka mining complex. Ukrainian troops at Kamianka, Novomykhailivka and Avdiivka were harassed with small arms fire. In the region of Mariupol, heavy shelling was reported at Lomakine, which became the target of antitank rockets, 82 mm mortars, 120 mm mortars and 122 mm self-prpeled artillery. Hnutove and Pyshchevik came under 120 mm mortar fire, and 82 mm mortar volleys struck Shyrokyne and Vodiane. Rocket launchers were fired at Hnutove, Talakivka, Lebedinske and Pyshchevik. Ukrainian positions at Pavlopil were raked with heavy machine gun fire, while armoured fighting vehicles attacked Vodiane, Hnutove and Pyshchevik. Small arms fire was reported at Vodiane and Talakivka, and sniper activity at Pavlopil, Talakivka and Shyrokyne. By the end of the day the number of registered ceasefire violations had risen to 69, five more Ukrainian soldiers were wounded and two were injured.
- 25 April: The spokesman of the Ukrainian operational headquarters reported in the morning that pro-Russian forces had opened fire on 76 occasions on Ukrainian positions (including on 51 occasions in Donetsk region and on 25 occasions in Luhansk region); the fire was returned on 30 occasions. By 9:00 am of 26 April 6 ceasefire violations were registered, exclusively in Donetsk region. The spokesman of the Ministry of Defence confirmed at noon that eight Ukrainian servicemen were wounded in action and two soldiers were injured in the Donbass region on 25 April. In the area of Donetsk city, rebel forces fired rocket propelled grenades and 120 mm mortars at Ukrainian positions at Verkhnyotoretske and Butivka mining complex. Avdiivka became the target of small arms, rocket launchers and 82 mm mortars. Armoured fighting vehicles attacked Butivka mining complex, while nearby Kamianka was hit by antitank rockets. Heavy machine gun fire was reported at Krasnohorivka, Nevelske, Slavne, Verkhnyotoretske and Pisky. In the region of Mariupol, Hnutove was struck by small arms fire, heavy machine gun fire, antitank rockets, antitank guided missiles and 120 mm mortar rounds. Antitank guided missiles also hit Talakivka. Armoured fighting vehicles opened fire at Talakivka and Bohdanivka. Heavy machine gun fire was reported at Pavlopil, and small arms fire at Shyrokyne, Lebedinske and Pyshchevik. In the northern section of the demarcation line, the village of Novoluhanske witnesses heavy shelling. The Ukrainian stronghold was pounded by 120 mm mortars, tanks, 152 mm artillery and BM-21 "Grad" multiple rocket launchers. Nearby Svitlodarsk was shelled by 82 mm mortars and 152 mm self-propelled guns. Pro-Russian tanks engaged Ukrainian positions at Novoselivka, supported by small arms, grenade launchers, 82 mm mortars and armoured fighting vehicles. Novozvanivka, meanwhile, was fired at from heavy machine guns, rocket launchers, 120 mm mortars and armoured fighting vehicles. Troitske came under 82 mm and 120 mm mortar fire, and 122 mm artillery volleys hit Zaitseve. Armoured fighting vehicles opened fire on Ukrainian positions at Luhanske and Novhorodske supported by 82 mm mortars, 120 mm mortars and 122 mm self-propelled artillery. Ukrainian troops at Malinove were harassed with small arms fire. By the end of the day the number of registered ceasefire violations had risen to 76, four more Ukrainian servicemen were wounded and two more injured.
- 6 May: According to the information provided by the press-centre of the JFO headquarters in the morning, pro-Russian troops had opened fire on 80 occasions on Ukrainian positions (including on 57 occasions in Donetsk and on 23 occasions in Luhansk region); the fire was returned on more than 30 occasions. 12 ceasefire violations were registered during the first hours of 7 May. The spokesman of the Ministry of Defence reported at noon that three Ukrainian serviceman were wounded in action and one was injured in the Donbass region on 6 May. One Ukrainian soldier was killed and two were wounded by explosion of an IED at Horlivka. sources from the JFO headquarters told the press that one Ukrainian soldier was killed and two others wounded in a skirmish that took place near Horlivka, when pro-Russian troops ambushed a Ukrainian mechanized patrol using small arms and an Improvised explosive device. Three attackers were killed by return fire. One Ukrainian armoured fighting vehicle was knocked down. In other incidents, around Donetsk city 82 mm mortar volleys hit Pisky, Avdiivka and Verkhnyotoretske. Pro-Russian armoured fighting vehicles opened fire at Butivka mining complex. Rebel troops fired small arms, heavy machine guns and rocket launchers at Nevelske, Pisky, Avdiivka, Opytne, Verkhnyotoretske, Kamianka, Krasnohorivka, Pervomaisk, Marinka and Butivka. Hostile snipers harassed Ukrainian troops at Opytne and Nevelske. In the region of Mariupol, Talakivka, Shyrokyne, Pavlopil, Vodiane, Hnutove and Pischevyk became the target of infantry weapons and rocket launchers. Talakivka was fired at from armoured fighting vehicles. Sniper fire was reported at Vodiane. Pro-Russian tanks launched a sustained attack on Krymske, in the northern section of the demarcation line. The separatists also employed tanks and armoured fighting vehicles to engage Ukrainian forces at Troitske, and heavy shelling was reported at Luhanske, which was pounded with 82 mm mortars, 120 mm mortars and 122 mm self-propelled artillery. Krymske, Nyzhne, Svitlodarsk, Zaitseve and Troitske came under 82 mm and 120 mm mortar fire. The rebels used infantry weapons and grenade launchers to harass Ukrainian forces at Orikhove, Novhorodske, Novozvanivka, Nyzhne, Troitske, Zalizne, Krymske and Luhanske. Ukrainian positions at Novotoshkivke were riddled by ZU-23-2 antiaircraft guns, and small arms fire was reported at Stanytsia Luhanska.
- 9 May: The press-centre of the JFO headquarters reported in the morning that pro-Russian forces had opened fire on 73 occasions on Ukrainian positions (including on 57 occasions in Donetsk region and on 16 occasions in Luhansk region); the fire was returned on 33 occasions. The spokesman of the Ministry of Defence reported at noon that one Ukrainian serviceman was killed, five others were wounded, and one soldier was injured in the Donbass region on 9 May. In the environs of Donetsk city, rebel forces fired small arms, heavy machine guns and rocket launchers at Avdiivka, Verkhnyotoretske, Kamianka, Krasnohorivka, Marinka, Nevelske, Novotroitske, Opytne, Pisky and Butivka mining complex. Avdiivka, Verkhnyotoretske, Novotroitske, Opytne and Pisky came under 82 and 120 mm mortar fire. In the region of Mariupol, Vodiane, Hnutove, Pavlopil, Pyshchevik, Starohnativka, Novohnativka, Shyrokyne and Bohdanivka became the target of infantry weapons and grenade launchers. Starohnativka and Novohnativka came under 122 self-propelled artillery fire, while 82 and 120 mm mortar volleys landed in Bohdanivka. In the northern section of the demarcation line, pro-Russian armoured fighting vehicles engaged Ukrainian positions around Zaitseve and Luhanske, supported by small arms and heavy machine gun fire. Krymske, Mayorsk, Novozvanivka Artemova, Prichepilivka and Troitske were shelled with 82 and 120 mm mortars.
- 12 May: According to the information provided by the press-centre of the JFO headquarters in the morning, pro-Russian troops had opened fire on 73 occasions on Ukrainian positions (including on 46 occasions in Donetsk and on 27 occasions in Luhansk region); the fire was returned on 40 occasions. By morning of 13 May twelve ceasefire violations were registered. The spokesman of the Ministry of Defence reported at noon that one Ukrainian serviceman was killed in action and six were wounded in the Donbass region on 12 May. One Ukrainian serviceman was killed, six were wounded. In the outskirts of Donetsk city, Kamianka, Avdiivka and Verkhnyotoretske came under 82 mm and 120 mm mortar fire. The rebels also used infantry weapons and rocket launchers to attack Ukrainian positions at Krasnohorivka, Marinka, Opytne, Avdiivka, Kamianka, Verkhnyotoretske, Nevelske and Butivka mining complex. In the region of Mariupol, Talakivka, Pavlopil, Vodiane, Shyrokyne, Hnutove and Pyshchevik were struck by small arms fire, machine gun fire and antitank rockets. In the northern sector of the demarcation line, 122 mm self-propelled artillery shelled Novozvanivka, Svitlodarsk and Troitske, Troitske was later the target of 120 mm mortars. Rebel forces also fired 82 mm and 120 mm mortars at Ukrainian redoubts around Zalizne, Novozvanivka, Novhorodske and Zaitseve. Ukrainian forces at Prichepilivka, Krymske, Troitske, Zhovte, Novhorodske, Mayorsk, Novoselivka, Novozvanivka and Zaitseve. Pro-Russian sources at Donetsk city reported 33 Ukrainian violations of the ceasefire in 13 locations using small arms, grenade launchers, 82 mm mortars, 120 mm mortars, armoured personnel carriers, armoured fighting vehicles and tanks. Near Horlivka, a Ukrainian attempt to break through the demarcation line from Yuzhne on 11 May ended with the withdrawal of Ukrainian forces supported by mortars and tanks. Two civilian were confirmed wounded. Officials from the self-proclaimed Luhansk People's Republic reported that Ukrainian forces broke the ceasefire seven times within the republic boundaries. The Ukrainian military employed heavy machine guns, rocket launchers, 73 mm antitank recoilless rifles, 82 mm mortars, 120 mm mortars and 122 mm self-propelled guns to attack pro-Russian positions at Kalynove, Zholobok and Znamianka
- 17 May: According to the information provided by the press-centre of the JFO headquarters in the morning, pro-Russian troops had opened fire on 66 occasions on Ukrainian positions. The spokesman of the Ministry of Defence confirmed at noon that two Ukrainian servicemen were killed in action and four were wounded in the Donbass region on 16 May. In the area around Donetsk city, 82 mm and 120 mm mortar barrages hit Ukrainian redoubts at Opytne. Avdiivka, Kamianka, Krasnohorivka, Marinka, Taramchuk, Nevelske, Opytne and Pisky became the target of small arms, heavy machine guns and rocket launchers. In the region of Mariupol, Vodiane and Hnutove were shelled with 120 mm mortars and 122 mm artillery. Starohnativka and Novohnativka, meanwhile, were pounded by 82 mm and 120 mm mortar fire. Rebel troops fired infantry weapons and grenade launchers at Ukrainian positions around Pavlopil, Shyrokyne, Pyshchevik, Lebedinske, Novohnativka, Starohnativka and Hnutove. In the northern section of the demarcation line, Krymske was shelled with 152 mm self-propelled artillery; the same area was also targeted by infantry weapons, rocket launchers and 82 mm mortars. Zaitseve, Zalizne, Novoluhanske and Troitske were pounded by 122 mm artillery volleys. Rebel forces fired small arms, heavy machine guns and rocket launchers at Novozvanivka, Novotoshvka, Novhorodske and Prichepilivka.
- 7 June: According to the information provided by the press-centre of the JFO headquarters in the morning pro-Russian forces had opened fire on 37 occasions on Ukrainian positions (including on 23 occasions in Donetsk region and on 14 occasions in Luhansk region); The spokesman of the Ministry of Defence confirmed at noon that four Ukrainian servicemen were wounded in the Donbass region on 7 June. In the outskirts of Donetsk city, Ukrainian forces at Opytne were engaged by snipers and armoured fighting vehicles. The separatists fired heavy machine guns and rocket propelled grenades at Marinka, Nevelske, Avdiivka, Pisky, Novotroitske, Novoselivka and Kamianka. In the region of Mariupol, heavy shelling was reported at Vodiane, which became the target of 120 mm mortars and 122 self-propelled guns. Lebedinske came under 82 mm and 120 mm mortar fire. Ukrainian troops at Shyrokyne, Hnutove, Vodiane and Pavlopil were fired at from heavy machine guns and rocket launchers. Pro-Russian tanks launched a sustained attack on Ukrainian redoubts Novotoshkivke, in the northern section of the demarcation line, supported by heavy machine guns, rocket launchers, 82 mm mortars, 120 mm mortars, armoured fighting vehicles and 122 mm self-propelled artillery. The nearby strongholds of Zaitseve and Krymske were shelled with 82 mortars. Ukrainian positions at Krymske, Novozvanivka, Luhanske, Lozove and Troitske came under fire from small arms, heavy machine guns and armoured fighting vehicles.
- 8 June: The press-centre of the JFO headquarters reported in the morning that pro-Russian forces had opened fire on 38 occasions on Ukrainian positions (including on 24 occasions in Donetsk and on 14 occasions in Luhansk region); the fire was returned on 17 occasions. The spokesman of the Ministry of Defence confirmed at noon that six Ukrainian servicemen were wounded in the Donbass region on 8 June. Around Donetsk city, pro-Russian forces opened fire on Ukrainian positions at Krasnohorivka and Marinka with small arms, heavy machine guns and rocket launchers. Sniper fire was reported at Krasnohorivka. In the region of Mariupol, 120 mm mortar rounds hit Vodiane and Shyrokyne. The separatists used infantry weapons and grenade launchers to attack Ukrainian positions at Pavlopil, Marinka and Hnutove. In the northern sector of the demarcation line, pro-Russian armoured fighting vehicles engaged Ukrainian forces at Krymske and Novotoshkivke, supported by small arms, heavy machine guns, rocket launchers, 82 mm and 120 mm mortars. Infantry weapons, grenade launchers, 82 mm and 120 mm mortars were also fired at Zalizne, Katerinivka, Luhanske and Zaitseve.
- 15 June: According to the information provided by the press-centre of the JFO headquarters in the morning pro-Russian forces had opened fire on 36 occasions on Ukrainian positions (including on 24 occasions in Donetsk region and on 12 occasions in Luhansk region); the fire was returned on 15 occasions. The spokesman of the Ministry of Defence reported at noon that one Ukrainian serviceman was wounded in the Donbass region on 15 June. In the outskirts of Donetsk city, Ukrainian troops Avdiivka and Marinka became the target of small arms, heavy machine guns and rocket launchers. In the region of Mariupol, Bohdanivka, Vodiane, Lebedinske and Talakivka were shelled with 82 mm mortars, 120 mm mortars and 122 mm self-propelled artillery. Pro-Russian armoured fighting vehicles opened fire on Ukrainian positions at Hnutove, while infantry weapons and grenade launchers were used to harass Ukrainian forces at Pavlopil, Shyrokyne, Talakivka, Vodiane, Lebedinske, Hnutove and Chermalyk. In the northern sector of the demarcation line, armoured fighting vehicles engaged Ukrainian positions near Luhanske, while 82 mm mortar rounds landed in Novotoshkivke and Troitske. Separatist forces opened fire on Ukrainian positions at Svitlodarsk, Luhanske, Novhorodske, Zaitseve, Novotoshkivke and Troitske using small arms, heavy machine guns and rocket launchers. Hours later, armoured fighting vehicles launched attacks on Ukrainian positions at Zaitseve, Novotoshkivke and Zolote.
- 29 June: According to the information provided by the press-centre of the JFO headquarters in the morning pro-Russian forces had opened fire on 34 occasions on Ukrainian positions (including on 20 occasions in Donetsk region and on 14 occasions in Luhansk region); the fire was returned on 18 occasions. By morning of 30 June three ceasefire violations were registered with no casualties on the Ukrainian side; the fire was returned twice. The spokesman of the Ministry of Defence confirmed at noon that two Ukrainian servicemen were wounded in the Donbass region on 29 June. In the outskirts of Donetsk city, separatist forces fired small arms, heavy machine guns and rocket launchers at Ukrainian positions near Verkhnyotoretske, Avdiivka, Marinka and Pisky. Sniper fire was reported at Nevelske. In the region of Mariupol, pro-Russian armoured fighting vehicles engaged Ukrainian redoubts at Pavlopil. Hnutove and Berdyansk were hit by 120 mm mortars. Ukrainian forces at Lebedinske, Shyrokyne, Vodiane, Pavlopil, and Novomihaylivka became the target of infantry weapons and rocket launchers. In the northern section of the demarcation line, pro-Russian tanks attacked Ukrainian redoubts at Novotoshkivke for the second consecutive day, while armoured fighting vehicles opened fire on Maiske. Luhanske and Krymske were shelled with 82 mm mortars, and Luhanske, Krymske, Svitlodarsk, Novhorodske and Novozvanivka were fired at from small arms, heavy machine guns and grenade launchers.

== July–September ==
- 24 July: According to the information provided by the spokesman of the Ukrainian operational headquarters in the morning, pro-Russian troops had opened fire on 33 occasions on Ukrainian positions (including on 19 occasions in Donetsk and on 14 occasions in Luhansk region); the fire was returned on 10 occasions. By morning of 25 July four ceasefire violations were registered with no casualties on the Ukrainian side. The spokesman of the Ministry of Defence reported at noon no casualties in the Donbass region on 24 July. In the surroundings of Donetsk city, 122 mm self-propelled artillery firing from Dokuchaievsk hit Ukrainian positions at Novotroitske. This marked the first use of artillery by pro-Russian sources in weeks. Infantry weapons and rocket launchers were employed to harass Ukrainian troops at Avdiivka, Marinka, Opytne, Pisky and Novotroitske. In the region of Mariupol, heavy shelling was reported at Lebedinske, which became the target of 82 mm mortars, 120 mm mortars and 122 mm self-propelled artillery. Nearby Vodiane became the target of 120 mm mortars and antitank guided missiles. Pro-Russian forces also fired small arms, heavy machine guns and grenade launchers at Shyrokyne, Talakivka, Pavlopil and Lebedinske. In the northern sector of the demarcation line, pro-Russian armoured fighting vehicles engaged Ukrainian forces at Krymske and Luhanske. Pro-Russian infantry attacked Ukrainian redoubts at Yuzhne, Novhorodske, Zalizne, Luhanske and Krymske.
- 27 July: According to the information provided by the press-centre of the JFO headquarters in the morning pro-Russian forces had opened fire on 34 occasions on Ukrainian positions (including on 21 occasions in Donetsk region and on 13 occasions in Luhansk region); the fire was returned on several occasions. By morning of 28 July four ceasefire violations were registered with no casualties on the Ukrainian side. The spokesman of the Ministry of Defence confirmed at noon that one Ukrainian serviceman was killed in the Donbass region on 27 July. In the areas around Donetsk city and Mariupol, 82 mm and 120 mm mortar volleys landed in Lebedinske and Vodiane. Small arms, heavy machine guns and rocket launchers were fired at Avdiivka, Pavlopil, Hnutove, Lebedinske, Shyrokyne, Vodiane, Marinka, Krasnohorivka and Novomykhailivka. In the northern section of the demarcation line, pro-Russian armoured fighting vehicles engaged Ukrainian positions at Krymske, while infantry weapons and grenade launchers were employed to harass Ukrainian troops at Mayorsk, Zhovte, Novotoshkivke and Zolote.
- 29 July: According to the information provided by the spokesman of the Ukrainian operational headquarters in the morning, pro-Russian troops had opened fire on 40 occasions on Ukrainian positions (including on 28 occasions in Donetsk and on 12 occasions in Luhansk region); the fire was returned on several occasions. By morning of 31 July four ceasefire violations were registered with no casualties on the Ukrainian side. The spokesman of the Ministry of Defence confirmed at noon that three Ukrainian servicemen were wounded in action in the Donbass region on 30 July. In the outskirts of Donetsk city and in the region of Mariupol, pro-Russian troops fired infantry weapons and rocket launchers at Shyrokyne, Avdiivka, Marinka, Hnutove, Opytne, Novomykhailivka, Lebedinske and Pavlopil. In the northern sector of the demarcation line, the same kind of weapons were used to harass Ukrainian troops at Yuzhne, Novhorodske and Novoselivka.
- 31 July: According to the information provided by the press-centre of the JFO headquarters in the morning pro-Russian forces had opened fire on 36 occasions on Ukrainian positions (including on 21 occasions in Donetsk region and on 15 occasions in Luhansk region); the fire was returned on several occasions. The spokesman of the Ministry of Defence confirmed at noon that one Ukrainian serviceman was wounded in the Donbass region on the last day of July. In the area around Donetsk city and in the region of Mariupol, Opytne, Hnutove, Vodiane, Krasnohorivka, Marinka, Avdiivka, Talakivka, Lebedinske, Novomikhailovka, Pavlopil and Pisky became the target of infantry weapons and rocket launchers. In the northern sector of the demarcation line, the same kind of weapons were used to harass Ukrainian troops at Krymske, Zaitseve, Luhanske and Svitlodarsk. Pro-Russian authorities at Donetsk city said that Ukrainian forces broke the ceasefire once, when 82 mm mortar rounds landed in Spartak, near Donetsk airport. According to local sources, the Ukrainian military broke the ceasefire three times within the borders of the self-styled Luhansk People's Republic. The Ukrainian military employed small arms, heavy machine guns, automatic grenade launchers, antitank rocket launchers and BMP-1 armoured vehicles to attack pro-Russian positions at Zholobok and Lozove.
- 8 August: According to the information provided by the press-centre of the JFO headquarters in the morning pro-Russian forces had opened fire on 44 occasions on Ukrainian positions (including on 26 occasions in Donetsk region and on 18 occasions in Luhansk region); the fire was returned on 15 occasions. The spokesman of the Ministry of Defence confirmed reported at noon that one Ukrainian soldier was killed and three Ukrainian servicemen were wounded in the Donbass region on 8 August; one Ukrainian soldier went missing in a clash between the warring parties. In the area of Donetsk city and in the region of Mariupol, Avdiivka became the target of small arms, heavy machine guns, rocket launchers and 82 mm mortars. Pro-Russian armoured fighting vehicles attacked Ukrainian positions at nearby Krasnohorivka. The separatists fired infantry weapons and grenade launchers at Ukrainian troops around Vodiane, Hnutove, Lebedinske, Marinka, Novomykhailivka, Novoselivka, Pavlopil and Shyrokyne. In the northern sector of the demarcation line, Ukrainian scouts were ambushed by pro-Russian infantry near Mayorsk. Pro-Russian armoured fighting vehicles, meanwhile, engaged Ukrainian redoubts at Krymske supported by 82 mm mortar fire. Ukrainian troops at Zaitseve, Zolote, Novoluhanske, Yuzhne, Luhanske and Novozvanivka were harassed with small arms fire, heavy machine gun fire and rocket propelled grenades.
- 9 August: According to the information provided by the spokesman of the Ukrainian operational headquarters in the morning, pro-Russian troops had opened fire on 45 occasions on Ukrainian positions (including on 24 occasions in Donetsk and on 21 occasions in Luhansk region); the fire was returned on several occasions. The spokesman of the Ministry of Defence confirmed at noon that one Ukrainian serviceman was killed and two were wounded in action in the Donbass region on 9 August. In the area around Donetsk city and in the region of Mariupol, 82 mm mortar volleys landed in Hnutove and Lebedinske. Pro-Russian forces opened fire with infantry weapons and rocket launchers at Hnutove, Bodanivka, Starohnativka, Novomykhailivka, Vodiane, Chermalyk, Shyrokyne, Krasnohorivka, Marinka and Pavlopil. In the northern section of the demarcation line, Novoluhanske was shelled with 82 mm mortars. Small arms, heavy machine guns and grenade launchers were fired at Novozvanovka, Majororsk, Novotoshkovskoe, Krymske, Novolugansk, Zaitseve and Troitske. Ukrainian troops at Stanytsia Luhanske were harassed with small arms fire from pro-Russian positions at Knyaz Igor memorial.
- 12 August: According to the information provided by the press-centre of the JFO headquarters in the morning pro-Russian forces had opened fire on 57 occasions on Ukrainian positions (including on 33 occasions in Donetsk region and on 24 occasions in Luhansk region); the fire was returned on 27 occasions. The spokesman of the Ministry of Defence confirmed at noon that two Ukrainian soldiers were wounded in the Donbass region on 12 August. In the area around Donetsk city and in the region of Mariupol, heavy shelling was reported at Hnutove, which became the target of 82 mm mortars, 120 mm mortars and 122 mm self-propelled artillery, while Vodiane and Lebedinske came under 82 mm and 120 mm mortar fire. Ukrainian positions at Hnutove were also attacked by armoured fighting vehicles. Light weapons were used to harass Ukrainian troops at Avdiivka, Marinka, Nikolaevka, Novomykhailvka, Novotroitske, Opytne, Pavlopil, Chermalyk and Shyrokyne. Sniper fire was reported at Nikolaevka. In the northern sector of the demarcation line, Luhanske and Mayorsk were shelled with 120 mm mortars, while Krymske and Zaitseve came under 82 mm mortar fire. Pro-Russian armoured fighting vehicles engaged Ukrainian positions at Yuzhne. Infantry weapons and rocket launchers were fired at Zolote, Yuzhne, Svitlodarsk, Novotoshkivke and Novoluhanske. The OSCE mission announced that their monitors had spotted "four distinct electronic warfare systems" near Chornukhyne, in an area controlled by the self-proclaimed Luhansk People's Republic. The Russian-made devices were identified by an OSCE drone as "Leer-3 RB-341V, 1L269 Krasukha, and RB-109A Bylina units as well as the mobile anti-drone system Repellent-1".
- 14 August: According to the information provided by the press-centre of the JFO headquarters in the morning pro-Russian forces had opened fire on 46 occasions on Ukrainian positions (including on 31 occasions in Donetsk region and on 15 occasions in Luhansk region); the fire was returned on several occasions. The spokesman of the Ministry of Defence confirmed reported at noon that one Ukrainian soldier was killed and three Ukrainian servicemen were wounded in the Donbass region on 14 August. In the outskirts of Donetsk city and in the region of Mariupol, 122 mm artillery barrages were fired at the Ukrainian strongholdsof Hnutove, Vodiane and Shyrokyne. Vodiane was also shelled with 82 mm and 120 mm mortars; 82 mm mortar volleys landed meanwhile in Chermalyk and Lebedinske. Infantry weapons and grenade launchers were used to harass Ukrainian troops at Krasnohorivka, Opytne, Marinka, Novotroitske, Pisky, Pavlopil, Chermalyk, Hnutove, Vodiane, Shyrokyne and Lebedinske. In the northern section of the demarcation line, Krymske came under attack from heavy machine guns, rocket launchers, 82 mm mortars, 120 mm mortars, armoured fighting vehicles and 152 mm self-propelled artillery. Zaitseve was hit by 82 mm mortar rounds, and Mayorsk came under 120 mm mortar fire. Small arms, heavy machine guns and antitank rocket launchers were fired at Ukrainian positions around Zaitseve, Troitske, Zolote, Svitlodarsk and Mayorsk.
- 12 September: According to the information provided by the spokesman of the Ukrainian operational headquarters in the morning, pro-Russian troops had opened fire on 38 occasions on Ukrainian positions (including on 21 occasions in Donetsk and on 17 occasions in Luhansk region); the fire was returned on several occasions. The spokesman of the Ministry of Defence confirmed at noon that two Ukrainian servicemen were wounded in action in the Donbass region on 12 September. In the surroundings of Donetsk city and Mariupol, Chermalyk and Lebedinske came under 82 mm mortar fire. The separatists fired infantry weapons and rocket launchers at Vodiane, Chermalyk, Krasnohorivka, Shyrokyne, Novotroitske, Starohnativka, Berezove, Lebedinske, Hnutove and Pavlopil. In the northern sector of the demarcation line, Novoluhanske, Svitlodarsk, Novotoshkivske, Zolote and Krymske.
- 13 September: The spokesman of the Ukrainian operational headquarters reported in the morning, that pro-Russian troops had opened fire on 37 occasions on Ukrainian positions (including on 27 occasions in Donetsk region and on 10 occasions in Luhansk region); the fire was returned on several occasions. The spokesman of the Ministry of Defence confirmed at noon that one Ukrainian serviceman was wounded in action in the Donbass region on 13 September. In the area around Donetsk city and in the region of Mariupol, Vodiane and Chermalik were hit by 120 mm mortars; 82 mm mortar volleys landed also in Vodiane and Hnutove. Pro-Russian troops fired infantry weapons and rocket launchers at Starohnativka, Berezove, Shyrokyne, Vodiane, Verkhnyotoretske, Pisky, Marinka, Krasnohorivka, Avdiivka, Hranitne, Lebedinske, Pavlopil, Chermalyk and Hnutove. In the northern section of the demarcation line, Krymske came under 120 mm mortar fire. Pro-Russian armoured fighting vehicles engaged Ukrainian redoubts at Troitske and Krymske, while small arms, heavy machine guns and grenade launchers were used to harass Ukrainian troops at Novotoshkivka, Krymske and Luhanske.
- 23 September: The spokesman of the Ukrainian operational headquarters reported in the morning, that pro-Russian troops had opened fire on 35 occasions on Ukrainian positions (including on 16 occasions in Donetsk region and on 19 occasions in Luhansk region); the fire was returned on 12 occasions. The spokesman of the Ministry of Defence confirmed at noon that three Ukrainian servicemen were wounded in the Donbass region on 23 September. In the surroundings of Donetsk city and in the region of Mariupol, pro-Russian forces launched a sustained attack on Hnutove using small arms, heavy machine guns, automatic grenade launchers and armoured fighting vehicles. Antitank rockets hit Ukrainian redoubts at Avdiivka and Chermalyk. In the northern section of the demarcation line, 82 mm and 120 mm mortar volleys hit Yuzhne. Shumy, Mayorsk came under 82 mm mortar fire. Luhanske was fired at from 73 mm antitank recoilless rifles and 82 mm mortars. Light weapons were fired at Ukrainian positions at Pisky, Vodiane, Lebedinske, Avdiivka and Pavlopil.
- 28 September: According to the information provided by the spokesman of the Ukrainian operational headquarters in the morning, pro-Russian troops had opened fire on 34 occasions on Ukrainian positions (including on 18 occasions in Donetsk and on 16 occasions in Luhansk region); the fire was returned on several occasions. The spokesman of the Ministry of Defence confirmed at noon that four Ukrainian servicemen were wounded in action in the Donbass region on 28 September. In the environs of Donetsk city and Mariupol, Hnutove came under intense attack by pro-Russian forces, which employed ZU-23-2 antiaircraft guns, 82 mm mortars, 120 mm mortars, armoured fighting vehicles and 122 self-propelled artillery. Pavlopil, Marinka, Avdiivka, Novotroitske and Lebedinske became the target of infantry weapons and rocket launchers. In the northern section of the demarcation line, 82 mm and 120 mm mortar barrages hit Novoluhanske, while pro-Russian armoured fighting vehicles engaged Ukrainian redoubts at Luhanske. Zolote received fire from ZU-23-2 antiaircraft guns, and Novotoshkivske, Zolote, Luhanske, Katerinivka, Troitske, Stanytsia Luhanska, Novoluhanske and Krimske were hit by small arms fire, machine gun fire and antitank rockets.

== October–December ==
- 2 October: According to the information provided by the spokesman of the Ukrainian operational headquarters in the morning, pro-Russian troops had opened fire on 34 occasions on Ukrainian positions (including on 16 occasions in Donetsk region and on 18 occasions in Luhansk region); the fire was returned on more than 20 occasions. The spokesman of the Ministry of Defence confirmed at noon that one Ukrainian serviceman (born in 1981) was killed and two were wounded in action in the Donbass region on the second day of October. In the outskirts of Donetsk city and in the region of Mariupol, 82 mm mortar round landed in Starohnativka and Lebedinske. Separatist forces used small arms, heavy machine guns and rocket launchers to harass Ukrainian troops at Vodiane, Lebedinske, Chermalyk, Starohnativka, Pavlopil, Novotroitske, Hnutove, Avdiivka, Bohdanivka, Shyrokyne, Krasnohorivka and Verkhnyotoretske. In the northern section of the demarcation line, 82 mm and 120 mm mortars were fired at Orekhove, while 82 mm mortar volleys struck Krymske, Novotoshkivke and Luhanske. Infantry weapons and rocket launchers were fired at Katerinivka, Luhanske, Orekhove, Novozvanivka, Novotoshkivke and Krymske.
- 8 October: According to the information provided by the spokesman of the Ukrainian operational headquarters in the morning, pro-Russian troops had opened fire on 36 occasions on Ukrainian positions (including on 23 occasions in Donetsk region and on 13 occasions in Luhansk region); the fire was returned on 17 occasions. The spokesman of the Ministry of Defence confirmed at noon that three Ukrainian servicemen were wounded in action in the Donbass region on 8 October. In the environs of Donetsk city and in the region of Mariupol, pro-Russian armoured fighting vehicles, supported by 120 mm mortar fire, grenade launchers and infantry weapons attacked Ukrainian positions at Lebedinske and Vodiane. Hnutove, Pavlopil, Avdiivka, Marinka, Krasnohorivka, Novomikhailivka and Piski became the target of small arms, heavy machine guns and rocket launchers. in the northern section of the demarcation line, Luhanske was struck by 82 mm and 120 mm mortar volleys, while Travneve and Novotoshkivke were shelled with 82 mm mortars. Ukrainian forces at Troitske and Novotoshkivke were engaged by armoured fighting vehicles. The separatists fired ZU-23-2 antiaircraft guns at Ukrainian redoubts around Shyrokyne. Ukrainian troops became the target of infantry weapons and grende launchers at Katerinivka, Krymske, Luhanske and Stepne.
- 9 October: The spokesman of the Ukrainian operational headquarters reported in the morning, that pro-Russian troops had opened fire on 39 occasions on Ukrainian positions (including on 25 occasions in Donetsk region and on 14 occasions in Luhansk region). The spokesman of the Ministry of Defence confirmed at noon that one Ukrainian serviceman was killed and two others had suffered minor injuries in action in the Donbass region on 9 October. In the outskirts of Donetsk city and in the region of Mariupol, heavy shelling was reported on Ukrainian positions at Hnutove, Vodiane and Lebedinske, which became the target of 82 mm mortars, 120 mm mortars and 122 mm self-propelled artillery. Infantry weapons were used to harass Ukrainian troops at Syiroyine, Pavlopil, Lebedinske, Hnutove, Krasnohorivka and Marinka. in the northern sector of the demarcation line, 152 mm artillery volleys landed in Novotoshkivke, while Luhanske and Novoluhanske became the target of 82 mm and 120 mm mortars. Antitank guided missiles were fired at Ukrainian positions around Zolote.
- 15 October: The spokesman of the Ukrainian operational headquarters reported in the morning, that pro-Russian troops had opened fire on 37 occasions on Ukrainian positions (including on 28 occasions in Donetsk region and on 9 occasions in Luhansk region); the fire was returned on 14 occasions. The spokesman of the Ministry of Defence confirmed at noon that one Ukrainian serviceman (born in 1991) was killed and another three were wounded in action in the Donbass region on 15 October.
- 1 November: According to the information provided by the spokesman of the Ukrainian operational headquarters in the morning, pro-Russian troops had opened fire on 20 occasions on Ukrainian positions (including on 17 occasions in Donetsk region and on 3 occasions in Luhansk region); the fire was returned on about 10 occasions. The spokesman of the Ministry of Defence reported at noon that one Ukrainian serviceman (born in 1994) was lethally wounded and another two were wounded in the Donbass region on the first day of November. Pro-Russian officials at Donetsk city reported 23 Ukrainian violations of the ceasefire in 12 locations using small arms, heavy machine guns, snipers, automatic grenade launchers, 73 mm antitank recoilless rifles, 120 mm mortars, armoured personnel carriers and armoured fighting vehicles. In the course of the past week, Ukrainian forces broke the ceasefire on 141 occasions, firing nine 122 mm artillery rounds and 99 shells from 82 mm and 120 mm mortars.
- 2 November: The spokesman of the Ukrainian operational headquarters reported in the morning, that pro-Russian troops had opened fire on 22 occasions on Ukrainian positions; the fire was returned on 14 occasions. The spokesman of the Ministry of Defence reported at noon no casualties in the Donbass region on 2 November.
- 3 November: According to the information provided by the spokesman of the Ukrainian operational headquarters in the morning, pro-Russian troops had opened fire on 20 occasions on Ukrainian positions (including on 17 occasions in Donetsk region and on 3 occasions in Luhansk region); the fire was returned on several occasions. The spokesman of the Ministry of Defence confirmed at noon that two Ukrainian soldiers were wounded in the Donbass region on 3 October. Pro-Russian authorities at Donetsk city reported 16 Ukrainian violations of the ceasefire in 12 locations using small arms, heavy machine guns, automatic grenade launchers and 73 mm antitank recoilless rifles. Officials from the self-proclaimed Luhansk People's Republic recorded one Ukrainian violation of the truce within the republic boundaries, when Ukrainian forces from Svitlodarsk shelled Lozove with 73 mm antitank recoilless rifles.
- 19 November: According to the information provided by the spokesman of the Ukrainian operational headquarters in the morning, pro-Russian troops had opened fire on 21 occasions on Ukrainian positions (including on 13 occasions in Donetsk region and on 8 occasions in Luhansk region); the fire was returned on 12 occasions. The spokesman of the Ministry of Defence confirmed at noon that three Ukrainian servicemen were wounded in the Donbass region on 19 November. An Orlan-10 Russian-made drone was shot down by a Ukrainian Air Force defense unit while "collecting intelligence information along the Bakhmut-Kostiantynivka-Ocheretyne route", Ukrainian JFO sources said. The shot down Orlan was one of thirteen reconnaissance flights of the UAVs recorded in a week. The Ministry of Defence reported total 91 ceasefire violations during last week (from 12 to 18 November), as a result, one Ukrainian serviceman was killed and four others were wounded in action.
- 4 December: The spokesman of the Ukrainian operational headquarters reported in the morning, that pro-Russian troops had opened fire on 24 occasions on Ukrainian positions (including on 18 occasions in Donetsk region and on 6 occasions in Luhansk region); the fire was returned on 15 occasions. By morning of 5 December (as of 11:00 am) one ceasefire violation was registered with no casualties on the Ukrainian side. The spokesman of the Ministry of Defence confirmed at noon that one Ukrainian serviceman was killed and another three were wounded in action in the Donbass region on 4 November. In the outskirts of Donetsk city and in the region of Mariupol, 82 mm mortar volleys struck Pisky, Vodiane and Shyrokyne. Pro-Russian armoured fighting vehicles engaged Ukrainian redoubts at Vodiane, while antitank guided missiles hit Krasnohorivka. Small arms and heavy machine guns were fired at Pisky, Shyrokyne, Starohnativka, Vodiane, Novomykhailivka, Berezove, Avdiivka, Slavne and Taramchuk. In the northern sector of the demarcation line, Luhanske received fire from 82 mm and 120 mm mortars, while Krymske and Novozvanivka were hit by 82 mm mortar rounds. Pro-Russian armoured fighting vehicles opened fire on Ukrainian positions at Troitske. Sniper fire was reported at Novozvanivka.
- 5 December: According to the information provided by the spokesman of the Ukrainian operational headquarters in the morning, pro-Russian troops had opened fire on 15 occasions on Ukrainian positions (including on 11 occasions in Donetsk region and on 5 occasions in Luhansk region, all at Vilnyi (ESE part of Zolote, 48°40′59″N 38°33′2″E), where 82 mm mortars were employed on about 60 occasions); the fire was returned on 8 occasions. The spokesman of the Ministry of Defence confirmed at noon that one Ukrainian serviceman was wounded in the Donbass region on 5 December.
- 13 December: According to the information provided by the spokesman of the Ukrainian operational headquarters in the morning, pro-Russian troops had opened fire on 22 occasions on Ukrainian positions (including on 19 occasions in Donetsk region and on 3 occasions in Luhansk region); the fire was returned on several occasions. The spokesman of the Ministry of Defence reported at noon that two Ukrainian servicemen (born in 1973 and in 1996) were killed in the Donbass region on 13 December. In the area of Donetsk city and in the region of Mariupol, Vodiane and Hnutove were shelled with 82 mm and 120 mm mortars. Pro-Russian armoured fighting vehicles attacked Ukrainian positions around Hnutove, while infantry weapons and rocket launchers were fired at Marinka, Krasnohorivka, Lebedinske, Avdiivka, Hnutove, Nevelske, Vodiane and Shyrokyne. Sniper fire was reported at Nevelske and Hnutove. In the northern sector of the demarcation line, 82 mm and 120 mm mortars landed in Khutora Vilnyi. Antitank rockets were fired at Ukrainian redoubts near Krymske. Heavy machine gun fire was reported at Novhorodske.
- 24 December: The spokesman of the Ukrainian operational headquarters reported in the morning, that pro-Russian troops had opened fire on 20 occasions on Ukrainian positions (including on 14 occasions in Donetsk region and on 6 occasions in Luhansk region); the fire was returned on several occasions. The spokesman of the Ministry of Defence confirmed at noon that three Ukrainian servicemen were wounded in action in the Donbass region on 24 December. In the surroundings of Donetsk city and in the region of Mariupol, 120 mm mortar rounds landed in Pisky, while 82 mm mortar fire hit Hnutove and Vodiane. Infantry weapons and grenade launchers were used to harass Ukrainian troops at Pisky, Kamianka, Taramchuk, Vodiane, Hnutove and Chermalyk. In the northern sector of the demarcation line, Krymske was shelled with 82 mm and 120 mm mortars, while 82 mm mortars rounds landed in Kryakivka.
