= Olkhovka =

Olkhovka (Russian: Ольховка) is the name of several rural localities in Russia.

== Modern rural localities ==
=== Republic of Bashkortostan ===
As of 2010, four rural localities in the Republic of Bashkortostan bear this name:

- Olkhovka, Bizhbulyaksky District, Republic of Bashkortostan, a village in Demsky Selsoviet of Bizhbulyaksky District
- Olkhovka, Blagoveshchensky District, Republic of Bashkortostan, a village in Novonadezhdinsky Selsoviet of Blagoveshchensky District
- Olkhovka, Kuyurgazinsky District, Republic of Bashkortostan, a khutor in Otradinsky Selsoviet of Kuyurgazinsky District
- Olkhovka, Tuymazinsky District, Republic of Bashkortostan, a village in Nikolayevsky Selsoviet of Tuymazinsky District

=== Belgorod Oblast ===
As of 2010, one rural locality in Belgorod Oblast bears this name:

- Olkhovka, Belgorod Oblast, a selo in Yakovlevsky District

=== Bryansk Oblast ===
As of 2010, six rural localities in Bryansk Oblast bear this name:

- Olkhovka, Karachevsky District, Bryansk Oblast, a village in Verkhopolsky Selsoviet of Karachevsky District
- Olkhovka, Kurshanovichsky Selsoviet, Klimovsky District, Bryansk Oblast, a settlement in Kurshanovichsky Selsoviet of Klimovsky District
- Olkhovka, Vorobyevsky Selsoviet, Klimovsky District, Bryansk Oblast, a village in Vorobyevsky Selsoviet of Klimovsky District
- Olkhovka, Klintsovsky District, Bryansk Oblast, a selo in Olkhovsky Selsoviet of Klintsovsky District
- Olkhovka, Vygonichsky District, Bryansk Oblast, a village in Ormensky Selsoviet of Vygonichsky District
- Olkhovka, Zhukovsky District, Bryansk Oblast, a village in Zaborsko-Nikolsky Selsoviet of Zhukovsky District

=== Chelyabinsk Oblast ===
As of 2010, one rural locality in Chelyabinsk Oblast bears this name:

- Olkhovka, Chelyabinsk Oblast, a settlement in Velikopetrovsky Selsoviet of Kartalinsky District

=== Ivanovo Oblast ===
As of 2010, one rural locality in Ivanovo Oblast bears this name:

- Olkhovka, Ivanovo Oblast, a village in Ivanovsky District

=== Kaliningrad Oblast ===
As of 2010, one rural locality in Kaliningrad Oblast bears this name:

- Olkhovka, Kaliningrad Oblast, a settlement in Zorinsky Rural Okrug of Gvardeysky District

=== Kaluga Oblast ===
As of 2010, two rural localities in Kaluga Oblast bear this name:

- Olkhovka, Kozelsky District, Kaluga Oblast, a village in Kozelsky District
- Olkhovka, Medynsky District, Kaluga Oblast, a village in Medynsky District

=== Kostroma Oblast ===
As of 2010, one rural locality in Kostroma Oblast bears this name:

- Olkhovka, Kostroma Oblast, a village in Kuzhbalskoye Settlement of Neysky District

=== Krasnoyarsk Krai ===
As of 2010, one rural locality in Krasnoyarsk Krai bears this name:

- Olkhovka, Krasnoyarsk Krai, a selo in Tarutinsky Selsoviet of Achinsky District

=== Kurgan Oblast ===
As of 2010, two rural localities in Kurgan Oblast bear this name:

- Olkhovka, Dalmatovsky District, Kurgan Oblast, a village in Beloyarsky Selsoviet of Dalmatovsky District
- Olkhovka, Shadrinsky District, Kurgan Oblast, a selo in Olkhovsky Selsoviet of Shadrinsky District

=== Kursk Oblast ===
As of 2010, two rural localities in Kursk Oblast bear this name:

- Olkhovka, Khomutovsky District, Kursk Oblast, a selo in Olkhovsky Selsoviet of Khomutovsky District
- Olkhovka, Zheleznogorsky District, Kursk Oblast, a settlement in Troyanovsky Selsoviet of Zheleznogorsky District

=== Leningrad Oblast ===
As of 2010, one rural locality in Leningrad Oblast bears this name:

- Olkhovka, Leningrad Oblast, a village in Petrovskoye Settlement Municipal Formation of Priozersky District

=== Lipetsk Oblast ===
As of 2010, one rural locality in Lipetsk Oblast bears this name:

- Olkhovka, Lipetsk Oblast, a selo in Nizhnematrensky Selsoviet of Dobrinsky District

=== Republic of Mordovia ===
As of 2010, one rural locality in the Republic of Mordovia bears this name:

- Olkhovka, Republic of Mordovia, a settlement in Krasinsky Selsoviet of Dubyonsky District

=== Moscow Oblast ===
As of 2010, one rural locality in Moscow Oblast bears this name:

- Olkhovka, Moscow Oblast, a village in Semenovskoye Rural Settlement of Stupinsky District

=== Nizhny Novgorod Oblast ===
As of 2010, one rural locality in Nizhny Novgorod Oblast bears this name:

- Olkhovka, Nizhny Novgorod Oblast, a village in Bolsheokulovsky Selsoviet of Navashinsky District

=== Novgorod Oblast ===
As of 2010, three rural localities in Novgorod Oblast bear this name:

- Olkhovka, Krestetsky District, Novgorod Oblast, a village in Ustvolmskoye Settlement of Krestetsky District
- Olkhovka, Malovishersky District, Novgorod Oblast, a village in Verebyinskoye Settlement of Malovishersky District
- Olkhovka, Okulovsky District, Novgorod Oblast, a village in Borovenkovskoye Settlement of Okulovsky District

=== Novosibirsk Oblast ===
As of 2010, one rural locality in Novosibirsk Oblast bears this name:

- Olkhovka, Novosibirsk Oblast, a settlement under the administrative jurisdiction of the work settlement of Chistoozyornoye, Chistoozyorny District

=== Omsk Oblast ===
As of 2010, two rural localities in Omsk Oblast bear this name:

- Olkhovka, Cherlaksky District, Omsk Oblast, a village in Tatarsky Rural Okrug of Cherlaksky District
- Olkhovka, Okoneshnikovsky District, Omsk Oblast, a village in Sergeyevsky Rural Okrug of Okoneshnikovsky District

=== Penza Oblast ===
As of 2010, one rural locality in Penza Oblast bears this name:

- Olkhovka, Penza Oblast, a village in Saltykovsky Selsoviet of Zemetchinsky District

=== Perm Krai ===
As of 2010, ten rural localities in Perm Krai bear this name:

- Olkhovka, Chaykovsky, Perm Krai, a selo under the administrative jurisdiction of the town of krai significance of Chaykovsky
- Olkhovka, Dobryanka, Perm Krai, a settlement under the administrative jurisdiction of the town of krai significance of Dobryanka
- Olkhovka, Cherdynsky District, Perm Krai, a settlement in Cherdynsky District
- Olkhovka, Chernushinsky District, Perm Krai, a village in Chernushinsky District
- Olkhovka, Kungursky District, Perm Krai, a village in Kungursky District
- Olkhovka, Nytvensky District, Perm Krai, a village in Nytvensky District
- Olkhovka, Osinsky District, Perm Krai, a village in Osinsky District
- Olkhovka (settlement), Permsky District, Perm Krai, a settlement in Permsky District
- Olkhovka (village), Permsky District, Perm Krai, a village in Permsky District
- Olkhovka, Sivinsky District, Perm Krai, a village in Sivinsky District

=== Primorsky Krai ===
As of 2010, one rural locality in Primorsky Krai bears this name:

- Olkhovka, Primorsky Krai, a selo in Kirovsky District

=== Ryazan Oblast ===
As of 2010, two rural localities in Ryazan Oblast bear this name:

- Olkhovka, Chuchkovsky District, Ryazan Oblast, a village in Pertovsky Rural Okrug of Chuchkovsky District
- Olkhovka, Alexandro-Nevsky District, Ryazan Oblast, a village in Blagovsky Rural Okrug of Alexandro-Nevsky District

=== Sakhalin Oblast ===
As of 2010, one rural locality in Sakhalin Oblast bears this name:

- Olkhovka, Sakhalin Oblast, a selo in Uglegorsky District

=== Saratov Oblast ===
As of 2010, two rural localities in Saratov Oblast bear this name:

- Olkhovka, Romanovsky District, Saratov Oblast, a selo in Romanovsky District
- Olkhovka, Rtishchevsky District, Saratov Oblast, a village in Rtishchevsky District

=== Smolensk Oblast ===
As of 2010, one rural locality in Smolensk Oblast bears this name:

- Olkhovka, Smolensk Oblast, a village in Volkovskoye Rural Settlement of Krasninsky District

=== Sverdlovsk Oblast ===
As of 2010, four rural localities in Sverdlovsk Oblast bear this name:

- Olkhovka, Verkhnyaya Pyshma, Sverdlovsk Oblast, a settlement under the administrative jurisdiction of the Town of Verkhnyaya Pyshma
- Olkhovka, Irbitsky District, Sverdlovsk Oblast, a village in Irbitsky District
- Olkhovka, Kamyshlovsky District, Sverdlovsk Oblast, a settlement in Kamyshlovsky District
- Olkhovka, Sysertsky District, Sverdlovsk Oblast, a village in Sysertsky District

=== Tambov Oblast ===
As of 2010, one rural locality in Tambov Oblast bears this name:

- Olkhovka, Tambov Oblast, a selo in Parevsky Selsoviet of Inzhavinsky District

=== Tver Oblast ===
As of 2010, three rural localities in Tver Oblast bear this name:

- Olkhovka, Maksatikhinsky District, Tver Oblast, a village in Maksatikhinsky District
- Olkhovka, Spirovsky District, Tver Oblast, a settlement in Spirovsky District
- Olkhovka, Toropetsky District, Tver Oblast, a village in Toropetsky District

=== Udmurt Republic ===
As of 2010, one rural locality in the Udmurt Republic bears this name:

- Olkhovka, Udmurt Republic, a village in Uva-Tuklinsky Selsoviet of Uvinsky District

=== Ulyanovsk Oblast ===
As of 2010, one rural locality in Ulyanovsk Oblast bears this name:

- Olkhovka, Ulyanovsk Oblast, a selo in Khmelevsky Rural Okrug of Sursky District

=== Volgograd Oblast ===
As of 2010, one rural locality in Volgograd Oblast bears this name:

- Olkhovka, Volgograd Oblast, a selo in Olkhovsky Selsoviet of Olkhovsky District

=== Vologda Oblast ===
As of 2010, one rural locality in Vologda Oblast bears this name:

- Olkhovka, Vologda Oblast, a village in Ust-Alexeyevsky Selsoviet of Velikoustyugsky District

=== Yaroslavl Oblast ===
As of 2010, one rural locality in Yaroslavl Oblast bears this name:

- Olkhovka, Yaroslavl Oblast, a village in Dmitriyevsky Rural Okrug of Danilovsky District

== Abolished rural localities ==
- Olkhovka, Tyumen Oblast, a settlement in Zavodoukovsky District of Tyumen Oblast; abolished in November 2008
