= Shyrokyne standoff =

2015 battle in the Donbas war in Ukraine

Coordinates: 47.1112°N 37.6780°E

- Part of War in Donbas
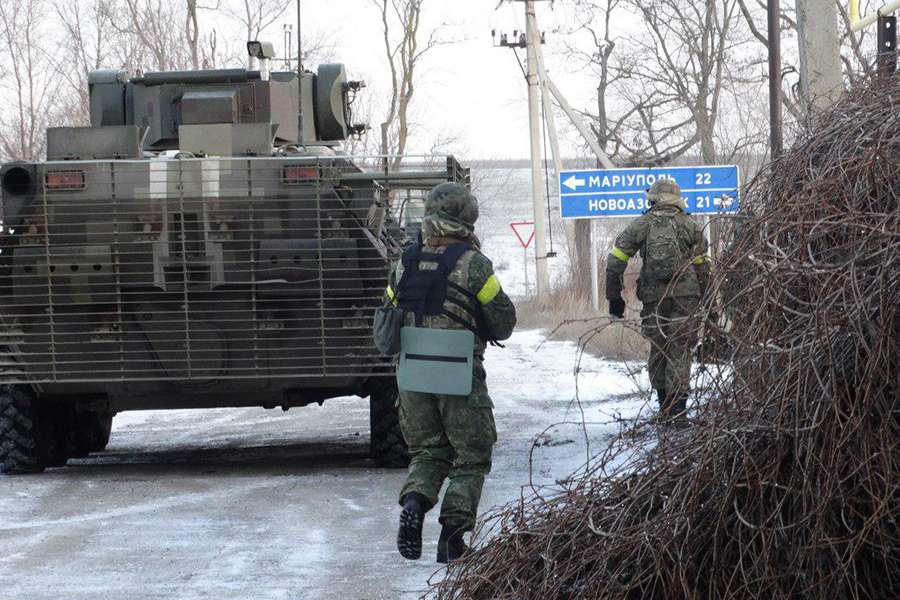
- Azov Regiment soldiers and armored vehicle in Shyrokyne.
Date	10 February – 3 July 2015 (4 months, 3 weeks and 2 days)
Location	Shyrokyne area, Donetsk Oblast, Ukraine
Result	Ukrainian victory
Territorial changes	Ukrainian forces capture Shyrokyne, Pavlopil, Kominternovo and Oktyabyr; Separatists recapture Pavlopil, Pyshchevyk, Vodyane, Kominternovo, Oktyabyr and much of Shyrokyne; Ukrainian forces once again capture Pavlopil, Pyshchevyk and Vodyane; Separatists withdraw from Shyrokyne, which is destroyed by the fighting, and it becomes a demilitarized zone

Belligerents
Donetsk People's Republic	Ukraine

Commanders and leaders
Alexander Zakharchenko	(Ukraine) Andriy Biletsky

Units involved
United Armed Forces of Novorossiya; Republican Guard of the Donetsk PR; Oplot Battalion; Sparta Battalion	Armed Forces of Ukraine; Ukrainian Ground Forces; Separate Presidential Brigade; 37th "Zaporizhzhia" Territorial Defense Battalion; Ukrainian Air Assault Forces; 79th Air Assault Brigade; 3rd "Feniks" Air Assault Battalion; 80th Air Assault Brigade; National Guard of Ukraine; Azov Regiment; Donbas Battalion; Special Tasks Patrol Police; Eastern Corps; "Berda" Company; Right Sector; Ukrainian Volunteer Corps; Sheikh Mansur Battalion

Casualties and losses
110 killed or wounded (Russian claim); 800+ killed, wounded and captured (Azov claim)	60–70 killed 200–250 wounded

The Shyrokyne standoff was a battle for the control of the strategic village of Shyrokyne, located approximately 11 km (6.8 mi) east of Mariupol city limits, between Ukrainian forces led by the Azov Regiment, and Russian-backed separatists, between February and July 2015. It was part of the larger war in Donbas. On 10 February 2015, the Azov Regiment launched a surprise offensive against pro-Russian separatists associated with the Donetsk People's Republic (DPR) with the aim of pushing the separatist forces away from Mariupol city limits. The village is located just 10 km (6.2 mi) from the Ukrainian-controlled city of Mariupol, and was used as a launching point for separatist attacks on the city, which served as the administrative centre of Donetsk Oblast whilst DPR forces control Donetsk city. Fighting continued until 3 July 2015, when DPR forces unilaterally withdrew from Shyrokyne. Subsequently, a cease-fire was declared in the area.

== Background ==
Mariupol had come under attack several times over the course of the war in Donbas, including in May–June 2014, when pro-Russian forces controlled the city, and in September 2014, when separatist forces tried to recapture the city prior to the signing of the Minsk Protocol. A separatist rocket attack, launched from the area around Shyrokyne on 24 January 2015, killed thirty civilians in Ukrainian-controlled Mariupol proper. Following this attack, Ukrainian forces, led by the Azov Regiment, began an offensive to stop the separatists from launching similar attacks.

== Events ==
=== Ukrainian offensive ===
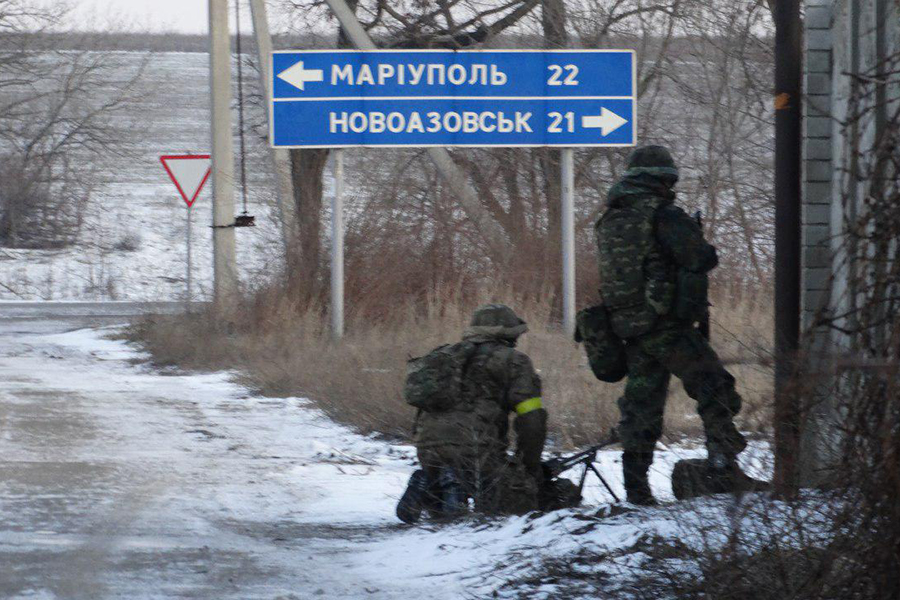
Ukrainian soldiers at the offensive against Shyrokyne.

Following the 24 January rocket attack, it became clear that Mariupol was vulnerable to further separatist attacks. Ukrainian forces said on 7 February that the DPR was massing forces for an attack on Mariupol. In response to these threats to the security of Mariupol, the National Guard of Ukraine, the Azov Regiment, and other Ukrainian volunteer groups launched an offensive to the east of the city, along the coast of the Azov Sea, toward Novoazovsk, on 10 February. The Ukrainian government said that the offensive was intended to eliminate insurgent positions near Mariupol, so as to stop shelling, and to regain positions demarcated as Ukrainian under the Minsk Protocol. Azov Regiment members, on the other hand, said that the goal of the offensive was to retake Novoazovsk, which had been under DPR control since a battle there in August 2014.

The new Ukrainian offensive outside Mariupol came as DPR and LPR forces were assaulting the strategic town of Debaltseve, 200 kilometres (120 mi) to the north. Accordingly, the offensive was also intended to relieve pressure on Debaltseve by forcing the insurgents divert manpower and weaponry to the southern part of the line of contact. After breaking through DPR lines, the Azov Regiment managed to quickly capture the towns of Shyrokyne, Pavlopil, and Kominternove, and began to advance toward Novoazovsk. According to the battalion, Ukrainian flags were raised in Shyrokyne, Pavlopil and Oktyabr. Ukrainian forces pushed the separatists back to Sakhanka, about 7 km (4.3 mi) north-east of Shyrokyne, where DPR forces held the line. Ukrainian and DPR forces continued to fight at Sakhanka on 11 February, as Ukrainian forces led by the Azov Regiment attempted to secure the village. According to Ukrainian president Petro Poroshenko, the advance by Ukrainian forces into Sakhanka "moved the frontline to correspond exactly to the Minsk memorandum as a result of the counter-offensive".

Shyrokyne was heavily bombarded by DPR artillery on 12 February. According to the Azov Regiment, the separatists had launched an all-out counter-offensive to curtail the Ukrainian advance, deploying tanks and artillery. Ukrainian forces suffered heavy losses amidst the bombardment, and the battalion said that "Shyrokyne has been virtually wiped out" by the artillery fire. Subsequently, the Azov Regiment was forced to retreat from Sakhanka to Shyrokyne, leaving it under DPR control. Due to the fighting in the area around Shyrokyne, local emergency authorities evacuated all civilians from the Ukrainian government-controlled parts of Novoazovsk Raion to Mariupol.

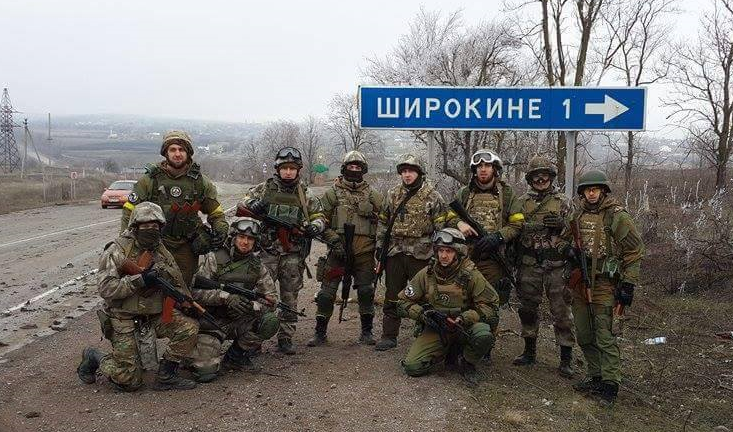
Special Tasks Patrol Police "Eastern Corps" volunteers in Shyrokyne.

=== Minsk II ===
A new ceasefire agreement, called Minsk II, was signed on 12 February. According to the agreement, a total ceasefire across the Donbas was to begin at midnight on 15 February. Despite this, five Ukrainian soldiers were killed and twenty-two were wounded in a DPR attack at Shyrokyne on 16 February. By the 21st of February, the Ukrainian government said that separatist forces were once again massing for a new offensive on Mariupol. NSDC spokesman Andriy Lysenko said that DPR forces were "conducting sabotage and intelligence operations round the clock to test government defences" in the area around Shyrokyne. DPR forces in Sakhanka had dug in, whilst those in and Bezimenne had established a base of operations in some houses there. Ukrainian officials said that Russia had sent tanks and soldiers toward Novoazovsk to reinforce the DPR, and a Reuters team said it saw men who "looked like Russian military special forces wearing Russian army patches and insignia on their uniforms" at Bezimenne.

DPR forces recaptured the villages of Pavlopil and Pyshchevyk on 25 February. According to a Ukrainian official, these villages were in the buffer zone established by Minsk II, and hence had not been occupied by Ukrainian forces. Sporadic fighting continued in the Shyrokyne area, and The Guardian reported exchanges of artillery and machine gun fire. A local commander of the Donbas Battalion said that his forces had engaged the separatists, destroying an anti-aircraft gun and a petrol tanker. In addition, Ukrainian soldiers began to build a second defensive line in the adjacent village of Berdyanske, which lies just to the west of Shyrokyne. Continued concerns about a potential separatist offensive on Mariupol were bolstered by a report on 27 February that said that DPR heavy weaponry had been seen leaving Donetsk in the direction of Mariupol. Sporadic exchanges of fire continued over the next few days. The next major outbreak of fighting occurred on 9 March, when Ukrainian forces said that the DPR had launched a hail of tank and mortar fire onto Ukrainian positions in Shyrokyne. They said that the DPR was attempting to "force Ukrainian contingents from Shyrokyne". Whilst Ukrainian troops continued to hold the line, DPR forces managed to gain control of about 30 percent of the village by 21 March. By the end of the month, between 50 and 60 percent of Shyrokyne had been destroyed in the fighting.

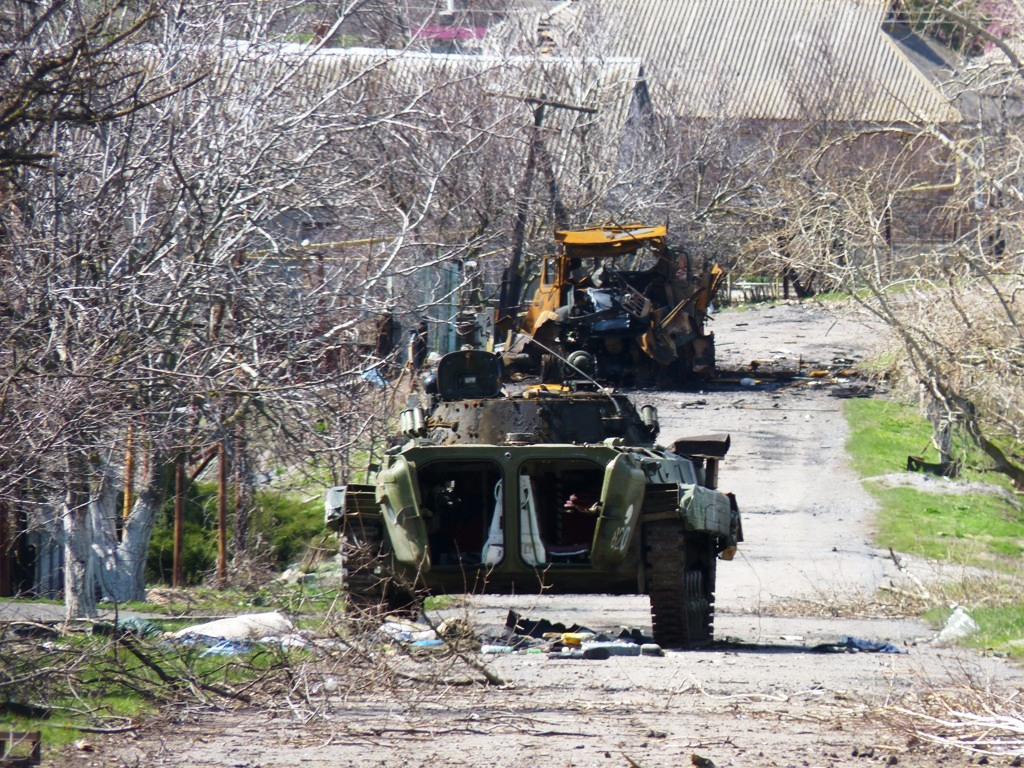
Destroyed armored vehicles near Shyrokyne.

On 5 April, a landmine exploded under a military vehicle at Shyrokyne killing two soldiers and injuring a third, a military spokesman said on the TV channel 112.

On 13 April, it was confirmed the separatists had captured the village of Vodyane, seven kilometers east of Mariupol, after it was in the middle of a no man's land for almost a month following a retreat by government troops. The next day, a Russian journalist was injured by a landmine in Skyrokyne during a tour as some of the heaviest fighting since February erupted. By 16 April, separatists were in control of much of Shyrokyne.

On 18 April, a Georgian member of the Azov Regiment was killed in fighting near Shyrokyne.

In late April, Deutsche Welle reported that pro-Russian militants had set up positions in the centre of Shyrokyne and that the OSCE and Red Cross were not always granted access. On 26 April, the OSCE observed what it assessed to be the most intense shelling in Shyrokyne since February. It also reported Pavlopil and Pyshchevyk to be once again government-held.

On 5 May, 12 hours of sustained separatist attacks in Shyrokyne against Ukrainian positions near the beach took place, after a one-hour tank assault was launched, followed by constant firefights.

In mid-June, as Ukrainian president Poroshenko visited government lines at Mariupol, more fighting near Shyrokyne left one soldier dead and two wounded.

=== Separatist withdrawal ===
On 1 July, separatist forces proclaimed Shyrokyne to be a demilitarized zone and withdrew from the village. Denis Pushilin, the self-declared Chairman of the Supreme Soviet of Donetsk People's Republic, stated that the decision to withdraw forces from Shyrokyne was made "as an act of good will and the demonstration of peaceful intentions." On 3 July, the Ukrainian government confirmed the separatists had withdrawn from the village. According to Andriy Biletsky, commander of Ukraine's Azov Regiment which launched the offensive to seize the village in February 2015, the DNR's decision to leave was not due to their willingness to follow the Minsk agreement but due to the heavy casualties suffered by the separatists while battling to hold the village. OSCE observers confirmed areas of the village previously held by the "DNR" had been vacated, stating they "observed no armed formation in the village, except for some Ukrainian Armed Forces positions at the village's south-western edge."

As of 7 July, neither side controlled Shyrokyne as the Azov Regiment was holding positions on a nearby hill, while the separatists pulled back to another hill outside the village. Ukrainian fighters of the Right Sector Ukrainian Volunteer Corps group said that they would ignore any order to withdraw from the village, despite calls for it to become a demilitarised zone. A local Right Sector commander said that a withdrawal from Shyrokyne would expose Mariupol to attack, and that "only enemies of Ukraine can give an order to withdraw".

== Aftermath, demilitarization ==
On 29 July, the volunteer battalions Azov and Donbas left their positions at the village and were replaced with a unit of active duty marines. The decision to pull out the Donbas battalion from Shyrokyne was met with protests from residents of Mariupol, who feared that the withdrawal would lead to Russian separatists quickly retaking the village and once again begin shelling the city.

In early August, Ukrainian, Russian and OSCE representatives started forming a blueprint on the demilitarization of Shyrokyne. This was reportedly met with opposition from Mariupol residents and volunteer fighters, but the Ukrainian president stated that Ukrainian troops would remain on the heights outside the town. More skirmishes took place mid-August at Starohnativka, north of Mariupol, when two Ukrainian Marines were killed. Later that month, as negotiations were still being conducted for the demilitarization of the town, the Ukrainian Chief of General Staff commented that Shyrokyne had 'no military value'. This sparked outrage among some Ukrainian activists and volunteer soldiers. As of mid-September, Shyrokyne had become a demilitarized zone and Ukrainian forces were preventing civilians from returning to their homes due to a large number of explosive devices remaining in the area. Ukrainian military and separatist positions continued to be 300 m (980 ft) apart.

On 25 February 2016, the Ukrainian military claimed that the separatists abandoned all of their positions around Shyrokyne, allowing them to take control of the town. According to the military, the retreating separatists extensively mined and booby trapped the area, with Ukrainian bomb squads still neutralizing these threats as of March 2016. Earlier, the OSCE stated that it was impossible for civilians to live in Shyrokyne.

== See also ==
- Outline of the Russo-Ukrainian War
