= East Company (Ukraine) =

- Ukrainian: Компанія Схід
- Active: 2014–present
- Country: Ukraine
- Branch: Ministry of Internal Affairs
- Type: Special Tasks Patrol Police
- Role: Elite Force for Special Operations
- Size: 100
- Garrison/HQ: Kharkiv
- Nicknames: Scythians; Orientals; Black hundred of Kharkiv
- Mottos: "It is better to be than to give up!" "Slaves are not allowed to heaven!"
- Engagements: Russo-Ukrainian War; Anti-drug operations; 2014 pro-Russian unrest in Ukraine; 2014 Kharkiv unrest; War in Donbass; Shyrokyne standoff; 2022 Russian invasion of Ukraine; Eastern Ukraine campaign; Battle of Kharkiv; 2022 Kharkiv counteroffensive; Battle of Bakhmut

Commanders
- Current commander: Serhii Bohdanovskyi
- Notable commanders: Oleg Viktorovych Shiryaev

Insignia
- Former Insignia

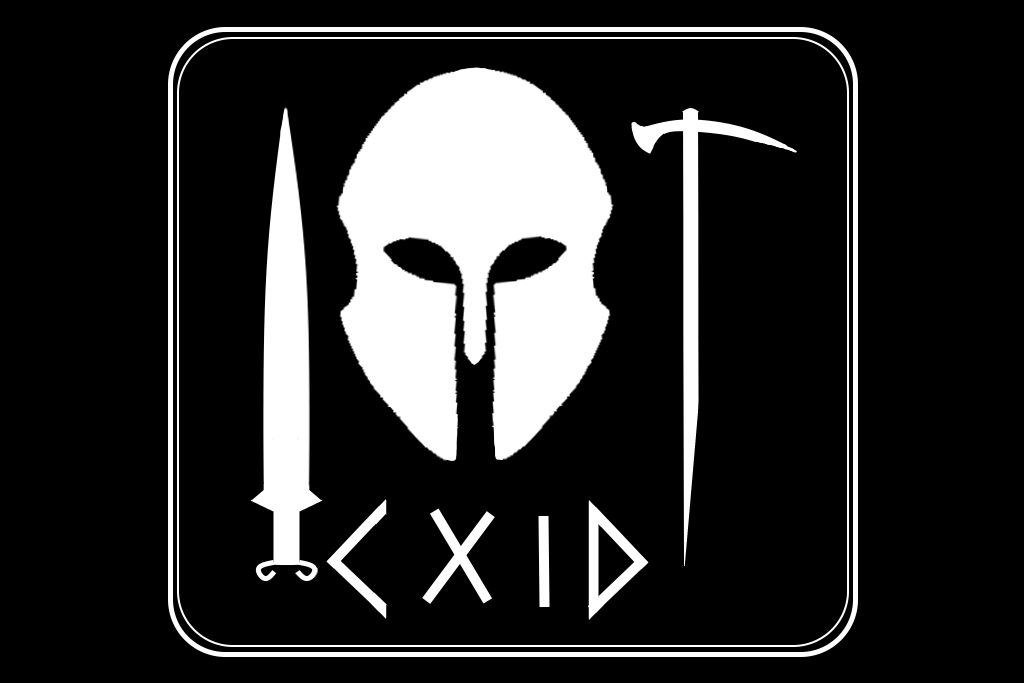
- Flag

The East Company, also known as Skhid Company or Scythian Company and formerly known as the Eastern Corps Company, is an elite "rapid response" unit of the Special Police Forces and is subordinated to the Ministry of Internal Affairs of Ukraine. It is tasked with a variety of special operations and is also tasked with repelling separatist attempts in Kharkiv Oblast. It was established in 2014 in the city of Kharkiv. Its military wing has seen heavy combat throughout the War in Donbas and the Russian invasion of Ukraine. It also has a public wing which performs a variety of tasks.

== History ==
It was established in February–March 2014 as the public movement "Eastern Corps" in response to the 2014 pro-Russian unrest in Ukraine following the Euromaidan, founded by Oleg Shiryaev, Igor Martynenko and Anatoliy Sydorenko to oppose separatism in Kharkiv Oblast, and drawing force mainly from "Patriot of Ukraine" and FC Metalist Kharkiv fans. They participated in the fight against drugs in Kharkiv and on 10 August 2014, its personnel conducted a raid on a drug sales point in Kharkiv, seizing narcotic substances and destroying them. On 6 October 2014, members of the "Eastern Corps" found a BTR-80 with an installed machine gun at the communal road maintenance enterprise No. 6 of Kharkiv with a large number of separatist symbols, and according to the commander of the "Eastern Corps" Oleg Shiryaev, on the second floor of the enterprise they found a separatist armed installation, which was promptly seized. In November 2014, it became an official company of the Special Tasks Patrol Police by the order of Arsen Avakov. In January 2015, the soldiers of the company left for the ATO zone. On 10 February 2015, the company took part in the Shyrokyne standoff engaging in direct combat with DPR separatists and captured a separatist artillery coordinator. Several soldiers of the company were wounded in the standoff. At the same time, some of the company's personnel continued to perform the functions of protecting public order and administrative buildings in Kharkiv. On 27 April 2015, another 30 new soldiers joined the company including both male and female personnel. On 30 June 2015 the "Eastern Corps" company again went to ATO zone and held positions on the line of contact with the enemy near Hranitne, repulsing multiple attacks of separatist sabotage and reconnaissance groups who attacked the company's positions using small arms, automatic grenade launchers and mortars as well as 120 mm artillery. As of the beginning of September 2015, the company's personnel numbered more than 100. The "Eastern Corps" company became the Rapid response company "East" in May 2018 under the command of Serhii Tamarin. Throughout 2018 and 2019, it saw deployment in the ATO zone, firstly in Komyshuvakha and Vrubivka during May–June 2018 and from them on in Mariupol.

Following the Russian invasion of Ukraine, it saw combat operations in Kharkiv Oblast. On 27 February 2022, they defended the police building in Kharkiv during the Battle of Kharkiv. It also operated its own medevac service and evacuated wounded and disabled from the combat zone of Kharkiv Oblast. Three soldiers of the company (Maksym Serhiyevich Volyk, Oleksandr Klushin and Tarusin Bohdan) were killed in combat on 2 March 2022. On 16 March 2023, during the 2022 Kharkiv counteroffensive, they attacked Russian forces in Mala Rohan. On 17 March 2022, they destroyed MTLBs and ATGM positions were destroyed and a large number of Russians were killed. Another soldier of the company (Dmytro Kupriyanov) was killed in action on 18 March 2022. Following the liberation of Mala Rohan and Vilkhivka, the company saw further engagements during the Eastern Ukraine campaign.

== Public activities ==
At the beginning of autumn 2014, several hundred people were members of the organization, including reserve personnel, professional soldiers and hand-to-hand combat instructors and a training base for Ukrainian partisan units was created by "Eastern Corps" in case of Russian "aggression" in Kharkiv Oblast.

On 23 August 2014 members of the "Eastern Corps" erected a monument for Ivan Sirko near the Mirror Stream.

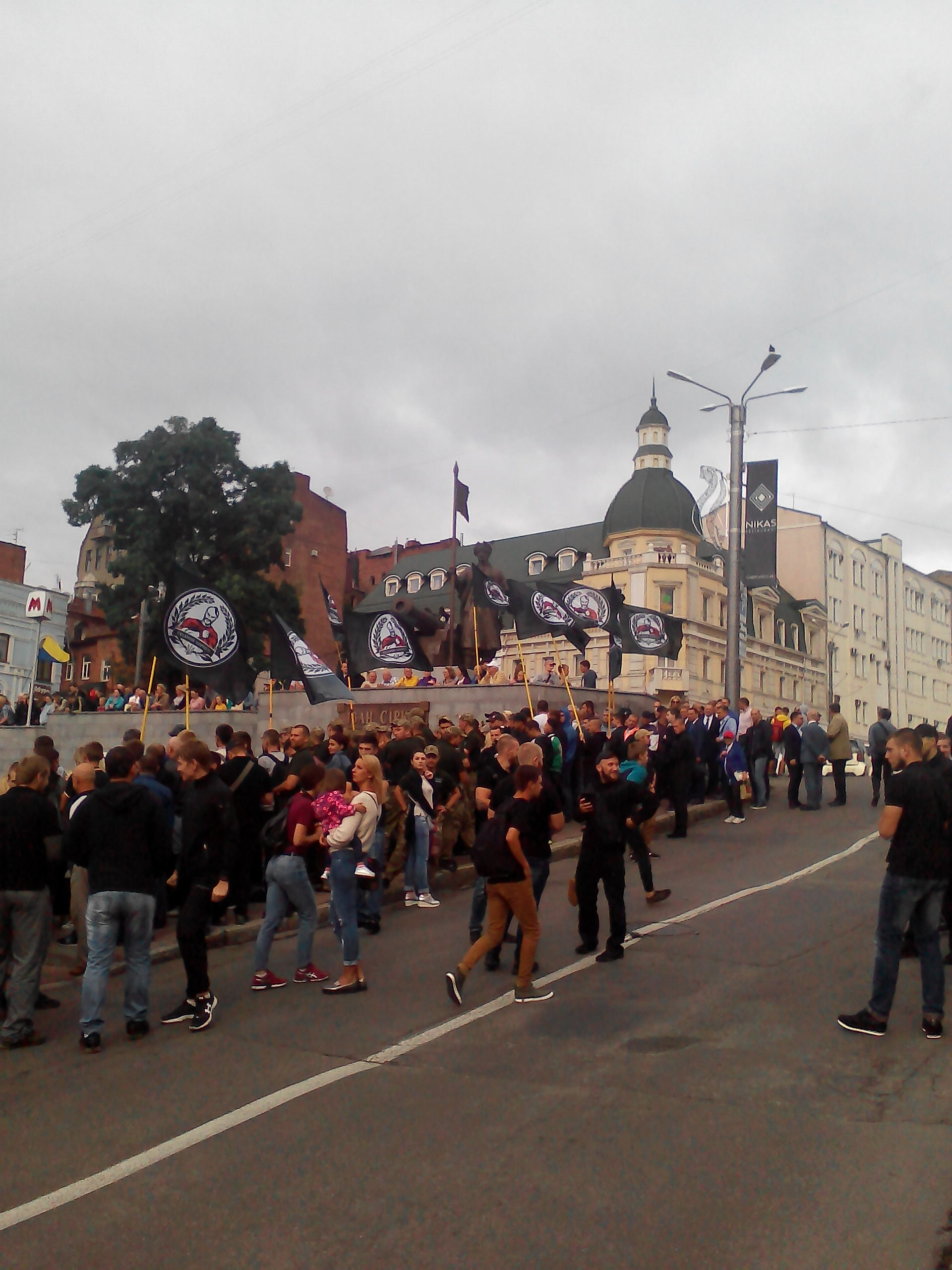
Ivan Sirko monument erected by "Eastern Corps"

Various sports events were held in Kharkiv under the auspices of the "Eastern Corps" . On 20 December 2014, the "Eastern Corps" knife fight cup took place which gathered around 100 participants. Tactics and hand-to-hand combat training for civilian self-defense was also held.

The "Eastern Corps" repeatedly visited orphanages, where they handed over aid collected by the organization and volunteers.

It also trained Kharkiv residents in the operation of small arms, machine guns, and hand-held anti-tank grenade launchers. On 28 June 2015, the "Eastern Corps" held the "Strong Nation" competition which included obstacle course, knife fight, and hand-to-hand combat. "Eastern Corps" also provided combat training to women.

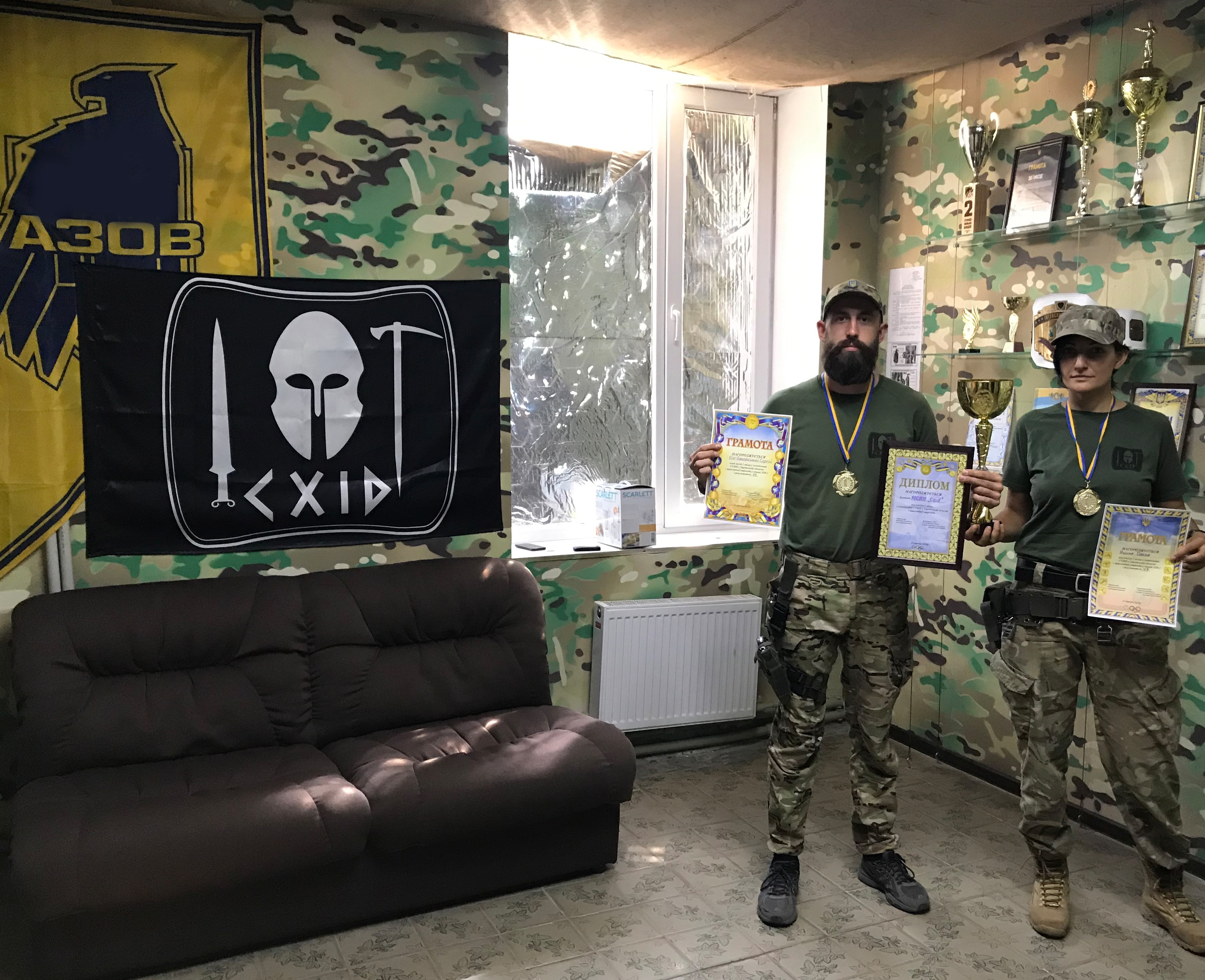
Soldiers of the Company who won the 2019 applied shooting competition

It won the championship of applied shooting of the Main Directorate of the National Police in 2018 and 2019 as well as the cross-country athletics championship of the Main Directorate of the National Police in 2019.

== Equipment ==
Type	Image	Origin	Class	Notes
Small Arms
AKM		Soviet Union	Assault Rifle	
AK-74		Soviet Union	Assault Rifle	
AKS-74U		Soviet Union	Carbine	
IMI Galatz		Israel	Sniper rifle	Produced in Ukraine under the license as Fort-301
IWI Tavor		Israel	Assault Rifle	Produced in Ukraine under the license as Fort-221
Fort-224		Ukraine	Submachine gun	
Fort-14		Ukraine	Pistol	
PM		Soviet Union	Pistol	
APS		Soviet Union	Pistol	
Heavy weaponry
RPK-74		Soviet Union	Machine gun	
PKM		Soviet Union	Machine gun	
DShK		Soviet Union	Machine gun	
RPG-7		Soviet Union	Rocket launcher	
AGS-17		Soviet Union	Automatic grenade launcher	
Vehicles
BTR-80		Soviet Union	APC	Captured from separatists in Kharkiv in 2014.
BTR-60		Soviet Union	APC	Donated by Azov Brigade.
Hyundai Galloper		South Korea	SUV	12 vehicles donated by volunteers.
Mitsubishi L200		Japan	Pickup truck	
VW Transporter		Germany	LCV	

== Symbolics ==
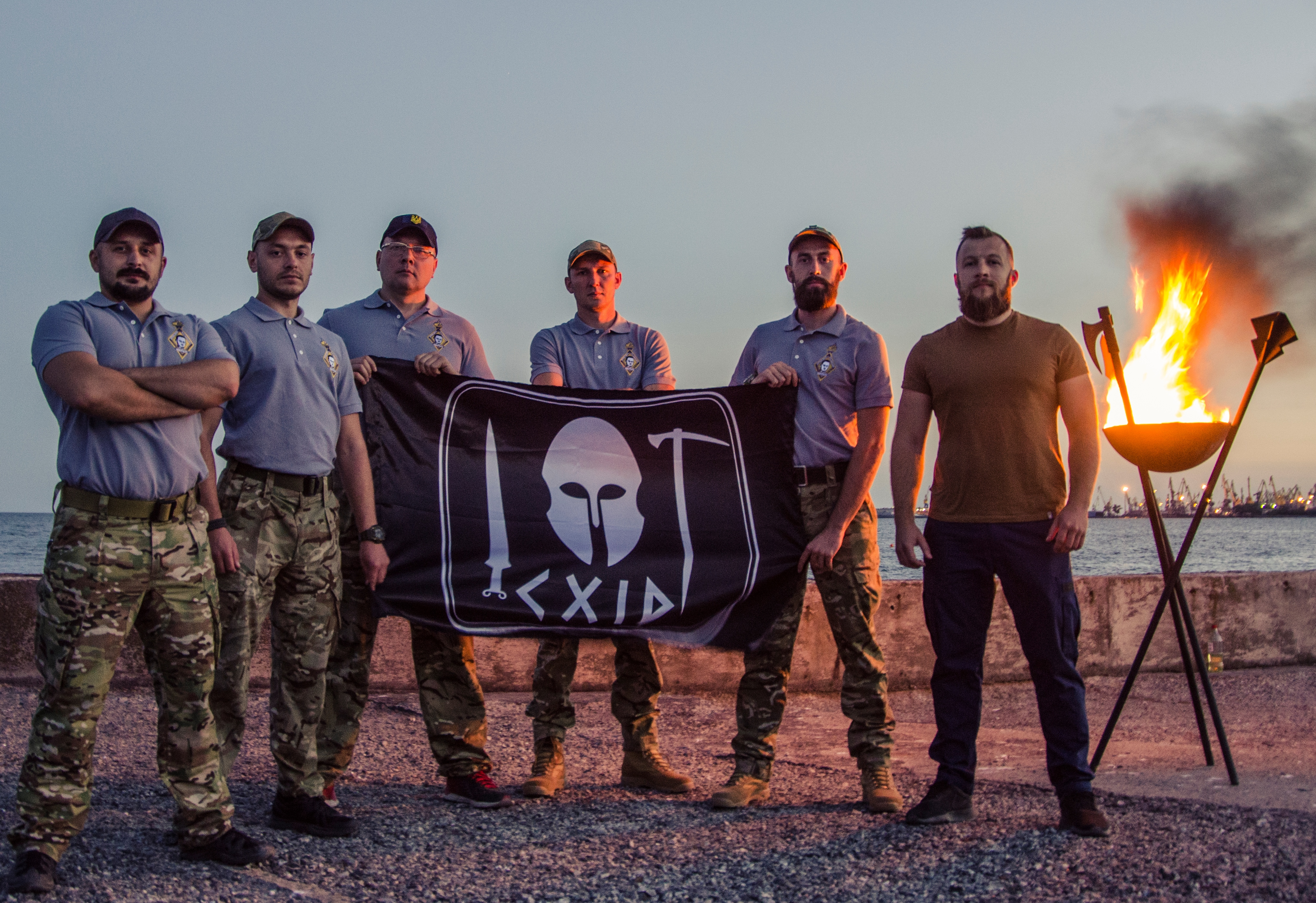
Scythian theme of the Company

Arsen Avakov, in 2015 gave the company a nickname of "Black Hundred in Kharkiv". The "East" company has an exclusively Scythian theme. Its current insignia, on addition to the ancient Scythian helmet also shows a traditional Scythian weapon pair, Acinaces and Sagaris. This eastern approach is also reflected in the fact that the personnel of the company are referred to as "Orientals".

== Commanders ==
- Oleg Viktorovych Shiryaev (2014–2015)
- Anatoly Oleksandrovich Sidorenko (2015)
- Ihor Volodymyrovych Martynenko (2015–2017)
- Serhiy Tamarin (2017–2019)
- Dmytro Balabanov (2019–2020)
- Serhiy Bohdanovskyi (2020-)
