= Prymorske =

Prymorske (Ukrainian: Приморське, meaning "seaside") may refer to several places in Ukraine:

== Donetsk Oblast ==
- Prymorske, former village that merged with Mariupol
- Prymorske, village in Novoazovsk Raion
- Prymorske, former name of Urzuf, village in Manhush Raion

== Kharkiv Oblast ==
- Prymorske, village in Pechenihy Raion

== Kherson Oblast ==
- Prymorske, village in Henichesk Raion
- Prymorske, village in Kalanchak Raion

== Odesa Oblast ==
- Prymorske, village in Bilhorod-Dnistrovskyi Raion
- Prymorske, village in Kiliya Raion
- Prymorske, village in Tatarbunary Raion

== Zaporizhzhia Oblast ==
- Prymorske, village in Vasylivka Raion

== See also ==
- Primorsky (disambiguation)
- Prymorsk, city in Zaporizhzhia Oblast, Ukraine
