= Siedove =

Urban locality in Donetsk Oblast, Ukraine

Siedove Сєдове
- Rural settlement
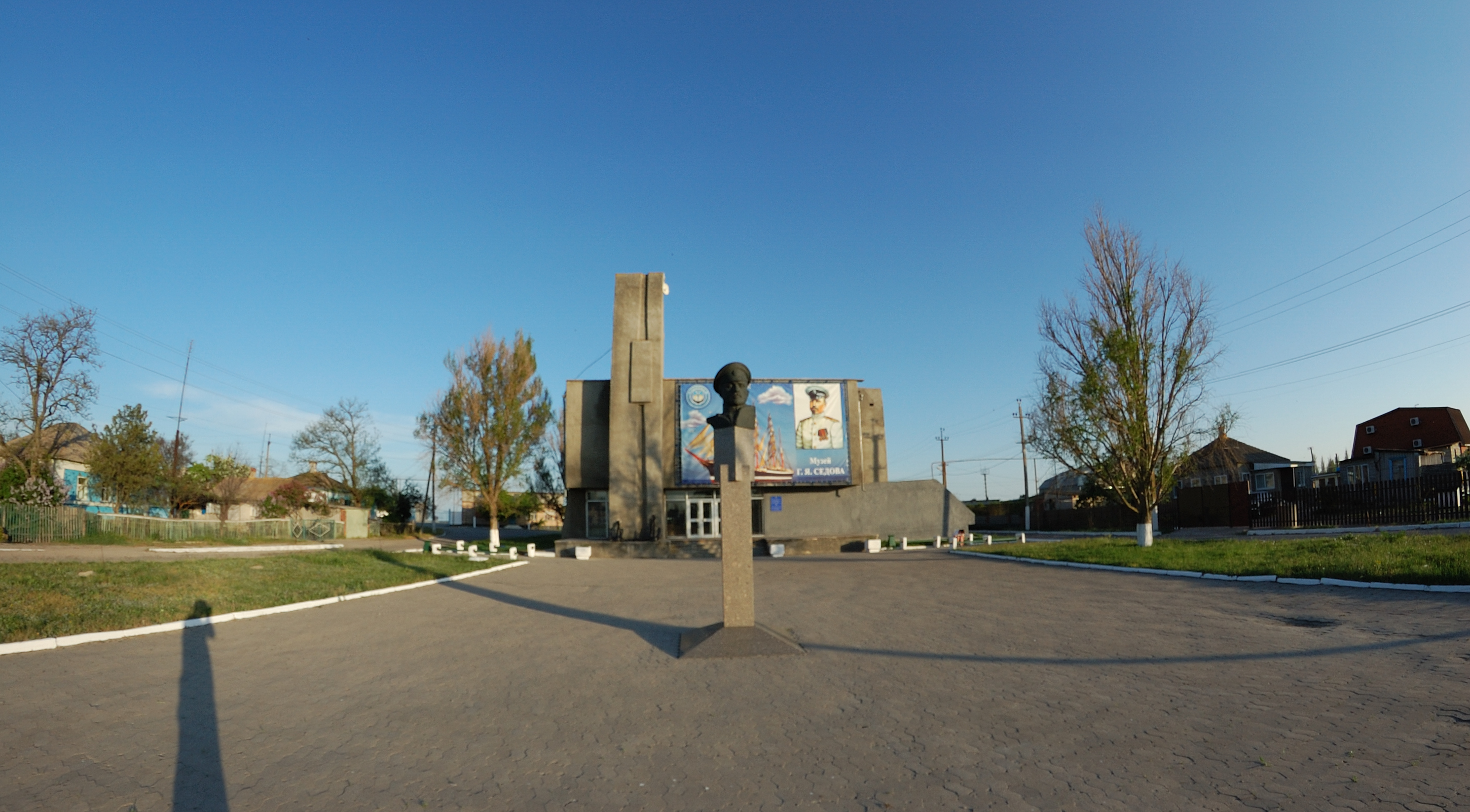

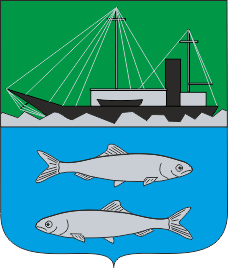
- Coat of arms
- Interactive map of Siedove
- Location within Ukraine Location within Donetsk Oblast
- Coordinates: 47°04′25″N 38°09′37″E
- Country: Ukraine
- Oblast: Donetsk Oblast
- Raion: Kalmiuske Raion
- Hromada: Novoazovsk urban hromada
- Elevation: 0 m (0 ft)

Population (2022)
  - Total: 2,569

Siedove (Ukrainian: Сєдове; Russian: Седово) is a rural settlement in Kalmiuske Raion, Donetsk Oblast, eastern Ukraine. It was formerly part of Novoazovsk Raion. Siedove is located about 7 kilometres (4.3 mi) away from Novoazovsk. It is currently controlled by the Donetsk People's Republic. Population: 2,569 (2022 estimate).

The settlement is named after Georgy Yakovlevich Sedov (1877–1914), a Russian Arctic explorer.

== Geography ==
Located on the Kryva Spit on the coast of the Azov Sea, the small city is 60 km east of Mariupol.

== History ==
The village was founded in 1750. Until 1940 it was called Kryva Kosa (the same name as the spit on which it lies). Then the village was renamed "Siedove" in honor of the famous polar explorer and hydrographer Georgy Sedov, born there in 1877.
