= Primorsk =

Primorsk may refer to:

- Primorsk, Leningrad Oblast, a town in Leningrad Oblast, Russia, formerly Koivisto or Björkö
- Primorsk, Kaliningrad Oblast, an urban-type settlement in Kaliningrad Oblast, Russia, formerly Fischhausen
- Primorsk, Krasnoyarsk Krai, a rural-type settlement in Krasnoyarsk Krai, Russia
- Primorsk, Volgograd Oblast, an urban-type settlement in Volgograd Oblast, Russia
- The Russian-language name of Prymorsk, a town in Zaporizhzhia Oblast, Ukraine
- The former name of Dənizkənarı, Azerbaijan

== See also ==
- Primorsky (disambiguation)
- Primorye (inhabited locality)
