= Sakhanka and Leninske killings =

2021 mass murder in Donetsk

- Location: Sakhanka and Leninske, Novoazovsk Raion, Donetsk Oblast
- Date: August 12, 2021
- Attack type: Mass shooting, grenade attack
- Weapons: AK-74, hand grenade
- Deaths: 8 (including the perpetrator)
- Perpetrator: Danil Tsupryk

The Sakhanka and Leninske killings was a mass murder committed by 19-year-old Danil Tsupryk in Sakhanka and Leninske, Novoazovsk Raion, Donetsk Oblast on August 12, 2021.

== Killings ==
On the evening of August 12, 2021 in Sakhanka, a group of militants of Russian separatist forces in Donbas drank alcohol. After that, Corporal Danil Tsupryk started behaving inappropriately and started shooting at others. There he shot three civilians. They were his girlfriend and an elderly woman and man. He then fled, taking with him an AK-74 assault rifle, four magazines and a hand grenade. He was in camouflage and had a bulletproof vest. A search began for him. On the night of August 12–13, he was surrounded in a two-story building in Leninske by the Donetsk People's Republic (DPR) interior ministry's special response unit. During the assault, he threw a grenade and killed the detachment commander and three soldiers. He was then shot.

== Perpetrator ==
Danil Nikolaevich Tsuprik (Russian: Данил Николаевич Цуприк) was born on February 23, 2002. He served in the 9th Separate Motorized Rifle Regiment of the 1st Army Corps of the DPR. After the killings, the command issued an order to retroactively release him from the army effective August 9, few days before the killings.
