= Verkhnoshyrokivske =

Verkhnoshyrokivske Верхньошироківське
- Village
- Location of Verkhnoshyrokivske within Ukraine
- Coordinates: 47.235278°N 37.861667°E
- Country: Ukraine
- Oblast: Donetsk Oblast
- Raion: Kalmiuske Raion
- Hromada: Novoazovsk urban hromada
- Elevation: 87 m (285 ft)

Population (2001 census)
  - Total: 262
- Time zone: UTC+2 (EET)
  - Summer (DST): UTC+3 (EEST)
- Postal code: 87612
- Area code: +380 6296

Verkhnoshyrokivske (Ukrainian: Верхньошироківське), formerly Oktiabr (Ukrainian: Октябр), is a village in Kalmiuske Raion (district) in Donetsk Oblast of eastern Ukraine, at 116 km SSE from the centre of Donetsk city, at 24 km SW from Novoazovsk.

The settlement was taken under control of pro-Russian forces during the War in Donbas, that started in 2014. On 13 April 2018 the OSCE reported that 2 tanks of the pro-Russian forces had used cover of civilian homes in Verkhnoshyrokivske "endangering residents if tanks were targeted."

== Demographics ==
In 2001 the settlement had 282 inhabitants. Native language as of the 2001 Ukrainian census:

- Ukrainian: 77.66%
- Russian: 21.63%
- Belarusian and Polish: 0.35%
