= Uzhivka, Donetsk Oblast =

Uzhivka Ужівка
- Village
- Location of Uzhivka within Ukraine Uzhivka (Ukraine)
- Coordinates: 47.143056°N 37.855833°E
- Country: Ukraine
- Oblast: Donetsk Oblast
- Raion: Kalmiuske Raion
- Hromada: Novoazovsk urban hromada
- Elevation: 45 m (148 ft)

Population (2001 census)
  - Total: 136
- Time zone: UTC+2 (EET)
  - Summer (DST): UTC+3 (EEST)
- Postal code: 87651
- Area code: +380 6296

Uzhivka (Ukrainian: Ужівка; Russian: Ужовка), also known as Leninske (Ukrainian: Ленінське; Russian: Ленинское) is a village in Kalmiuske Raion (district) in Donetsk Oblast of eastern Ukraine at 122.2 km SSE from the centre of Donetsk city, at 22.6 km WNW from Novoazovsk.

== History ==
The settlement was taken under control of pro-Russian forces during the war in Donbas, that started in mid-April 2014. In 2021, it was the site of a shootout during the Sakhanka and Uzhivka killings.

== Demographics ==
In 2001 the settlement had 136 inhabitants. Native language distribution as of the Ukrainian Census of 2001:

- Ukrainian: 54.56%
- Russian: 14.71%
