= Vilkhivka =

Vilkhivka (Ukrainian: Вільхівка) may refer to the following places in Ukraine:

- Vilkhivka, Chernihiv Oblast
- Vilkhivka, Donetsk Oblast
- Vilkhivka, Ivano-Frankivsk Oblast
- Vilkhivka, Kharkiv Oblast
- Vilkhivka, Rivne Oblast
- Vilkhivka, Volyn Oblast

== See also ==
- Olkhovka, the Russian-language placename, cognate to Vilkhivka
