= Azov, Donetsk Oblast =

Azov Азов
- Village
- Interactive map of Azov
- Location of Azov in Donetsk Oblast Location of Azov in Ukraine
- Coordinates: 47.155833°N 37.861389°E
- Country: Ukraine
- Oblast: Donetsk Oblast
- Raion: Kalmiuske Raion
- Hromada: Novoazovsk urban hromada
- Elevation: 55 m (180 ft)

Population (2001 census)
  - Total: 209
- Time zone: UTC+2 (EET)
  - Summer (DST): UTC+3 (EEST)
- Postal code: 87651
- Area code: +380 6296

Azov (Russian and Ukrainian: Азов), previously known as Dzerzhynske (Ukrainian: Дзержинське), is a village in Novoazovsk Raion of Donetsk Oblast of eastern Ukraine, The village is located 124 km SSE of Donetsk city center.

Azov was captured by Donetsk People's Republic forces during the war in Donbas.

In 2016, the Ukrainian parliament approved renaming the village to Azov as part of decommunization. However, since the separatists with actual control of the village do not recognize this name change, this renaming has not yet gone into effect.

== Demographics ==
The settlement had 209 inhabitants in 2001; native language distribution as of the Ukrainian Census of 2001:

- Ukrainian: 59.33%
- Russian: 40.67%
