= Primorsky =

Primorsky (masculine), Primorskaya (feminine), or Primorskoye (neuter) may refer to:

Divisions

- Primorsky Krai, a federal subject of Russia
- Primorsky District, several districts and city districts in Russia
- Primorskoye Urban Settlement, several municipal urban settlements in Russia
- Primorskaya Oblast, a historical subdivision of the Russian Empire and the early Russian SFSR
- Prymorskyi City District (Primorsky City District), a city district of Odesa, Ukraine

Populated places

- Primorsky, Russia (Primorskaya, Primorskoye), several inhabited localities in Russia
- Prymorskyi (Primorsky), an urban-type settlement in the Autonomous Republic of Crimea, Ukraine

Other

- Primorskaya (Saint Petersburg Metro), a station of the St. Petersburg Metro, St. Petersburg, Russia
- Primorsky Range, Irkutsk Oblast

== See also ==
- Primorsk (disambiguation)
- Primorye (inhabited locality), several inhabited localities in Russia
- Prymorske (disambiguation)
