= Primorsky, Russia =

Primorsky (Russian: Примо́рский; masculine), Primorskaya (Примо́рская; feminine), or Primorskoye (Примо́рское; neuter) is the name of several inhabited localities in Russia.

Urban localities

- Primorsky, Primorsky Krai, an urban-type settlement in Khasansky District of Primorsky Krai

Rural localities

- Primorsky, Chelyabinsk Oblast, a settlement in Primorsky Selsoviet of Agapovsky District of Chelyabinsk Oblast
- Primorsky, Republic of Dagestan, a selo in Bilbilsky Selsoviet of Magaramkentsky District of the Republic of Dagestan
- Primorsky, Balagansky District, Irkutsk Oblast, a settlement in Balagansky District of Irkutsk Oblast
- Primorsky, Osinsky District, Irkutsk Oblast, a settlement in Osinsky District of Irkutsk Oblast
- Primorsky, Republic of Karelia, a settlement in Loukhsky District of the Republic of Karelia
- Primorsky, Krasnoyarsk Krai, a settlement in Anashensky Selsoviet of Novosyolovsky District of Krasnoyarsk Krai
- Primorsky, Rostov Oblast, a settlement in Margaritovskoye Rural Settlement of Azovsky District of Rostov Oblast
- Primorsky, Samara Oblast, a settlement in Stavropolsky District of Samara Oblast
- Primorsky, Kalachyovsky District, Volgograd Oblast, a khutor in Primorsky Selsoviet of Kalachyovsky District of Volgograd Oblast
- Primorsky, Kotelnikovsky District, Volgograd Oblast, a settlement in Pugachevsky Selsoviet of Kotelnikovsky District of Volgograd Oblast
- Primorskoye, Kaliningrad Oblast, a settlement in Pogranichny Rural Okrug of Bagrationovsky District of Kaliningrad Oblast
- Primorskoye, Ulyanovsk Oblast, a selo in Lebyazhinsky Rural Okrug of Melekessky District of Ulyanovsk Oblast
