= Primorskoye Urban Settlement =

Primorskoye Urban Settlement is the name of several municipal formations in Russia.

- Primorskoye Urban Settlement, a municipal formation which the town of district significance of Primorsk in Baltiysky District of Kaliningrad Oblast is incorporated as
- Primorskoye Urban Settlement, a municipal formation corresponding to Primorskoye Settlement Municipal Formation, an administrative division of Vyborgsky District of Leningrad Oblast
- Primorskoye Urban Settlement, a municipal formation which the urban-type settlement of Primorsky in Khasansky District of Primorsky Krai is incorporated as

== See also ==
- Primorsky
