= Primorye (inhabited locality) =

Inhabited locality name

Primorye (Russian: Примо́рье) is the name of several inhabited localities in Russia:

- Primorye, Kaliningrad Oblast, an urban locality (an urban-type settlement) in Svetlogorsky District of Kaliningrad Oblast
- Primorye, Perm Krai, a rural locality (a village) in Chastinsky District of Perm Krai

== See also ==
- Primorsky Krai, a federal subject of Russia informally known as Primorye
- Primorsk (disambiguation)
- Primorsky (disambiguation)
