= Prymorske, Mariupol =

Coordinates: 47.0839°N 37.7108°E

Prymorske
- Interactive map of Prymorske
- Country: Ukraine
- Oblast: Donetsk Oblast
- Raion: Novoazovsk Raion
- Time zone: UTC+2 (EET)
  - Summer (DST): UTC+3 (EEST)

Prymorske is a former village in Ukraine that in 2015 was merged with the city of Mariupol (Ordzhonikidze Raion).

Until 2014, Prymorske was part of Novoazovsk Raion when due to the 2014 Russian aggression it was transferred to Volnovakha Raion.
