= Zhdanivka =

City in Donetsk Oblast, Ukraine

Zhdanivka Жданівка Ждановка
- City
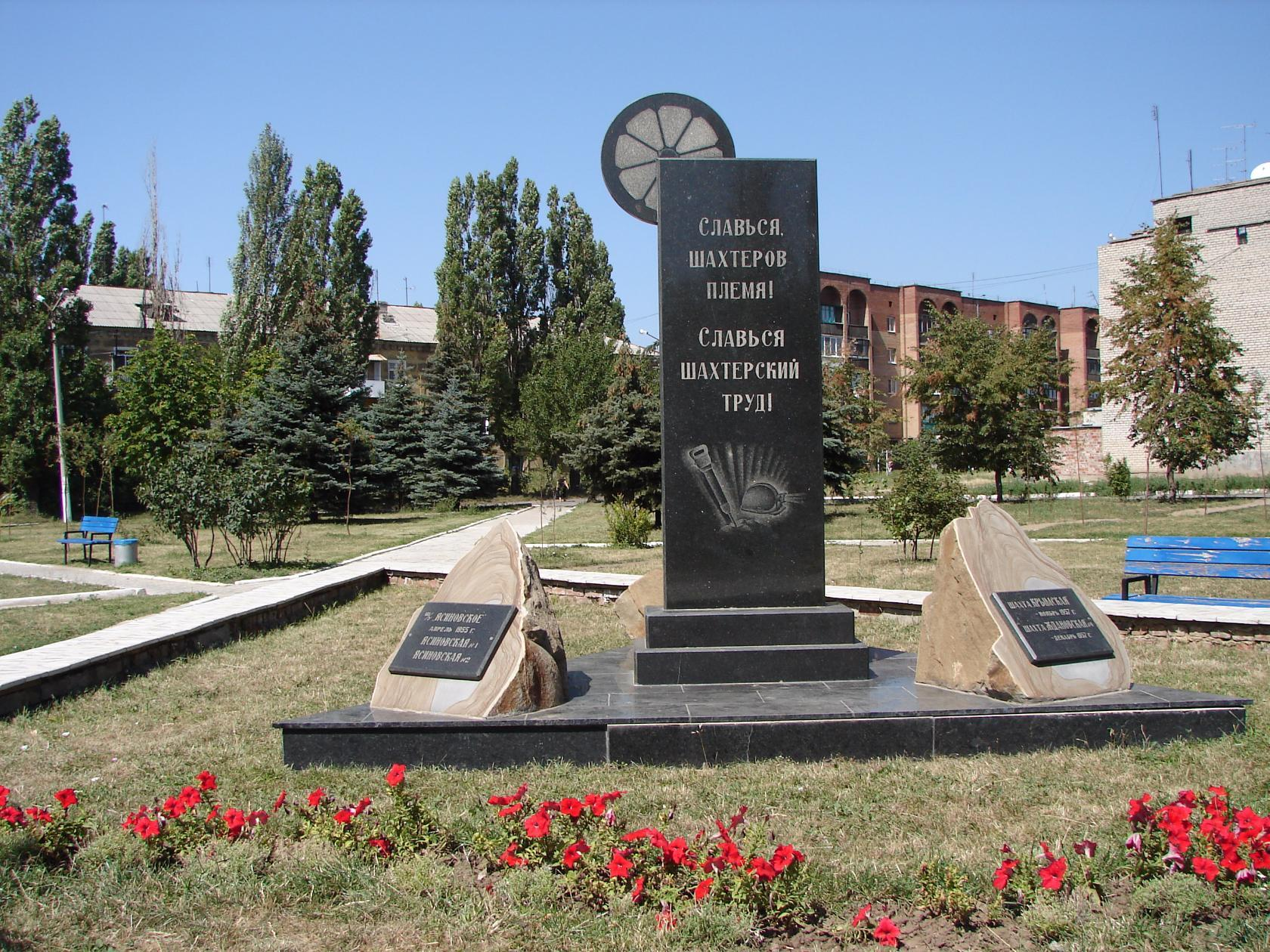
- Monument to miners

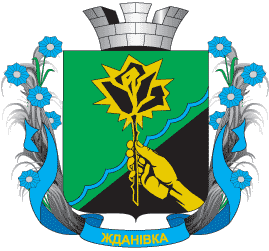
- Flag Coat of arms
- Interactive map of Zhdanivka
- Location within Donetsk Oblast Location within Ukraine
- Coordinates: 48°8′15″N 38°15′39″E
- Country: Ukraine
- Oblast: Donetsk Oblast
- Raion: Horlivka Raion
- Hromada: Zhdanivka urban hromada

Government
  - Mayor: Serhiy Lytvynov

Population (2022)
  - Total: 11,867
- Climate: Dfb

Zhdanivka or Zhdanovka (Ukrainian: Жданівка, pronounced [ˈʒdɑn⁽ʲ⁾iu̯kɐ]; Russian: Ждановка) is a small city in the Donetsk Oblast, in eastern Ukraine. The city has a population of 11,867 (2022 estimate). The city is occupied by regular Russian and pro-Russian proxy forces since 2014.

== General information ==
It occupies an area of 2 km², of which 72% is under construction. One inhabitant has 20 m² of green spaces. The average temperature in January is −7.2 °C, in July +22 °C. Annual rainfall is 500 mm.

The population on 5 December 2001 was 13.7 thousand people, at the beginning of 2004 it was 13.2 thousand people. More than 70% are employed in the national economy and work in industry. The main businesses are mines.

In the city there is a church of the Dormition of the Mother of God, a women's monastery is being created.

In the administrative plan, Zhdanivka is subordinated to the urban-type villages of Vilkhivka, 1 rural settlement.

== History ==
Starting Mid-April 2014 pro-Russian separatists captured several towns in Donetsk Oblast; including Zhdanivka. On 16 August 2014, Ukrainian forces reportedly secured the city from the pro-Russian separatists.

On 20 September 2014, Ukrainian troops left the city due to the threat of encirclement. Since then, it has remained under control of the so-called Donetsk People's Republic.

== Demographics ==
According to the 2001 census, the population of the city was 13,266 people, of which 10.94% stated that their mother tongue was Ukrainian, 88.05% - Russian, 0.35% - Armenian, 0.29% - Belarusian, 0.04% - Moldovan, 0.02% - Polish and Greek. As of the Ukrainian Census of 2001:

Ethnicity

- Ukrainians: 48.3%
- Russians: 47.4%
- Belarusians: 1.4%

Language

- Russian: 88.05%
- Ukrainian: 10.94%
- Armenian: 0.35%
- Belarusian: 0.29%
