= Zhdanivka urban hromada =

Zhdanivka urban hromada Жданівська міська громада
- Hromada
- Interactive map of Zhdanivka urban hromada
- Country: Ukraine
- Oblast: Donetsk
- Raion: Horlivka
- Settlements: 5
- Cities: 1
- Rural settlements: 1
- Villages: 2
- Towns: 1

Zhdanivka urban hromada (Ukrainian: Жданівська міська громада) is a hromada of Ukraine, located in Horlivka Raion, Donetsk Oblast. Its administrative center is the city Zhdanivka.

The hromada contains 5 settlements: 1 city (Zhdanivka), 1 urban-type settlement (Vilkhivka), 2 villages (Rozivka and Shevchenko), and 1 rural-type settlement (Molodiy Shakhtar).

== See also ==
- List of hromadas of Ukraine
