= Novoazovsk urban hromada =

Novoazovsk urban hromada Новоазовська міська громада
- Hromada
- Interactive map of Novoazovsk urban hromada
- Country: Ukraine
- Oblast: Donetsk Oblast
- Raion: Kalmiuske Raion
- Settlements: 37
- Cities: 1
- Rural settlements: 1
- Villages: 34
- Towns: 1

Novoazovsk urban hromada (Ukrainian: Новоазовська міська громада) is a hromada of Ukraine, located in Kalmiuske Raion, Donetsk Oblast. Its administrative center is the city Novoazovsk.

The hromada contains 37 settlements: 1 city (Novoazovsk), 2 rural settlements (Siedove and Obryv), 34 villages:

- Azov
- Bezimenne
- Bessarabka
- Vaniushkyne
- Vedenske
- Verkhnioshyrokivske
- Vesele
- Vitava
- Huselshchykove
- Kachkarske
- Kozlivka
- Mytkovo-Kachkari
- Klynkyne
- Kovske
- Kozatske
- Kuznetsi
- Kulykove
- Markyne
- Naberezhne
- Oleksandrivske
- Patriotychne
- Pervomaiske
- Prymorske
- Porokhnia
- Roza
- Samiilove
- Samsonove
- Sakhanka
- Sosnivske
- Siedovo-Vasylivka
- Ukrainske
- Uzhivka
- Kholodne
- Khomutove
- Khreshchatytske
- Shevchenko
- Shcherbak

== See also ==
- List of hromadas of Ukraine
