= Primorsky District =

Location of Arkhangelsk Oblast in Russia

Location of Saint Petersburg in Russia

Primorsky District is the name of several administrative and municipal districts in Russia. The name literally means "near the sea".

== Districts of the federal subjects ==
- Primorsky District, Arkhangelsk Oblast, an administrative and municipal district of Arkhangelsk Oblast
- Primorsky District, Saint Petersburg, an administrative district of the federal city of St. Petersburg

== City divisions ==
Location of Novorossiysk in Russia
- Primorsky City District, Novorossiysk, a city district of Novorossiysk, a city in Krasnodar Krai

== Former districts ==
- Primorsky District, Leningrad Oblast, an administrative district of Leningrad Oblast between 1948 and 1954 (previously known as Koyvistovsky District).

== See also ==
- Primorsky (disambiguation)
- Primorsky Military District
