= Olkhovka, Bizhbulyaksky District, Republic of Bashkortostan =

Olkhovka Ольховка
- Village
- Location within Bashkortostan Location within Russia
- Coordinates: 53°31′N 54°34′E
- Country: Russia
- Region: Bashkortostan
- District: Bizhbulyaksky District
- Time zone: UTC+5:00

Olkhovka (Russian: Ольховка) is a rural locality (a village) in Dyomsky Selsoviet, Bizhbulyaksky District, Bashkortostan, Russia. The population was 151 as of 2010. There are 3 streets.

== Geography ==
Olkhovka is located 33 km southeast of Bizhbulyak (the district's administrative centre) by road. Dyomsky is the nearest rural locality.
