= Primorsk, Volgograd Oblast =

Primorsk Приморск
- Settlement
- Location within Volgograd Oblast Location within Russia
- Coordinates: 49°16′N 45°01′E
- Country: Russia
- Region: Volgograd Oblast
- District: Bykovsky District
- Time zone: UTC+4:00

Primorsk (Russian: Приморск) is a rural locality (a settlement) and the administrative center of Primorskoye Rural Settlement, Bykovsky District, Volgograd Oblast, Russia. The population was 3,159 as of 2010. There are 33 streets.

== Geography ==
Primorsk is located on the left bank of the Volga River, in Zavolzhye, 69 km south of Bykovo (the district's administrative centre) by road. Gornovodyanoye is the nearest rural locality.
