= Prymorske, Kalmiuske Raion, Donetsk Oblast =

Coordinates: 47.3208°N 37.9439°E

Prymorske Приморське
- Village
- Interactive map of Prymorske
- Country: Ukraine
- Oblast: Donetsk Oblast
- Raion: Kalmiuske Raion
- Hromada: Novoazovsk urban hromada
- Time zone: UTC+2 (EET)
  - Summer (DST): UTC+3 (EEST)

Prymorske (Ukrainian: Приморське) is a village in Kalmiuske Raion, Donetsk Oblast, Ukraine. It is situated in the southeastern part of the Donetsk Oblast near the Sea of Azov, northeast of Sosnivske. Administratively, it falls under the Novoazovsk urban hromada. As of the last comprehensive census, the village had a population of 1,407 people in 2007.

== Time Zone ==
Prymorske follows Eastern European Time (EET), which is UTC+2 standard time and UTC+3 during Daylight Saving Time.

== Languages spoken ==
Prymorske's native languages are Ukrainian and Russian, while minority languages include Greek (specifically Rumeika and Urum) and Armenian, due to migration patterns along the Sea of Azov. Also, many residents speak Surzhyk - a hybrid sociolect that blends Ukrainian grammar and pronunciation with Russian vocabulary - in everyday casual conversation. According to the Constitution of Ukraine, Ukrainian is the sole official state language, applying to Prymorske as well as the rest of Ukraine. However, since the village was occupied by Russian and DPR forces in 2014 and subject to an unrecognised annexation claim by the Russian Federation in 2022, Russian has been enforced as the sole language of public administration, courts, law enforcement and education.
