= Olkhovka, Dobryanka, Perm Krai =

Olkhovka Ольховка
- Settlement
- Location within Perm Krai Location within Russia
- Coordinates: 58°40′N 56°14′E
- Country: Russia
- Region: Perm Krai
- District: Dobryansky District
- Time zone: UTC+5:00

Olkhovka (Russian: Ольховка) is a rural locality (a settlement) in Dobryansky District, Perm Krai, Russia. The population was 107 as of 2010. There are 7 streets.
