= Primorsky, Kalachyovsky District, Volgograd Oblast =

Primorsky Приморский
- Khutor
- Location within Volgograd Oblast Location within Russia
- Coordinates: 48°34′N 43°32′E
- Country: Russia
- Region: Volgograd Oblast
- District: Kalachyovsky District

Population
  - Total: 497
- Time zone: UTC+4:00

Primorsky (Russian: Приморский) is a rural locality (a khutor) and the administrative center of Primorskoye Rural Settlement, Kalachyovsky District, Volgograd Oblast, Russia. The population was 497 as of 2010. There are 11 streets.

== Geography ==
Primorsky is located 53 km south of Kalach-na-Donu (the district's administrative centre) by road. Kolpachki is the nearest rural locality.
