= Mirror Stream =

Fountain in Kharkiv, Ukraine

Coordinates: 49°59′55″N 36°14′05″E

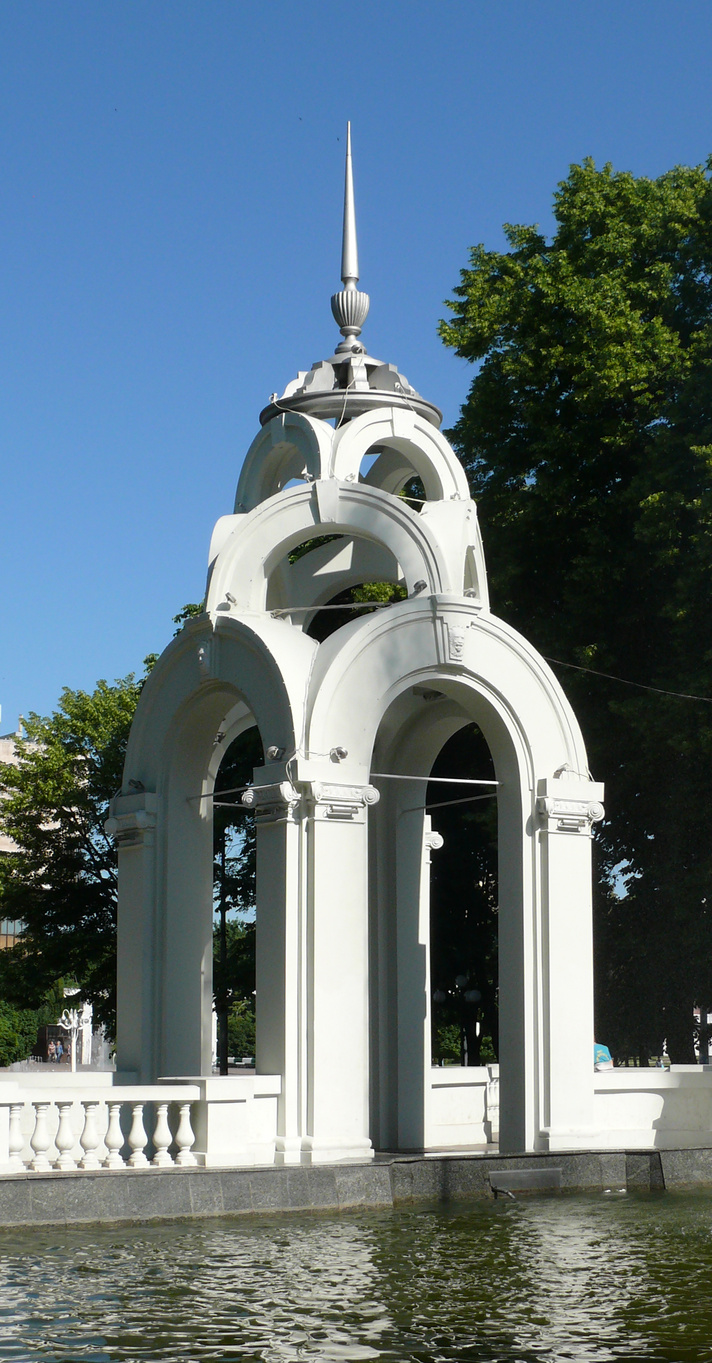
Mirror Stream

Mirror Stream (Ukrainian: Дзеркальний струмінь, Dzerkalʹnyi struminʹ; Russian: Зеркальная струя, Zerkalnaya Struya) is a fountain in Kharkiv, Ukraine. The natural fountain was discovered in 1947.

The fountain is near the Kharkiv Philharmonic. It was built in 1947. It remains one of the most remarkable architectural monuments in Kharkiv and, due to that, has been listed in UNESCO's Encyclopedia.

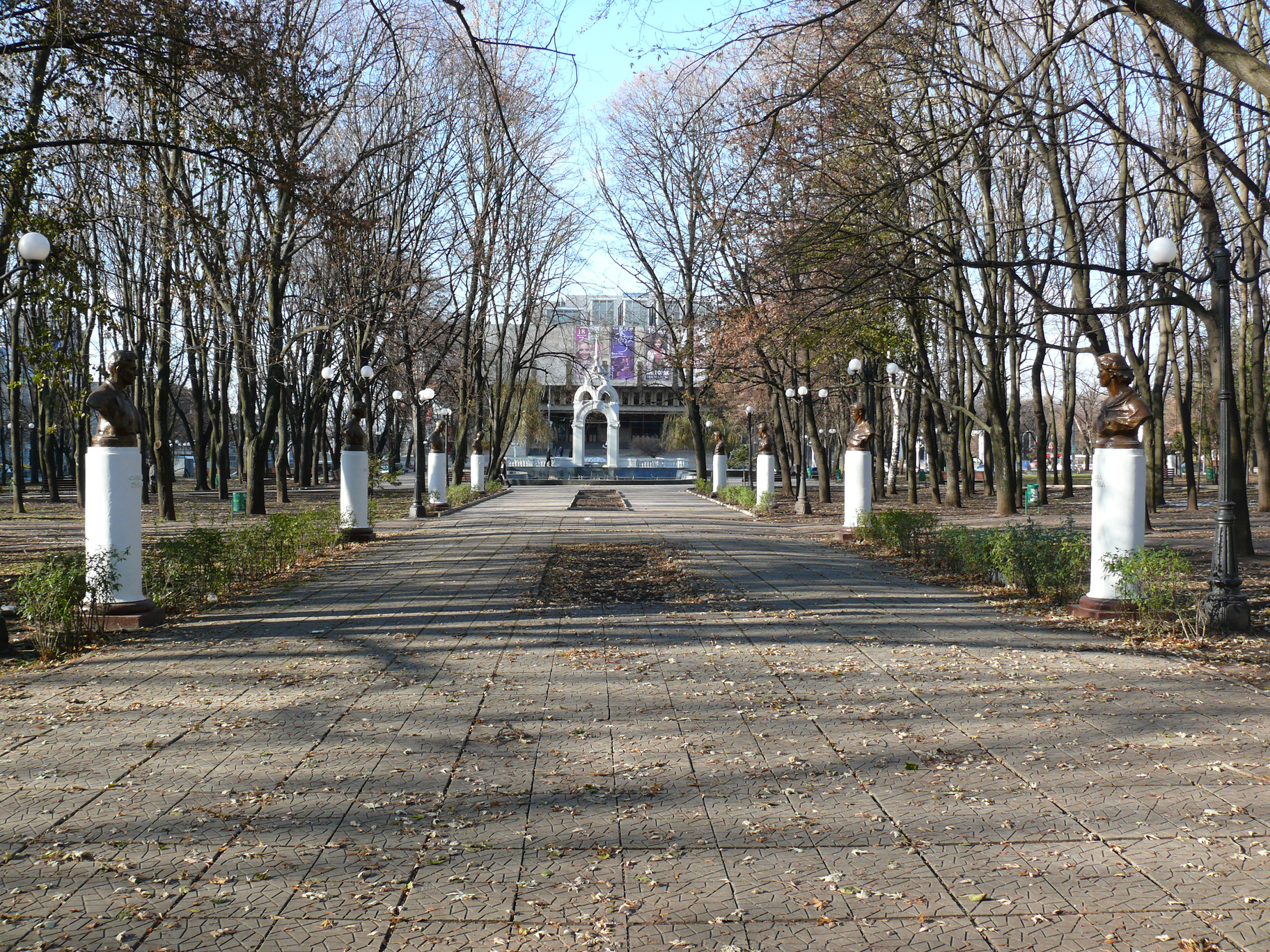
Former "Komsomol Heroes Alley" as photographed in 2007

A "Komsomol Heroes Alley" with busts of young World War II heroes was located behind the fountain from 1958 until 2013. The busts were removed during the construction of the new church Khram Svyatykh Zhon-Myronosytsʹ, due to the 2015 decommunization laws they have never returned.

== Cultural references and interesting facts ==
- The Mirror Stream is one of the symbols of Kharkiv. Similar gazebos are also considered urban symbols in other major cities of Left-Bank Ukraine, including Sumy and Poltava.
- Since the 1980s, the Kharkiv Confectionery Factory has produced boxed chocolates named "Mirror Stream", featuring an image of the landmark.
- A music festival named "Zerkalnaya Struya" has been held in Kharkiv, featuring classical music concerts and events involving Kharkiv musicians.
- The name "Mirror Stream" is also used by the Kharkiv rock project "Zerkalnaya Struya".

== Gallery ==
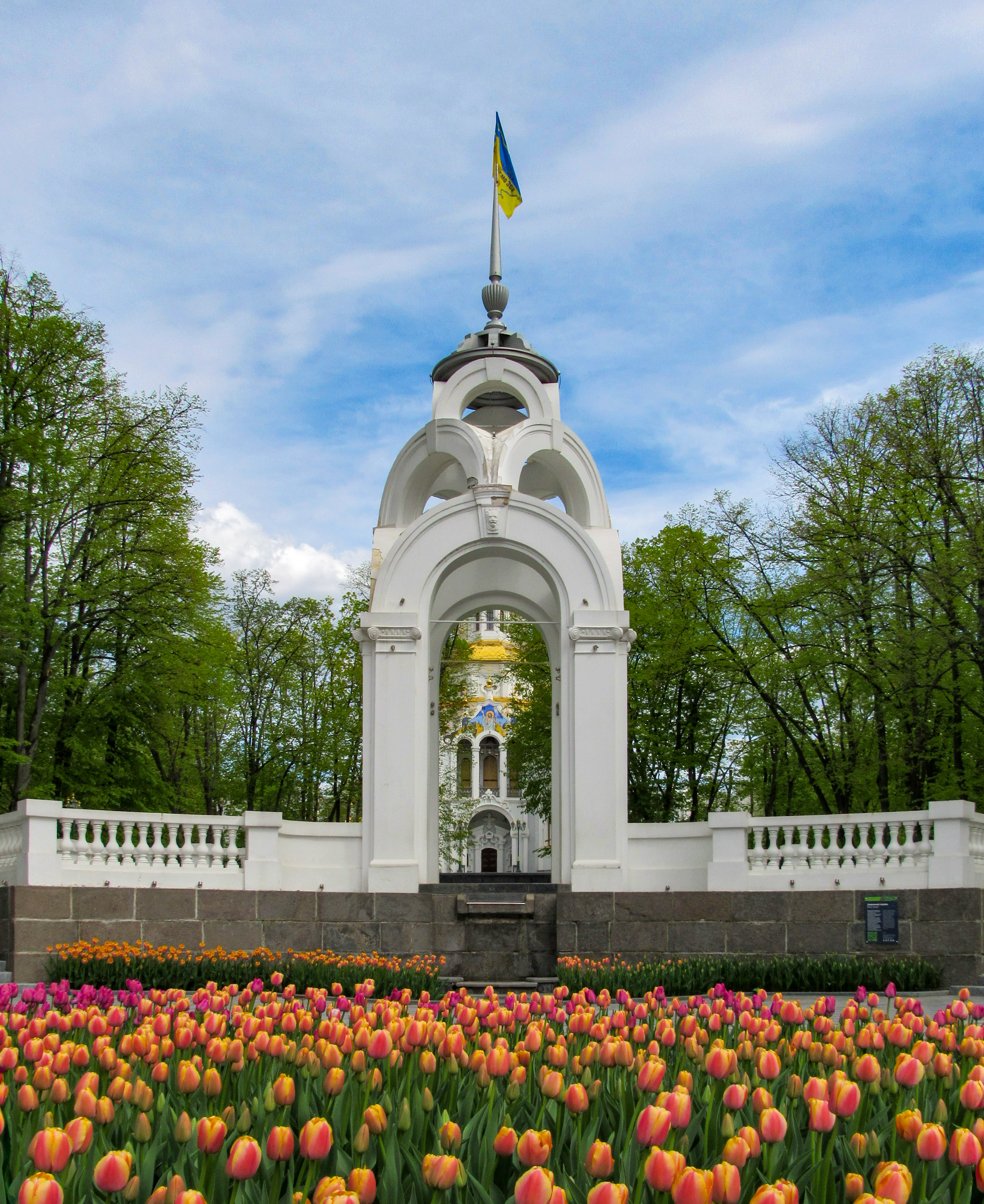
Fountain in spring

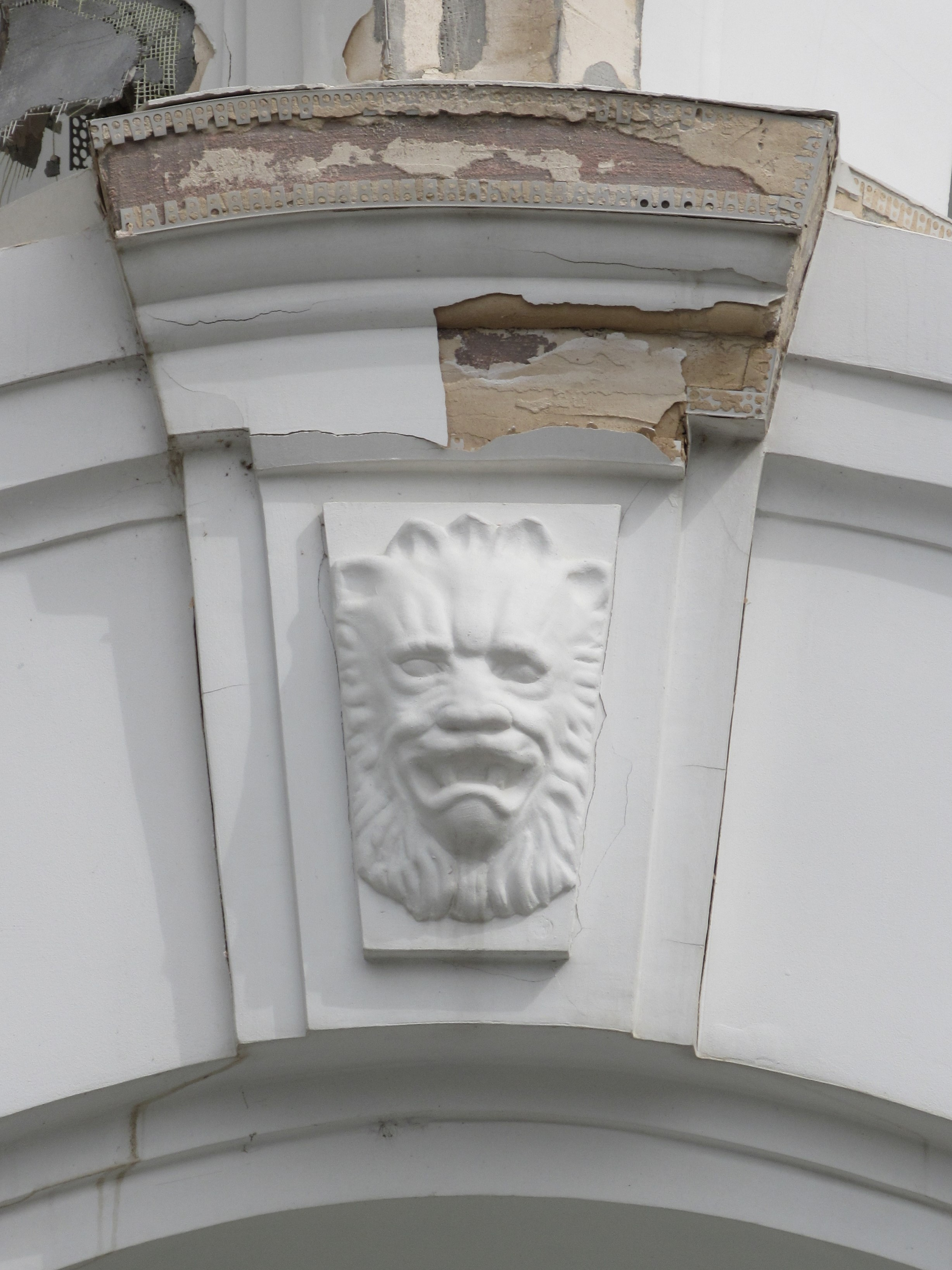
Stucco on the keystone

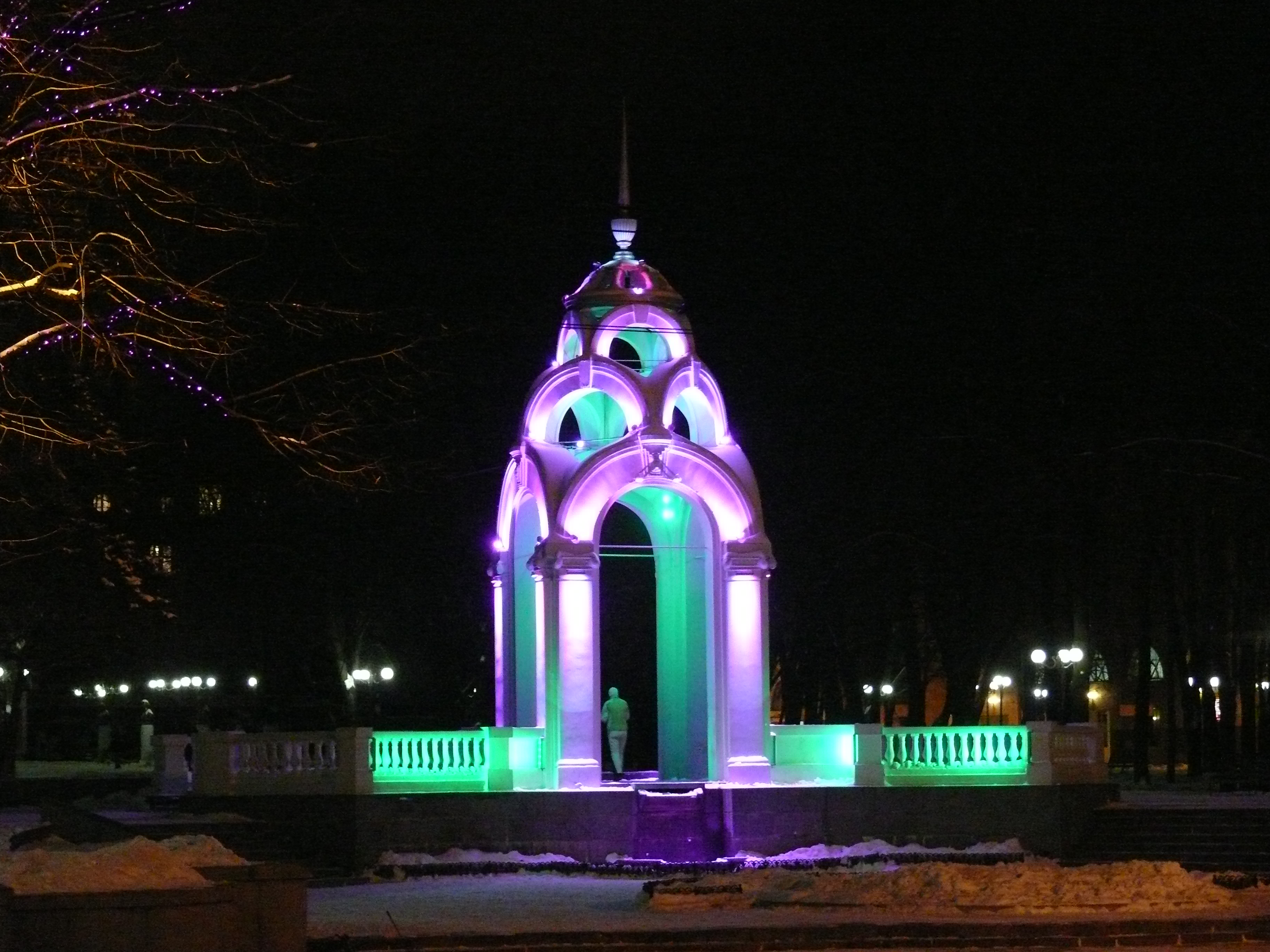
Gazebo at night
