= Bezimenne, Donetsk Oblast =

Bezimenne Безіменне
- Village
- Interactive map of Bezimenne
- Location of Bezimenne within Ukraine Bezimenne (Ukraine)
- Coordinates: 47°6′18″N 37°56′5″E
- Country: Ukraine
- Oblast: Donetsk Oblast
- Raion: Novoazovsk Raion
- Hromada: Novoazovsk urban hromada
- Founded: 1799
- Elevation: 14 m (46 ft)

Population (2001 census)
  - Total: 2,645
- Time zone: UTC+2 (EET)
  - Summer (DST): UTC+3 (EEST)
- Postal code: 87660
- Area code: +380 6296

Bezimenne (Ukrainian: Безіменне; Russian: Безыменное) is a village in Novoazovsk Raion (district) in Donetsk Oblast of eastern Ukraine at 133 km SSE from the centre of Donetsk city, on the shore of the Sea of Azov.

The settlement was taken under control of pro-Russian forces during the war in Donbas, which started in 2014.

== Demographics ==
Native language as of the Ukrainian Census of 2001:

- Ukrainian: 45.19%
- Russian: 53.71%
- Armenian: 0.80%
- Greek (including Mariupol Greek and Urum): 0.08%
- Bulgarian, German, and Moldavian (Romanian): 0.04%

== Notable people ==
- Oleksandr Kasyan, Ukrainian football player of Armenian descent
