= Primorsky, Republic of Dagestan =

Primorsky Приморский Гьуьлуьнпатал
- Selo
- Location within Republic of Dagestan Location within Russia
- Coordinates: 41°50′N 48°34′E
- Country: Russia
- Region: Republic of Dagestan
- District: Magaramkentsky District
- Time zone: UTC+3:00

Primorsky (Russian: Приморский; Lezgian: Гьуьлуьнпатал) is a rural locality (a selo) in Bilbilsky Selsoviet, Magaramkentsky District, Republic of Dagestan, Russia. The population was 519 as of 2010. There are 18 streets.

== Geography ==
Primorsky is located 43 km northeast of Magaramkent (the district's administrative centre) by road. Bilbil-Kazmalyar and Khtun-Kazmalyar are the nearest rural localities.

== Nationalities ==
Lezgins live there and are the majority. Due to being right next to the Azerbaijani border, Azeris also live in Primorsk as a significant minority. Russians also live there.
