= Olkhovka, Chernushinsky District, Perm Krai =

Olkhovka Ольховка
- Village
- Location within Perm Krai Location within Russia
- Coordinates: 56°34′N 56°27′E
- Country: Russia
- Region: Perm Krai
- District: Chernushinsky District
- Time zone: UTC+5:00

Olkhovka (Russian: Ольховка) is a rural locality (a village) in Chernushinsky District, Perm Krai, Russia. The population was 2 as of 2010.

== Geography ==
Olkhovka is located 28 km northeast of Chernushka (the district's administrative centre) by road. Kazantsevo is the nearest rural locality.
