= Olkhovka, Cherdynsky District, Perm Krai =

Olkhovka Ольховка
- Settlement
- Location within Perm Krai Location within Russia
- Coordinates: 60°40′N 55°34′E
- Country: Russia
- Region: Perm Krai
- District: Cherdynsky District
- Time zone: UTC+5:00

Olkhovka (Russian: Ольховка) is a rural locality (a settlement) in Cherdynsky District, Perm Krai, Russia. The population was 170 as of 2010. There are 9 streets.

== Geography ==
Olkhovka is located 68 km northwest of Cherdyn (the district's administrative centre) by road. Ust-Kaib is the nearest rural locality.
