= Olkhovka, Kuyurgazinsky District, Republic of Bashkortostan =

Olkhovka Ольховка
- Khutor
- Location within Bashkortostan Location within Russia
- Coordinates: 52°39′N 55°50′E
- Country: Russia
- Region: Bashkortostan
- District: Kuyurgazinsky District
- Time zone: UTC+5:00

Olkhovka (Russian: Ольховка) is a rural locality (a khutor) in Otradinsky Selsoviet, Kuyurgazinsky District, Bashkortostan, Russia. The population was 16 as of 2010. There is one street.

== Geography ==
Olkhovka is located 9 km south of Yermolayevo (the district's administrative centre) by road. Novaya Otrada is the nearest rural locality.
