= Olkhovka, Tuymazinsky District, Republic of Bashkortostan =

Olkhovka Ольховка
- Village
- Location within Bashkortostan Location within Russia
- Coordinates: 54°27′N 53°47′E
- Country: Russia
- Region: Bashkortostan
- District: Tuymazinsky District
- Time zone: UTC+5:00

Olkhovka (Russian: Ольховка) is a rural locality (a village) in Nikolayevsky Selsoviet, Tuymazinsky District, Bashkortostan, Russia. The population was 8 as of 2010. There is 1 street.

== Geography ==
Olkhovka is located 21 km south of Tuymazy (the district's administrative centre) by road. Samsykovo is the nearest rural locality.
