= Olkhovka (settlement), Permsky District, Perm Krai =

Olkhovka Ольховка
- Settlement
- Location within Perm Krai Location within Russia
- Coordinates: 57°44′N 55°47′E
- Country: Russia
- Region: Perm Krai
- District: Permsky District
- Time zone: UTC+5:00

Olkhovka (Russian: Ольховка) is a rural locality (a settlement) in Yugo-Kamskoye Rural Settlement, Permsky District, Perm Krai, Russia. The population was 19 as of 2010.

== Geography ==
It is located 19 km north-east from Yugo-Kamsky.
