= Olkhovka (village), Permsky District, Perm Krai =

Olkhovka Ольховка
- Village
- Location within Perm Krai Location within Russia
- Coordinates: 57°55′N 55°46′E
- Country: Russia
- Region: Perm Krai
- District: Permsky District
- Time zone: UTC+5:00

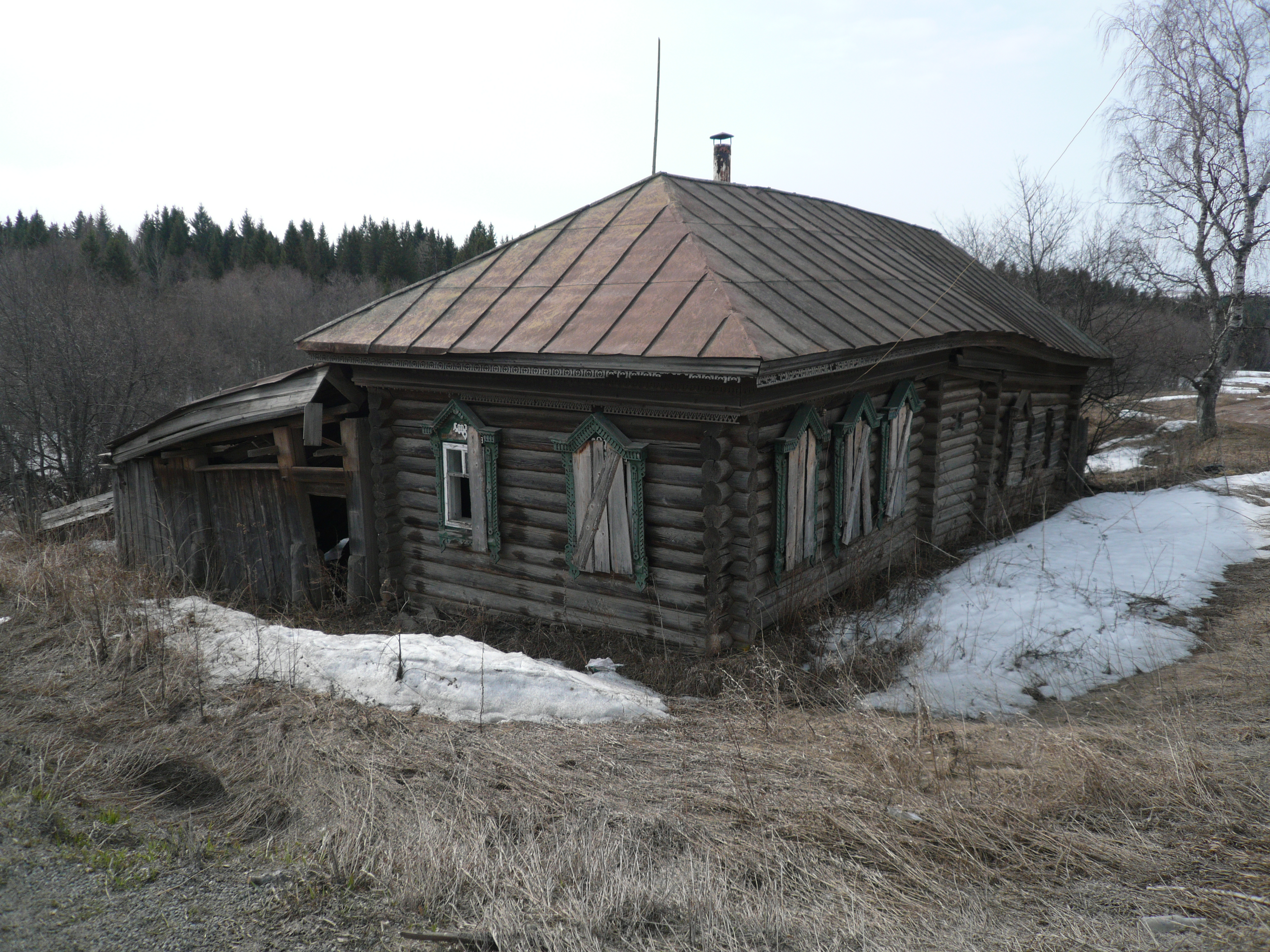
An abandoned house in Olkhovka

Olkhovka (Russian: Ольховка) is a rural locality (a village) in Zabolotskoye Rural Settlement, Permsky District, Perm Krai, Russia. The population was 15 as of 2010.

== Geography ==
It is located 3.5 km south-east from Gorshki.
