= Olkhovka, Blagoveshchensky District, Republic of Bashkortostan =

Olkhovka Ольховка
- Village
- Location within Bashkortostan Location within Russia
- Coordinates: 55°08′N 56°10′E
- Country: Russia
- Region: Bashkortostan
- District: Blagoveshchensky District
- Time zone: UTC+5:00

Olkhovka (Russian: Ольховка) is a rural locality (a village) in Novonadezhdinsky Selsoviet, Blagoveshchensky District, Bashkortostan, Russia. The population was 2 as of 2010. There is 1 street.

== Geography ==
Olkhovka is located 24 km northeast of Blagoveshchensk (the district's administrative centre) by road. Sergeyevka is the nearest rural locality.
