= Vilkhivka, Donetsk Oblast =

Urban locality in Donetsk Oblast, Ukraine

Vilkhivka Вільхівка
- Rural settlement
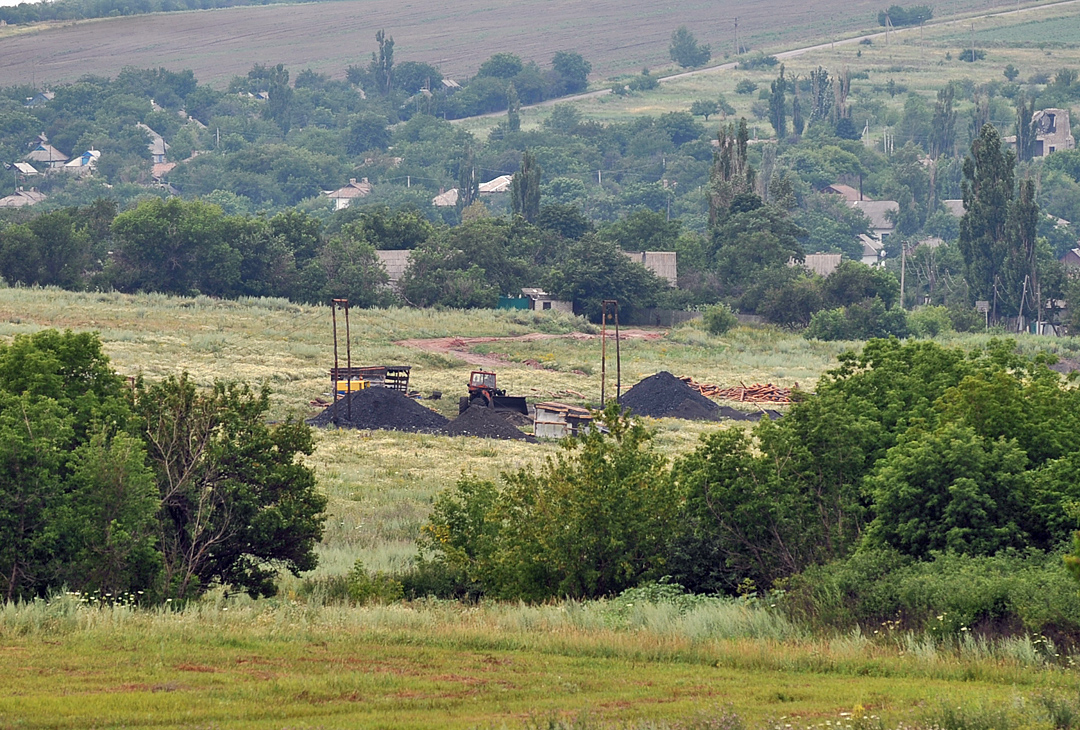

- Location of Vilkhivka Vilkhivka (Ukraine)
- Coordinates: 48°06′46″N 38°18′39″E
- Country: Ukraine
- Oblast: Donetsk Oblast
- Raion: Horlivka Raion
- Elevation: 141 m (463 ft)

Population (2022)
  - Total: 724
- Time zone: UTC+2
  - Summer (DST): UTC+3
- Postal code: 86595
- Area code: +380 6250

Vilkhivka (Ukrainian: Вільхівка) is a rural settlement in Zhdanivka urban hromada, Horlivka Raion, Donetsk Oblast, eastern Ukraine. Population: 724 (2022 estimate).

== Demographics ==
Native language as of the Ukrainian Census of 2001:

- Ukrainian 19.15%
- Russian 80.85%
