= Novoazovsk Raion =

Former subdivision of Donetsk Oblast, Ukraine, in use by the Donetsk People's Republic

Novoazovsk Raion Новоазовський район
- Raion
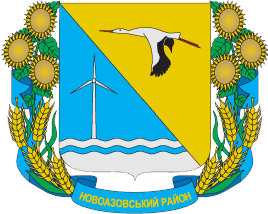
- Flag Coat of arms

- Coordinates: 47°06′42″N 38°04′57″E
- Country: Ukraine
- Region: Donetsk Oblast
- Established: 1923
- Disestablished: 18 July 2020
- Admin. center: Novoazovsk (de jure); Vynohradne (de facto)
- Subdivisions: List: — city councils; — settlement councils; — rural councils; Number of localities: — cities; — urban-type settlements; 52 — villages; — rural settlements

Government
  - Governor: Vasily Ovcharov (Russian installed)

Area
  - Total: 818.612 km^{2} (316.068 sq mi)

Population (2020)
  - Total: 26,952
  - Density: 32.924/km^{2} (85.273/sq mi)
- Time zone: UTC+02:00 (EET)
  - Summer (DST): UTC+03:00 (EEST)
- Postal index: 876-XX
- Area code: 380
- Website: http://novoazovsk.net/ https://novoazovsk.gosuslugi.ru/ (Russian administered)

Novoazovsk Raion (Ukrainian: Новоазовський район, romanized: Novoazovs'kyi raion; Russian: Новоазовский район, romanized: Novoazovskiy raion) was one of the administrative raions (a district) of Donetsk Oblast in eastern Ukraine. The raion was abolished on 18 July 2020 as part of the administrative reform of Ukraine, which reduced the number of raions of Donetsk Oblast to eight. However, since 2014 much of the raion was not under control of Ukrainian government and has been part of the Donetsk People's Republic which continues using it as an administrative unit. Its administrative center was located in the city of Novoazovsk, and its southern portion borders the Sea of Azov. The last estimate of the raion population, reported by the Ukrainian government, was 26,952 (2020 est.).

== Location and division ==
Novoazovsk Raion bordered the city of Mariupol (Illich and Ordzhonikidze raions of Mariupol) to its west and has the international Russia–Ukraine border to its east. To its northwest, Novoazovsk Raion shared borders with Manhush Raion. To its north, Novoazovsk Raion borders Telmanove Raion.

The raion was divided into 15 municipal councils: one city municipality, one town municipality and 13 - rural councils. Within Novoazovsk Raion there were one city, Novoazovsk, one urban-type settlement (Sedovo), 9 selsoviets, and 59 small settlements. Also included within the raion are 14 industrial organizations, 4 construction and transport organizations, 9 kolkhozy, 5 sovhozy, 3 fisheries cooperatives (rybkolhozy), 5 industrial organizations, 4 construction companies, 35 medical schools, 27 resort areas, and 26 libraries.

== History ==
Before the defeat of the Don Republic by the Red Army in 1920, the territory of the Novoazovsk Raion was part of the Taganrog Okrug of the Don Republic. In April of the same year, the territory as the Taganrog Raion was ceded to the newly organized Donets Governorate.

In the beginning of 1923, the Novo-Mykolayivka Raion was organized. On 22 September 1923, the administrative center of the Novo-Mykolayivka Raion, Novo-Mykolayivka, was renamed Budyonivka, and the Raion became Budyonivka Raion. In 1958, the Budyonivka Raion was again renamed, becoming the Novoazovsk Raion, and its administrative center was renamed Novoazovsk.

Within the Novoazovsk Raion, were born the Arctic explorer Georgy Sedov, the general-polkovnik Hero of the Soviet Union I. Lyudnikov, poet N. Scherbina, and the sculptor N. Yasinenko.

Following the events surrounding the war in Donbas, the western part of the raion remained under control of the Ukrainian government, whereas most of the area was under administration of the Donetsk People's Republic. To facilitate the administration, on 9 December 2014, the Verkhovna Rada, Ukraine's national parliament, changed the boundaries and total area of the Novoazovsk Raion to encompass 818.612 km^{2} (316.068 mi^{2}). The district's administration buildings and government were moved to the urban-type settlement of Vynohradne. The amended area of the raion is under control of the Donetsk People's Republic.

== Demographics ==
According to the 2001 Ukrainian Census:

Ethnicity		
Ukrainians	26,123	67.2%
Russians	11,494	29.5%
Greeks	389	1.0%
Belarusians	208	0.5%
Germans	182	0.5%

== Environment ==
- The nature preserve Khomytovs'ka steppe or Khomutovskyy steppe (Ukrainian: Хомуто́вський степ, Russian: Хомутовская степь), part of the Ukrainian steppe National Park, is a nature preserve located within the oblast. Having an area is 10.28 km^{2}, the preserve consists of many types of flora. It is currently listed in the UNESCO list of natural monuments.
- The regional park Meotyda (Ukrainian: Меотида, Russian: Меотида) is a natural park with a total area of 130.17 km^{2}. The park contains over 640 types of rare and unique flora, 15 of which are listed in Ukraine's Red Book of Rare Species.

== Settlements ==
- Siedove (Ukrainian: Сєдове; Russian: Седово; formerly: Kryva Kosa) is an urban-type settlement (townlet) with a population of 2,770. Formerly a kolhoz by the name of Zavet Il'icha, the urban-type settlement now consists of the Kholodne and Obryv settlements.
- Bezimenne (Ukrainian: Безіменне; Russian: Безыменное; literally: No-name) is a village (selo) with a population of 2,529. It used to be known as the Druzhba Narodiv kolhoz. The village now consists of the following settlements: Vedens'ke, Vesele, Kachkars'ke, Mitkogo-Kacharki, Pavlovs'ke, Patriotychne and Roza.
- Vynohradne (Ukrainian: Виноградне; Russian: Виноградное) is a village (selo) with a population of 1,856. Formerly known as the Rodyna kolhoz, it now consists of the Pioners'ke, Prymors'ke and Kalynovka settlements.
- Kominternove (Ukrainian: Комінтернове; Russian: Коминтерново) is a village (selo) with a population of 494. It used to be known as the Ohorodnyi kolhoz. The village now consists of the Dzerzhyns'ke, Zaichenko, Leninske, Nova Tavria, and Novobydogo settlements.
- Krasnoarmiis'ke (Ukrainian: Красноармійське; Russian: Красноармейское) is a village (selo) with a population of 1,191. Formerly known as the Zaria Komunyzna kolhoz, the village now consists of the Kozats'ke, Kulykogo, Oktyabr, Porokhnia and Shevchenko settlements.

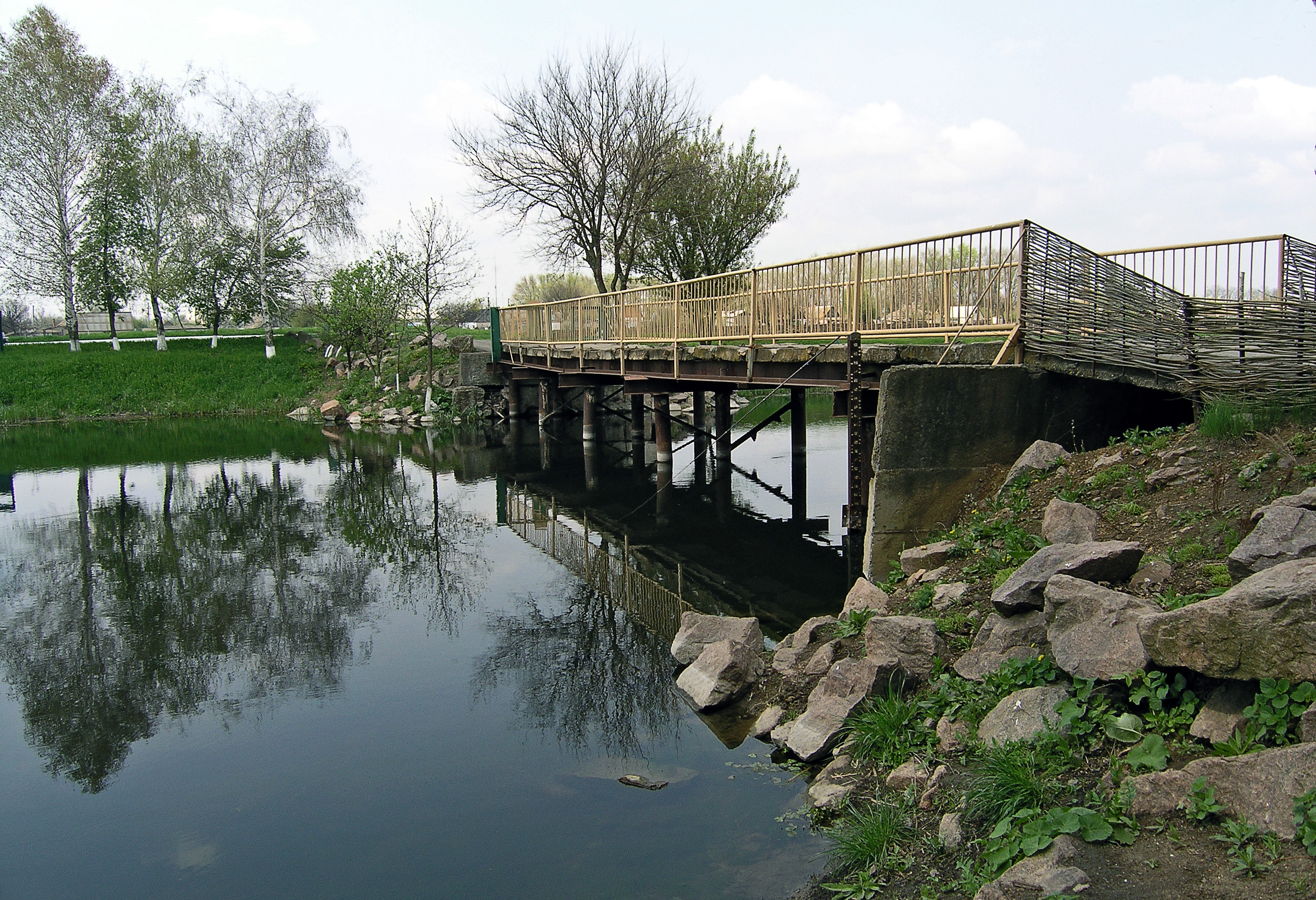
A wooden bridge leads to the entrance to the Khomytovs'ka steppe natural preserve.

- Pavlopil' (Ukrainian: Павлопіль; Russian: Павлополь) is a village (selo) with a population of 615. Formerly known as the Avantgarde kolhoz, it now consists of the Pyschevyk and Chernenko settlements.
- Prymors'ke (Ukrainian: Приморське; Russian: Приморское) is a village (selo) with a population of 1,495. It used to be known as the Prymors'kyi kolhoz. The village now consists of the Naverezhne, Sosnovs'ke, Pervomais'ke and Ukrains'ke settlements.
- Samilove (Ukrainian: Самійлове; Russian: Самойлово) is a village (selo) with a population of 536. Formerly known as the Mayak kolhoz, the village now consists of the Klynykyno, Vanuashkyno, Kovs'ke, Kuznetsy, Markyno, Peremozhne and Scherbak settlements.
- Khomutove (Ukrainian: Хомутове; Russian: Хомутово) is a village (selo) with a population of 760. It was known as the kolhoz by the name of Lenin. The village now consists of the following settlements: Bessarabka, Vytava, Rozy Liuksemburh and Sedogo-Vasyl'evla.
- Shyrokyne (Ukrainian: Широкине; Russian: Широкино) is a settlement with a population of 1,347. Formerly known as the kolhoz by the name of 21st Convention of the CPSU, the settlement now consists of the following settlements: Berdians'ke, Lebedyns'ke, Sakhanka and Sopyno.

== See also ==
- Administrative divisions of Donetsk Oblast
