= Sakhanka =

Sakhanka Саханка
- Village
- Interactive map of Sakhanka
- Location of Sakhanka within Ukraine Sakhanka (Ukraine)
- Coordinates: 47°7′44″N 37°51′17″E
- Country: Ukraine
- Oblast: Donetsk Oblast
- Raion: Kalmiuske Raion
- Hromada: Novoazovsk urban hromada
- Elevation: 46 m (151 ft)

Population (2001 census)
  - Total: 1,086
- Time zone: UTC+2 (EET)
  - Summer (DST): UTC+3 (EEST)
- Postal code: 87651
- Area code: +380 6296

Sakhanka (Ukrainian: Саханка; Russian: Саханка) is a village in Kalmiuske Raion (district) in Donetsk Oblast of eastern Ukraine, at 126 km south from the centre of Donetsk city; the SE part of the village borders with the Sea of Azov.

During the war in Donbas pro-Russian forces took the settlement under their control. In August 2021, it was one of the sites of the Sakhanka and Uzhivka killings.

== Demographics ==
Native language as of the Ukrainian Census of 2001:

- Ukrainian: 58.28%
- Russian: 41.54%
- Armenian: 0.09%
- Greek (including Mariupol Greek and Urum): 0.09%
