= Novoazovsk =

City in Donetsk Oblast, Ukraine

Novoazovsk: Новоазовськ (Ukrainian); Новоазовск (Russian)
- City
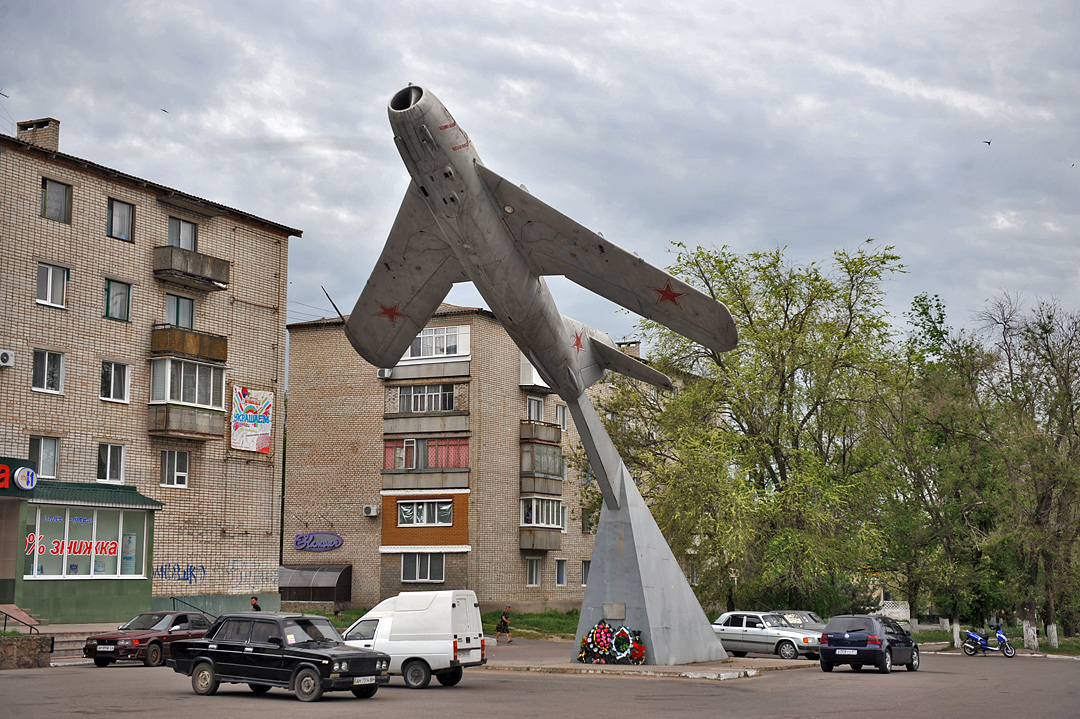
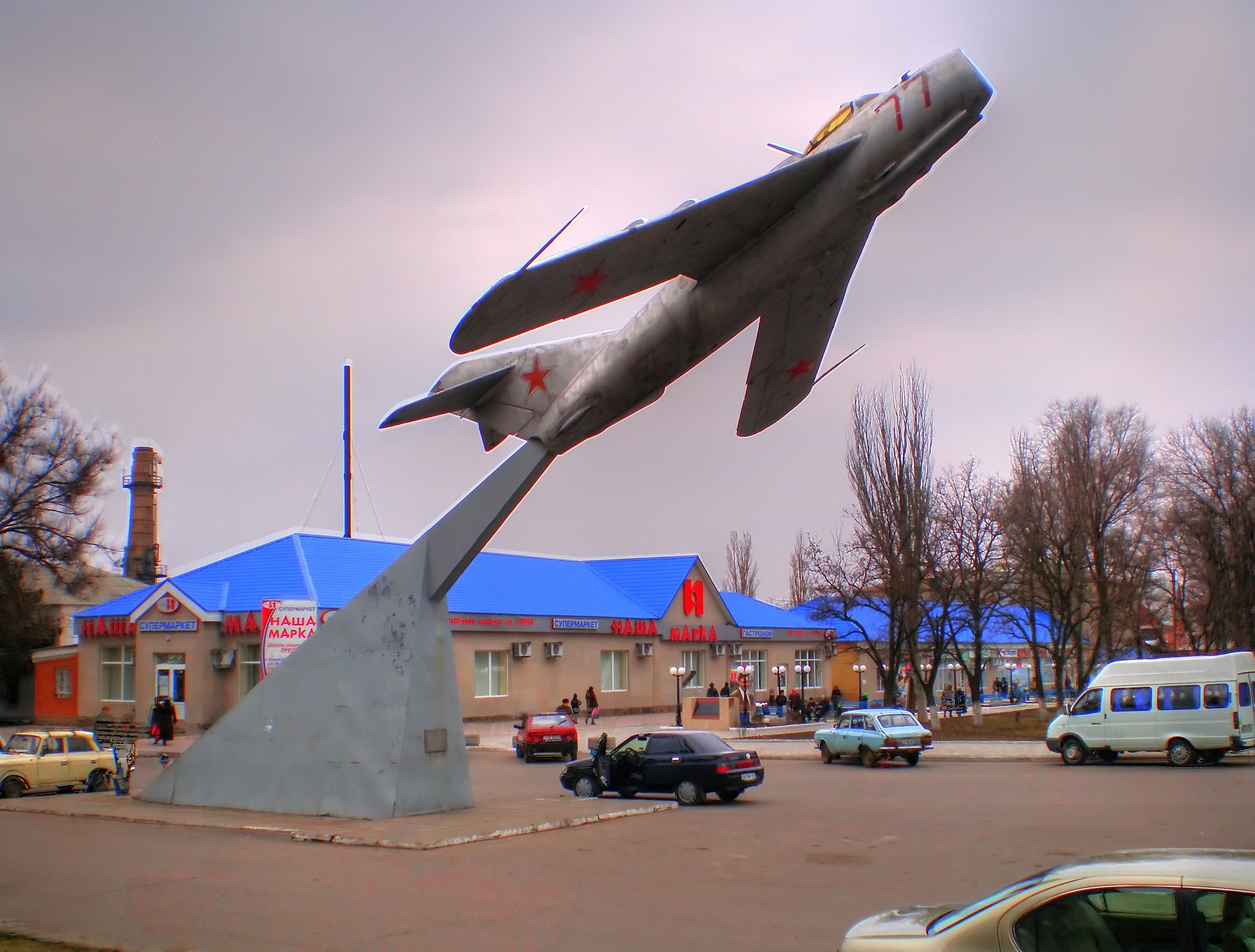
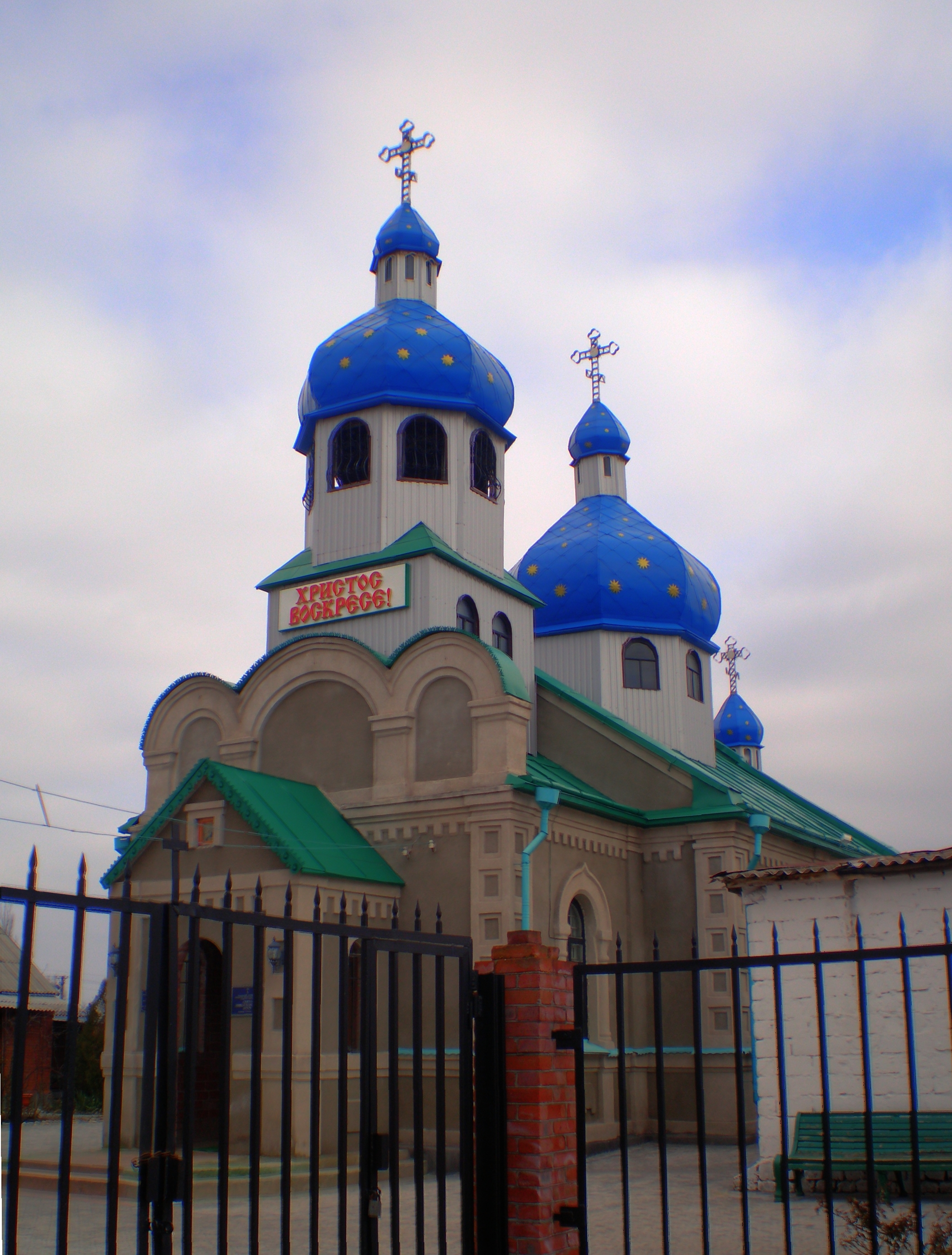
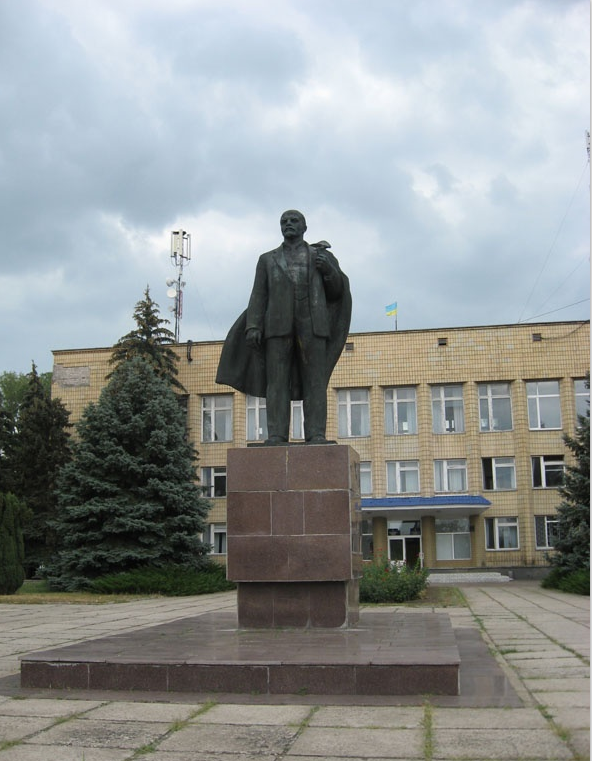
- Main square of Novoazovsk The Mig-17 monument Church of St. Nicholas Monument to Vladimir Lenin
- Interactive map of Novoazovsk
- Location of Novoazovsk Novoazovsk (Ukraine)
- Coordinates: 47°6′53″N 38°4′48″E
- Country: Ukraine
- Oblast: Donetsk Oblast
- Raion: Kalmiuske Raion
- Hromada: Novoazovsk urban hromada
- Established: 1849

Government
  - Mayor: Oleh Sidorenko

Area
  - Total: 8 km^{2} (3.1 sq mi)
- Elevation: 21 m (69 ft)

Population (2022)
  - Total: 11,051
  - Density: 1,400/km^{2} (3,600/sq mi)
- Postal code: 87600 - 87605
- Climate: Dfa

Novoazovsk (Ukrainian: Новоазовськ, pronounced [nowoɐˈzɔu̯sʲk]; Russian: Новоазовск, pronounced [nəvəɐˈzofsk]) is a border city on the south-eastern tip of Ukraine (near the border with Russia), in Kalmiuske Raion, in Donetsk Oblast. Since 2014, it has been occupied by the Donetsk People's Republic and then Russia.

Novoazovsk and adjacent areas are the only places in Ukraine where the great black-headed gull (Larus ichthyaetus) lives.

== Etymology ==
- 1849–1923 Novonikolayevska (Novomykolaivska)
- 1923–1959 Budyonivka (Budionnivka)
- 1959–present Novoazovsk

== History ==
It was administratively part of the Donets Governorate of Ukraine from 1920 to 1925.

Beginning in mid-April 2014 pro-Russian separatists captured several towns in Donetsk Oblast; including Novoazovsk. In June 2014 Ukrainian forces reportedly secured the city from the separatists. The situation around the town then became relatively quiet. On 25 August 2014, Ukraine claimed that Russian soldiers disguised as separatists had opened a new front in the War in Donbass with an offensive against Mariupol. Ukraine claimed it had blocked this offensive near Novoazovsk. Fighting in the area continued on 26 August 2014. According to a Ukrainian Dnipro Battalion commander, Novoazovsk was overrun by Russian tanks and fell to the Russians on 27 August. This claim was confirmed by Ukrainian authorities the next day. On the other hand, separatist leaders on the same day claimed that the town was taken by separatist forces as part of an offensive against Mariupol.

== Gallery ==
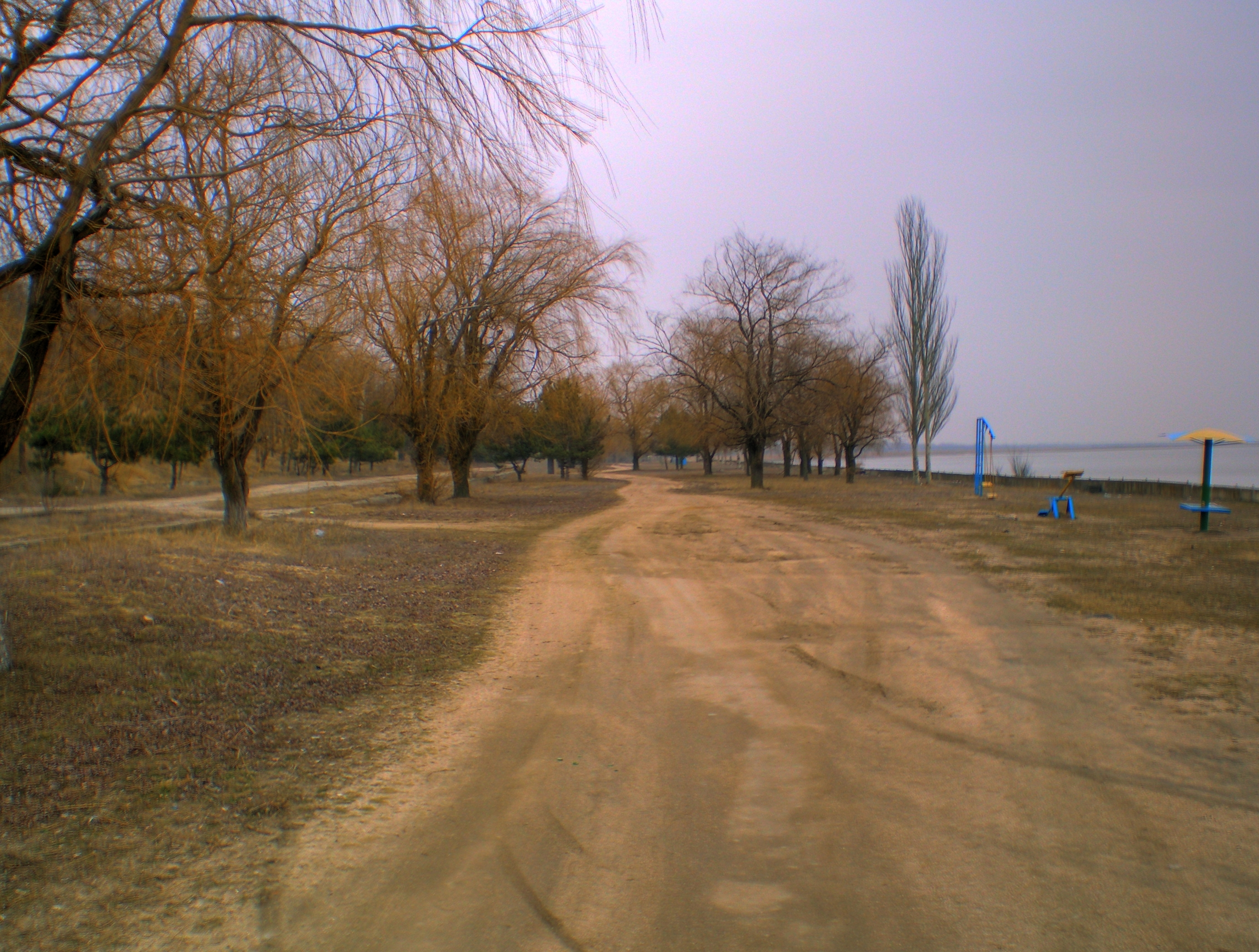
Beach in Novoazovsk

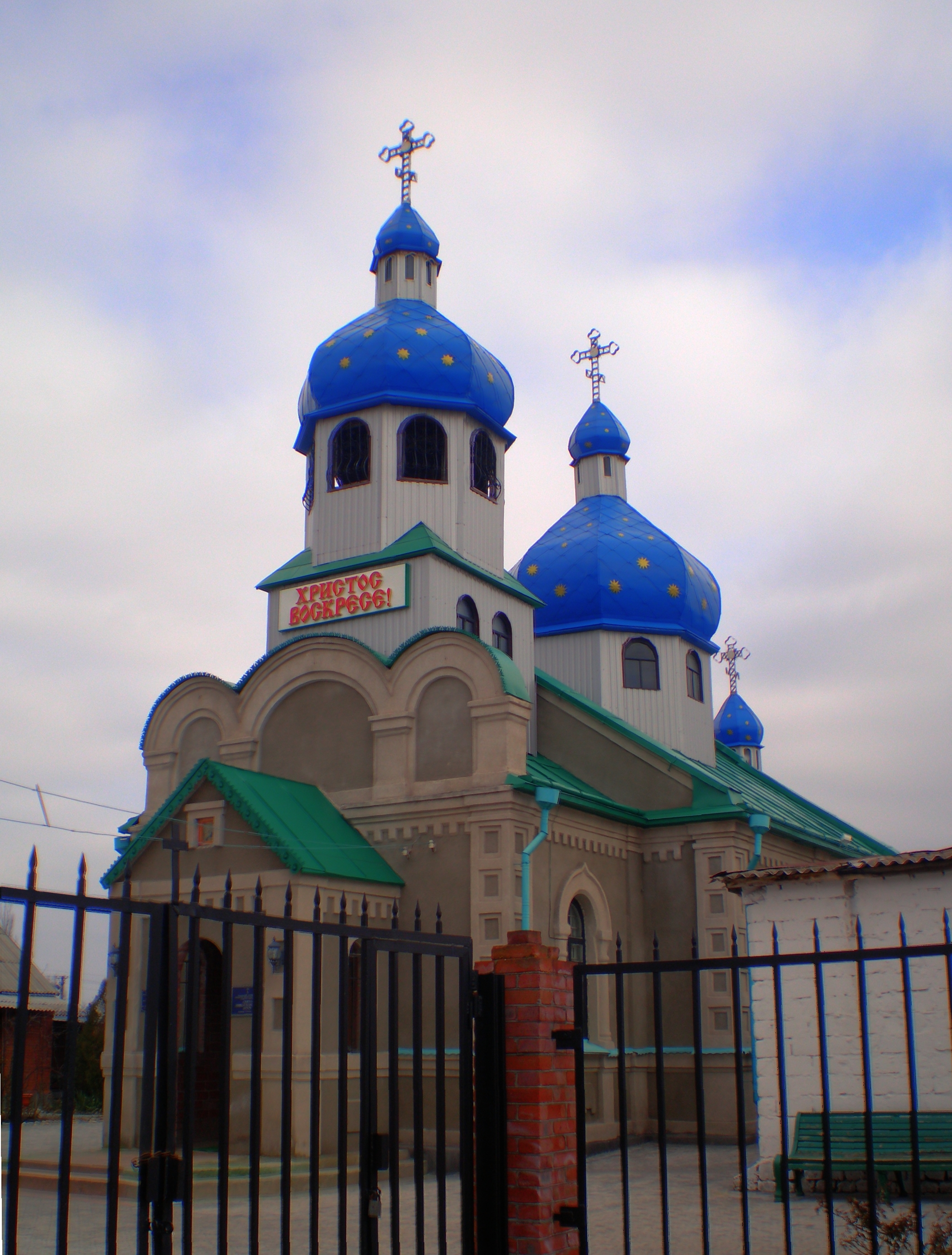
St Nicholas Church

== Geography ==
=== Climate ===
The climate in Novoazovsk is a hot/warm summer subtype (Köppen: Dfa) of the humid continental climate.

Climate data for Novoazovsk
Month	Jan	Feb	Mar	Apr	May	Jun	Jul	Aug	Sep	Oct	Nov	Dec	Year
Mean daily maximum °C (°F)	0 (32)	1 (34)	6 (43)	13 (55)	20 (68)	25 (77)	28 (82)	27 (81)	21 (70)	14 (57)	6 (43)	1 (34)	28 (82)
Mean daily minimum °C (°F)	−5 (23)	−5 (23)	0 (32)	6 (43)	12 (54)	16 (61)	18 (64)	18 (64)	12 (54)	7 (45)	1 (34)	−4 (25)	−5 (23)
Average precipitation mm (inches)	41.1 (1.62)	38.9 (1.53)	42.1 (1.66)	49.1 (1.93)	33.8 (1.33)	59.2 (2.33)	40.0 (1.57)	34.5 (1.36)	51.6 (2.03)	35.0 (1.38)	54.7 (2.15)	52.3 (2.06)	532.3 (20.96)
Average precipitation days	15	13	14	12	10	11	8	7	10	10	14	14	138
Source: World Weather Online

== Demographics ==
As of the Ukrainian national census in 2001, Novoazovsk had a population of 12,723 people. The majority of the population is ethnically Ukrainian, yet Russian is the most common language in the city. The exact ethnic and linguistic composition was as follows:

Ethnic groups in Novoazovsk
	percent
Ukrainians	58.00%
Russians	38.87%
Greeks	1.02%
Belarusians	0.55%
Tatars	0.17%
Georgians	0.15%
Armenians	0.09%
Moldovans	0.08%

Native languages in Novoazovsk
	percent
Russian	76.4%
Ukrainian	22.9%
Belarusian	0.1%
others	0.3%

Currently, population of the city was estimated to 11,051 (2022 estimate) inhabitants.

== Notable people ==
- Boris Khreschatitsky (1881–1940), Russian general
