= MT-LBu =

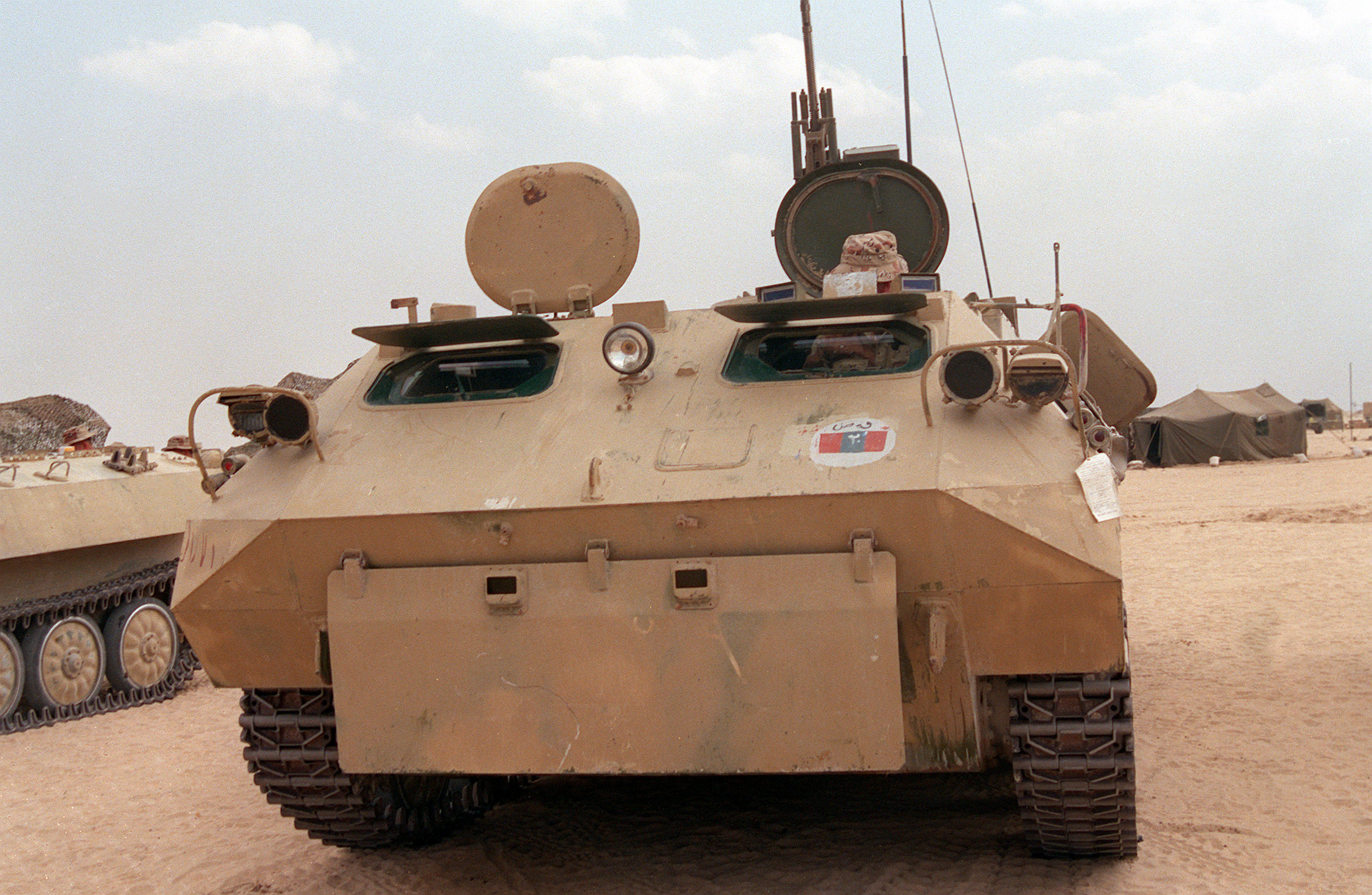
- An Iraqi MT-LBu captured by the Coalition Forces during Operation Desert Storm.
- Type: Armored transporter
- Place of origin: Soviet Union

Production history
- Manufacturer: Kharkiv Tractor Plant

Specifications
- Mass: 15,550 kg
- Length: 7.21 m
- Width: 2.85 m
- Height: 1.905 m
- Crew: 2 (+ 6 passengers)
- Armor: Welded aluminum
- Engine: YaMZ-238N, V-8 diesel 300 hp at 2,100 rpm
- Suspension: Torsion bar
- Operational range: 500 km (road range)
- Maximum speed: 61.5 km/h (road); 30 km/h (off-road); 5 to 6 km/h (in the water)

The MT-LBu is a Soviet multi-purpose fully amphibious armoured carrier which was developed under the factory index Ob'yekt 10 in the late 1960s, based on the MT-LB. It has a more powerful engine, a 40 cm higher hull and a longer chassis with 7 road wheels on each side.

== Development ==
In the 1970s the Soviet Central Auto and Tractor Directorate embarked on a development program to replace the AT-P series of artillery tractors that were based on the ASU-57, with a new generation of vehicles. The MT-L was developed to meet this requirement based on the PT-76 chassis. The MT-LB is the armoured variant of the vehicle.

Entering production in the early 1970s, it was cheap to build, being based on many existing components including the engine, which is a truck engine. The MT-LBu is a bigger, unarmed version that is used as the basis for many specialised vehicles. It was built at the Kharkiv Tractor Plant (KhTZ) in the Ukrainian SSR as well as Poland (Stalowa Wola) and Bulgaria (Beta JSCo.).

== Description ==
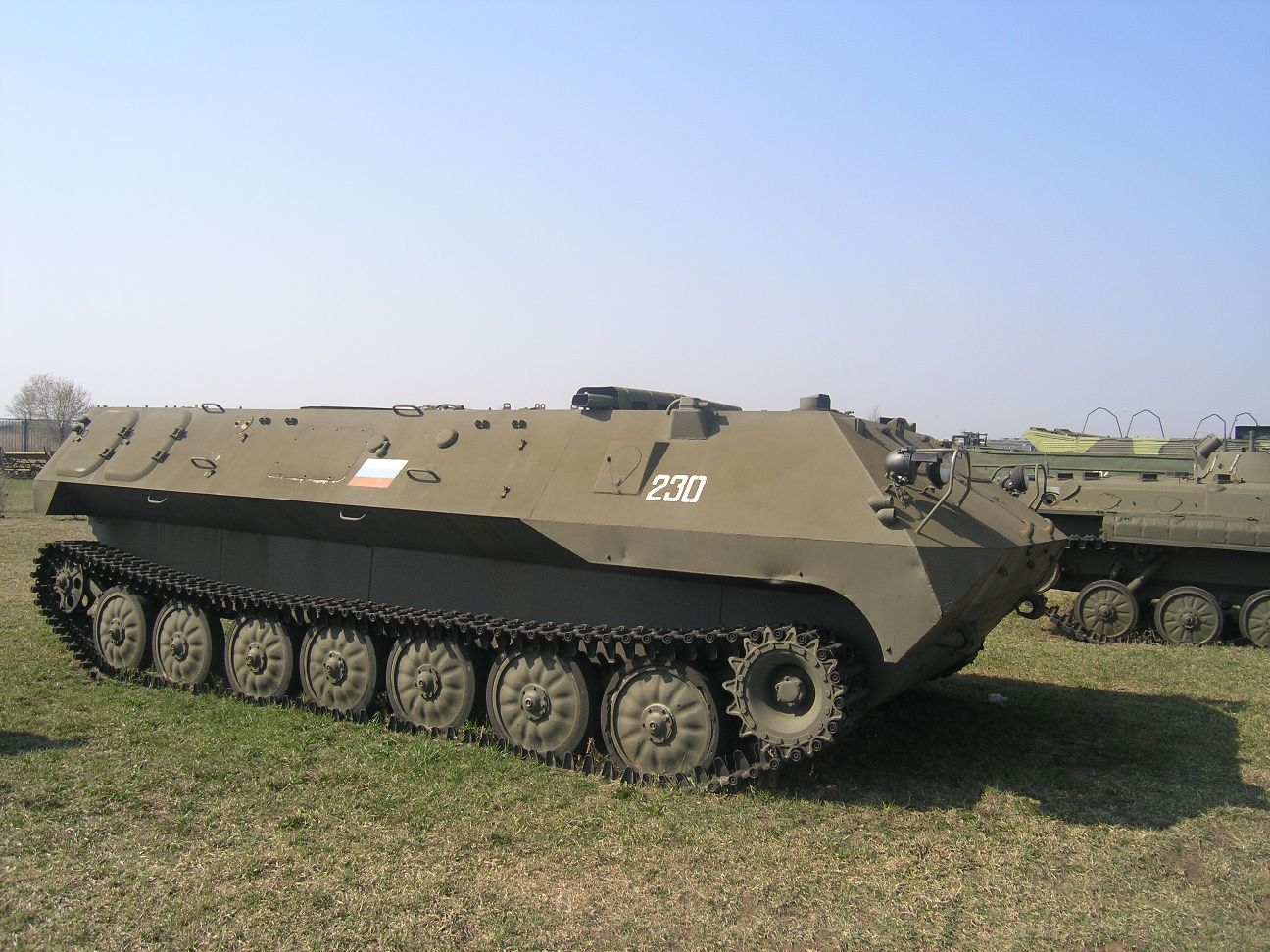
MT-LBu profile

The crew—a driver and a commander—is located in a compartment at the front of the vehicle, with the engine behind them. The compartment at the rear has a volume of 13 m^{3}. A load of 6,500 kg can be towed. The vehicle is fully amphibious, being propelled in the water by its tracks.

The vehicle is lightly armored against small arms and shell fragments with a thickness of 3 to 10 mm steel. The troop compartment has one roof hatch over the top, which opens rearwards. In the centre of the roof, there is a big circular opening that is covered with a blanking plate with a hatch when no turret is mounted. The MT-LBu has 2 firing ports: one on the front right side and the other on the rear door, both with an associated vision device.

The driver is provided with a TVN-2 infra-red periscope, which in combination with the OU-3GK infra-red/white light search light provides a range of about 40 m. The MT-LBu is equipped with an NBC detection device GO-27, a filter system FVU and a navigation apparatus.

=== SIGINT "Taran" ===
At the 2022 Russian Invasion of Ukraine the MT-Lbu variant R-381T "Taran" got more in focus. The System is used at divisional level and consists of 7 vehicles. The recent R-381TM Taran-M is an upgrade of R-381T Taran from the Cold War-era.The system is used to monitor radio signals, eavesdropping on enemy forces’ communications across a wide range of frequencies. As well as providing raw intelligence in the form of intercepted communications, the Taran is able to geolocate transmitters, providing commanders with critical data on the actual positions of enemy forces.

The kompleks radiotekhnicheskoj razvedki System (‘automatic radio intelligence complex) replaced the R-381 "Rama" set on GAZ-66 truck. In Ukraine the newer version R-381TM Taran-M is used. About the "original R-381T Taran" is known, that the system, when deployed at full strength, consists of seven vehicles.

- R-381T1 "Taran 1" – interceptor station (×2);
- R-381T2 "Taran 2" – direction finding station (×4);
- R-381T3 "Taran 3" – control vehicle for the T1 and T2 (×1)

The R-381T Taran complex can be set up to comprise five vehicles: two R-381T2s, two R-381T1s, and a single R-381T3. The Taran 2 gathers signals at four R-381T2 UHF radio monitoring stations that operate in the 30 to 100 MHz band, and two R-381T1 VHF radio monitoring stations operating across 1.5 to 30 MHz, and which are able to listen in on aviation airband communication (100 to 400 MHz), as well as radio relay links (300 to 1000 MHz). Data acquired by these systems based on vehicles is then processed by a single R-381T3 vehicle. Ukrainian sources report, that the R-381T Taran can detect, classify and listen in on radio emissions at a range of 40 kilometres (25 mi) on land and at a range of up to 97 kilometres (60 mi) when monitoring airband communications.

== Variants ==
=== Former USSR (Russian Federation and Ukraine) ===
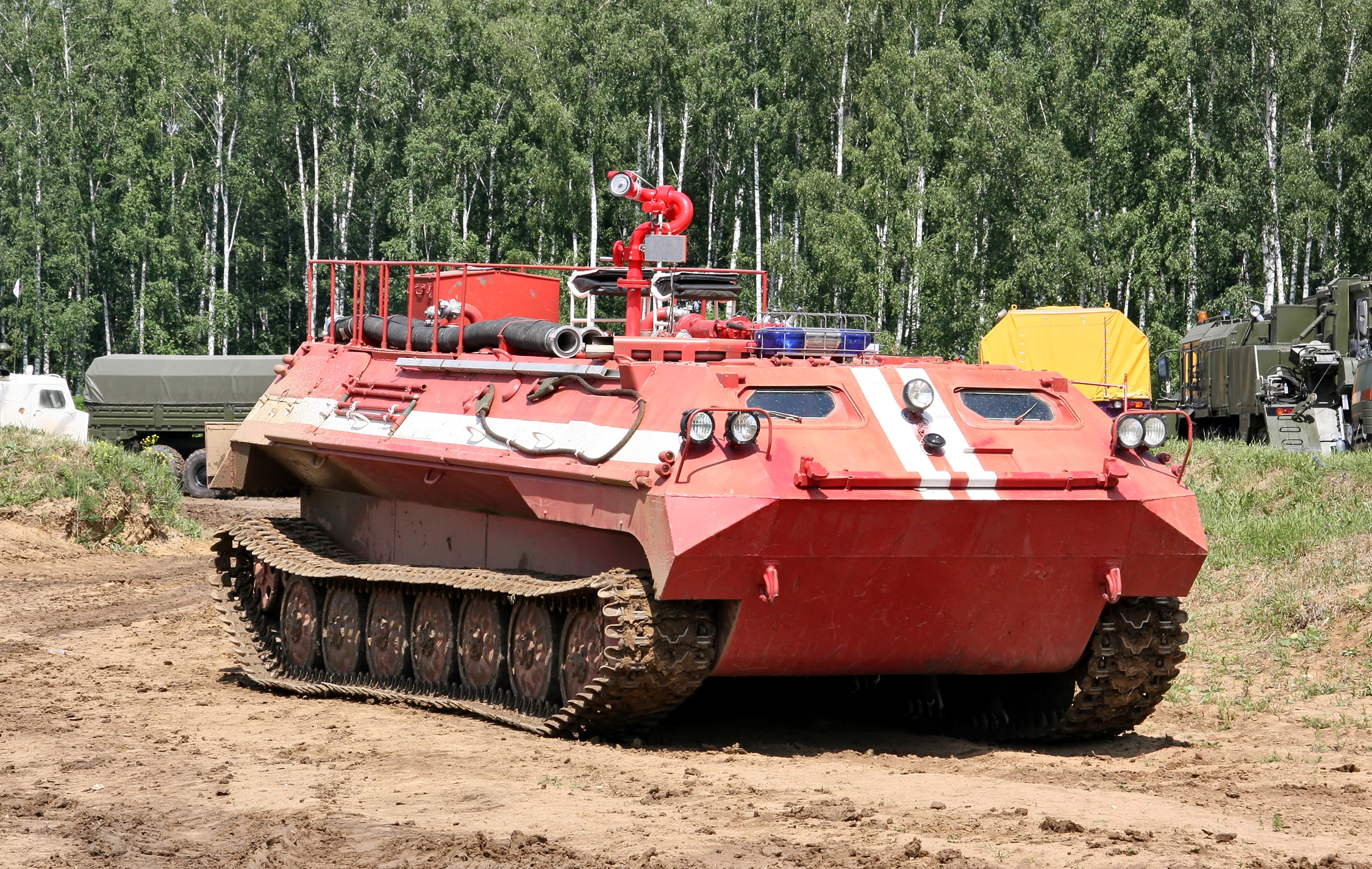
A firefighting MT-LBu-GPM-10.

- MT-LBu – basic version. Many so-called "MT-LB variants" are in fact based on the MT-LBu.
  - 1L219 "Zoopark-1" – radar vehicle of the target locating and fire control system 1L219.
    - 1L219M "Zoopark-1M" – modernised version, presented in 2002.
  - 1L245 – ground-based weapons control radar suppression system with a 1 kW output.
  - 1RL243 "Rubicon" MASRR (mobilnaya avtomatizirovannaya stantsiya radiotekhnicheskoy razvedki) – mobile automated SHF radio monitoring station.
  - 1S80 "Sborka" PPRU (podvizhnyj punkt razvedki i upravleniya) – G-band early warning radar for air defence units with a max. range of 80 km. Known in NATO as DOG EAR. Modified versions include the PPRU-M, the PPRU-M1 and the PPRU-M1-2 that was presented in 2007.
  - 1V12 "Mashina" KSAUO – this fire control set (kompleks sredstv avtomatizirovannogo upravleniya ognyom/Комплекс средств автоматизированного управления огнем) entered service in 1974 and consists of 8 vehicles in 4 different models. Several upgrades have been developed, including the 1V12-3 "Mashina-M", the 1V12M "Faltset", the 1V12M-1 and the 1V12M-2. This set is found in artillery units equipped with self-propelled howitzers like the 2S1, 2S3, 2S5 and 2S19.
    - 1V13 – battery fire control center, three per set. The 1V13 has a crew of 6 and is equipped with a PAB-2AM aiming circle, range finders, an automatic data processing system APK or APPK, three radio sets R-123M (or R-173) and an observation device PV-1 on top of the turret. Early models were armed with the DShK-M, later vehicles have the NSVT and a generator GIV-8/8000 on the right rear. Former NATO designator: ACRV M1974/1.
    - 1V14 – battery command and forward observer vehicle, three per set. This type can be identified by the observation systems VOP-7A, 1PN44 and DAK-2M mounted on the turret top and right side. Radio sets as per 1V13 plus one R-107. Crew: 5, armament: one PKMB 7.62 mm. Former NATO designator: ACRV M1974/2a.
    - 1V15 – very similar to 1V14 but fitted with a slim antenna mast for the R-130M radio. One of the R-123M's has been replaced by an R-111. This is the battalion commander's vehicle. Former NATO designator: ACRV M1974/2b.
    - 1V16 – battalion fire direction center with 9V59 computer and meteo set MDK7. Armament as per 1V13, radio sets as per 1V15 plus one R-326. Crew: 6-7. Former NATO designator: ACRV M1974/3. The model with generator has no turret.
  - 9S714-N-18
  - 9V514 "Beta-3" – divisional computer vehicle, belongs to the PASUV set. The specialised equipment consists of an Argon-40 computer and the T-244 data processing unit. Produced from 1980 to 1990.
  - ARK-1 (artilleriskiy radiolokatsionnyi kompleks) – mobile H-band artillery locating radar 1RL-239 with a detection range of 15 km (howitzers) to 40 km (tactical missiles). Usually found in the division's recce battery.
    - ARK-1M – improved model with generator.
  - I-52 – mine scattering vehicle, developed in the 1990s by KVSZ from Ukraine. On the vehicle's roof are two mine dispensers with 90 cassettes each for anti-tank and anti-personnel mines PFM-1, PMF-1S, KSO-1, POM-1 or POM-2, GTM-1 and/or PTM-3.
  - KDKhR-1N "Dal" (kompleks nazemnoy distantsionnoy khimicheskoy razvedki) – long-range chemical detection system that works with lasers with a detection range between 1,000 and 7,000 meter. The other specialised equipment consists of the TNA-4-6 navigation apparatus, a computer, a data processing unit, the PRKhR detection system, an automatic gas detection device GSA-12, PGO-11 gas indicator, KPO-1 sampling set and the "Karat" TV system.
  - LKM3 or P-256B – cable laying version.
  - MP21-25 – vehicles that belong to the automated field command set PASUV "Manyevr" that was developed in 1972. Vehicles of the PASUV-R set (from 1984) are equipped with the data processing unit "Redut-2P" and have the suffix R in their designator. All models are equipped with an 8 kW generator, an antenna mast AMU and several movable wip antennas.
    - MP21 (9S743) – for the division commander and his staff (MP21M), the NBC defence section (MP21M-2) and the intelligence cell (MP21M-3).
    - MP22 (9S716) – version for the commander of the air-defence forces.
    - MP23 (9Sxxx) – version for the air-force liaison group with R-809M2 radio set for ground-air communications.
    - MP24 (9S775) – for the commander of the field artillery and rocket forces (MP24M), the chief-of-staff of the artillery regiments (MP24M-1) and the divisional artillery group (MP24M-2). Fitted with a DAK-2 range finder and the 1V57M artillery computer.
    - MP25 (9S717) – version for processing of radar data.
  - MP22-1 "Ranzhir" (9S737) – mobile command post for 9K331 "Tor" (SA-15) batteries with a crew of 5. The vehicle is standard equipped with the following systems: navigation apparatus TNA-4-4, computer E715-1-1, a sight VOP-7A, generators 137N and 134N, a data processing set T-235-1L, one radio set R-134, two R-171M, two R-173M, three R-173PM, one R-862, a single blade antenna (for R-862) and a slim 10 m mast.
  - MP95 "Beta-4" – divisional computer vehicle of the PASUV-R set, fitted with an Argon-50 computer.
  - MZS-83 (moshchnaya zvukoveshchatel’naya stantsiya) – PsyOps vehicle with high-power loudspeaker system.
  - PPRI-5 – division-level signals vehicle.
  - R-149BMRg – signals vehicle, fitted with two R-171M radio sets, an R-163-50U, an R-163-10V, an R-134M, R-438, R-853 and R-012M, devices T-230-1A, T-240D and T-235-1U and a telephone set TA-2.
  - R-161B – HF/VHF signals vehicle fitted with the R-161 set with an output of 1 kW and with a range of 2,000 km.
    - R-161BM – modernised model with two R-161-10 sets.
  - R-330B – EW vehicle, fitted with automated jammer system. The unarmoured, truck-based version is called R-330T.
  - R-330KB – mobile automated command post for systems R-330B and R-378B.
  - R-330P "Piramida-I" – EW vehicle, fitted with a VHF jammer system with an output between 20 and 100 MHz and with a range of 25 km.
  - R-378B – EW vehicle, fitted with the automated HF jammer system ASP R-378 with an output of 1,000 W and a range of 50 km.
  - R-381T "Taran" – divisional Sigint set (kompleks radiotekhnicheskoj razvedki) that replaced the R-381 "Rama" set on GAZ-66 truck. A complete set normally consists of 7 vehicles in three different models:
    - R-381T1 "Taran 1" – interceptor station (×2);
    - R-381T2 "Taran 2" – direction finding station (×4);
    - R-381T3 "Taran 3" – control vehicle for the T1 and T2 (×1).
  - R-412B – divisional tropospheric relay station, fitted with two parabolic antennas R-133 and a generator GAB-8-T/230.
  - R-439BG "Legenda-2BG" – mobile SatCom station.
  - R-934B – EW vehicle, fitted with an automated system to jam aircraft VHF/UHF communications.
  - TGM (transportnaya gusenichnaya mashina) – civilianised transporter.
- 2S1 122 mm self-propelled howitzer.
- 2S34 120 mm self-propelled gun-mortar.

=== Belarus ===
Based on older versions – mostly of the 1V12 series – Minotaur from Belarus has developed new versions of the MT-LBu:

- TMPK "Mul" (transportnaya mashina perednego kraya) – forward area re-supply vehicle.
- TZM122 (transportno-zaryazhayushaya mashina) – ammunition re-supply vehicle for field artillery units, equipped with the 2S1.
- SM120 (samokhonyj minomyot) – mortar platform with 2B11 "Sani" 120 mm mortar and one basic load of 48 rounds.
- PPMP (podvizhnyj punkt meditsinkogo pomoshchi) – ambulance.

=== Bulgaria ===
- KShM 9S743 – command and staff vehicle, initially very similar to the Soviet MP24 but has been upgraded in the year 2000 with new communications gear. In service.
- Iskra
- MTP-1 – combat engineer vehicle, equipped with a big dozer blade at the rear, a roof-mounted crane with a capacity of 3,000 kg and a machine-gun turret TKB-01 in the front right corner (as per MT-LB). Combat weight is 14 t. Prototype.
- KShTMS – command and control vehicle, fitted with automated equipment.
- KShM-R-55 – command vehicle, fitted with the communications set R-55B. This consists of the HF radio R-55R, the receiver R-55P, the VHF radio R-33 and the receiver R-23.
- MSP-1
- MSP-2

=== Finland ===
- MT-LBu-TP (tulipatterin komentopaikkapanssarivaunu) – battery command post. This is a modified 1V13, fitted with an NSVT-12.7 machine gun, 76 mm Wegmann smoke grenade launchers, stowage boxes and a generator. Crew: 8. The first three prototypes were developed by Vammas in 1993, the rest of the fleet was modified between 1995 and 1997.
- MT-LBu-P (paikantamispanssarivaunu) – modified 1V14/15, used as navigation vehicle for survey and preparation of firing positions. External modifications as per MT-LBu-TP but armed with PKM machine gun.
- MT-LBu-PS (patteriston komentopaikkapanssarivaunu) – modified 1V16, used as battalion command post. Externally very similar to MT-LBu-TP.

=== Hungary ===
- MFAJ (müszaki felderitö akadály-elháritó jármü) – transport vehicle for combat engineer squads.

=== Poland ===
Polish HSW S.A. (Huta Stalowa Wola S.A.) has a license to produce MT-LBu.

- ZWDSz 1 (zautomatyzowany wóz dowódczo sztabowy) – command vehicle of the automated command set "Irys". Entered service in 2002 and is based on an MP-21-25.

=== Sweden ===
- Pbv 4020 (pansarbandvagn) – Swedish designator for basic chassis (former 1V12 series, modified).
- Stripbv 4021 (stridsledningbandvagn) – command vehicle, fitted with three radio sets Ra 180, one Ra 195, one Ra 422 and a switch board.
- Sjvpbv 4024 (sjukvårdspansarbandvagn) – ambulance with room for 4 stretchers.

== Operators ==
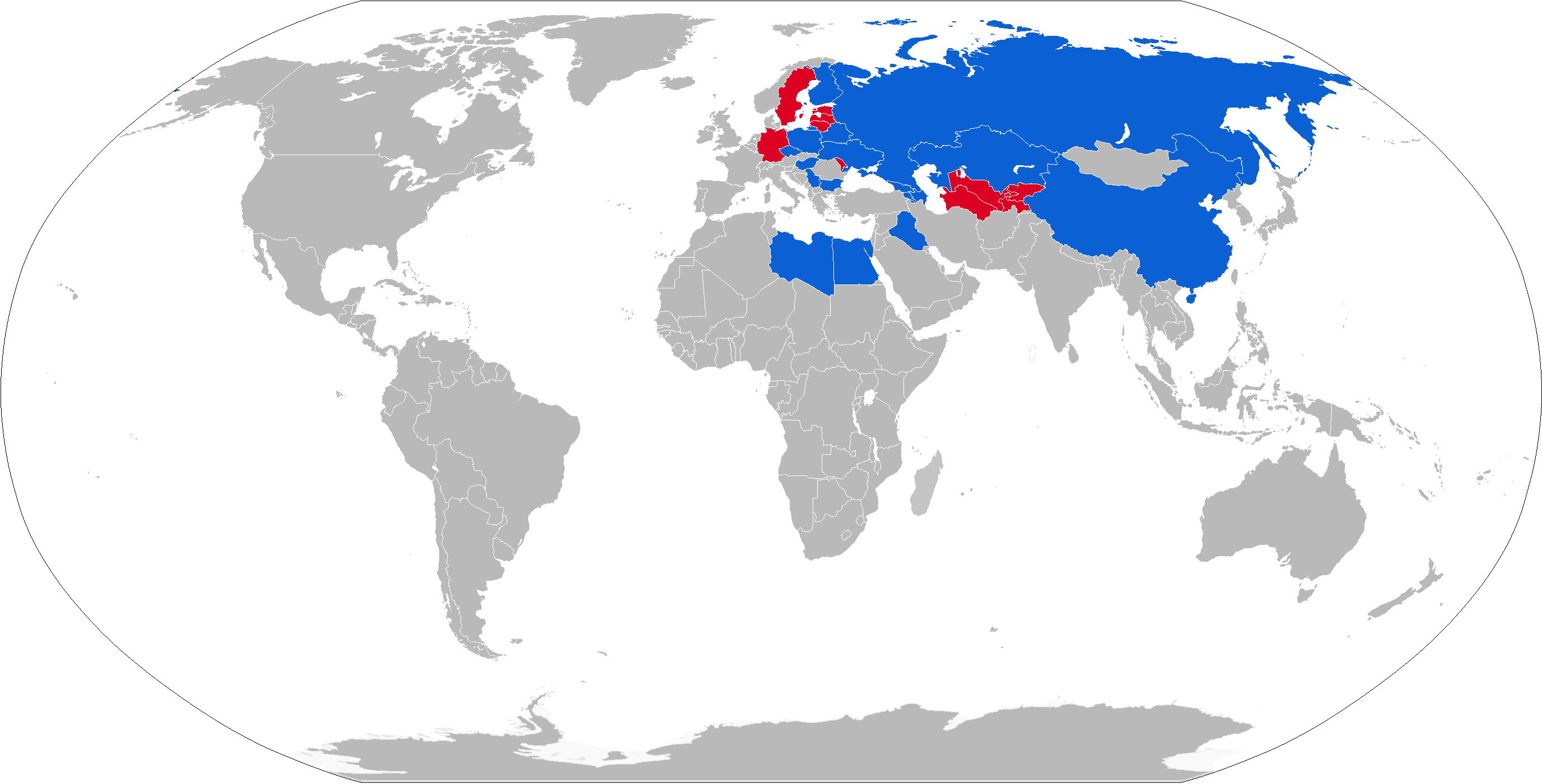
A map of MT-LBu operators in blue and former operators in red

=== Current operators ===
- Armenia
- Azerbaijan
- Belarus
- Bulgaria
- China
- Czech Republic
- Egypt
- Finland – Artillery command vehicles, ambulances and signals vehicles
- Georgia
- Hungary – 21 MFAJ
- Iraq
- Kazakhstan
- Libya – At least 1 heavily up-armored example currently in use by Misratan militias.
- Poland
- Russia
- Serbia
- Ukraine
- Venezuela

=== Former operators ===
- East Germany – 17 sets 1V12 (136 vehicles), 1 set PASUV (18 vehicles), 1 set R-381T "Taran" (5 vehicles) and R-330P. Passed on to Germany after the German reunification.
- Germany – All sold, scrapped and returned to the Soviet Union briefly after the German reunification.
- Soviet Union – Passed on to successor states.
- Sweden – 38 Pbv 4020, 12 Stripbv 4021 and 10 Sjvpbv 4024.

== See also ==
- List of AFVs
