= VSM-1 mine system =

Soviet helicopter minelaying system

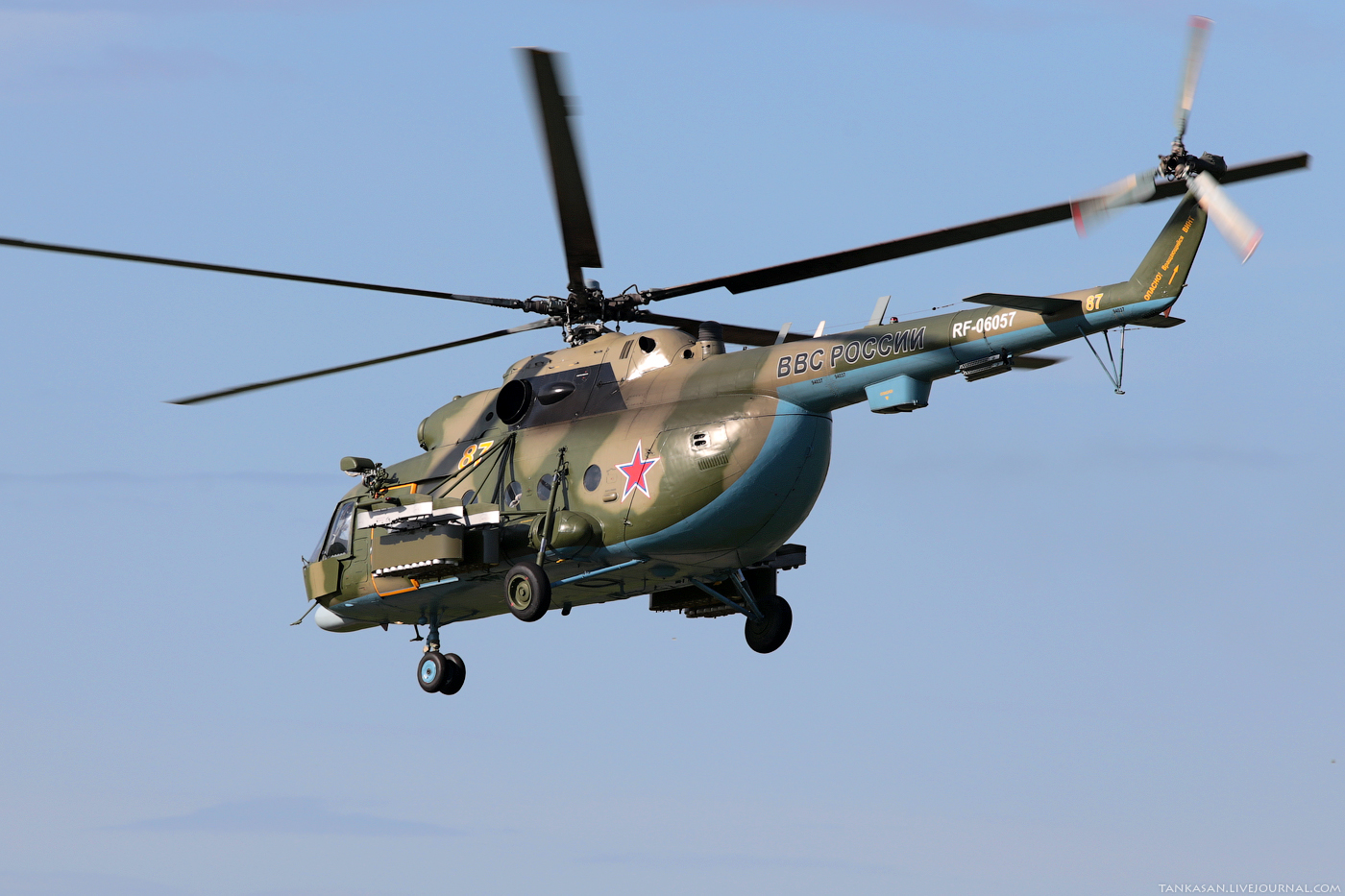
A Mi-8MT helicopter with a VSM-1 minelaying device of the Russian Air Force.

VSM-1 (Russian: ВСМ-1—Вертолетная Система Минирования-1) is a Soviet helicopter-based remote mining system. It can be mounted on various variants of the Mil Mi-8 helicopter, particularly the Mi-8T and Mi-8MT. It is capable of deploying a range of high explosive and fragmentation mines.

The system was developed by the State Research Engineering Institute (ГНИИИ) and was manufactured by the Kazan Helicopter Production Association, which was renamed to Kazan Helicopters in 1993. It is still being produced and used today by the Russian Armed Forces.

== Action ==
The VSM-1 system is made up of 4 containers, a PUM-1V (Russian: ПУМ-1В) control panel, a PKPI-1 (Russian: ПКПИ-1) control device, a PP-1V (Russian: ПП-1В) electronics test panel and a container lifting & suspension system.

Depending on the configuration, a Mi-8 equipped with VSM-1 can spray from 116 to 8352 mines in under a minute. This allows the creation of minefields with a density ranging from one mine per 5-6 square meters to several mines per meter, depending on the helicopter's altitude.

== Use ==
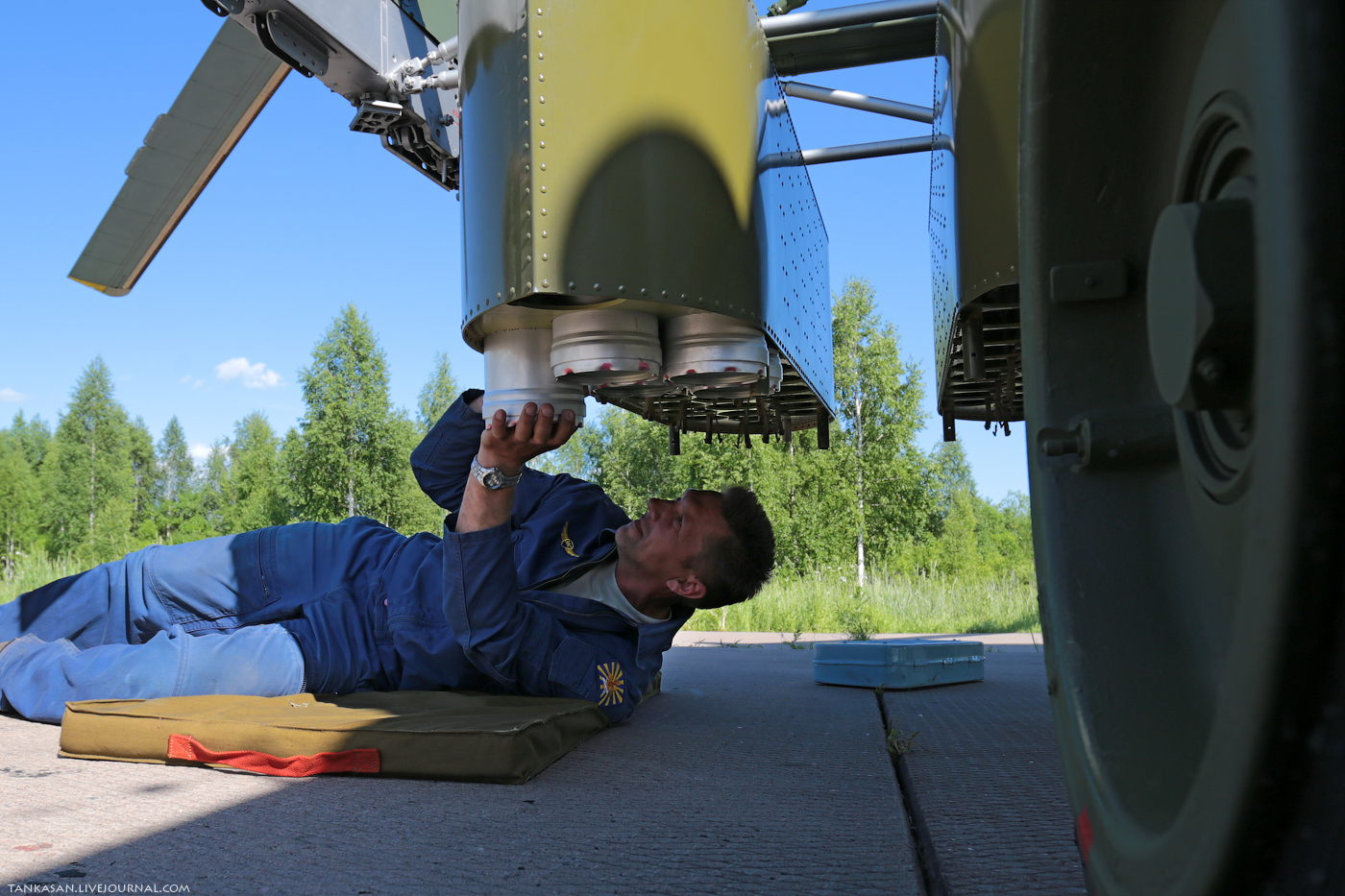
A Russian Air Force service member loading KSO-1 cassettes into the VSM-1 minelaying system.

Generally, the helicopter crew performs the mining from an altitude of 30-150 meters, at speeds of 150-220 km/h. Depending on the type of mines loaded in the system, VSM-1 allows the mining of areas of 400-2000 meters in length, with a width of 15-60 meters. The mines are commonly used in tandem with bombing runs, preventing the enemy from properly navigating the ruins, resulting in more effective mine use.

== Specifications ==
- Container size: 1884x410x630 mm
- Weight:
  - Loaded container: 347 kg (765 lb)
  - Empty container: 71 kg (157 lb)
  - Control panel: 17 kg (37 lb)

Mines utilized by VSM-1
Cassette	Mine	Number	Number in cassette
KSF-1	PFM-1	8352	72
KSF-1S	PFM-1S	7424	64
KSF-1S-0.5	PFM-1 and PFM-1S	8352 - 4176 PFM1 & 4176 PFM-1S	36 PFM-1 & 36 PFM-1S
KPTM-3	PTM-3	116	1
KSO-1	POM-1	928	8
KPOM-2	POM-2	464	4

- Minefield sizes (up to):
  - Anti-tank: 400 m (1,300 ft)
  - Anti-personnel: 4,000 m (13,000 ft)
  - Anti-amphibious: 1,500 m (4,900 ft)
- Temperature range of use: −40 to +40 °C (−40 to 104 °F)
- Average density of the minefield:
  - High explosive: 3-5 pcs/m
  - Fragmentation: 0.2-0.3 pcs/m

== Combat Use ==
The VSM-1, along with other minelaying systems like the BMR-2 (Russian: БМР-2), saw extensive use in the Soviet war in Afghanistan. As a result, more than a million mines were dispensed across the territory of Afghanistan.

=== Raid in Jalalabad ===
The mission was carried out in December 1981 and involved mining trails and passes on the border of Afghanistan with Pakistan. It was carried by two Mi-8MT helicopters of the 335th OBVP (from Rus. Otdelʹnyy Boevoy Vertolëtnyy Polk) helicopter combat regiment, escorted by two Mi-24B attack helicopters. However, the mission was led by a senior navigator of the Air Force of the 40th Army, who arrived from Kabul, and was unfamiliar with the area. He guided the helicopter's crew over the border with Pakistan and ordered the mines to be dropped there, essentially mining the territory of Pakistan. The helicopter crew realized their mistake as soon as they saw railroads, which were not present in Afghanistan at that time.

== Operators ==
- Russia

=== Former Operators ===
- Soviet Union

== See also ==
- PFM-1
- Soviet Invasion of Afghanistan
- Organization for Mine Clearance and Afghan Rehabilitation
- PMN mine
- PTM-3 mine
