= POM-2 mine =

Soviet anti-personnel fragmentation mine

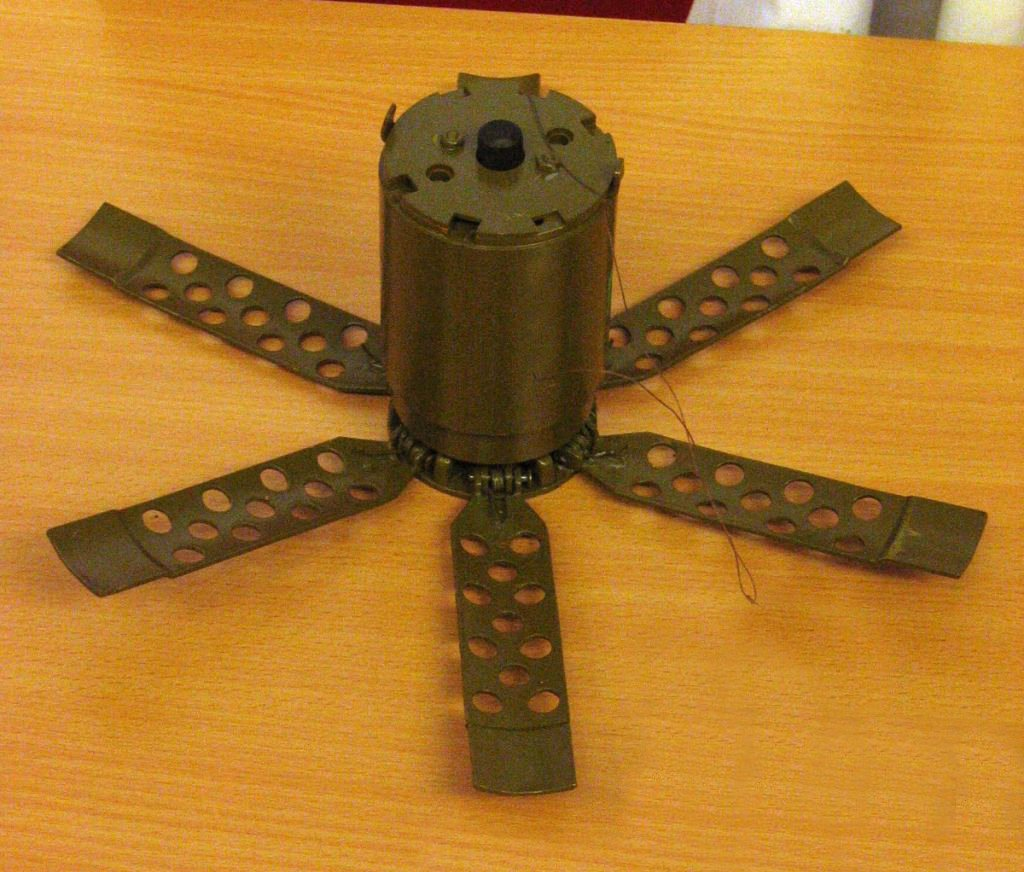
POM-2 mine

The POM-2 (Russian: Противопехотная Осколочная Мина-2, romanized: Protivopekhotnaya Oskolochnaya Mina, lit. 'Infantry Fragmentation Mine-2') is a Soviet scatterable self-liquidating fragmentation anti-personnel mine. It has a mechanical fuze with tension-type target sensors BP-09S (Russian: БП-09С).

The mine can be delivered using the BM-27 Uragan (9M59), BM-21 Grad (9M18) MLRS, helicopter-mounted minelaying system VSM-1, remote mining machine UMZ (Russian: УМЗ) or portable mining kit PKM (Russian: Переносной Комплект Минирования, romanized: Perenosnoy Komplekt Minirovaniya, lit. 'Portable Mining Kit').

In its armed position, it is presented as a steel cylinder with six spring-loaded fins at the bottom of the mine. It shoots out string that attach to nearby objects, which is used as a tripwire. The POM-2 mines must be delivered using remote mining systems, with the exception of POM-2R.

== Function ==
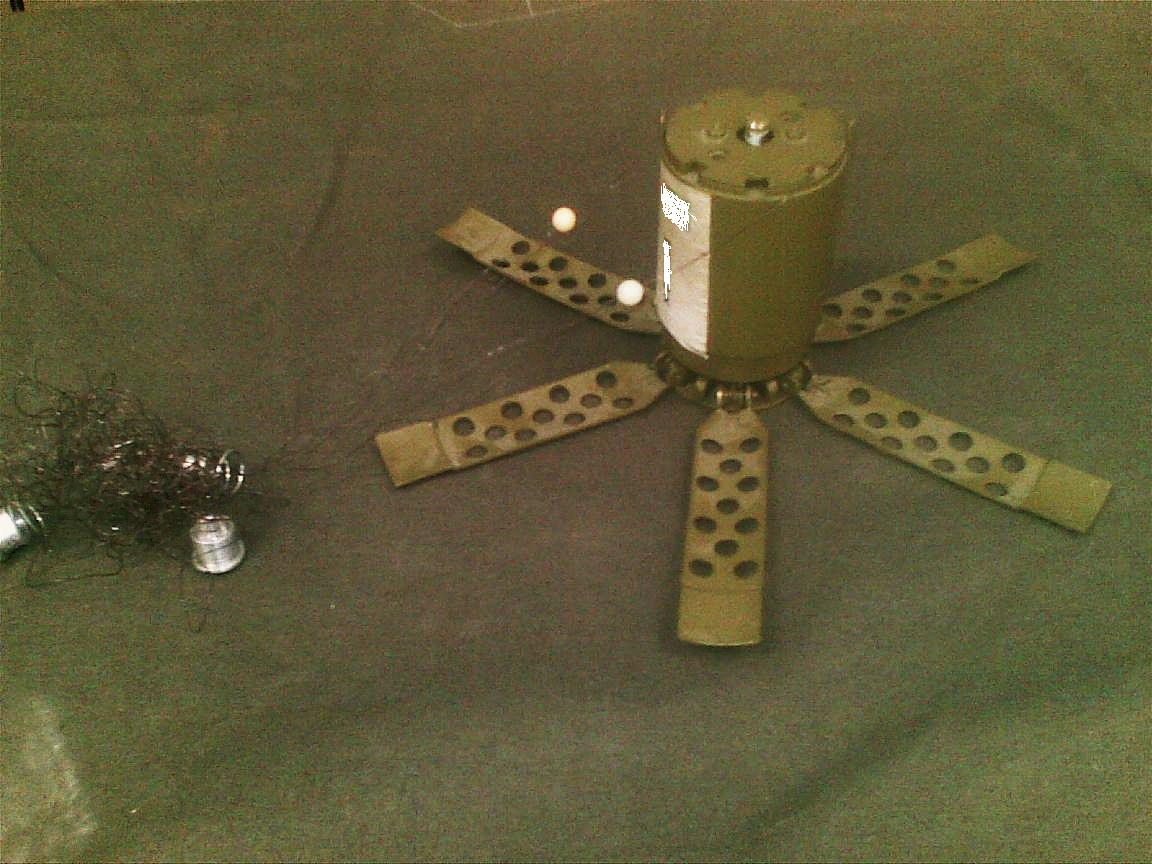
A deployed POM-2 mine.

The mine is made up of a cylindrical cast-steel cup, which contains the explosive charge. Upon detonation, the steel cylinder naturally fragments.

- Upon the ejection of four mines from the KPOM-2 cassette, a pyroshock sensor activates, which ignites the pyrotechnic retarder [1] (delay mechanism, until another stage is ready). At the same time, the caps of the stabilizing legs bounce out of the mine body, and the nylon ribbons unfold to ensure that the mine lands straight up.
- Upon the burn-up of the pyrotechnic retarder [1], the stabilizing legs are thrown out, and another set of pyrotechnic retarders is ignited [2]. [2] is a landing-delay mechanism, which gives the mine just enough time to land before starting any further processes.
- As pyrotechnic retarders [2] burn up, they activate the expelling charges which expose the spring-loaded legs that hold the body of the mine upright.
- Due to the activation of the expelling charges that released the spring-loaded legs, another set of pyrotechnic retarders [3] is activated by means of a pyroshock sensor. As [3] finishes burning, the target sensors are ejected (pyrotechnic pull cord) out of the mine, spreading the cords 10 meters apart from the mine in 4 opposite directions. Following that, a spring moves the detonator into its armed position.

At the point where the pull cords are ejected, the mechanism of self-liquidation starts working. Generally, the mine takes 50–60 seconds to deploy. Pulling on the cord with anything more than 300–400 gf (3–4 N), causes the detonator to detonate the mine, dispersing fragments semi-spherically.

== Deployment ==
Before use, the KPOM-2 cassettes are carefully checked for cracks. If any cracks deeper than 0.3 mm are present, then the cassette must be withdrawn, as it must be hermetically sealed. Faulty cassettes are destroyed with 0.2–0.4 kg of explosives.

=== UMZ ===
If the mining is performed with the usage of UMZ, then the machine must be moving at the speed in the range of 10–40 km/h. The interval between every launch is set in the control remote PUM-1V (Russian: ПУМ-1В). A full load (180 cassettes - 720 mines) can create a minefield that is 4,100–4,200 meters long and 50–60 meters wide, with a density of 0.1-0.2 mines/meter.

=== VSM-1 ===
If the mining is performed with the usage of the helicopter-mounted minelaying system VSM-1, then the machine must be moving at a speed in the range of 160–220 km/h, at an altitude of 50–100 meters, with an interval between every cassette launch being 0.8 seconds. A full load (116 cassettes - 464 mines) can create a minefield that is 4,100–4,200 meters long and 35–65 meters wide, with an average density of 0.11 mines/meter.

=== PKM ===
If the mining is performed using the portable mining kit, then it must be performed by two or more people, supported by a sapper group.

=== 9M59 rockets ===
If the mining is performed using the BM-27 Uragan MLRS, then a full salvo (16 rockets) can create a minefield consisting of 144 mines.

== Variants ==
UI-POM-2-1 (Russian: УИ-ПОМ-2-1) or UI-POM-2
Inert mine for training purposes. It contains all elements as in the POM-2, except for the detonator and detonator cap. The naming convention comes from Russian words Uchebnaya (U - Rus. Учебная) - training, and Inertnaya (I - Rus. Инертная) - inert. Utilizes the UI-KPOM-2 cassette.
UI-POM-2-2 or UI-POM-2A
Inert mine for training purposes. It is no different from the UI-POM-2-1, except that it has all the pyrotechnic elements. Utilizes the UI-KPOM-2A cassette.
UI-POM-2-3 or UI-POM-2D
Inert mine for training purposes. It contains all elements as in the POM-2, except that the explosive charge is replaced with a smoke-generating substance, the explosive cap is replaced with an igniter element, and the detonator is removed. Two holes are drilled in the frame of the mine for the escape of the smoke. Utilizes the UI-KPOM-2D cassette.
POM-2R (Russian: ПОМ-2Р)
Primarily issued to special forces. Used as a pursuit deterrent and can be delivered in the same ways as the POM-2, but can also be deployed manually without the usage of cassettes. The naming convention comes from the Russian words Ruchnaya (R - Rus. Ручная) - hand [mine]. The rocket-propelled version, with the attached motor from a PG-7 rocket, was also observed in Ukraine.

== Specifications (POM-2) ==
- Mass
  - Charge: 140 g of TNT
  - Full assembly: 1.6 kg
  - KPOM-2 cassette: 48 kg
- Diameter: 63 mm
- Height: 180 mm
- Target sensors
  - Number: 4
  - Length (of all four): 10 m
- Activation pressure: 0.1–0.3 kgf (0.98–2.94 N)
- Fragmentation radius: 16 m
- Temperature range of use: -40 to +50 °С
- Shelf life: 10 years
- Self-liquidation time

Temperature Range, °С	Liquidation Timeframe, hours
+40 to +50	4 to 14
+20 to +40	6 to 16
0 to +20	9 to 30
-20 to 0	13 to 39
-30 to -20	15 to 70
-40 to -30	25 to 114

== See also ==
- PFM-1 – (Soviet Union)
- PMN mine – (Soviet Union)
- POM-3 mine – (Russia)
- PTM-3 mine – (Soviet Union)
