= Timeline of the war in Donbas (2021) =

- 2014; 2015; 2016; 2017; 2018; 2019; 2020; 2021; 2022

This is a timeline of the war in Donbas for the year 2021.

== January–March ==
- 1 January: The Ukrainian press centre of the Ukrainian Joint Forces reported nine pro-Russian violations of the ceasefire agreement on this date. In the eastern area of operations, the stronghold of Avdiivka received fire from small arms, automatic grenade launchers and 82 mm mortars. An incoming hostile drone that had taken off from Yakovliivka was neutralized by Ukrainian forces with electronic countermeasures. Vodiane, in the region of Pryazova (around Mariupol) was the target of small arms and anti-tank rocket fire. Small arms fire was also reported at Pavlopil. In the northern front, pro-Russian forces fired heavy machine guns and different grenade-launcher systems at Ukrainian positions around Zolote-4, while Ukrainian troops were harassed with small arms fire at Novoluhanske. Ukrainian forces fired back.
- 11 January: The Ukrainian Joint Forces press centre reported 11 pro-Russian attacks on their forces on this date. All the incidents occurred in the eastern area of operations. Ukrainian troops at Pisky received fire from small arms and heavy machine guns; one Ukrainian soldier was killed in action. Avdiivka and Pavlopil were hit by anti-tank rockets, and Avdiivka also received small arms fire. Small arms fire was also registered at Vodiane, as well as sniper fire in the surroundings of Donetsk city. A pro-Russian drone flying over Krasnohorivka was neutralized by Ukrainian forces.
- 25 January: The press centre of the Ukrainian Joint Forces recorded seven pro-Russian violations of the truce, most of them in the northern area of operations. Pivdenne became the target of heavy machine guns, anti-tank-rocket launchers, 120 mm mortars and anti-tank guided missiles. Nearby Vilnyi received fire from small arms, heavy machine guns, automatic grenade launchers and anti-tank rocket launchers. One Ukrainian soldier was wounded in action.
- 27 January: According to the Ukrainian Joint Forces press centre, pro-Russian forces launched ten attacks on their positions. In the eastern area of operations, Pavlopil became the target of small arms, heavy machine guns, grenade launchers and 120 mm mortars. Ukrainian positions at the protected area of Bohdanivka were hit by small arms fire, sniper and heavy machine gun fire, as well as anti-tank rockets. Under-barrel launched grenades were fired at Ukrainian troops in Vodiane, while automatic rifle fire was reported at Marinka and Avdiivka. Luhanske was hit by anti-tank rockets, and Zaitseve was shelled with automatic grenade launchers. There was return fire from Ukrainian positions.
- 22 February: The Ukrainian Joint Forces press center recorded 11 pro-Russian violations of the truce throughout the day. Two soldiers were killed in action and three wounded. In the eastern front, Ukrainian positions around Avdiivka were hit by different types of grenades and rockets; one serviceman was killed and another wounded in the area. The Ukrainian stronghold of Vodiane received fire from small arms, different grenade-launcher systems, POM-2 landmine launchers and 82 mm mortars. Marinka was hit by anti-tank rockets, while Ukrainian troops at Pervomaisk were harassed with small arms fire. In the northern area of operations, Pivdenne became the target of small arms, heavy machine guns and automatic grenade launchers, while later in the night, Zaitseve was hit by anti-tank rockets and 82 mm mortar volleys. One soldier was killed and another wounded.
- 24 February: The Ukrainian Joint Forces press center recorded six pro-Russian attacks on their troops. In the eastern area of operations, Avdiivka and Vodiane came under fire from automatic rifles and different grenade-launcher systems. Ukrainian redoubts near Marinka received anti-tank rocket fire, while small arms fire was reported at Talakivka. In Chermalyk, a Ukrainian sentry was wounded with a blade weapon when pro-Russian troops attacked his position. The sentry reacted, and a pro-Russian soldier was taken prisoner. In the northern front, Ukrainian troops at Pivdenne were harassed with automatic fire, and another Ukrainian serviceman was wounded.
- 26 February: The press center of the Ukrainian Joint Forces recorded an escalation in hostilities around the demarcation line on this date. Pro-Russian forces launched 14 attacks on Ukrainian positions. In the eastern area of operations, the Ukrainian stronghold of Vodiane was hit by 120 mm mortars barrages; nine Ukrainian soldiers were wounded. The area also received fire from small arms and different grenade-launcher systems. Pisky came under the combined fire of 82 mm and 120 mm mortars. Ukrainian positions in the area also became the target of small arms and heavy machine guns. Kamianka was fired at from small arms, automatic grenade launchers and anti-tank recoilless rifles. The explosion of a roadside bomb wounded a Ukrainian soldier near Nevelske. Small arms fire was reported at Marinka and Lebedinske. In the northern front, Luhanske was targeted by heavy-machine guns, snipers, anti-tank rocket launchers and POM-2 landmine launchers. Pivdenne and Svitlodarsk were attacked using small arms, automatic grenade launchers and anti-tank recoilless rifles.
- 26 March: The Ukrainian Joint Forces press center recorded four pro-Russian violations of the truce throughout the day. Four Ukrainian soldiers were killed and two others wounded in the afternoon when pro-Russian forces shelled Ukrainian positions with 82 mm mortars near the village of Shumy, in the area of Horlivka, in the northern front. The separatists also employed heavy machine guns and automatic grenade launchers. Ukrainian troops returned fire. The fighting was still ongoing by 06:00 pm. Ukrainian redoubts came also under automatic rifle and anti-tank rocket fire near Mayorsk, in the same area of operations. With the latest casualties the death toll in Eastern Ukraine since the beginning of the July 2020 truce reached 45 servicemen killed in action. Another 75 were wounded.

== April–June ==
- 1 April: An escalation in hostilities was reported by the press centre of the Ukrainian Joint Forces, with 13 pro-Russian violations of the ceasefire on this date. In the eastern area of operations, Ukrainian redoubts around Pisky were shelled with 82 mm and 120 mm mortars. The strongholds of Avdiivka, Starohnativka and Vodiane became the target of small arms and different grenade-launcher systems. An anti-tank guided missile also landed in Vodiane. In the northern front, Shumy and Novotoshkivka received fire from automatic grenade launchers. Two Ukrainian servicemen were wounded in action. Pro-Russian forces fired small arms, heavy machine guns and anti-tank rocket launchers at Ukrainian positions near Svitlodarsk, Zolote-4 and Luhanske. Ukrainian forces fired back.
- 2 April: The Ukrainian Joint Forces press center recorded 21 pro-Russian violations of the truce throughout the day. Two soldiers were wounded in action. In the eastern front, Ukrainian positions around Krasnohorivka, and the villages of Pyshchevyk and Hnutove, were hit by 120 mm mortar volleys. A civilian resident was wounded at Krasnohorivka. An anti-tank guided missile landed in Opytne. Vodiane and Avdiivka received anti-tank rocket fire. Small arms fire was reported at Pisky. In the northern area of operations, Zolote-4 and Novooleksandrivka were struck by 82 mm and 120 mm mortar barrages. Ukrainian positions at Novotoshkivka, Novoluhanske and Svitlodarsk became the target of different grenade-launcher systems. Ukrainian troops at Novotoshkivke and Svitlodarsk were also harassed with machine gun fire.
- 5 April: The press centre of the Ukrainian Joint Forces recorded seven violations of the ceasefire by pro-Russian forces. Two Ukrainian soldiers were killed by gunfire.
- 6 April: A further escalation of hostilities was reported by the Ukrainian Joint Forces' press centre, with 14 pro-Russian violations of the ceasefire. Two Ukrainian soldiers were killed by pro-Russian separatists in eastern Ukraine amid escalating tensions and a military build-up along the border between Russia and Ukraine.
- 8 April: The Ukrainian Joint Forces press centre reported that pro-Russian forces violated the ceasefire agreement 15 times. A Ukrainian soldier of the 36th Separate Brigade of the Marine Corps, was killed by sniper fire from the pro-Russian forces in Donetsk region. Another Ukrainian soldier was also killed by artillery shelling near Luhansk.
- 9 April: The Ukrainian military used for the first time a Turkish drone Bayraktar TB2 for a reconnaissance mission over the Donbas. The drones had been delivered to Ukraine in June 2019.
- 10 April: The Ukrainian Joint Forces press centre announced they had recorded ten ceasefire violations, including small arms fire and mortar attacks. One Ukrainian soldier was killed and another was wounded due to the violations.
- 12 April: The Ukrainian Joint forces press centre said that they had recorded 17 ceasefire violations by Pro-Russian forces, leaving one Ukrainian soldier dead. In the northern area of operations, pro-Russian forces attacked Pivdenne with automatic rifles, anti-tank rocket launchers, 120 mm mortars and armoured fighting vehicles. Ukrainian positions at Shumy and Zaitseve received fire from small arms, heavy machine guns, different types of grenade launchers and 82 mm mortars. Pro-Russian armoured fighting vehicles, supported by anti-tank rocket fire, launched an attack on Ukrainian redoubts at New York. Zaitseve was meanwhile targeted with anti-tank rocket launchers and POM-2 landmine launchers. In the eastern front, small arms and heavy machine guns were fired at Pisky and Kamianka.
- 13 April: From midnight to 7 am, Pro-Russian forces were still conducting attacks in breach of the ceasefire agreement, including mortar attacks. One Ukrainian soldier was killed after a pro-Russian drone dropped several grenades on Ukrainian positions in the village of Mayorsk. Another two soldiers were wounded in this attack.
  NATO Secretary General Jens Stoltenberg called the new Russian build-up along Ukrainian borders "unjustified and deeply concerning".
- 18 April: The Ukrainian Joint forces press centre recorded eight ceasefire violations including attacks from mortars and grenade launchers, targeting Ukrainian positions. Ukrainian forces returned fire in response. During the attacks, one Ukrainian soldier was killed and another was wounded.
- 21 April: The press centre of the Ukrainian Join Forces recorded eight violations of the ceasefire by pro-Russian forces. In the eastern area of operations, 120 mm mortar barrages landed in Pisky. The village was also hit by anti-tank guided missiles. Kamianka became the target of 73 mm anti-tank recoilless rifles, while Krasnohorivka received fire from automatic grenade launchers. In the northern front, pro-Russian armoured fighting vehicles engaged Ukrainian redoubts near Novhorodske. Nearby Pivdenne was hit by anti-tank guided missiles and shelled with 120 mm mortars. Pro-Russian forces pounded Ukrainian positions at Shumy and Pervomaiske with heavy machine guns, automatic grenade launchers and 82 mm mortars.
- 22 April: According to the press center of the Ukrainian Joint Forces recorded 17 pro-Russian attacks on their forces on 22 April. A Ukrainian soldier was killed in action. In the eastern front, 73 mm anti-tank recoilless rifles fired upon Ukrainian redoubts at Krasnohorivka. Pisky, Vodiane and Pavlopil received fire from automatic rifles, heavy machine guns and automatic grenade launchers. In the northern area of operations, Zaitseve and Pivdenne came under the combined shelling of 82 mm and 120 mm mortars. Mayorsk became the target of small arms, 73 mm anti-tank recoilless rifles and anti-tank guided missiles, while Ukrainian troops at Zolote-4 were harassed with small arms, heavy machine guns and automatic grenade launchers.
  Russian Defense Minister Sergey Shoygu announced that Russian forces will begin to return "to their permanent bases in the Southern and Western Military Districts" from 23 April after "completing a combat readiness check of military units".
- 23 April: The Joint Ukrainian Forces press center reported 20 pro-Russian attacks on their positions. In the eastern area of operation, Novoselivka received fire from 82 mm and 120 mm mortars, while Avdiivka, Marinka, Krasnohorivka, Lebendiske and Pisky became the target of small arms, heavy machine guns and different grenade-launcher systems. Pro-Russian troops fired automatic grenade launchers at Vodiane. In the northern front, Novhorodske and Shumy were shelled by the combined fire of 82 mm and 120 mm mortars. POM-2 anti-personnel mines were also launched in the area of Novhorodske. Pivdenne was hit by 120 mm mortar volleys and anti-tank guided missiles. Pro-Russian forces used grenade launchers of various systems, heavy machine guns and rifles to attack Ukrainian positions at Svitlodarsk and Luhanske.
  Ukrainian Deputy Prime Minister and Minister for Reintegration of Temporarily Occupied Territories Oleksiy Reznikov states that Russian President Vladimir Putin announcement that Ukraine should negotiate directly with representatives of the Popular Republics of Donetsk and Luhansk "signals Russia's withdrawal from the Minsk agreements".
- 4 May: The Ukrainian Joint Forces press center reported that during an attack with 73 mm anti-tank recoilless rifles and 120 mm mortars by Pro-Russian sources on Krasnohorivka, in the eastern area of operations, the Maryinska central district hospital, with 45 patients undergoing COVID-19, was hit, losing power supply. Windows were also shattered in the main building. There were five pro-Russian attacks elsewhere. Vodiane was also hit by 120 mm mortar volleys, while heavy machine guns were fired at Ukrainian positions in nearby Avdiivka. In the northern front, pro-Russian forces fired different grenade-launchers at Ukrainian positions around Luhanske. A pro-Russian drone overflying the northern sector of the demarcation line, from Novoluhanske to Novhorodske, was jammed by Ukrainian troops using electronic countermeasures.
- 6 May: The press center of the Ukrainian Joint Forces recorded 16 pro-Russian violations of the ceasefire, in an escalation of the hostilities. In the eastern area of operations, Pisky came under intense fire from small arms, heavy machine guns and different grenade-launchers systems. Two Ukrainian soldiers were killed in action around this village, and another wounded. Ukrainian troops were also harassed with heavy machine gun fire in Pyshchevyk and Novotroitske. A pro-Russian drone dropped two VOG-17 grenades on Ukrainian positions in the surroundings of Talakivka. In the northern area of operations, Luhanske received fire from heavy machine guns, automatic grenade launchers and 73 mm anti-tank recoilless rifles. The Ukrainian stronghold was also shelled with 82 mm and 120 mm mortars. Novhorodske became the target of heavy machine guns, anti-tank rocket launchers and 82 mm mortars. Pivdenne was fired at by 73 mm anti-tank recoilless rifles and POM-2 anti-personnel mines launchers. Small arms fire was reported at Shumy. The separatists used automatic rifles and different grenade-launchers to attack Ukrainian forces at Novotoshkivke, while anti-tank rocket fire was reported at Zaitseve.
  U.S. Secretary of State Antony Blinken said at Kyiv that significant Russian forces remain at Ukraine's border, and that they still "has the capacity to take aggressive action against Ukraine" if they so choose.
- 7 May: The Ukrainian Joint Forces press center reported 11 pro-Russian attacks on their positions. In the eastern area of operations, Ukrainian positions at Pisky came under the combined fire of heavy machine guns, anti-tank rocket launchers, 82 mm mortars and 120 mm mortars. Avdiivka received fire from anti-tank rocket launchers, while pro-Russian troops fired under-barrel grenades at Vodiane. Heavy machine gun fire was recorded at Nevelske. In the northern front, Ukrainian redoubts around Shumy were pounded by 122 mm self-propelled artillery. The area also was fired at from small arms, heavy machine guns and 120 mm mortars. Near Pivdenne, pro-Russian forces spread anti-tank mines from POM-2 launchers, while Novhorodske was shelled with 120 mm mortars. In Novotoshkivke, Ukrainian positions were hit by grenades fired from automatic launchers and anti-tank rockets. Heavy machine gun fire was recorded at Vernkhniotoretske.
- 8 May: The press centre of the Ukrainian Join Forces recorded nine violations of the ceasefire by pro-Russian forces. In the eastern front, pro-Russian forces fired automatic grenade launchers and 100 mm antitank guns at Marinka. Avdiivka and Opytne were hit by small arms and 82 mm mortars. In the northern area of operations, Ukrainian positions at Pivdenne received fire from 120 mm mortars and 122 mm artillery. Zolote-4 and Novhorodske came under fire from heavy machine guns and different grenade-launcher systems.
- 13 May: The press center of the Ukrainian Joint Forces reported an escalation in the Donbas. Pro-Russian forces broke the ceasefire agreement 19 times. One Ukrainian serviceman was killed. In the eastern area of operations, pro-Russian tanks, supported by small arms, heavy machine guns, different grenade-launcher systems, 120 mm mortars and 122 mm self-propelled artillery, engaged Ukrainian positions around Pisky. Lebedinske, Hnutove and Pavlopil were hit by 120 mm mortar volleys, while Novoselivka received fire from heavy machine guns, anti-tank rocket launchers and 73 mm anti-tank recoilless rifles. Novotroitske came under fire from small arms and anti-tank rocket launchers. Ukrainian positions at Vodiane were shelled with automatic grenade launchers and 73 mmanti-tank recoilless rifles. In the northern front, Verkhniotoretske became the target of heavy machine guns, anti-tank rocket launchers and 73 mm anti-tank recoilless rifles. Luhanske was struck by heavy machine gun fire and anti-tank rockets. Pro-Russian forces also fired heavy machine guns and automatic grenade launchers at Ukrainian positions near Novozvanivka and 73 mm anti-tank recoilless rifles at Pivdenne.
- 26 May: According to the press center of the Ukrainian Joint Forces, pro-Russian troops broke the ceasefire on nine occasions. In the eastern area of operations, 120 mm mortar volleys landed in Pisky, while heavy machine guns and 73 mm anti-tank recoilless rifles were fired near Krasnohorivka. Pavlopil received fire from small arms and different grenade-launcher systems, and Vodiane from under-barrel grenade launchers and anti-tank rocket launchers. Sniper fire was reported at Avdiivka. In the northern front, pro-Russian armoured fighting vehicles launched an attack on Krymske, supported by 120 mm mortars. Prychepilivka became the target of small arms, heavy machine guns, different grenade- launcher systems and 82 mm mortars. Ukrainian troops at Pivdenne were harassed with small arms and heavy machine guns.
  Former Ukrainian president Leonid Kravchuk said that the Minsk talks should be moved from Belarus because of the political situation there and the suspension of flights between the two countries.
- 27 May: According to the Wall Street Journal, Russia has moved warplanes to Crimea and bases near Ukraine to an extent greater than has previously been disclosed, adding to its capability for political intimidation or military intervention, according to commercial satellite photos of areas being used for the military buildup.
- 30 May: According to the Ukrainian Joint Forces press center, pro-Russians forces violated the ceasefire four times. All incidents occurred in the northern area of operations. Around Mayorsk, Ukrainian positions were targeted with small arms, heavy machine guns, anti-tank rocket launchers and 82 caliber mortars. Ukrainian troops at Pivdenne received anti-tank rocket fire, while mines were planted by POM-2 launchers in the same area. Zolote-4 was attacked by the separatists with small arms and antitank rocket launchers.
- 16 June: The press center of the Ukrainian Joint Forces recorded nine pro-Russian attacks on their positions. In the eastern area of operations, 82 mm mortar volleys landed in Talakivka and Novoselivka. Vodiane and the stronghold of Avdiivka were hit by small arms fire, heavy machine gun fire and anti-tank rockets. In the northern front, Zaitseve became the target of 82 mm mortars, while BMP-1 pro-Russian armoured vehicles engaged Ukrainian redoubts at Novhorodske. Luhanske came under fire from heavy machine guns, automatic grenade launchers and anti-tank rocket launchers. Ukrainian troops at Novotoshkivke were harassed with small arms fire and different grenade-launcher systems. One Ukrainian serviceman was wounded in action.
- 30 June: The Ukrainian Joint Forces press center reported ten pro-Russian attacks on their positions. In the eastern area of operations, Ukrainian positions at Vodiane came under the combined fire of small arms, anti-tank rocket launchers and 73 mm anti-tank recoilless rifles. Novoselivka received fire from 73 mm anti-tank recoilless rifles, while pro-Russian troops fired heavy machine guns at Krasnohorivka. In the northern front, pro-Russian BMP-1 armoured vehicles engaged Ukrainian redoubts at Novhorodske, supported by heavy machine guns and 82 mm mortar fire. Zolote was hit by anti-tank rockets, while Ukrainian positions around Orihove were attacked with small arms fire and automatic grenade launchers. Near Pivdenne, pro-Russian forces fired heavy machine guns and anti-tank rocket launchers.

== July–September ==
- 1 July: In an escalation of hostilities, the press center of the Ukrainian Joint Forces recorded 26 pro-Russian attacks on their positions. In the eastern area of operations, heavy shelling was reported around the stronghold of Avdiivka, where the Ukrainian garrison became the target of heavy machine guns, various grenade-launcher systems, 82 mm mortars, 120 mm mortars and 122 mm self-propelled artillery. The coastal town of Shyrokyne received fire from automatic grenade launchers, 82 mm mortars and 120 mm mortars. Starohnativka was pounded by the combined fire of 82 mm mortars, 120 mm mortars and 122 mm self-propelled guns; 120 mm mortar volleys also landed in Talakivka. Pro-Russian troops fired heavy machine guns, automatic grenade launchers and 73 mm anti-tank recoilless rifle, while in Zaitseve Ukrainian troops were harassed with heavy machine gun fire. Opytne was targeted with small arms and different grenade-launcher systems. Small arms and 73 mm anti-tank recoilless rifles were fired at Slavne. In the northern front, Svitlodarsk came under fire from heavy machine guns, automatic grenade launchers and 73 mm anti-tank recoilless rifles. Ukrainian positions at Novotoshkivke were racked with small arms fire and grenade launchers of different types, while heavy machine gun fire was reported at Novooleksandrivka. A pro-Russian drone launched a strike on Ukrainian redoubts at Zolote-4 using VOG-17 grenade launchers. A Ukrainian soldier was wounded.
  The Ukrainian Parliament votes for renaming the city of Novhorodske to its original name of New York, given to the town by its Plautdietsch-speaking Mennonites founders at the late 18th century.
- 4 July: According to the Ukrainian Joint Forces press center, pro-Russians forces violated the ceasefire six times, all of them in the eastern area of operations. The separatists fired twice on the Ukrainian stronghold of Vodiane using small arms and different grenade-launcher systems. Ukrainian positions around Avdiivka received fire from heavy machine guns and 73 mm anti-tank recoilless rifles; the same kind of weapons were employed to attack Ukrainian forces at Mirne. Berezove was shelled with automatic grenade launchers, while Taramchuk was hit by heavy machine gun rounds and anti-tank rockets. A Ukrainian Army medical officer with the rank of captain was killed in action when pro-Russian forces shelled the positions of the 93rd Mechanized Brigade.
- 13 July: The press center of the Ukrainian Joint Forces reported 13 pro-Russian attacks on their troops. One Ukrainian soldier was killed in action, and other six wounded. One of the injured, a lieutenant, died of wounds in a military hospital at Kharkiv on 24 July. In the eastern zone of operations, Prichepilivka was struck by the combined fire of 120 mm mortars and 152 mm self-propelled artillery, while urban areas of Taramchuk were hit by 122 mm artillery barrages; 120 mm mortar volleys landed in Vodiane. Pavlopil and Shyrokyne were shelled with 82 mm mortars. In the northern front, Troitske received fire from 73 mm anti-tank recoilless rifles and 82 mm mortars. Ukrainian positions near Yuzhne became the target of heavy machine guns and automatic grenade launchers. In Luhanske, Ukrainian troops were harassed with small arms and heavy machine gun fire.
- 24 July: Russian Central Election Commission adopted a resolution that allowed Russian passport holders in both separatist republics in Donbas to register and vote in Duma elections.
- 26 July: The Ukrainian Joint Forces press center recorded 15 pro-Russian violations of the truce. Seven Ukrainian soldiers were wounded in action. Most of the attacks occurred in the eastern front, where Vodiane came under fire from automatic grenade launchers, 73 mm anti-tank recoilless rifles, 82 mm mortars, 120 mm mortars and anti-tank guided missiles on four occasions. Starohnativka was pounded with 82 mm mortars, 120 mm mortars and 122 mm self-propelled artillery. Halitsnivka, in the area of Marinka, was also hit by 122 mm artillery volleys. Opytne became the target of 82 mm mortars. Shyrokyne received fire from anti-tank rocket launchers and 73 mm anti-tank recoilless rifles. Kamianka and Prichepilivka were hit by anti-tank rocket fire. Pro-Russian drones overflew Ukrainian positions on both operational areas.
- 7 August: A military truck crane was hit by an anti-tank guided missile in Pisky; one Ukrainian soldier was killed and another seriously wounded. Ukrainian forces fired back.
- 19 August: The Ukrainian Joint Forces press center reported nine pro-Russian violations of the truce. Seven of them were direct attacks on Ukrainian forces, the other two were overflights of hostile drones over Ukrainian positions. One Ukrainian soldier was killed in action. In the eastern front, heavy machine guns and 73 mm anti-tank recoilless rifles were fired at Ukrainian redoubts around Krasnohorivka. Nevelske, Novozvanivka and Pivdenne came under fire from anti-tank rocket launchers; Ukrainian troops at Novozvanivka, Pivdenne and Novooleksandrivka also received small arms fire. In the northern area of operations, Krymske was shelled with 120 mm mortars, while the surroundings of New York received fire from 73 mm anti-tank recoilless rifles.
- 23 August: The press center of the Ukrainian Joint Forces recorded four pro-Russian attacks on Ukrainian positions. In the eastern area of operations, Vodiane was shelled with 120 mm mortars, while Marinka received fire from small arms and automatic grenade launchers. A pro-Russian drone launched a bomb attack on Shyrokyne. In the northern front, Ukrainian positions at Luhanske were overflown by an Orlan-10 hostile drone. One Ukrainian soldier was killed in action, the second Ukrainian dead in combat in the last 24 hours.
- 28 August: According to the Ukrainian Joint Forces press center, pro-Russian forced violated the ceasefire on 18 occasions. In the eastern area of operations, Avdiivka received the combined fire of 120 mm mortars and 122 mm self-propelled artillery; eight Ukrainian soldiers were wounded and a maintenance workshop in the railway station was damaged. Passengers and workers were evacuated to shelters, and the service was suspended for three days. Others areas of Avdiivka also became the target of automatic grenade launchers, antitank rocket launchers and 120 mm mortars. Pro-Russian forces fired 73 mm anti-tank recoilless rifles, 82 mm mortars and 120 mm mortars at Ukrainian positions at nearby Krasnohorivka; 82 mm mortar volleys also landed in Vodiane and Nevelske. Hranitne was hit by the combined fire of 73 mm anti-tank recoilless rifles and 120 mm mortars. In the northern front, Yuzhne was hit by anti-tank rockets and 122 mm artillery barrages. Troitske came under fire from small arms, heavy machine guns, 73 mm anti-tank recoilless rifles and 82 mm mortars, while Luhanske was fired at from heavy machine guns and 73 mm anti-tank recoilless rifles. The separatists shelled Svitlodarsk with 73 mm anti-tank recoilless rifles and Travneve with automatic grenade launchers. A civilian residence was damaged.
- 30 August: The press center of the Ukrainian Joint Forces reported 11 pro-Russian attacks on their troops. One Ukrainian soldier was killed in action, and two others wounded. In the eastern front, Vodiane became the target of automatic grenade launchers and anti-tank rocket launchers. Ukrainian troops at Shyrokyne were harassed with heavy machine gun fire. In the northern area of operations, Novozvanivka came under sustained attack from heavy machine guns, automatic grenade launchers, anti-tank rocket launchers, 120 mm mortars and anti-tank guided missiles. Pro-Russian forces launched a drone strike on Novotoshkivke through a pilotless aircraft that fired a VOG-17 grenade on Ukrainian positions. The same area became the target of 73 mm anti-tank recoilless rifles. Shumy was meanwhile targeted with small arms and 73 mm anti-tank recoilless rifles. Katerinivka was shelled with automatic grenade launchers. In nearby Troitske, Ukrainian positions received heavy machine gun fire.
- 8 September: According to the Ukrainian Joint Forces press center, pro-Russians forces violated the ceasefire 11 times. Two Ukrainian soldiers were wounded in action. In the eastern area of operations, pro-Russian 122 mm artillery engaged Ukrainian positions around Kryakivka and Krasnohorivka, while 120 mm mortar volleys landed in Opytne and Avdiivka. Pavlopil was shelled with 73 mm anti-tank recoilless rifles, and Ukrainian troops received fire from heavy machine guns and anti-tank rocket launchers. In the northern front, Zolote-4 became the target of small arms, automatic grenade launchers and 73 mm anti-tank recoilless rifles. A pro-Russian drone carried out an air strike by launching two bombs on Zaitseve. One of the bombs exploded near a road, the other was defused by Ukrainian technicians.
- 11 September: The Ukrainian press center of the Ukrainian Joint Forces reported 14 pro-Russian attacks on Ukrainian troops. In the eastern area of operations, Novohnativka was hit by 122 mm artillery barrages; civilian infrastructure was severely damaged. Starohnativka became the target of 73 mm anti-tank recoilless rifles. Prichepilivka was struck by anti-tank rockets and 120 mm mortar volleys, and Vodiane by small arms fire and automatically launched grenades. Talakivka received fire from heavy machine guns and anti-tank rocket launchers. Ukrainian soldiers at Novooleksandrivka were harassed with heavy machine gun fire. In the northern front, 122 mm self-propelled artillery engaged Ukrainian redoubts at Novotoshkivke. Nearby New York, besides a heavy machine gun and anti-tank rocket attack, was the target of a pro-Russian drone strike; the unmanned aircraft dropped an 82 mm mortar bomb. Zolote-4 came under attack from small arms, automatic grenade launchers and anti-tank rocket launchers. Two Ukrainian soldiers were reported killed and 10 others wounded. Another soldier was killed in action the following day.
- 13 September: The press center of the Ukrainian Joint Forces reported 12 pro-Russian attacks on their troops. One Ukrainian soldier was killed in action, the fourth in just three days and the 54th in 2021 so far. Most incidents occurred in the northern front. New York was hit by 122 mm artillery barrages, while Verkhnyotoretske was shelled with 120 mm mortars. There was an anti-tank rocket attack on Ukrainian positions near Zolote-4 and Popasna. In the latter case, the separatists also fired a heavy machine gun. Katerinivka received fire from small arms and different grenade-launcher systems. In the eastern area of operations, Prichepilivka became the target of small arms, heavy machine guns and 82 mm mortars. Novooleksandrivka received fire from small arms, heavy machine guns and different grenade-launcher systems.

== October–December ==
- 13 October: Ukrainian forces announced that a Russian citizen, whom they described as a Russian soldier, was captured while on an alleged armed reconnaissance mission in no-man land, along with members of the Luhansk People's Republic army. The detainee, Andrei Kosyak, was wearing an armband of the Joint Military Commission (JCCC), a body that monitors the ceasefire since 2015. Russia's Foreign Ministry spokeswoman, Maria Zakharova, asked the Ukrainian government to stop "provocations" and allow free access to the prisoner.
- 15 October: The Ukrainian Joint Forces press center recorded eight pro-Russian violations of the ceasefire. One Ukrainian soldier was wounded. In the eastern area of operations, Lebedinske was hit by 120 mm mortar volleys, while Avdiivka was shelled with 82 mm mortars. Krasnohorivka received fire from heavy machine guns and 73 mm anti-tank recoilless rifles. In the northern front, pro-Russian forces fired 120 mm mortars and anti-tank guided missiles at Novozvanivka. Zolote-4 became the target of small arms and 120 mm mortars, and nearby Novotoshkivke was pounded with 73 mm anti-tank recoilless rifles and anti-tank guided missiles.
- 26 October: A Ukrainian Bayraktar TB2 drone destroyed a pro-Russian 122 mm gun that had fired 120 rounds at Hranitne the previous night, in an attempt to hit a bridge over the river Kalmius recently built by Ukrainian forces. Local Ukrainian authorities said that their only intention was to allow people living in the buffer zone to buy groceries in the village.
- 12 November: Two Ukrainian soldiers were killed in action, amid eight pro-Russian attacks on Ukrainian positions reported by the Ukrainian Joint Forces press center. The servicemen, among them a lieutenant colonel, died when the vehicle they were driving in was struck by a roadside bomb. Another soldier was wounded by small arms fire. In the eastern area of operations, the Ukrainian stronghold of Novotroitske was hit by a combined barrage of 120 mm mortars and 122 mm self-propelled artillery. Ukrainian troops at Shyrokyne received small arms fire. In the northern zone, Zaitseve became the target of different grenade-launcher systems and 120 mm mortars. At Popasna and Novooleksandrivka, pro-Russian forces fired heavy machine guns and different grenade-launcher systems. Novoluhanske was fired at from small arms, heavy machine guns and automatic grenade launchers.
- 14 November: According to the Ukrainian Joint Forces press center, pro-Russian forces broke the ceasefire on 19 occasions. In the eastern area of operations, Nevelske was the subject of heavy shelling from 122 mm artillery and 120 mm mortars. The driver of a military ambulance and two civilian residents were wounded. Two military ambulances and two residential buildings were damaged. Chermalyk was hit by anti-tank missiles, while Novooleksandrivka received 120 mm mortar fire. Ukrainian positions at Prichepilivka became the target of heavy machine guns, anti-tank rocket launchers, 73 mm anti-tank recoilless rifles and POM-2 minelayers. In the northern front, Orikhove was pounded with 152 mm self-propelled artillery. Krymske received the combined fire of 82 mm and 120 mm mortars; 82 mm mortar volleys also landed in Zolote-4, where the separatists also fired heavy machine guns and different grenade-launcher systems. Novoluhanske and Katerinivka were fired at from small arms and anti-tank rocket launchers. Yuzhne was targeted with different grenade-launcher systems.
- 22 November: Kyrylo Budanov, head of the Ukrainian military intelligence agency, reported that FGM-148 Javelin anti-tank missiles had been fired by the Ukrainian forces during combat operations in the Donbas region.
- 25 November: One Ukrainian serviceman was killed in action amid two pro-Russian attacks on Ukrainian positions, both of them in the eastern area of operations. Marinka was shelled with 82 mm mortars, while small arms fire was reported at Novomykhailivka. Ukrainian forces fired back.
- 1 December: Ukraine builds up 125k soldiers along the border with separatist held territory, the Russian Foreign Ministry claims. When asked for comment, Ukrainian military authorities decline. In addition, one Ukrainian soldier was killed in action amid four pro-Russian violations of the ceasefire, according to the press center of the Ukrainian Joint Forces. Most incidents took place in the eastern area of operations, where Avdiivka became the target of heavy machine guns and 73 mm anti-tank recoilless rifles. Anti-personnel mines were launched around Marinka from POM-2 minelayers, while Ukrainian troops at Novotroitske were harassed with small arms fire. In the northern front, Shumy received fire from small arms, anti-tank rocket launchers and 120 mm mortars.
- 2 December: The Ukrainian Joint Forces press center recorded six pro-Russian violations of the ceasefire. One Ukrainian soldier was wounded. In the eastern area of operations, 120 mm mortar barrages landed in Krasnohorivka, while Shirokyne and Vodiane received fire from 73 mm anti-tank recoilless rifles. In the latter settlement, Ukrainian troops were also harassed with small arms fire. In the northern front, Novoluhanske was hit by anti-tank rockets and 82 mm mortar volleys. Ukrainian positions at Katerinivka received small arms fire and different grenade-launcher systems. Small arms fire was registered at Svitlodarsk.
- 3 December: According to the Ukrainian Joint Forces press center, pro-Russian forces broke the ceasefire agreement on six occasions; one Ukrainian soldier was wounded. In the eastern area of operations, Ukrainian positions at Krasnohorivka were shelled with T-12 anti-tank guns. In the northern front, pro-Russian BMP-1 armoured vehicles engaged Ukrainian redoubts near Stanitsya Luhanska supported by 120 mm artillery fire. Krymske was hit by heavy machine gun fire, 73 mm anti-tank rounds and 82 mm mortar volleys. Popasna became the target of small arms, heavy machine guns and 73 mm anti-tank recoilless rifles, while Zaitseve received fire from small arms and different grenade-launcher systems.
- 6 December: The leaders of the self-proclaimed Donetsk People's Republic and Luhansk People's Republic, Denis Pushilin and Leonid Pasechnik, became members of the Russian ruling party United Russia. United Russia chairman Dmitry Medvedev personally handed them their party tickets during the party's annual congress in Moscow.
- 8 December: According to the Ukrainian Institute of National Remembrance, 4,488 Ukrainian soldiers had been killed in action or had died of wounds since the beginning of the conflict so far.
- 16 December: One Ukrainian soldier was killed by hostile fire from Pro-Russian separatists, amid five pro-Russian attacks on Ukrainian forces. A total of 65 Ukrainian servicemen were reported killed during 2021, compared with 50 in 2020. In the northern front, pro-Russian forces fired automatic grenade launchers at Zolote-4 and Maiske, while Ukrainian troops at Novoluhanske were harassed with small arms fire. In the eastern area of operations, Pisky became the target of anti-tank rocket launchers and 82 mm mortars. Small arms fire was meanwhile reported at Pavlopil. Ukrainian troops fired back.
- 22 December: Ukraine and the pro-Russian rebel republics agreed to restore the ceasefire deal brokered by Europe's OSCE security organisation in July 2020. The OSCE reported 564 violations of the truce in Donetsk Oblast and 49 in Luhansk Oblast throughout the day. No hostile incidents were recorded by the Ukrainian Joint Forces press center. Ukrainian troops conducted anti-tank missile trials in the Donbas region with FGM-148 Javelin missiles.
- 24 December: The Ukrainian Joint Forces press center recorded five pro-Russian violations of the ceasefire. One Ukrainian soldier was wounded. In the eastern area of operations, Marinka was shelled with 120 mm mortars, while Ukrainian positions at Novozvanivka became the target of 73 mm anti-tank recoilless rifles. In the northern front, pro-Russian forces engaged Ukrainian troops with small arms, heavy machine guns, under-barrel launched grenades and automatic grenade launchers. Near Novoluhanske, Ukrainian soldiers were harassed with small arms fire.
- 26 December: The press center of the Ukrainian Joint Forces reported five pro-Russian attacks on Ukrainian positions. One Ukrainian soldier was wounded in action. In the eastern area of operations, Pisky received fire from different grenade-launcher systems, while a pro-Russian drone dropped VOG-17 grenades at Ukrainian redoubts around Talakivka. In the northern front Novoluhanske, Yuzhne and Shumy came under attack from different types of grenade launchers.
- 27 December: According to the Ukrainian Joint Forces press center, pro-Russian forces broke the ceasefire agreement on ten occasions; two Ukrainian soldiers were wounded. In the eastern area of operations, Marinka was hit by a 120 mm mortar barrage. A pro-Russian drone dropped VOG-17 grenades at Ukrainian positions at Hnutove. Krasnohorivka and Travneve received fire from automatic grenade launchers. In the northern front, pro-Russian forces fired anti-tank guided missiles at Novozvanivka. Ukrainian forces at New York were attacked three times with small arms, heavy machine guns and automatic grenade launchers. Lobacheve became the target of small arms and different grenade-launcher systems. Novoluhanske was shelled with automatic grenade launchers.
- 31 December: A Ukrainian soldier was killed in action in the last day of 2021, amid three pro-Russian violations of the truce.
