= POM-3 mine =

Russian anti-personnel mine

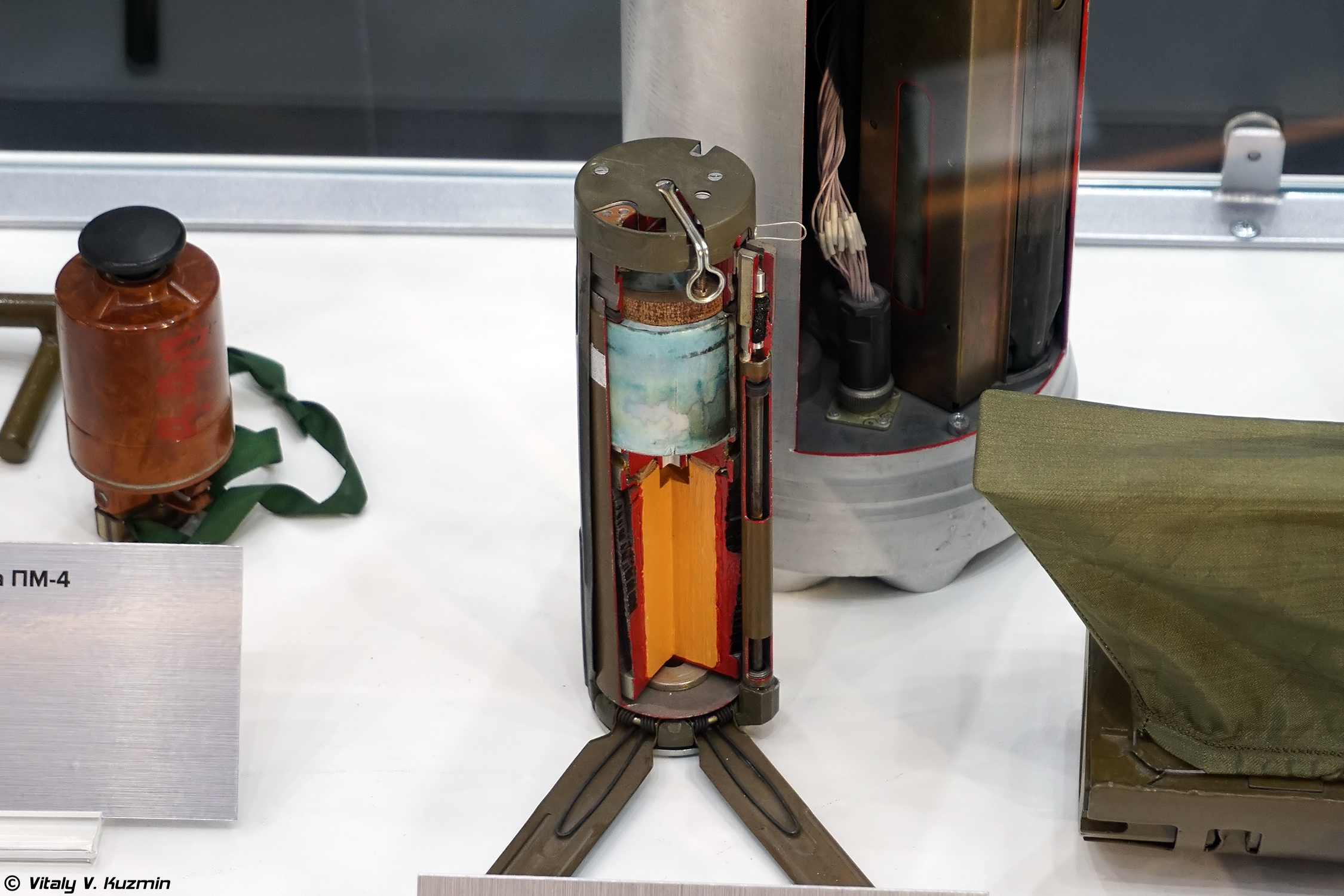
POM-3 mine cross-section.

The POM-3 "Medallion" (ПОМ-3, Russian: Противопехотная Осколочная Мина, lit. 'anti-infantry fragmentation mine') is a Russian bounding anti-personnel mine.

== Design ==
The POM-3 is a scatterable mine of roughly cylindrical shape, able to be deployed from the air or by ground forces. The Russian ISDM Zemledelie mine-laying rocket launcher, in service since 2021, can deploy the mines in a range from 5 to 15 km. Once the mine hits the ground, stabilized by a small parachute, it stands upright on six spring-loaded feet on hard ground, or sticks into the ground if it is soft.

The mine is activated by a seismic sensor forced into the ground. The sensor detects approaching footsteps and activates the mine if it determines that a person is within lethal range (about 16 meters). Upon activation, a fragmentation charge is ejected into the air and explodes. The mine has a self-destruct fuze that detonates the mine 8 or 24 hours after deployment.

The POM-3 weighs 1.3kg and has a shelf-life of 11 years.

== Use in war ==
Human Rights Watch reported in March 2022 that Russian forces in the eastern Kharkiv oblast used POM-3 mines in the Russian invasion of Ukraine. The use of anti-personnel mines is prohibited by the Ottawa Treaty, to which Ukraine, but not Russia, is a party.

== See also ==
- POM-2 mine
