= OMAR Mine Museum =

Museum in Kabul, Afghanistan

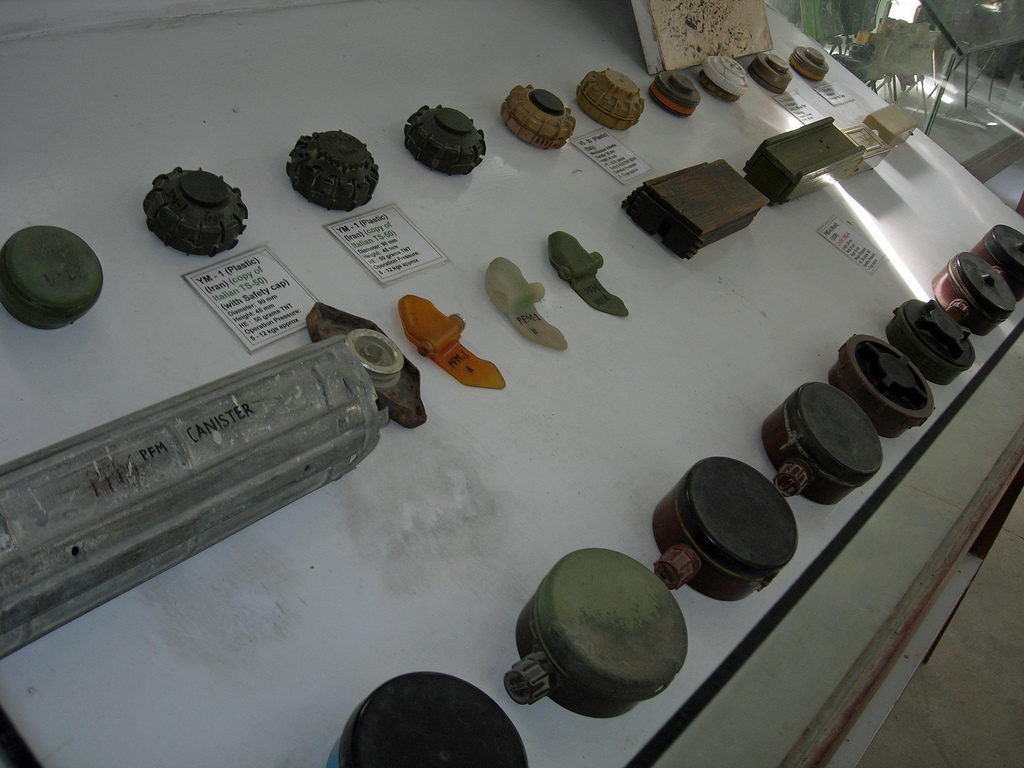
- Mine display
- Location: Kabul, Afghanistan
- Coordinates: 34°33′35″N 69°12′07″E

The OMAR Mine Museum in Kabul, Afghanistan, contains a collection of 51 types of land mines out of the 53 that have been used in that country. OMAR is an acronym for the Organization for Mine Clearance and Afghan Rehabilitation, a group who formed in 1990 with the motto "Clear Mines Save Lives". The museum was founded in 1994, with the aim of educating visitors about the ongoing war in Afghanistan.

== Mine collection ==
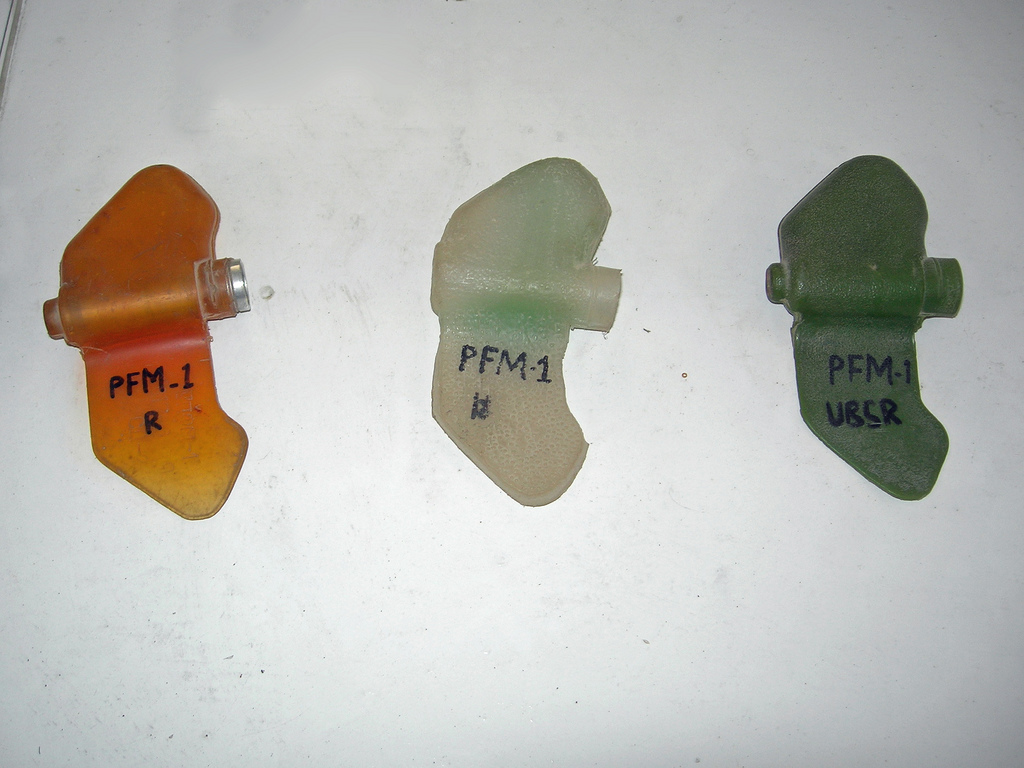
Butterfly mines

The collection includes unexploded ordnance, cluster bombs and airdrop bombs used by the War in Afghanistan. All items in the museum are confirmed to be free from explosives.

The museum educates school groups to detect and avoid unexploded ordnance including landmines and cluster bomblets from historic and ongoing Afghan wars. The museum tells the stories of the lives of those affected by landmines, and features accounts of those involved in clearing unexploded landmines. The organisation also works to educate on safety for those living in areas still affected by unexploded mines.

The museum was seriously damaged in a July 1, 2019 attack.

The museum also displays a variety of other military hardware from wars fought in Afghanistan over the recent decades, including artillery, surface-to-air missiles, and a collection of Soviet military aircraft, many of which were used by the Afghanistan Air Force during the war. Some of these aircraft were damaged during the attack on the museum.

For security reasons, the museum is not open for casual visitors. All appointments must be made through the main OMAR office.

== Aircraft on display ==
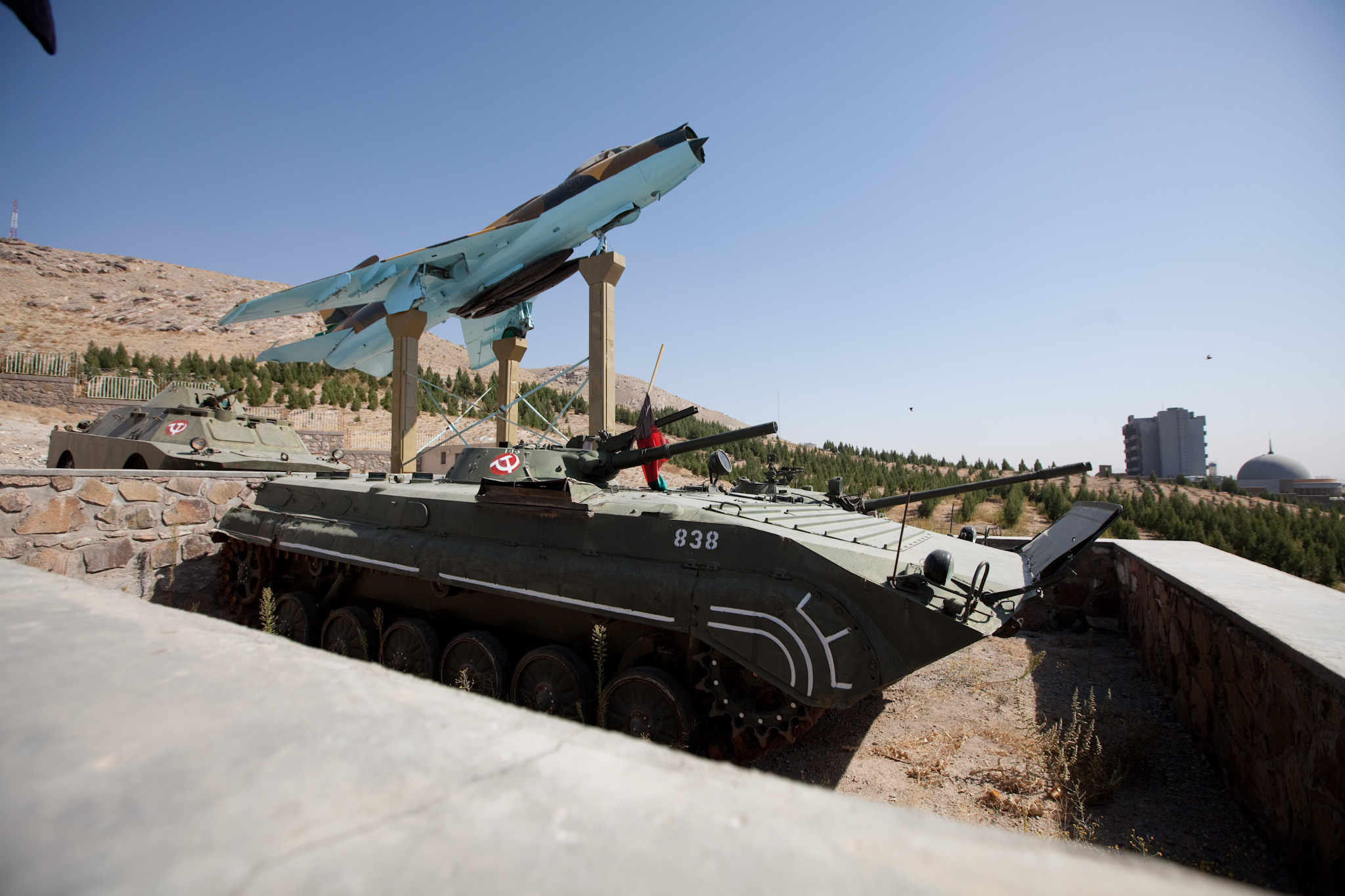
A Sukhoi Su-7 at the OMAR Mine Museum

- Su-7
- Yak-40
- L-39
- Mi-8
- MiG-17
- An-2
- Mi-24
- Yak-11

== Gallery ==
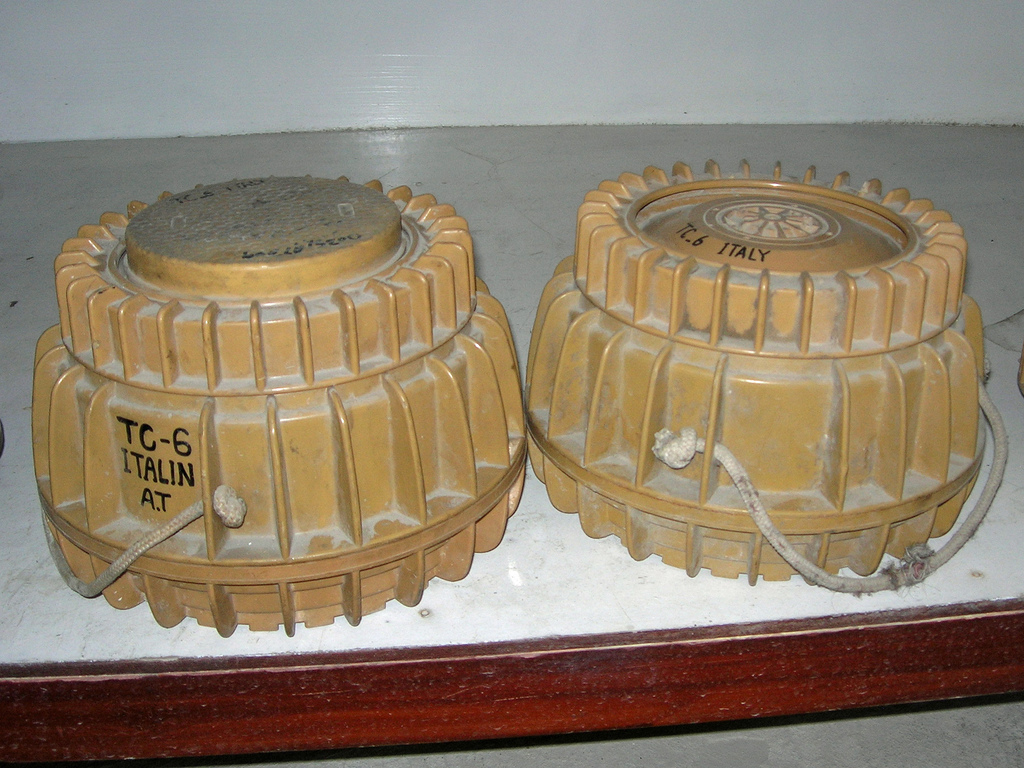
anti-tank mines

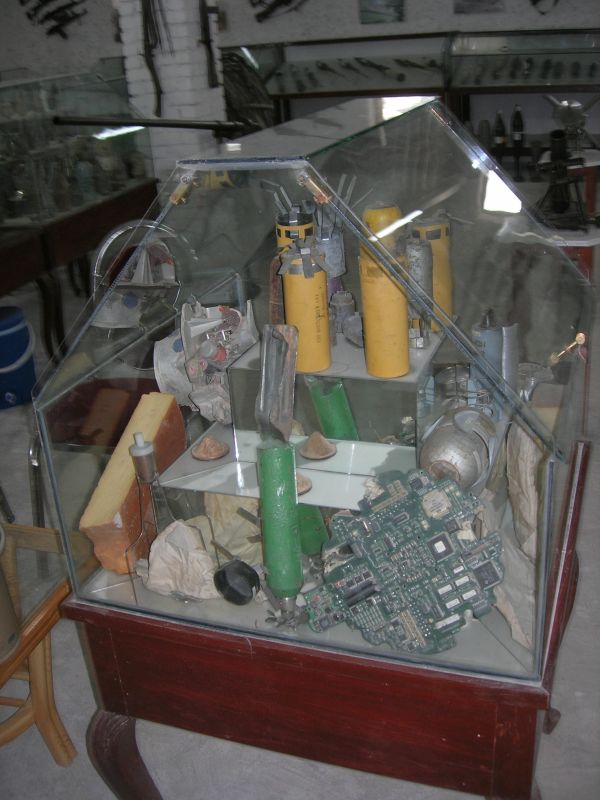
Display at Kabul landmine museum

== See also ==
- List of museums in Afghanistan
