= PTM-3 mine =

Soviet scatterable anti-tank mine

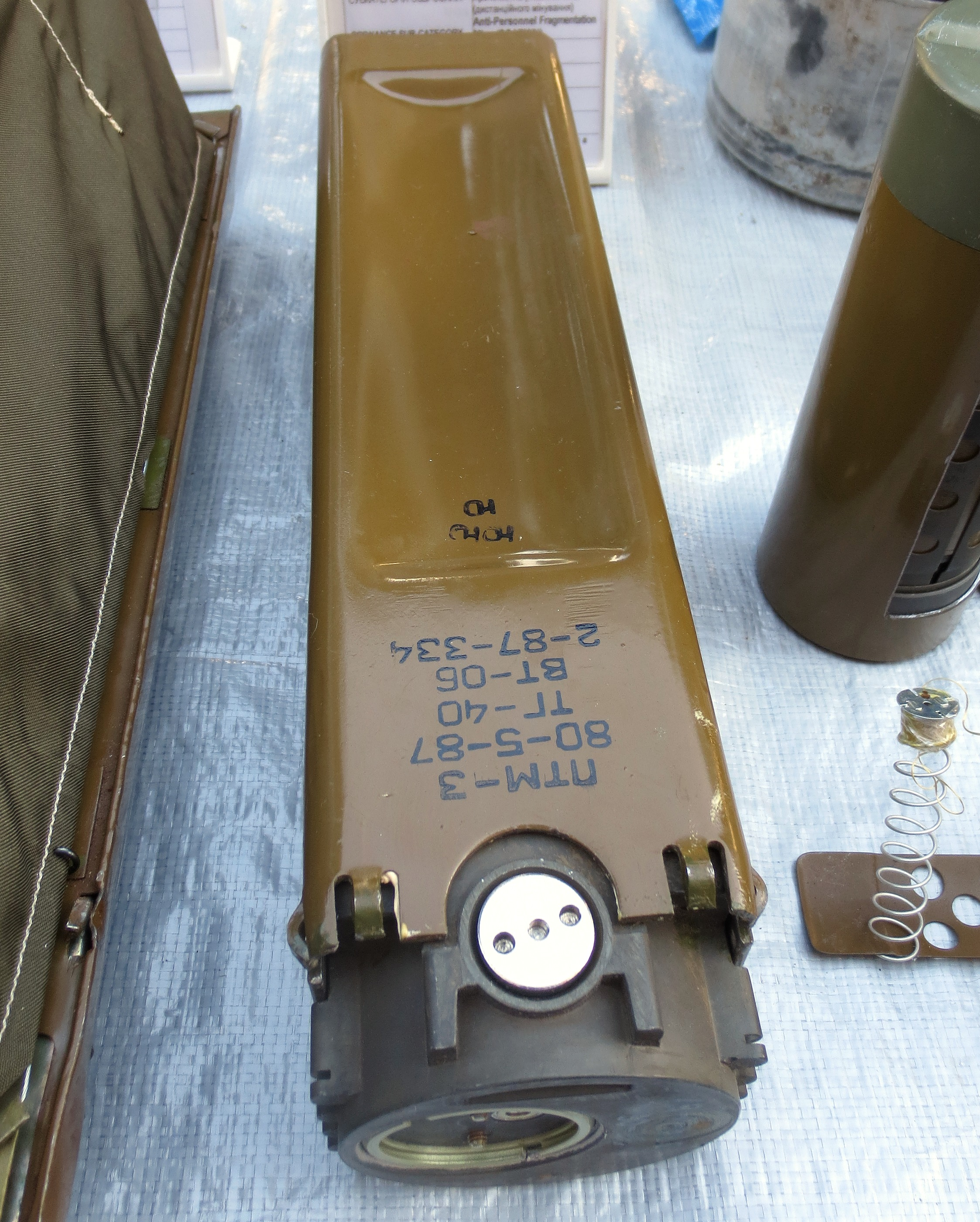
PTM-3

The PTM-3 (Russian: ПТМ-3: ПротивоТанковая Мина-3) is a Soviet scatterable self-liquidating shaped charge anti-tank mine. The mine's case is made up of a stamped steel body with notches in its side. The notches allow the mine to produce a shaped charge effect on five sides - 4 on the sides, and one on the end face. The mine has two arming stages - pyrotechnic and mechanical, and has a magnetic influence battery-powered fuze BT-06 (Russian: БТ-06). The mine can be delivered using the BM-30 Smerch (9M55K4), BM-27 Uragan (9M59), BM-21 Grad (9M22K) MLRS, helicopter-mounted minelaying system VSM-1, remote mining machine UMZ (Russian: УМЗ) or portable mining kit PKM (Russian: ПКМ: Переносной Комплект Минирования). During the Russo-Ukrainian war, the mine has been dropped from Shahed drones. It cannot be placed manually, and must only be placed using remote minelaying systems. The mine was introduced in 1951.

== Action ==
The mine can be deployed on soil with various minelaying systems utilizing KPTM-3 cassettes - each containing one PTM-3 mine. A rope is attached to the body of the cassette and the pin of the mine. Once the cassette bursts, the rope pulls on the pin of the mine, completing the mechanical stage of arming. They can also be deployed by drones.

When on the ground, upon the burnout time of the pyrotechnic moderator has elapsed, the fuze moves into "combat position". The arming process generally takes 60 seconds after the trigger of the thermal sensor.

When an armored vehicle drives over the mine, due to fluctuations in the magnetic field, the mine is triggered. The created shaped charges as a result of the explosion penetrate the tank, and kill the crew inside or damage the tank systems.

Due to its high sensitivity to changes in the magnetic field, the mine may be triggered by individuals, along with vehicles. If no target has been detected, the mine self-destructs after the completion of the self-liquidation period.

== Destruction ==
Installed PTM-3 mines cannot be removed by dislocation. The mines self-destruct 16–24 hours after deployment. If a mine has not self-destructed upon the completion of the set self-liquidation timeframe, it is destroyed using a remotely-triggered explosive charge weighing 0.2-0.4 kg placed next to the mine. It is prohibited to destroy the PTM-3 mines before the self-liquidation period has elapsed, as the placement of the explosive charge could trigger the mine. If the mine must absolutely be removed before the self-liquidation period has elapsed, it can be destroyed by machine gun fire, preferably mounted on an armored vehicle.

== Specifications ==
- Mass
  - Charge: 1.8 kg of TGA-40
  - Deployed: 4.9 kg
  - Full assembly: 8.5 kg
- Dimensions (mm): 330×88×88
- Body: metal
- Fuze: non-contact
- Self-liquidation time (h): 16-24 (depends on weather conditions)
- Temperature range of use (°С): -40 to +50
- Shelf life: 10 years

== See also ==
- PFM-1
- PMN mine
- Anti-tank mine
