= Self-destruct =

Mechanism to cause a device to destroy itself

Self-destruction is a mechanism that can cause an object to destroy itself or render itself inoperable in certain circumstances.

Self-destruct mechanisms are typically found on devices and systems where malfunction could endanger large numbers of people.

== Uses ==
=== Land mines ===
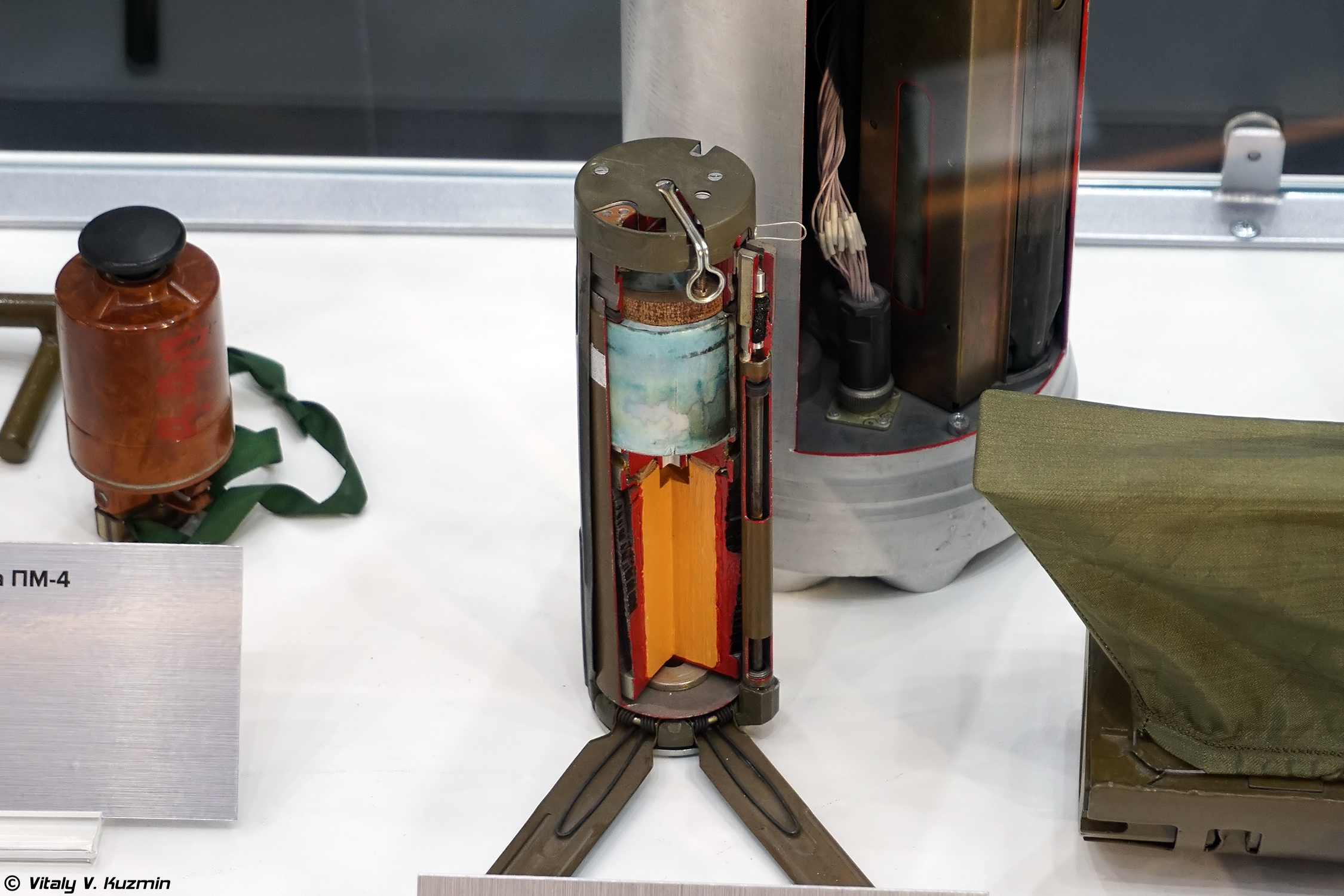
A Russian anti-personnel land mine POM-3 (Russian: Противопехотная Осколочная Мина, lit. 'Infantry shrapnel mine') with a self-deactivation mechanism that disables the mine upon expiration of battery charge.

Some types of modern land mines are designed to self-destruct, or chemically render themselves inert after a period of weeks or months to reduce the likelihood of friendly casualties during the conflict or civilian casualties after the conflict's end. The Amended Protocol II to the Convention on Certain Conventional Weapons (CCW), amended in 1996, requires that anti-personnel land mines deactivate and self-destruct, and sets standards for both. Landmines currently used by the United States military are designed to self-destruct after between 4 hours and 15 days depending upon the type. The landmines have a battery and when the battery dies, the land mine self-destructs. The self-destruct system never failed in over 67,000 tested landmines in a variety of conditions. Not all self-destruct mechanisms are absolutely reliable, and most landmines that have been laid throughout history are not equipped to self-destruct. Landmines can also be designed to self-deactivate, for instance by a battery running out of a charge, but deactivation is considered a different mechanism than self-destruction.

=== Military ships ===
Another form of a self-destruct system can be seen in the naval procedure of scuttling, which is used to destroy a ship or ships to prevent them from being seized and/or reverse engineered.

Generally the scuttling of a ship uses strategically-placed explosive charges by a demolition crew and/or the deliberate cutting open of the hull rather than an in-built self-destruct system.

=== Rockets ===
Launch vehicles self-destruct when they go errant, to prevent the endangerment of nearby ground personnel, spectators, buildings and infrastructure. When a rocket flies outside of a prescribed safety zone, personnel monitoring the launch or onboard computers activate the rocket's flight termination system. This usually detonates explosives mounted on the rocket, which sever its propellant tanks or solid fuel casing, leading to a controlled breakup of the vehicle.

=== Anti-aircraft cannon shells ===
Since anti-aircraft weapons are used in the home front or in the rear of friendly forces anti-aircraft cannon shells are often equipped with self-destruct mechanisms to prevent missed shots from falling down and causing damage to friendly targets. Different self-destruct types exists: in tracer ammunition the burning tracer material can trigger a self-destruct fuse at the end. Other self-destruct types are mechanical where a spring is held back by the centrifugal force of the rotating projectile; as the drag slows down the rotation the force is eventually no longer able to prevent the spring from triggering the self-destruct fuse. Heavy anti-aircraft cannons typically fired time fused shells which did not need a separate self-destruct since they were intended to detonate in the air after a set time.

=== Deep-sea oil drilling ===
A form of self-destruct system can also be observed in deep-sea oil drilling. In the event of an oil well becoming disconnected from its oil rig, a dead man's switch may trigger activation of a blowout preventer blind shear ram, which cuts the drill pipe and permanently seals the well to prevent an oil leak. The oil spill that followed the Deepwater Horizon explosion is an example where the self-destruct system failed to operate correctly (due to the pipe buckling and moving outside of the blind shear ram's reach).

=== Data storage ===
Self-destruct mechanisms are sometimes employed to prevent an apparatus or information from being used by unauthorized persons in the event of loss or capture. For example, they may be found in high-security data storage devices (e.g. IronKey), where it is important for the data to be destroyed to prevent compromise.

Similarly, some online social media platforms are equipped with a Stories feature, where posted content is automatically erased after a predetermined time, commonly 24 hours. This concept has been popularized by Snapchat and later adapted by Instagram and YouTube.

=== Artwork ===
Some artworks may have mechanisms in them to self-destruct in front of many eyes watching. An example is the 2018 painting Love Is in the Bin by Banksy, which shredded itself right after a £1 million auction at Sotheby's London on 5 October 2018. More common are artworks that are designed to be ephemeral, although they take a traditionally permutant form, such as ice sculptures.

== Use in fiction ==
In the 1960s television series The Man from U.N.C.L.E. and Mission: Impossible, sensitive intelligence or equipment is shown to self-destruct in order to prevent it from falling into enemy hands. Notably, the usage of "self-destruct" as a verb is said to have been coined on Mission: Impossible.

Self-destruct mechanisms are frequent plot devices in science fiction stories, such as those in the Star Trek or Alien fictional universes. They are generally found on military installations and starships too valuable to allow an enemy to capture. In many such stories, these mechanisms not only obliterate the object protected by the device, but cause massive destruction in a large surrounding area. Often, the characters have a limited amount of time to escape the destruction, or to disable the mechanism, creating story tension. In some cases, an artificial intelligence will invoke self-destruct due to cognitive dissonance.

Usually the method required to initiate a self-destruct sequence is lengthy and complex, as in Alien, or else requires multiple officers aboard the ship with individual passcodes to concur, while audible and/or visible countdown timers allow audiences to track the growing urgency of the characters' escape. Passwords in 1970s and 1980s movies are often clearly insecure for their purposes as self-destruct triggers, considering accounts with even low-level security—let alone the high-security measures which would come for a self-destruct mechanism—in modern times generally have far more complex password requirements (the writers of the era not anticipating the issues soon to be raised by the easy affordability of fast computer hardware for conducting brute-force attacks).

== See also ==
- Apoptosis
- Autothysis
- Doomsday device
