= PFM-1 mine =

Soviet anti-personnel land mine

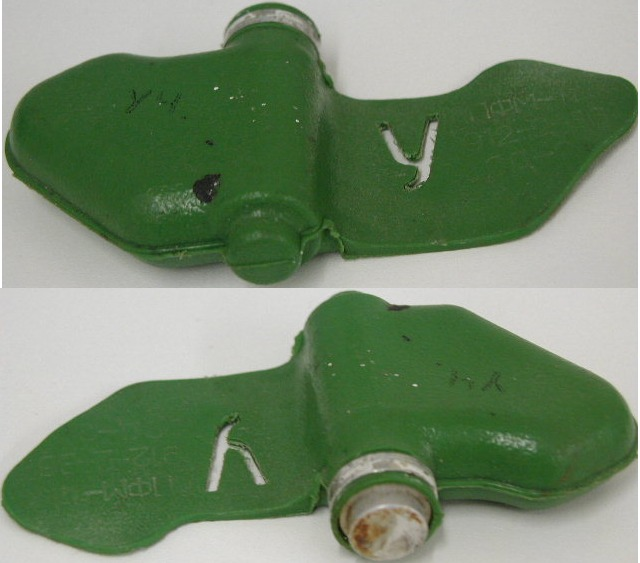
A PFM-1 training mine, distinguishable from the live version by the presence of the Cyrillic letter У (short for учебный, uchebnyy, "for training").

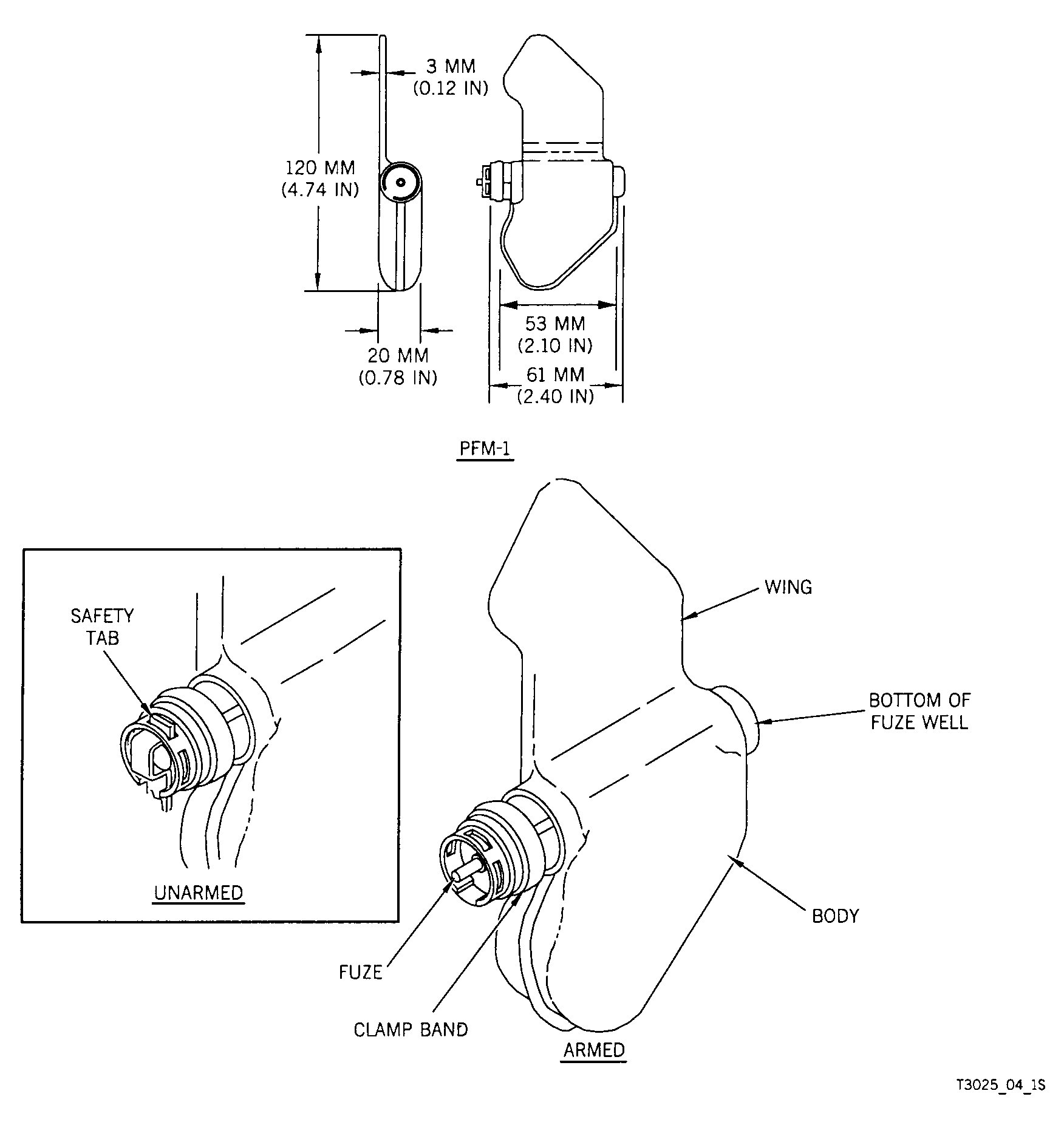
PFM-1 schematic

PFM-1 (Russian: ПФМ-1 — Противопехотная Фугасная Мина-1, lit. 'Anti-infantry high-explosive mine') is a scatterable high explosive anti-personnel land mine of Soviet and Russian production. It is also known as a Flower Petal Mine (Russian: Лепесток), Green Parrot, or Butterfly Mine. The mines can be deployed from mortars, helicopters and airplanes in large numbers; they glide to the ground without exploding and will explode later upon contact.

== Design ==
The mine consists of a polyethylene plastic container containing 37 g (1.3 oz) of VS-6D or VS-60D liquid explosive. The two wings of the PFM-1 allow it to glide after being released in the air, then spin, stabilizing it and slowing its descent, similar to maple seeds. The thick wing contains the liquid explosive. The two wings together are 120 mm (4.7 in) long. The plastic body can be produced in a variety of colours for best camouflage. As existing stocks were in European green rather than sand coloured, the first examples used in 1980s Afghanistan were green and easily visible. This led to their name 'green parrots'.

The shape and bright colour is attractive to children, inspiring criticism that they look like a toy.

The mine comes in two variants: PFM-1 and PFM-1S. The only difference between the two variants is that the PFM-1S comes with a self-destruct mechanism, with a nominal self destruct time for 85% of all mines of 40 hours. The self destruct mechanism is designed to activate after 1– 40 hours depending on ambient temperature. The PFM-1S self-destruct mechanism is not very reliable, and is likely to leave mines in an armed or sensitive state; with mines known to continue to randomly self-destruct for weeks after deployment. The mines cannot be laid manually and must be laid using minelaying systems, such as the remote mining machine UMZ, the portable mining kit - PKM (mortar), and those present on multiple rocket launchers, helicopters (VSM-1 mine system) or airplanes. The remote minelaying systems can only use cluster munitions containing PFM-1 mines. The cassettes that contain the PFM-1 mines are KSF-1 (72 PFM-1), KSF-1S (64 PFM-1S) or KSF-1S-0.5 (36 PFM-1 and 36 PFM-1S).

Because the mine is so light, it can be carried in waterways and move downstream after heavy rains or melting snow. The PFM-1 mines are notorious for attaining good camouflage in the conditions of dense foliage, snow or sand.

== Action ==
The mine is stored with a pin restraining a detonating plunger. Once the arming pin is removed, the plunger is slowly forced forward by a spring until it contacts the detonator, at which point it is armed.

Deformation of the soft plastic skin of the mine forces the arming plunger to strike the detonator, detonating the mine. Because the body of the mine is a single cumulative pressure primer, it is extremely dangerous to handle the mine: The Imperial War Museum states that "A pressure in excess of 5kg would activate the mine". Holding it between the thumb and forefinger may be enough to make it explode. The charge is usually nonlethal, although sufficient to maim.

== Disposal ==
The PFM-1(S) mines can be disposed by destruction or activation by mechanical or explosive means; they cannot be disarmed. The mines are generally disposed of in-situ to prevent unintended initiation while moving. If the mine has to be moved, it is done so with an implement that is at least 3 meters long, made of soft materials (for example, plastic) to prevent injury in the event the mine detonates in transit. The disposal technician should ideally wear suitable personal protective equipment (PPE), including gloves and a helmet with a ballistic visor of at least 8–10 mm of PMMA. If the mine is to be destroyed mechanically, then they should be driven on by the tracks of an armoured vehicle, or impacted with a load weighing at least 60 kg. Otherwise, the technician must dispose of the mine with at least 200 grams of explosive at least 4–5m away. The requirement to use soft materials is due to secondary fragments that may be generated as a result of the mine exploding: if the mine is placed on a hard or metallic surface, such as asphalt or steel, it could generate secondary fragmentation and potentially wound the disposal technician, or people around them. As it is almost impossible to tell the PFM-1 and PFM-1S versions apart care should be taken when approaching them as the mine's self-destruction mechanism may actuate.

== Compliance with the Ottawa Convention ==
In 2017, the government of Belarus announced that it had destroyed its stockpiles of PFM-1 mines. The last 78 PFM-1 mines held by Belarus were destroyed as the highlight of the closing ceremony marking the elimination of their landmine stock.

Ukraine stated that its stockpile of PFM-1 mines in 1999 was 6,000,000 units. In a November 2008 presentation, Ukraine indicated that it had destroyed 101,088 PFM-1 mines per the convention in 1999. Following the agreement between the Cabinet of Ministers of Ukraine and NATO Support and Procurement Agency (NSPA, formerly known as NAMSO) on 1 September 2012, a three-way agreement between Ukraine, NSPA and the EU was signed, which figurated that the EU would provide 3.689 million euros for the destruction of 3.3 million mines. In 2013, the NSPA provided assistance in destruction of 300,000 mines. In 2014, following the outbreak of war with Russia, Ukrainian representatives did not attend in person but submitted a document to the Mine Ban Treaty Third Review Conference, stating that it had destroyed 568,248 mines since the ratification, with an additional 576 mines in 2014, leaving its stockpile at 5,434,672 mines. After failing to meet the Ottawa Treaty deadline of November 2018 on the destruction of its anti-personnel mines, Ukraine requested the deadline be extended to 1 June 2021, later asking for further extension on 8 June 2020. In 2019, 67,236 mines were destroyed. Amid continuing conflict in the Donbas region, in 2020 Ukraine refused to destroy any PFM-1 mines. In 2021, Ukraine's PFM-1 stockpile was reported at 3,363,828 mines.

Russia, as well as the United States, China, and several other countries, are not signatories of the Ottawa Treaty (the Anti-Personnel Mine Ban Convention).

== Military use ==
=== Afghanistan ===
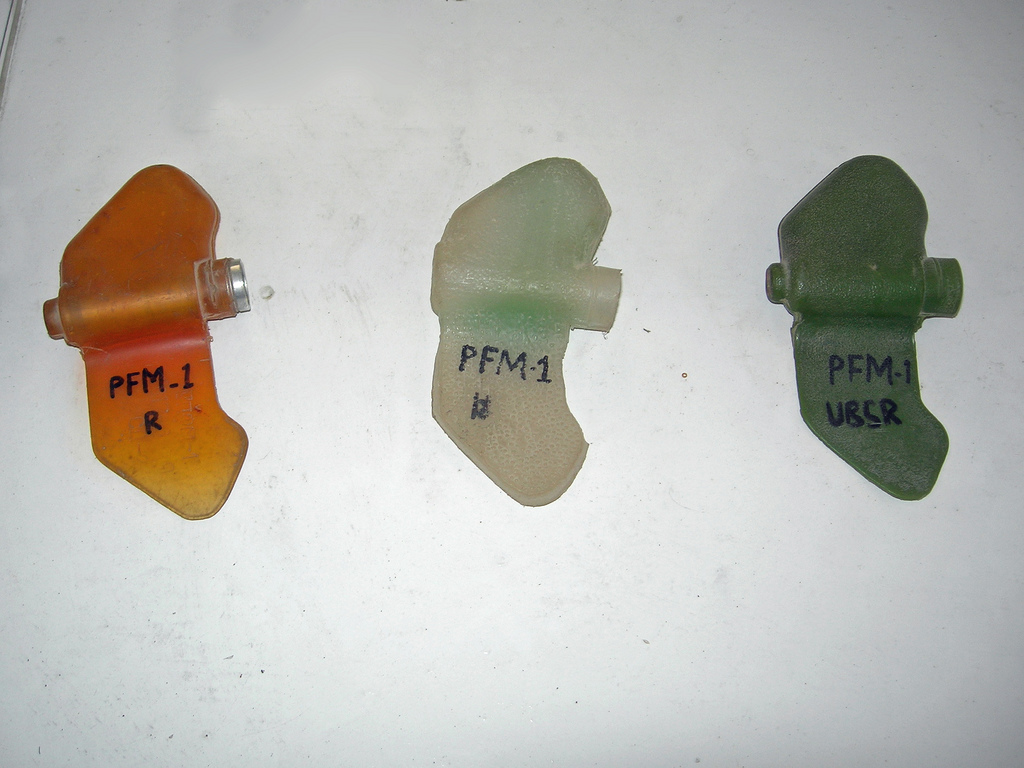
"Butterfly" mines, OMAR Mine Museum, 2008

PFM-1 was used during the Soviet invasion of Afghanistan, allegedly resulting in a high number of casualties among children from the mine being mistaken for a toy due to its shape and coloring.

=== Ukraine ===
The Ukrainian government alleged that the Russian Federation deployed PFM-1 mines during the 2022 Russian invasion of Ukraine. In June, Human Rights Watch (HRW) reported that Russia had used "at least seven types of antipersonnel mines in at least four regions of Ukraine: Donetsk, Kharkiv, Kyiv, and Sumy".

Both Russia (invading forces) and Ukraine (defending force) have widely used the mines, often using tactics such as dropping from heavy lift drones to remotely mine areas.

== Similar weapons ==
The PFM-1 is very similar to the BLU-43 landmine used by the US Army in Operation Igloo White in Laos during the Vietnam War. According to a U.S. military document, the Soviet military created PFM-1 after reverse-engineering BLU-43.

== Specifications (PFM-1 & PFM-1S) ==
- Dimensions: 119 mm × 64 mm × 20 mm (4.69 in × 2.52 in × 0.79 in)
- Activation pressure: 5–25 kg
- Weight:
  - Mine: 80 g (2.8 oz)
  - Charge: 40 g (1.4 oz) of VS-6D(1,5-dichloro-3,3-dimethoxy-2,2,4,4- tetranitropentane)
  - KSF-1 cassette: 9.2 kg (20 lb)
- Shelf life: 10 years
- Temperature range : −20 to 40 °C (−4 to 104 °F)
- Body: polyethylene
- Pressure plate area: 34.1 cm²
- Arming time: 1–10 minutes
- Operational life without self-destruct: up to 1 year
- Demining: not permitted
- Fuze: MVDM/VGM-572 (МВВДМ ВГММ-572)
- Self-destruct time (PKM-1S): 1–40 hours (85% nominal self destruction within 40 hours)

== See also ==
- Ottawa Treaty
- Organization for Mine Clearance and Afghan Rehabilitation
- Atrocity propaganda § Soviet–Afghan War
- PMN mine
- BLU-43 Dragontooth
