= Pyroshock =

Pyroshock, also known as pyrotechnic shock, is the dynamic structural shock that occurs when an explosion or impact occurs on a structure. Davie and Bateman describe it as: "Pyroshock is the response of a structure to high frequency (thousands of hertz), high-magnitude stress waves that propagate throughout the structure as a result of an explosive event such as an explosive charge to separate two stages of a multistage rocket." It is of particular relevance to the defense and aerospace industries in that they utilize many vehicles and/or components that use explosive devices to accomplish mission tasks. Examples include rocket stage separation, missile payload deployment, pilot ejection, automobile airbag inflators, etc. Of significance is the survival and integrity of the equipment after the explosive device has activated so that the vehicle can accomplish its task. There are examples of flight vehicles Boeing-The Aerospace Corp which have crashed after a routine explosive device deployment, the cause of the crash being determined as be a result of a computer failure due to the explosive device. The resultant energies are often high g-force and high frequency which can cause problems for electronic components which have small items with resonant frequencies near those induced by the pyroshock.

== Pyroshock testing & measurement ==
The structural environment is very high magnitude for a relatively short duration and presents many difficulties to capture faithfully. From full scale, high fidelity pre-runs using actual flight hardware, to actual in-flight data, to simulating the event in the test laboratory, there are many possible pitfalls: instrumentation, signal conditioning, amplification, filtration, data acquisition, data sampling, and analysis. In order to verify defense and aerospace vehicle integrity, pyroshock testing is performed in a controlled laboratory environment.

Pyroshock testing can be performed using explosive charges or by high energy short duration mechanical impacts. The acceleration time history of a pyroshock approximates decaying sinusoids. Shock response spectrum (SRS) analysis is used to measure the acceleration as a function of frequency and the total energy of the applied shock pulse. The SRS is a curve that represents the response of many damped single degree-of-freedom oscillators to a shock pulse. The damped oscillators are tuned to specific octave or frequency bands.

"Pyroshock testing techniques first evolved in support of the aerospace community." There are two options for measuring pyroshock. Extreme high frequencies found in pyroshock typically excite the resonant frequency of the accelerometer. As a result, the accelerometer can easily be over ranged or driven nonlinear due to this resonance excitation. In some situations, the frequency environments associated with severe mechanical shock may be so expansive, the acceleration levels so high, or the other directional inputs so severe that successful measurements simply cannot be obtained. There is no single accelerometer design that is optimum for every measurement challenge. A brief summary of each technology is shown below:

1. First, integrated circuit piezoelectric (ICP) accelerometers have a very high signal output, better resolution and the easy of two-wire electrical connections compared to piezoresistive technology. Mechanical isolation of ferroelectric ceramic accelerometers, coupled with an internal 2-pole filter available in an ICP circuit, is allowing piezoelectric accelerometers to operate successfully at higher G-levels than were previously achievable. Good design practices are allowing their elastomeric isolation materials to perform in a dynamically linear fashion within the accelerometers.
2. Piezoresistive MEMS shock accelerometers have low power consumption, a wider operating temperature range, ability to measure to DC, better linearity and transverse sensitivity compared to piezoelectric technology. To control resonance, they incorporate squeeze film damping and over range stops sealed into a hermetic package.
