= Organization for Mine Clearance and Afghan Rehabilitation =

Organization for Mine Clearance and Afghan Rehabilitation (OMAR) is the chief organisation in the awareness and removal of mines in Afghanistan.

== History ==
It was founded in 1990 and initially operated in the western provinces of Afghanistan, it has since branched out to the rest of the country. In 1992, OMAR expanded its operations to mine clearance, hiring and training of over 1,500 deminers in various methods of clearance as well as working with mine detection dogs.

In early 2002 the Mines Advisory Group (MAG) responded to OMAR's request for specialist training necessary to address the new types of UXO being found in Afghanistan following coalition activity in the area.
