= Igor Sakharov =

Russian White émigré and Axis collaborator (1912–1977)

- Игорь Константинович Сахаров
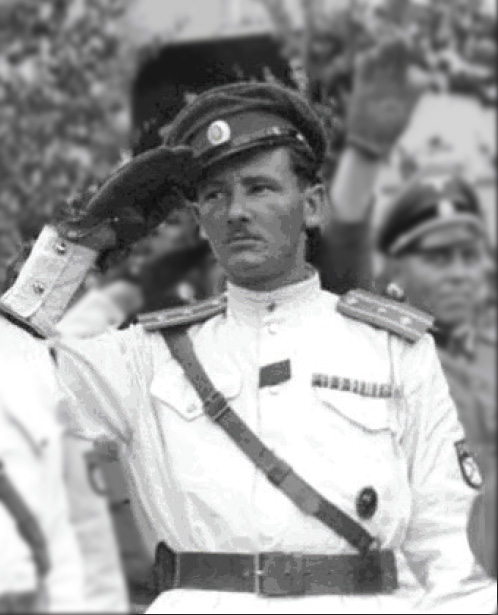
- Sakharov in 1943
- Born: 7 August 1912; Saratov, Russian Empire (now Russian Federation)
- Died: 1977 (aged 64–65); Australia
- Military career
- Allegiance: Argentina; Uruguay; (Taiwan) Republic of China; Nationalist Spain; Nazi Germany; KONR
- Service years: c. 1930 – 1945
- Units: Russian National People's Army; Russian Liberation Army
- Commands: Russian National People's Army
- Conflicts: Spanish Civil War; World War II; Eastern Front; Prague uprising

Igor Konstantinovich Sakharov (Russian: Игорь Константинович Сахаров; 7 August 1912 – 1977) was a Russian émigré and collaborator with Nazi Germany during World War II. A foreign volunteer for the Nationalist faction in the Spanish Civil War, he later became one of the leaders of the collaborationist Russian National People's Army (RNNA) unit. Following the dissolution of the RNNA, he joined the Russian Liberation Army, taking part in the Prague uprising. After the war, he fled to Australia, where he died in a car crash.

== Early life and emigration ==
Igor Konstantinovich Sakharov was born on 7 August 1912 in the city of Saratov. His father was Konstantin Sakharov, a Tsarist general who went on to command White Army forces on the Eastern Front of the Russian Civil War. In 1920, Konstantin fled Russia, and, along with his wife, Igor, and two other children (a son and a daughter), settled in Berlin in 1923.

In the early 1930s, Igor Sakharov participated in military activities around the world, serving in the armies of Uruguay, Argentina, and China.

== Spanish Civil War ==
Following the outbreak of the Spanish Civil War, Sakharov went to fight for the Nationalist faction with the blessing of his father (who used the same icon he had himself been blessed with before fighting in the Russo-Japanese War). In Spain, he joined the Falange Española, and served with distinction, reaching the rank of lieutenant - the highest rank that foreigners could reach in the Nationalist Spanish forces. Following the war, he returned to Berlin, where he lived from 1940 to 1942.

== World War II ==
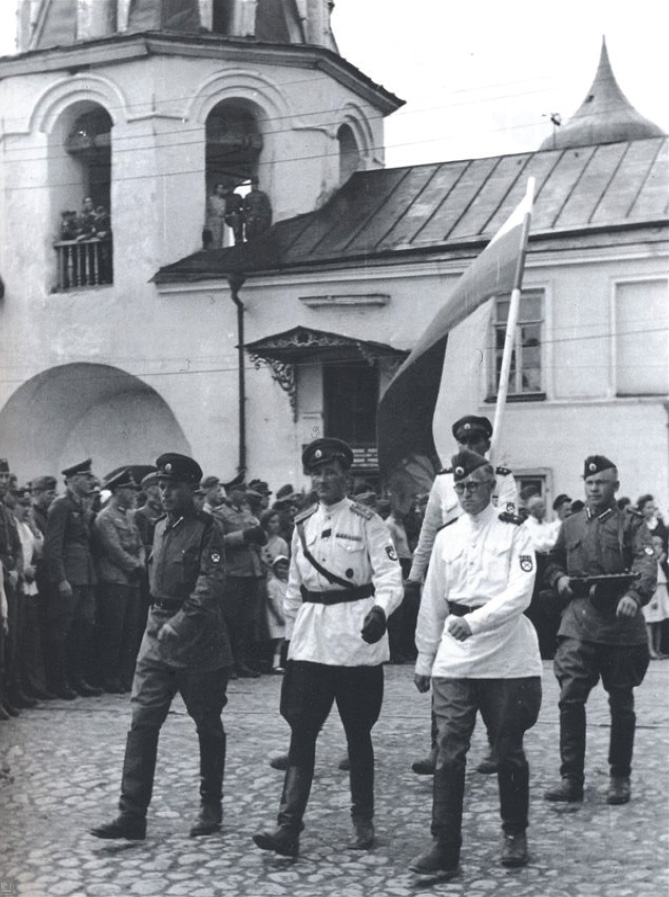
Sakharov (centre) in a July 1943 parade of collaborators in Pskov

According to the memoirs of Russian Liberation Army (ROA) veteran Leonid Samutin, in February 1941 Konstantin Sakharov gave his blessings to his son to fight communism, and bestowed upon him his rank of colonel and all of his military honours.

After the beginning of Operation Barbarossa, Sakharov became part of a German effort to establish a military group composed of Soviet prisoners of war. Together with Sergei Nikitich Ivanov, he travelled to Smolensk to recruit prisoners of war in March 1942. As a result of Sakharov and Ivanov's efforts, the Russian National People's Army (RNNA) was established in the Belarusian village of Asintorf. By late May 1942, he was commander of the RNNA's task force, a group of about 300 militants which engaged in combat with Soviet forces commanded by Pavel Belov. As the year progressed, however, German attitudes towards the RNNA waned. Eventually, in September 1942, field marshal Günther von Kluge recalled Sakharov to Berlin.

In late March 1943, Sakharov and Ivanov travelled to the city of Hlybokaye with the goal of transferring soldiers from the 1st Russian SS Brigade to the RNNA. However, commander of the 1st Russian SS Brigade Vladimir Gil refused to transfer the soldiers, and only some turned to the RNNA. From these troops, the ROA Guards Brigade (which, contrary to its name, was subordinate to the Schutzstaffel) was formed. This began Sakharov's work with the ROA.

=== Russian Liberation Army ===
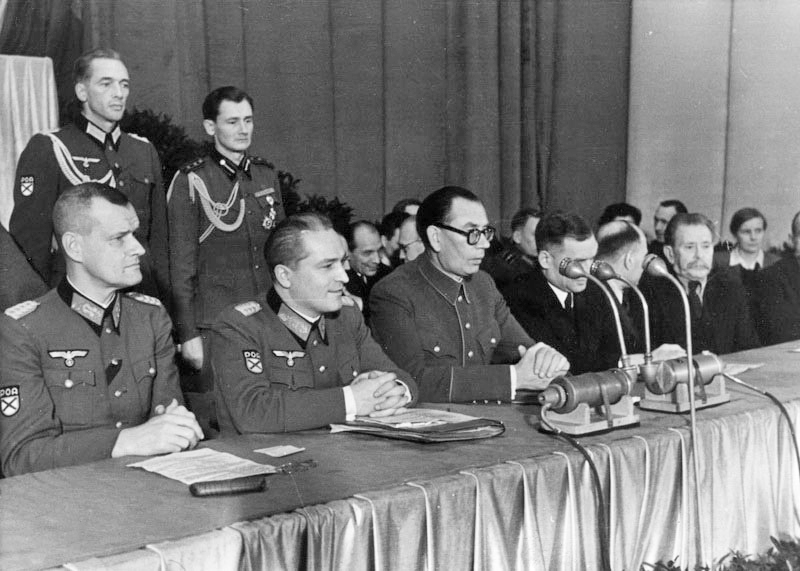
Sakharov (standing, second from left) at a meeting of KONR leaders, November 1944

Sakharov served as deputy commander of the ROA Guards Brigade, with Ivanov being the brigade's commander. He was involved in the training of the brigade's men, and, after Ivanov left the front for Berlin in June 1943, was effectively commander of the brigade, taking part in the capture of three villages which were under the control of Soviet partisans. However, Sakharov himself soon returned to Berlin, and control of the brigade was handed over to Constantine Kromiadi. Sakharov never returned to the brigade, but after its membership was arrested by German authorities in the autumn of 1943, he personally intervened to get them released.

Following his return to Berlin, Sakharov was appointed as an operational adjutant to Andrey Vlasov, then commander of the Committee for the Liberation of the Peoples of Russia (KONR). In this position, Sakharov commanded a tank brigade under KONR, consisting of around 50 men, in January 1945. The next month, he joined the 9th Army in launching successful attacks on Neulewin and Kerstenbruch, German localities held by the Red Army. In a German report, Sakharov's brigade was said to demonstrate "high fighting qualities and outstanding courage," and Sakharov was awarded the Iron Cross for his role, although he had not personally been present at fighting due to having been ill. Sakharov's brigade continued to actively fight the Soviets, including engaging in reconnaissance activities around Schwedt, until the end of February, when it was disbanded.

Sakharov next took over two battalions of the 714th Eastern Infantry Regiment in Denmark. On 10 March 1945, he formed the 1604th Russian Infantry Regiment from these battalions, subordinating the regiment to the 3rd Panzer Army. The regiment participated in combat in the Harz mountain range. On 9 April 1945, the regiment left the front and became part of the 600th Infantry Division under Sergei Bunyachenko, returning to the front in Frankfurt an der Oder. On 27 April 1945, Sakharov participated in a meeting of the division's commanders in Schneeberg, Saxony, where it was determined to travel south to Linz to link up with the remainder of KONR.

=== Prague uprising and end of the war ===
On 5 May 1945, Sakharov, alongside Bunyachenko, had begun making agreements with Czechoslovak forces to support each other in a rebellion against the Germans in Prague. Sakharov's regiment followed the 3rd Regiment and entered Prague before reaching Smíchov and splitting the city along the Vltava. Sakharov then pushed north from the Vltava, coming into contact with German forces around Strahov Monastery. On 7 May 1945, after Sakharov's forces had taken Petřín, a group of American war reporters arrived at the headquarters of his regiment, where they informed him that the United States Third Army of George S. Patton would not be pushing into Prague and that the city would instead be taken by the Soviet forces. Upon hearing this, Sakharov immediately informed Bunyachenko, who ordered him to withdraw his regiment to the village of Suchomasty.

On 9 May 1945, he began moving towards Plzeň with his regiment. Three days later, he was ordered by Bunyachenko to stand down as the division had been disbanded. Sakharov subsequently fled to the American occupation zone in Germany, where he avoided repatriation to the Soviet Union.

== Later life and death ==
Following the war's end, Sakharov moved to the French occupation zone in Germany, where he actively participated in hiding escaped war criminals, helped fellow former collaborators escape repatriation, and was a leader among former ROA officers in occupied Germany. In one instance, he barricaded himself in a displaced persons camp where he raised the black flag to indicate the presence of a contagious disease in the camp in a successful effort to ward off Soviet soldiers seeking the repatriation of former collaborators.

In autumn 1946 Sakharov moved to Füssen along with a group of displaced persons. The next year, he moved to the Schleichsheim displaced persons camp, near Munich. He was a leading organiser of early post-war political activity among émigrés, founding the Saint Andrew's Flag Union and serving as a member of its Military-Political Council and Main Directorate. He also founded the Council of United Vlasovites in August 1950.

At some time in the 1950s, Sakharov emigrated to Australia, where he lived until he died in a car crash in 1977.
