= Russian National People's Army =

Military unit

- Русская национальная народная армия
- Chevron of the RNNA
- Active: 1942 – 1943
- Allegiance: Germany
- Branch: Heer (Wehrmacht)
- Type: Infantry
- Size: 4,000 troops
- Garrison/HQ: Asintorf
- Engagements: World War II; Battle of Velikiye Luki

Commanders
- Notable commanders: Igor Sakharov; Sergei Nikitich Ivanov; Vladimir Boyarsky

The Russian National People's Army (German: Russische Nationale Volksarmee, Russian: Русская национальная народная армия, romanized: Russkaya natsional'naya narodnaya armiya), abbreviated RNNA, was a Nazi German collaborationist military unit during World War II, led primarily by Russian émigrés with ties to American-based Russian fascist Anastasy Vonsiatsky.

== Name ==
The Russian National People's Army, as it was called by its leaders, was known by several names during its existence. Though their chevrons and officially-produced material referred to them as such, German documents referred to them by two alternatively-used names; Sonderverband Graukopf ("Special Group Grey Head") and Russisches Bataillon z.b.V. (Special-Purpose Russian Battalion).

== History ==
The proposal to create the Russian National People's Army was first proposed by émigré Sergei Nikitich Ivanov (a representative of Anastasy Vonsiatsky with ties to the Wehrmacht and Nazi Party) in Berlin. The proposal was supported by a number of high-ranking Wehrmacht officers, among them generals Max von Schenckendorff, Hellmuth Stieff, and Claus von Stauffenberg. The idea proliferated throughout the Oberkommando der Wehrmacht as a way to compensate for the losses of German troops on the Eastern Front.

In March 1942, Ivanov met with Field Marshal Günther von Kluge, and received permission to form a Russian military unit from Soviet prisoners of war in Barysaw, Smolensk, Roslavl, and Vyazma. The Abwehr also soon took interest in the RNNA, and wanted to use the unit's personnel not simply to fight Soviet partisans in the rear of the German troops, but also to deploy the RNNA behind personnel as saboteurs in Soviet-held territory.

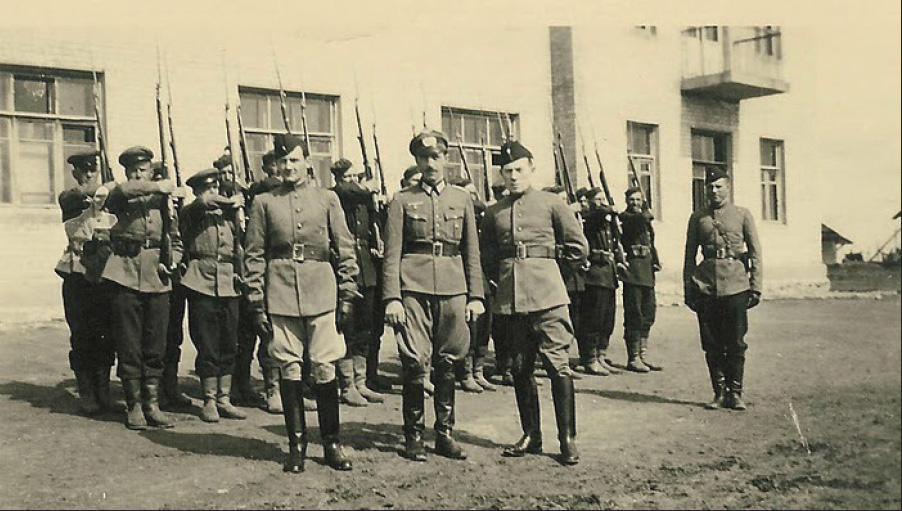
The RNNA in Asintorf, 1942.

The RNNA was formed in the village of Asintorf, Belarus, 35 kilometres north of Orsha, the RNNA's headquarters. Ivanov was head of the unit, while Igor Sakharov was appointed as Ivanov's adjutant. Constantine Kromiadi was made commandant of the central headquarters.

Initially, the RNNA's leadership sought only to recruit anti-communists from the prisoners of war, but later began to accept everyone. In March 1942, the strength of the RNNA was 150 people, and by May had reached a size of 400. To increase the RNNA's appeal to prisoners of war, Ivanov proposed the appointment of a Soviet military commander who was "well-known and respected among the military personnel", offering the position to Mikhail Fyodorovich Lukin. However, Lukin refused to join the RNNA.

In addition to combat training, dissemination of propaganda to personnel was carried out. The RNNA's leadership told soldiers that their task was, "the fight against Bolshevism and Jewry for the creation of a new Russian state and the restoration of the pre-revolutionary system." According to information from Soviet partisans at the time, up to 40% of RNNA personnel believed this.

From the time they were first noticed, the RNNA became the object of close attention of the Soviet partisans. In the first period, contacts were limited to agitation, but partisans managed to get intelligence from those who served in the RNNA, as well as smuggling military equipment from the RNNA over to partisan lines.

The RNNA was beset by constant defections to Soviet partisans. In only a three-day period in August 1942, roughly 200 RNNA soldiers defected to Soviet partisans. Only the 3rd Battalion of the RNNA, located in Byerazino, did not suffer from such issues.

On 1 September 1942, Vladimir Boyarsky was appointed head of the RNNA, and shortly after, the training of the 4th and 5th battalions of the RNNA began. However, only a month later, the organisation was taken over by the Germans directly, with Boyarsky and Georgy Zhilenkov, head of the propaganda department of the RNNA, both being taken prisoner.

By 1943, the RNNA had ceased to exist. Its forces were transferred to the Western Front. Following the creation of the Russian Liberation Army, some personnel of the RNNA (among them Zhilenkov and Kromiadi) joined it.

== See also ==
- Collaboration in the German-occupied Soviet Union
- Committee for the Liberation of the Peoples of Russia
- Russian Liberation Army
- Russian Liberation Movement
