= Maloianysol =

Maloianysol Малоянисоль
- Village
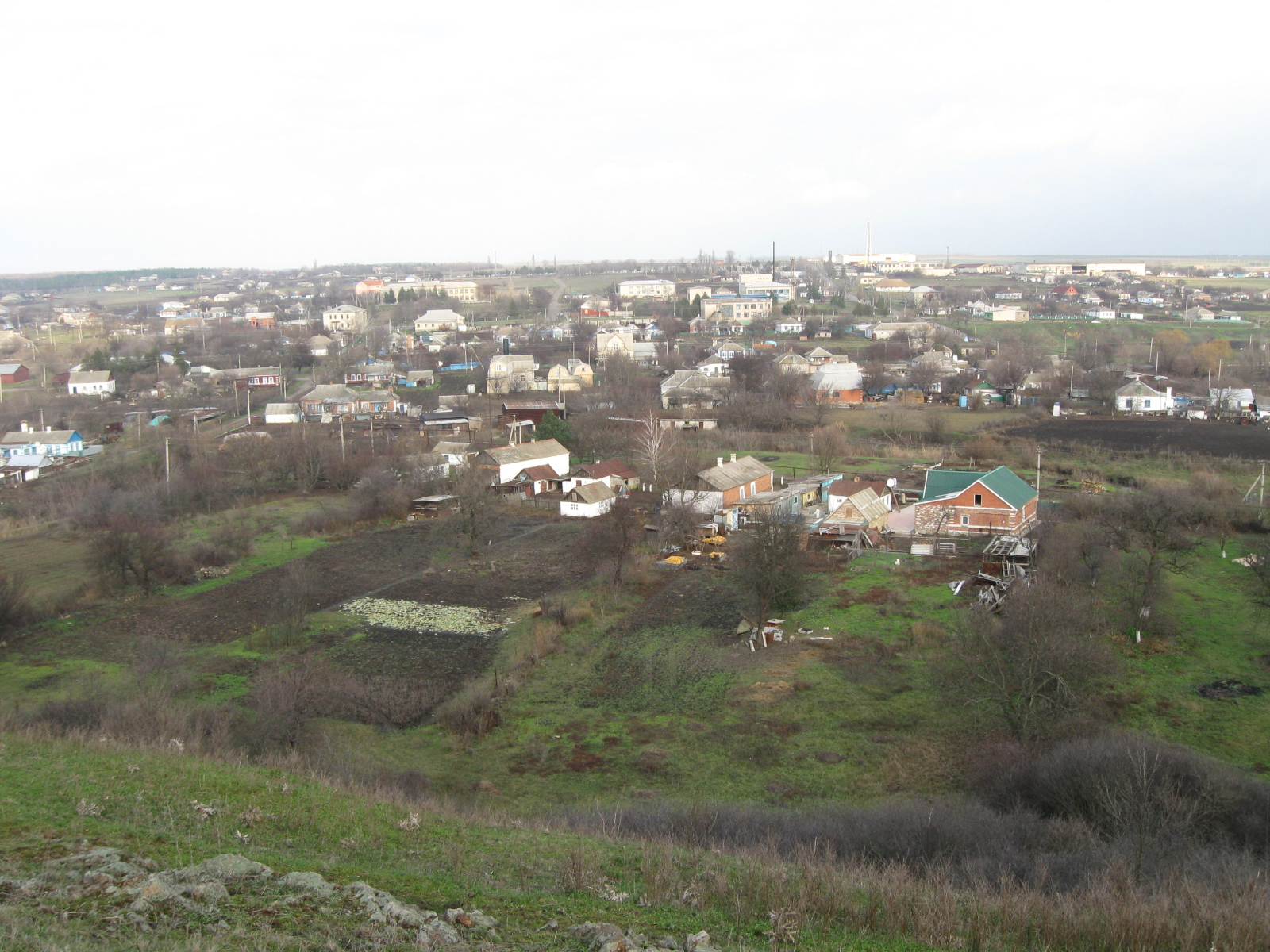

- Location within Donetsk Oblast Location within Ukraine
- Coordinates: 47°22′17″N 37°20′09″E
- Country: Ukraine
- Oblast: Donetsk Oblast
- Raion: Mariupol Raion
- Hromada: Kalchyk rural hromada
- Founded: 1780

Population (2016)
  - Total: 1,968
- Time zone: UTC+2 (EET)
  - Summer (DST): UTC+3 (EEST)

Maloianysol (Ukrainian: Малоянисоль; Russian: Малоянисоль, romanized: Maloyanisol), known from 1956 to 1995 as Kuibysheve (Ukrainian: Куйбишеве) is a village in Kalchyk rural hromada, Mariupol Raion, Donetsk Oblast, Ukraine.

== Geography ==
Maloianysol is located in the Kalchyk river valley. The Kalchyk is a tributary of the Kalmius river that flows into the Azov Sea. Maloianysol is located 40 kilometres (25 mi) from Mariupol.

== History ==
The historic name of the village is Maloianysol. The "-ianysol" part of the name is derived from the Urum language of the Ukrainian Greek settlers that founded the village in 1780 after emigrating from Crimea in 1778. The specific Urum term is Yeni-Sala (Єні-Сала), where yeni means 'new' and sala means 'village'.

In 1886, Maloianysol had a population of 3778 people.

During the Russian Civil War that took place between 1917 and 1923, Maloianysol changed hands several times between the opposing forces. Eventually, it fell under stable control of the Bolsheviks, who established the communist Soviet Union on much of the former territory of the Russian Empire. During World War II, Maloianysol was occupied by Nazi Germany between October 1941 and September 1943. In 1956, Maloianysol was renamed Kuibysheve by the Soviet government after Russian revolutionary Valerian Kuybyshev.

In 1995, the Verkhovna Rada of independent Ukraine restored the historic name Maloianysol.

During the Russian invasion of Ukraine that began in 2022, Maloianysol was captured by the Russian military. According to exiled Mariupol mayoral advisor Petro Andriushchenko, a Russian ammunition depot in the village was blown up on 16 March 2023. He cited local eyewitness reports, and accompanied the announcement with a video.

== Demographics ==
Population history
Year	Pop.	±% p.a.
1886	3,778	—
2001	2,355	−0.41%
2016	1,968	−1.19%

According to the 2001 Ukrainian census, the village had a population of 2355 people. When asked about their ethnic background, 74% reported Greek ethnicity, 14% reported Russian ethnicity, and 8% reported Ukrainian ethnicity. 5.31% reported their native language as Ukrainian, 94.35% reported Russian, 0.08% Greek (including Mariupol Greek and Urum), and 0.04% Armenian, Belarusian and Gagauz.

== Notable people ==
- Georgis Kostoprav (1903–1938), Greek Ukrainian poet
