= Greek Operation =

Mass persecution of Greeks in the Soviet Union

Greek Operation of the NKVD
- Part of National operations of the NKVD, the deportations of Soviet Greeks, and the Great Purge
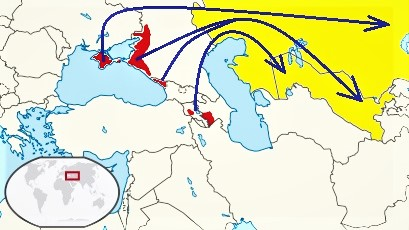
- Deportation of Greeks in the USSR.
- Location: Soviet Union (modern-day Russia, Ukraine, Georgia, Kazakhstan and others)
- Date: 1937–1950
- Target: Ethnic Greeks in the Soviet Union
- Attack type: Prison shootings, deportation
- Deaths: 15,000–50,000
- Perpetrators: NKVD security forces Joseph Stalin

The Greek Operation (Note: In Greece, Grecheskaya Operatsiya is also known with the transliteration Gretseskayia Operatsia as that is how it was printed in various publications. In Greek, it is known as Ελληνική Επιχείρηση, which means "Greek Operation".) (Russian: Греческая Операция, romanized: Grecheskaya Operatsiya; Ukrainian: Грецька Операція, romanized: Hretska Operatsiia; Greek: Ελληνική επιχείρηση) was an organised mass persecution of the Greeks of the Soviet Union that was ordered by Soviet leader Joseph Stalin, primarily motivated by widespread distrust of Greek populations living in the Black Sea Region and also for the availability of resources. Greeks often use the term "pogrom" (πογκρόμ) for this persecution. It began on December 15, 1937, and marked the beginning of the repressions against Greeks that went on for 13 years. Depending on the sources, it is estimated that between 15,000 and 50,000 Greeks died during this campaign. Tens of thousands more were persecuted during the Deportation of the Soviet Greeks. Some scholars characterize the operation as a "genocide" against Greeks.

A wave of Greek emigrants from the Soviet Union in 1937–1939 is often considered a consequence of Stalinist persecution of the Soviet Greek national movement.

== Motivations for deportation ==
The Greeks living within the USSR had a history of maintaining close ties with outside powers, such as the Ottoman Empire leading up to the outbreak of WWI. Such close ties made Soviet authorities wary of the loyalty of their Greek subjects. The Greeks held particularly close ties with Greece and with the Greek Orthodox Church. Soviet authorities in particular "viewed religion as a force that undermined its power and authority".

Strategically, the Greeks were viewed as a security threat by the Soviets. Worries over a nationalist uprising or saboteur activity were only heightened by the resistance shown by Greek partisans in response to the German invasion of their country. Post WWII, the entry of Greece into the NATO alliance further drove Stalin's distrust of the Soviet Greek community, fearing they had come under the influence of the West. Soviet authorities viewed Greeks as a "foreign element" to the region that was "hostile" and "unreliable" to Soviet rule. Their removal, it was thought, would solidify Soviet hegemony in the Black Sea and Georgian regions. Population transfer was Soviet policy at the time when it came to weakening nationalistic or ethnic sentiments in potentially “problematic” populations. Resettlement was often carried out regardless of whether or not different ethnic groups were resistant to Soviet rule. The Chechen, Ingush, Crimean Tatar, and other minority communities around the Black Sea also faced similar accusations of disloyalty from Soviet authorities. Soviet doctrine at the time pushed for the formation of an egalitarian society in addition to an ethnically homogenous one. As a result, extensive efforts were made to fill the newly established collective farms popping up all across Soviet territory. This contrasted directly with the long history the Greeks had of independent farming practices, and as a result, the Greek community was viewed as resistant and a hindrance to state control.

Other motivators include gaining control over resources and land populated by the Greeks, who primarily reside around the Black Sea. The Soviet Union saw the deportation of the Greeks and other minorities in this area as a way to safeguard important agricultural and mineral resources along with oil reserves for the Soviet economy.

== History ==
The 1926 Soviet census registered 213,765 Greeks in the country and the 1939 census recorded 286,444. On 9 August 1937, NKVD order 00485 was adopted to target "subversive activities of Polish intelligence" in the Soviet Union, but was later expanded to also include Latvians, Germans, Estonians, Finns, Greeks, Iranians and Chinese. This was followed by Directive No. 50215 on 11 December 1937, to take effect on 15 December 1937, signed by the NKVD Commisar, Nikolai Yezhov. Directive 50215 declared that an investigation established "that Greek intelligence is actively conducting espionage, sabotage, and rebellious work in the USSR, carrying out assignments from British, German, and Japanese intelligence," and that "In order to suppress the activities of Greek intelligence in the territory of the USSR, I order [that] on December 15 of this year, simultaneously in all republics, territories and regions, arrests are to be made of all Greeks suspected of espionage, sabotage, rebel and nationalist anti-Soviet work."

The persecution of Greeks in USSR was gradual: at first, the authorities shut down the Greek schools, cultural centers, theatres and publishing houses. Then, the secret police indiscriminately arrested all Greek men aged 16 years old or older. Greeks who were wealthy or self-employed professionals were targeted first.

On many occasions, the central authorities sent telegrams to police forces with orders to arrest a certain number of Greeks, without giving any individual names, and the police officers would arrest at random any persons of Greek origin until they reached the requested total number of arrests until the process was repeated at a later date. Estimates of the number of victims vary: according to Ivan Dzhukha 15,000 were executed and 20,000 were deported to Gulags, while Vlasis Agtzidis puts the number of deaths to 50,000.

According to Greek Marxist historian Anastasis Gkikas the Greek Operation of the NKVD came as a response to counter-revolutionary activities of a portion of the ethnic Greek population. Gkikas claims that anti-Soviet resistance organizations had coordinated their actions with Metaxist societies in Greece and sought to create an autonomous Greek state in the Black Sea region. They engaged in wrecking, illegally accumulated foreign currency and launched a series of small scale uprisings between 1929 and 1931. Gkikas further claims that the number of Greeks deported to Gulags by 1942 did not exceed 2,610 people.

In reality, there was virtually no widespread counter-revolutionary activity among the Soviet Greeks, though there were very few exceptions, such as Constantine Kromiadi, an anti-communist of Greek origin, who later became second in command in Andrey Vlasov's Abwehr detachment during the Nazi German occupation of the Soviet Union in World War II.

== Axis collaboration ==
About one thousand Greeks from Greece and more from the Soviet Union, presumably motivated by their ethnic persecution from Soviet authorities, joined the Waffen-SS, mostly in Ukrainian divisions. A special case was that of the Ukrainian-Greek Sevastianos Foulidis, an anti-communist who had been recruited by the Abwehr as early as 1938 and became an official of the Wehrmacht, with extensive action in intelligence and agitation work on the Eastern front.

== Aftermath ==
The effects of Soviet forced deportation were extensive on the Greek community. The trauma alone of being uprooted from one's home, way of life, and culture corroded centuries of tradition and language, the loss of which is still seen to this day. Many lost their homes, businesses, and possessions alone in the various waves of resettlements, not to mention the loss of life from executions, disease, starvation, and exhaustion among the other harsh conditions in the camps. An exact figure of the number of Greeks killed is virtually impossible, although it's estimated that 19% of all those arrested in the Soviet Union between 1937 and 1938 were executed. Following Stalin's death, the practice of forced resettlement was abandoned, although rehabilitation was tough for many Greeks returning to a region that completely changed in their absence.

== Remembrance ==
In 1938, 20,000 Soviet Greeks arrived in Greece. Between 1965 and 1975, another 15,000 Greeks emigrated from the Soviet Union and went to Greece. A monument to all Greek victims of the Gulag was unveiled in Magadan in 2011. Unlike many other "punished" ethnic groups, the Soviet Greeks were not officially rehabilitated by Soviet legislation. In the early 1990s, a movement arose advocating the creation of a new Greek autonomy in the Krasnodar region, but it failed to achieve support. One Soviet Greek man, born in 1959, described this outcome with the following words:

When these Greek societies started emerging, I told the lads that there was a society that was reviving us, the Pontic Greeks. Do you know what their answer was? They said, that if such societies were organised then we would have to expect a repetition of 1937. So many Greeks were deported then.

Soviet Greeks were officially rehabilitated, among with other ethnic groups by the Russian Federation, amended by Decree no. 458 of September 12, 2015.

== See also ==
- Deportation of the Soviet Greeks
- Constantine Kromiadi
- Greek Autonomous District
- Konstantin Chelpan
- Georgis Kostoprav

== Sources ==
- Agtzidis V (1991). "The Persecution of Pontic Greeks in the Soviet Union". Journal of Refugee Studies. 4 (4): 372–381. doi:10.1093/jrs/4.4.372.
- Bugay N (1996). The Deportation of Peoples in the Soviet Union. New York City: Nova Publishers. ISBN 978-1-56072-371-4. OCLC 36402865.
- Gkikas A (2007). Οι Έλληνες στη διαδικασία οικοδόμησης του σοσιαλισμού στην ΕΣΣΔ [Greek Participation in the Building of Socialism in USSR] (in Greek). Athens: Syghxroni Epoxi. ISBN 978-960-451-056-6.
- Kaya B (2002). The Changing Face of Europe: Population Flows in the 20th Century. Council of Europe. ISBN 978-92-871-4790-5. LCCN 2007397168.
- Kubiiovych V, Struk DH (1984). Encyclopedia of Ukraine, Volume 2 (revised ed.). University of Toronto Press.
- Marshall A (2010). The Caucasus Under Soviet Rule. Routledge. ISBN 978-1-136-93825-2. LCCN 2010003007.
- Olson JS, Pappas LB, Pappas NC (1994). An Ethnohistorical Dictionary of the Russian and Soviet Empires. Westport, Conn.: Greenwood Publishing Group. ISBN 978-0-313-27497-8.
- Photiades K (1999). Ο ελληνισμός της Ρωσίας και της Σοβιετικής Ένωσης [The Hellenism of Russia and the Soviet Union] (in Greek). Ekdoseis Irodotos. ISBN 978-960-7290-66-3.
- Popov A (2016). Culture, Ethnicity and Migration After Communism: The Pontic Greeks. Routledge. ISBN 978-1-317-15580-5.
- Rummel RJ (1997). Death by Government. Transaction Publishers. ISBN 978-1-56000-927-6.
- Thomas N (2015). Hitler's Russian & Cossack Allies 1941–45. Bloomsbury Publishing. ISBN 978-1-4728-0688-8.
- Voutira E (2011). The 'Right to Return' and the Meaning of 'Home': A Post-Soviet Greek Diaspora Becoming European?. LIT Verlag Münster. ISBN 978-3-643-90107-1.
