= Vladimir Boyarsky =

Red Army officer and Nazi collaborator

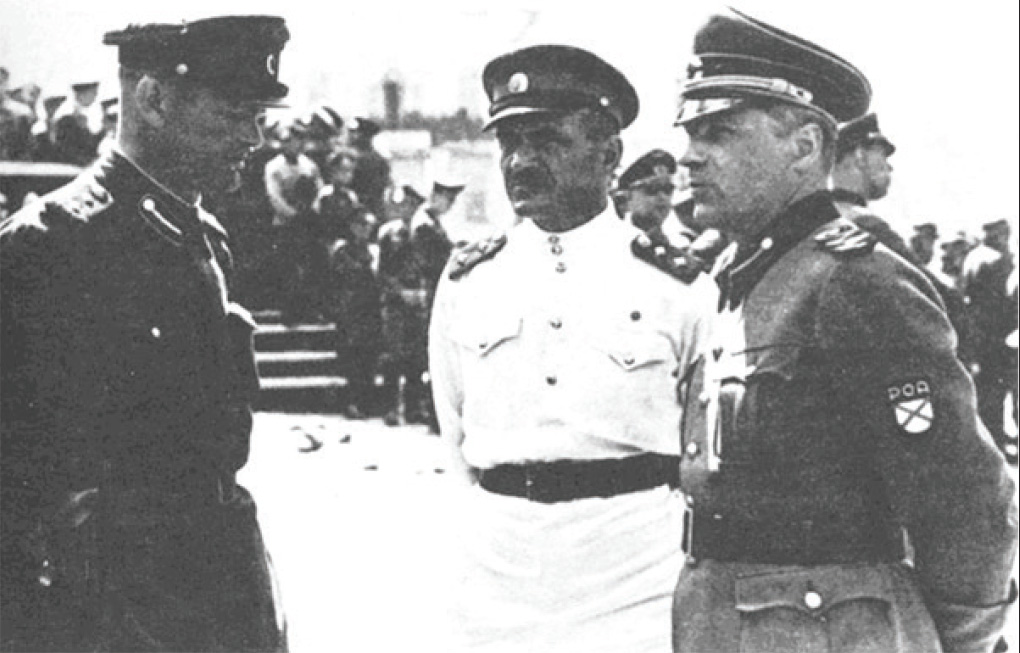
ROA servicemen Colonel V. Boyarsky, Colonel K. G. Kromiadi and General G. N. Zhilenkov. Pskov, 1943

Vladimir Ilyich Boyarsky (Russian: Влади́мир Ильи́ч Боя́рский; Ukrainian: Володи́мир Іллі́ч Боя́рський; Polish: Włodzimierz Bajerski; 10 December 1901 – 7 May 1945, Příbram) was a Red Army officer who became a collaborator with Nazi Germany during World War II, serving in Andrey Vlasov's Russian Liberation Army.

== Early life and education ==
Boyarsky was born on 10 December 1901 in Berdetskoye, Kiev Governorate, Russian Empire. Born into a Polish family, Boyarsky graduated from an economic institute in 1926. He received a military education at the Frunze Military Academy in 1937.

== History of service ==
- Served in the 111th Rifle Regiment of the 37th Rifle Division
- 1928–1929 – adjutant of a battalion commander.
- 1929–1930 – Battalion commander
- January–July 1930 – Adjutant of a division chief of staff.
- July 1930 – July 1932 – Division chief of staff.
- 1932–1934 – Chief of staff of the 80th Rifle Regiment of the 27th Rifle Division.
- 1934–1937 – Attended the M. V. Frunze Military Academy.
- 1937–1938 – Tactics instructor at the Higher Rifle-Tactics Course "Vystrel."
- 1938–1939 – Moved to the reserve (due to a purge).
- 1939–1940 – Adjutant of the chief of staff of the 3rd Rifle Division.
- 1940–1941 – Deputy Chief of Staff of the 18th Rifle Corps in the Far Eastern Military District.
- 1941 – Colonel. Joined the Communist Party of the Soviet Union.
- January–March 1941 – Chief of the operations directorate of the 18th Rifle Corps staff.
- March–September 1941 – Chief of staff of the 31st Rifle Corps.
- Since September 1941 – Commander of the 41st Rifle Division in the Privolzhsky District.
- After January 1942 – Fought on the southwestern front
- May 1942 – Division was encircled. He was captured by German forces.

== Collaboration with Nazi Germany ==
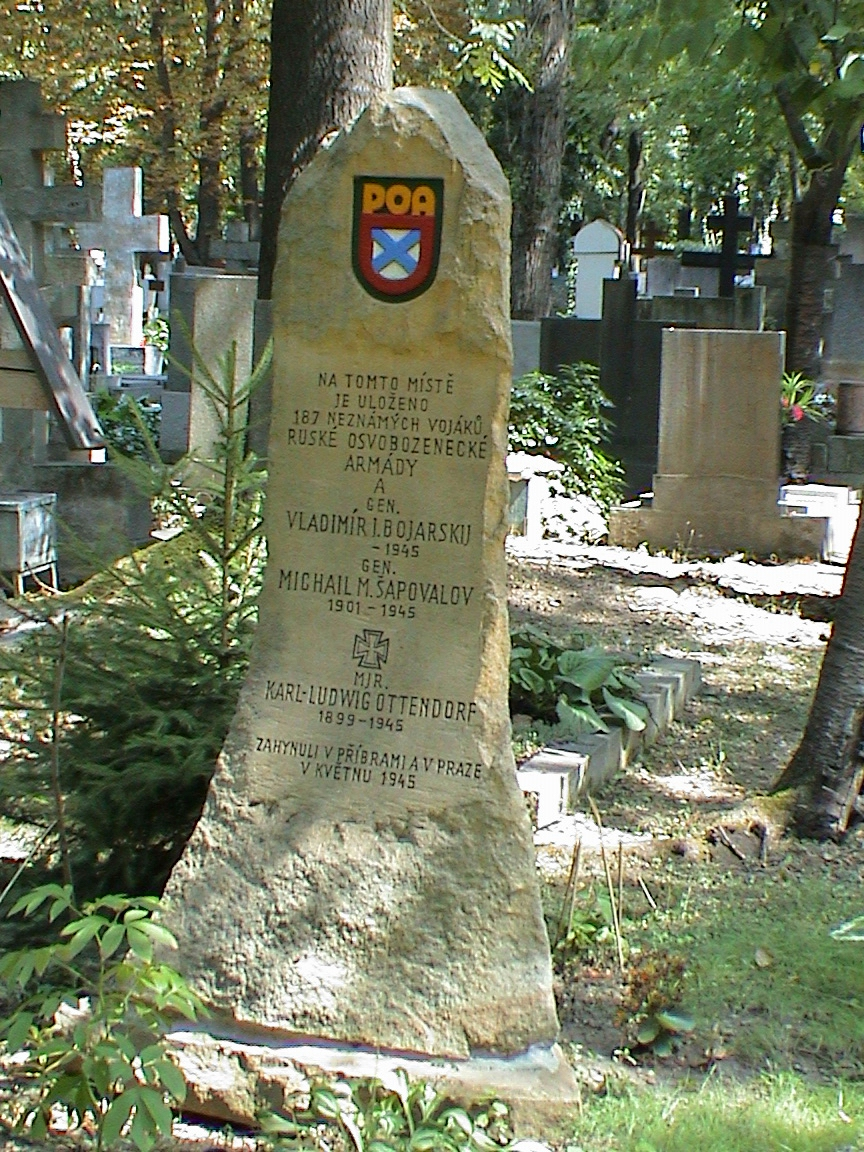
Grave of Boyarsky at Olšany Cemetery

In captivity, he announced his desire to cooperate with the German authorities. He was kept in a special camp near Vinnytsia, on 3 August 1942, together with General Andrey Vlasov, signed an appeal to the German command with an appeal for the formation of the Russian Liberation Army. In the same month he was released from the camp and on 1 September 1942 he was appointed commander of the Russian National People's Army (RNNA), created as an experiment and stationed in the village of Asintorf between Smolensk and Orsha.

The work on the creation of RNNA was supervised by the Abwehr. By October 1942 there were about 4,000 thousand soldiers in this military unit, but then the German command decided to divide it into battalions, which were to be used separately by the Wehrmacht. Boyarsky opposed this decision, was arrested, but was soon released and appointed officer in command and training of the Eastern Volunteer Forces at the headquarters of the 16th Army. In this capacity, he again clashed with the German authorities and was fired.

Since the summer of 1943, he inspected volunteer Russian battalions, under the command of General Vlasov. He took an active part in the creation of the Armed Forces of the Committee for the Liberation of the Peoples of Russia (Russian Liberation Army) and the development of the political program of Armed Forces. From January to May 1945, he was Deputy Chief of Staff of the Russian Liberation Army under command of General Fyodor Truhin.

On 5 May 1945, by order of Truhin, he went to the Prague area to establish contact with the most combat-ready military unit of the KONR – the 1st Infantry Division of General Sergey Bunyachenko. In the town of Příbram, he was captured by Czech partisans commanded by the Soviet captain Smirnov. On 7 May 1945, he got into a skirmish with Smirnov, gave him a slap in the face and was immediately executed by hanging.
