= Afiny =

Afiny Афіни
- Village
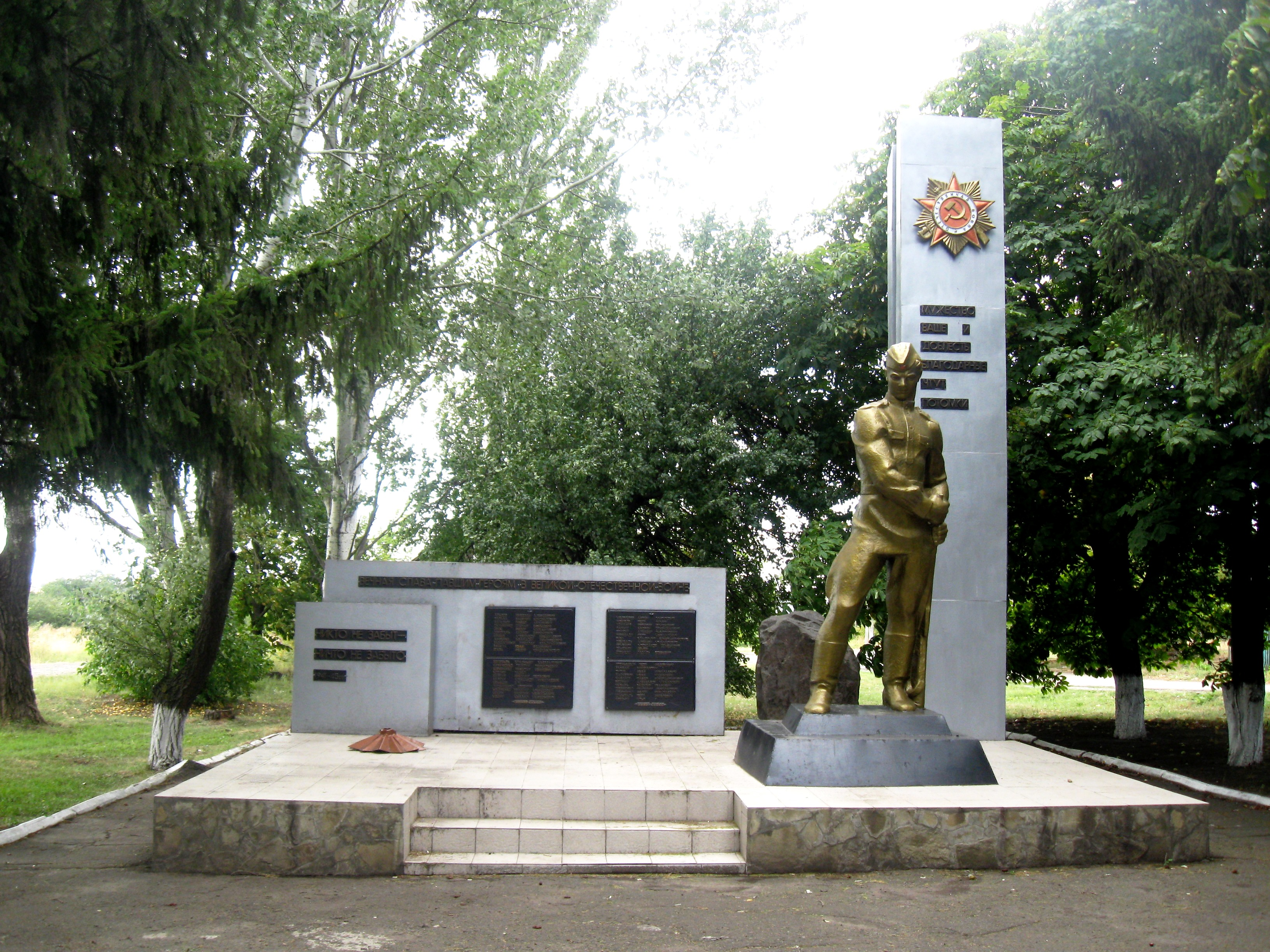

- Location of Afiny within Ukraine Afiny (Ukraine)
- Coordinates: 47.290833°N 37.606111°E
- Country: Ukraine
- Oblast: Donetsk Oblast
- Raion: Mariupol Raion
- Hromada: Kalchyk rural hromada
- Founded: 1927
- Named for: Athens

Area
  - Total: 0.368 km^{2} (0.142 sq mi)

Population (01.01.2017)
  - Total: 34
  - Density: 92/km^{2} (240/sq mi)
- Time zone: UTC+2 (EET)
  - Summer (DST): UTC+3 (EEST)

Afiny (Ukrainian: Афіни), known in 1945–2024 as Zoria (Ukrainian: Зоря), is a village in Donetsk Oblast, Ukraine.

Since the October Revolution, it has been a Soviet kolkhoz with few inhabitants in the area of Mariupol amongst the villages of the native minority of the Greeks of Mariupol, which was very large amongst the Greeks in Russia and the Soviet Union. The leading communists of the Greek minority named the kolkhoz "Afiny" on 15 May 1927 after the name of Athens, Greece (Greek: Αθήνα, romanized: Athína) and twenty buildings were constructed in the center of the tiny village. The inhabitants were almost all from the local Greek minority. They all came from the villages of Kremenivka, Kalchyk and Kasianivka. Their ancestors were coming in Donetsk, in 1780, from Crimea and from the villages Balky (131 men & 113 women), Chardakly (75 men & 79 women), and Bai-su (51 men & 56 women). It was renamed Zoria in 1945, but it still keeps the name Afiny for the local minority of the Greeks.

In 2022, the village was captured by Russia during Russian invasion of Ukraine.

In 2024, the Ukrainian Verkhovna Rada (parliament) returned the original name to the village.
