= Ivan Dzhukha =

Russian Geologist and Writer

Ivan Georgiyevich Dzhukha (Russian: Иван Георгиевич Джуха; born 6 September 1952) is a Russian geologist and writer of Greek descent, specialised in history of persecuted Greeks in the Soviet Union during Stalin's period.

He leads the Greek Martirology project whose aim is to research and commemorate Soviet repressions against Greeks.

== Books ==
- Одиссея мариупольских греков: Очерки истории / Художник Е. В. Харабет. — Вологда: Изд-во ВГПИ, «ЛиС», 1993. — 160 с. — 10 000 экз. — ISBN 5-87822-008-3. (Also published in Greece)
  - 2-е дополненное и исправленное издание. М. Изд-во Международного ун-та. 2013.
- Милар (мельница): Роман-хроника (1914—1930 гг.). Донецк. Регион. 2000.
  - A novel-chronicle of a Greek family which suffered dekulakization
- «Греческая операция. История репрессий против греков в СССР.» — СПб. Издательство «Алетейя», 2006. — 416 с. — (серия: «Новогреческие исследования»). — 2500 экз.. ISBN 5-89329-854-3
  - A book about the Greek Operation of NKVD
- «Спецэшелоны идут на Восток. История репрессий против греков в СССР. Депортации 1940-х гг.» — СПб. : Издательство «Алетейя», 2008. — 560 с., 7 ил.. — (серия: «Новогреческие исследования»). — 5500 экз.. — 24,5 см. ISBN 978-5-91419-078-8
- "Пишу своими словами...". История репрессий против греков в СССР: письма из лагерей, тюрем и мест спецпоселения. СПб. Алетейя. 2009.
- Стоял позади Парфенон, лежал впереди Магадан. История репрессий против греков в СССР: греки на Колыме. СПб. Алетейя. 2010.
- "Так было, я свидетель...". История репрессий против греков в СССР: Воспоминания. СПб. Алетейя. 2011.
- Так было на Кубани. История репрессий против греков в СССР: репрессий против греков на Кубани. СПб. Алетейя. 2013.
- Книга Памяти греков Краснодарского края. Жертвы 1937-1938 гг. СПб. Алетейя. 2013.
