= Kalchyk rural hromada =

Kalchyk rural hromada Кальчицька сільська громада
- Hromada
- Interactive map of Kalchyk rural hromada
- Country: Ukraine
- Oblast: Donetsk Oblast
- Raion: Mariupol Raion

Area
  - Total: 440.1 km^{2} (169.9 sq mi)

Population (2020)
  - Total: 9,894
  - Density: 22.48/km^{2} (58.23/sq mi)
- Settlements: 16
- Rural settlements: 1
- Villages: 15

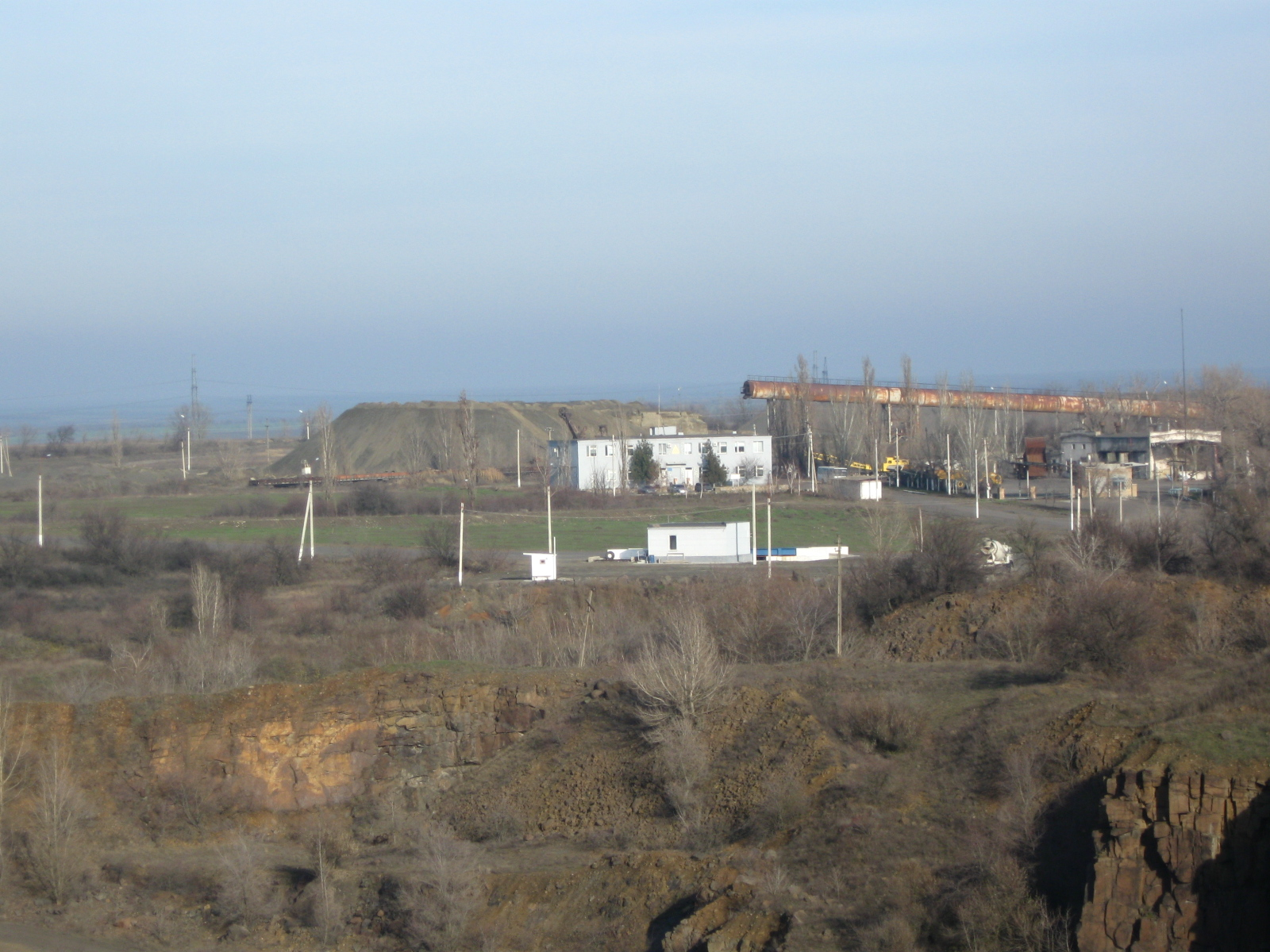
A view of the industrial quarry area in the Kalchyk rural hromada, Donetsk Oblast

Kalchyk rural hromada (Ukrainian: Кальчицька сільська громада) is a hromada of Ukraine, located in Mariupol Raion, Donetsk Oblast. Its administrative center is the village of Kalchyk.

It has an area of 440.1 square kilometres (169.9 mi^{2}) and a population of 9,894, as of 2020.

The hromada contains 16 settlements: 1 rural settlement (Aslanove) and 15 villages:

- Kalchyk
- Afiny
- Hranitne
- Kasianivka
- Katerynivka
- Kelerivka
- Khersones
- Kliuchove
- Kremenivka
- Kyrylivka
- Makedonivka
- Maloianysol
- Pryovrazhne
- Truzhenka
- Vodiane

== See also ==
- List of hromadas of Ukraine
