= Georgis Kostoprav =

Ukrainian Greek poet (1903–1938)

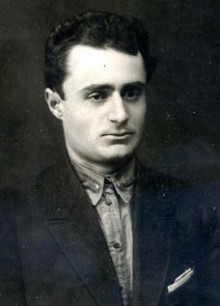
- Georgis Kostoprav
- Born: 27 October 1903 O.S. (9 November 1903 N.S.); Maloyanisol, Mariupolsky Uyezd, Yekaterinoslav Governorate of the Russian Empire (now Donetsk Oblast of Ukraine)
- Died: 14 February 1938 (aged 34); Zhdanov (now Mariupol), UkSSR, USSR
- Citizenship: Russian Empire (1903–1917); Soviet Union (1922–1938)
- Occupations: Poet, journalist, translator

Georgis Kostoprav (Greek: Γεωργής Κωστοπράβ; Ukrainian: Георгій Антонович Костоправ, 9 November 1903 – 14 February 1938) was a Rumeika poet, playwright and journalist, who wrote in Mariupol Greek.

== Life ==
Georgis Kostoprav was born in the village Maloyanisol (then Maly Yanisol') into a family of a scrivener. After two years elementary school in his village he went to Mariupol Realschule.

From 1926 to 1927 Kostoprav served in the Red Army. In 1927 he worked in Illich Steel and Iron Works as a secretary in the personnel department. In 1932 Kostoprav started to work in Mariupol Greek (Rumeika) newspaper Kolechtivistis as an executive editor and journalist. In 1933 he published his first book of poems and in 1934 became a member of the Union of Soviet writers. Actively participating in editing, publishing, conferences, Kostoprav was regarded as a leader of the Greek writers' group. The review of 1937 claims him "the biggest Soviet Greek writer".

In 1936 he married Olga Maslakova.

In the night 23/24 December 1937 Kostoprav was arrested in course of so-called Greek operation. 14 February he was sentenced to death and shot the same day. His widow was informed that he died of sarcoma on 23 July 1944 (this date was later repeated in his biographies, until the documents on his sentence and execution were published). He was officially rehabilitated in 1957.

== Writing ==
Kostoprav published in 1920s his first poems written in Russian in Mariupol newspapers Il'ichovets, Golos truda, Priazovskii proletarii. In 1930s he published his poems and short stories in Rumeika Greek in local almanacs and magazines Flogomitres Spithes, Neotita, Neos Machitis, Pioneros and in the newspaper Kolechtivistis.

In 1933 was published Kostoprav's debut book of poems The first steps, including his poetry and translations from Russian and Ukrainian poets. In 1934 he published a poem Leontis Chonagbeis about a Rumeika folk poet of 19 century Leontis Chonagbeis.

Kostoprav's short stories were included into the reading book for Mariupol Greek schools, edited by Amphiktyon Dimitriu.

Kostoprav's play Autumn leaves was staged in the Mariupol Greek theatre, which switched in 1935 from Russian into Mariupol Greek. He also translated for this theatre multiple plays from Russian.

During his short career Kostoprav also contributed to translations from Russian, including two books of Chekhov's stories, poems of Alexander Pushkin and Agniya Barto's poetry for kids. No less essential are his translations into Mariupol Greek from Ukrainian poets, Maksym Rylsky, Volodymyr Sosiura and Taras Shevchenko, in particular he translated Shevchenko's Testament.

He also translated into Russian, among others, a poem of Rumeika poet Vasily Gala Pirnos and some samples of Rumeika folklore.

== Publications ==
- Ta prota vimata (Τα πρώτα βήματα, "The first steps"). Preface by F. Yali in Greek and in Russian. Mariupol, 1933.
- Leontis Chonagbeis (Λεοντής Χονάγμπεης, "Leontis Chonagbeis"). Mariupol, 1934.
- Kalimera, zisimo (Καλημέρα, ζήσιμο! "Hello, life!"). Stalino, 1937. – 96 p.
- G. A. Kostoprav: sochineniia (Г. А. Костоправ: сочинения, "G. A. Kostoprav: works"). Eds. G. A. Animitsa and M. P. Galikbarova. Mariupol, 2012. The book includes Russian, Ukrainian and Rumeika writings of Kostoprav.

=== Translations ===
In 1930s Russian translations of Kostoprav's poems regularly emerged in literary magazines.

- G. Kostoprav. Dva mitinga (Два митинга, "Two meetings"), an authorised translation by A. Faber. Literaturnyi Donbass, 1934, no. 4–5, p. 116–118.
- G. Kostoprav. Groza (Гроза, "Thunder"), an authorised translation by P. Shadura. Literaturnyi Donbass, 1936, no. 3, p. 73.

Posthumously under the same title Hello, life were published two books of translations into Russian and Ukrainian:

- Kalimera, zisimo! (Калимера, зисимо!). Poems in Russian translations /Ed. B. Ya. Shadur, preface by E. Voloshko. Donetsk: "Knizhnoe izdatelstvo", 1963. – 194 p. (2nd ed. 1989., 126 p.)
- Kalimera, zisimo! (Калімера, зісімо!). Poems in Ukrainian translations. /Ed. Olga Kostoprav. Dnipropetrovs'k: "Dnipro", 1969. – 143 p.

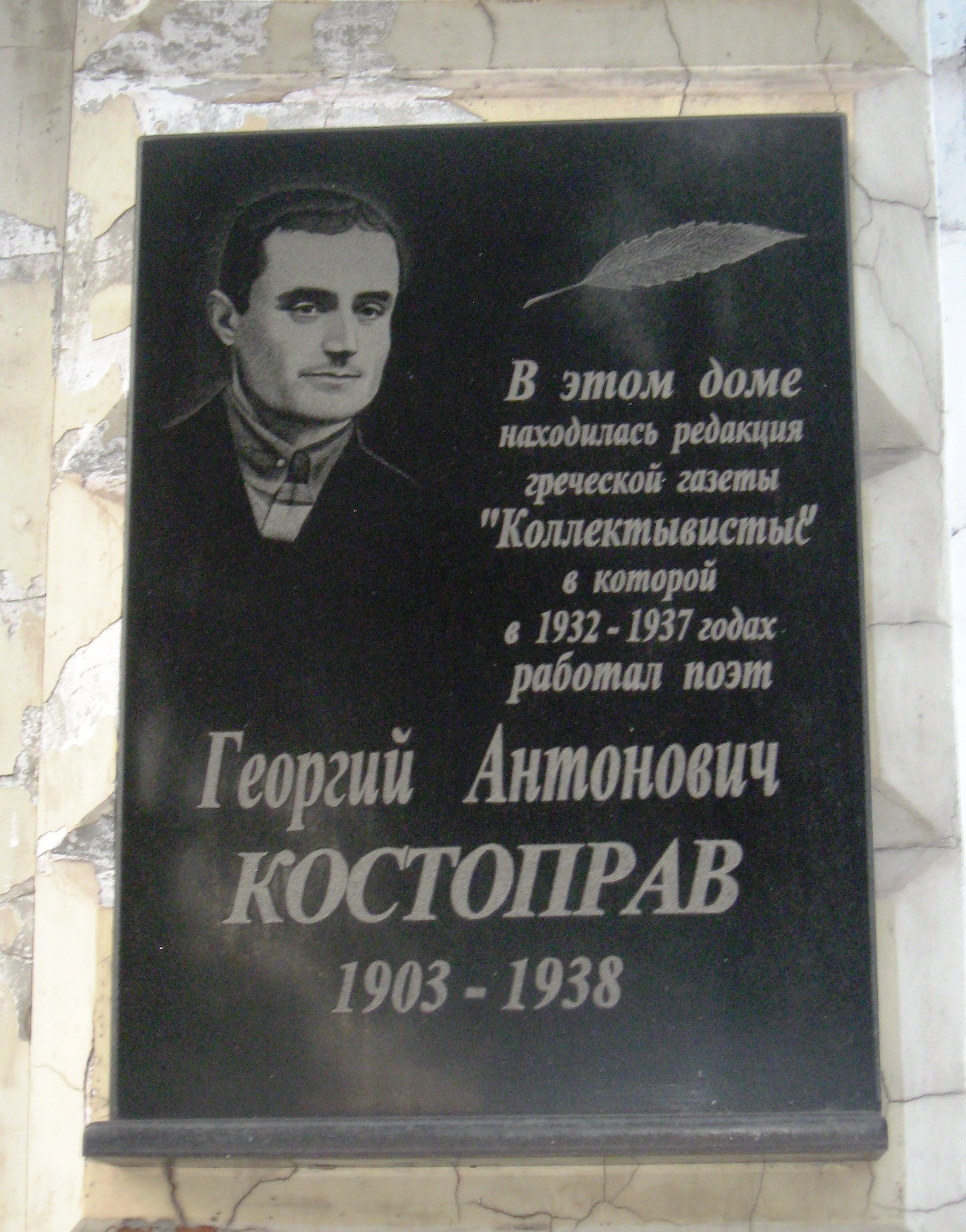
Commemorative plaque of Kostoprav in Mariupol, Ukraine.

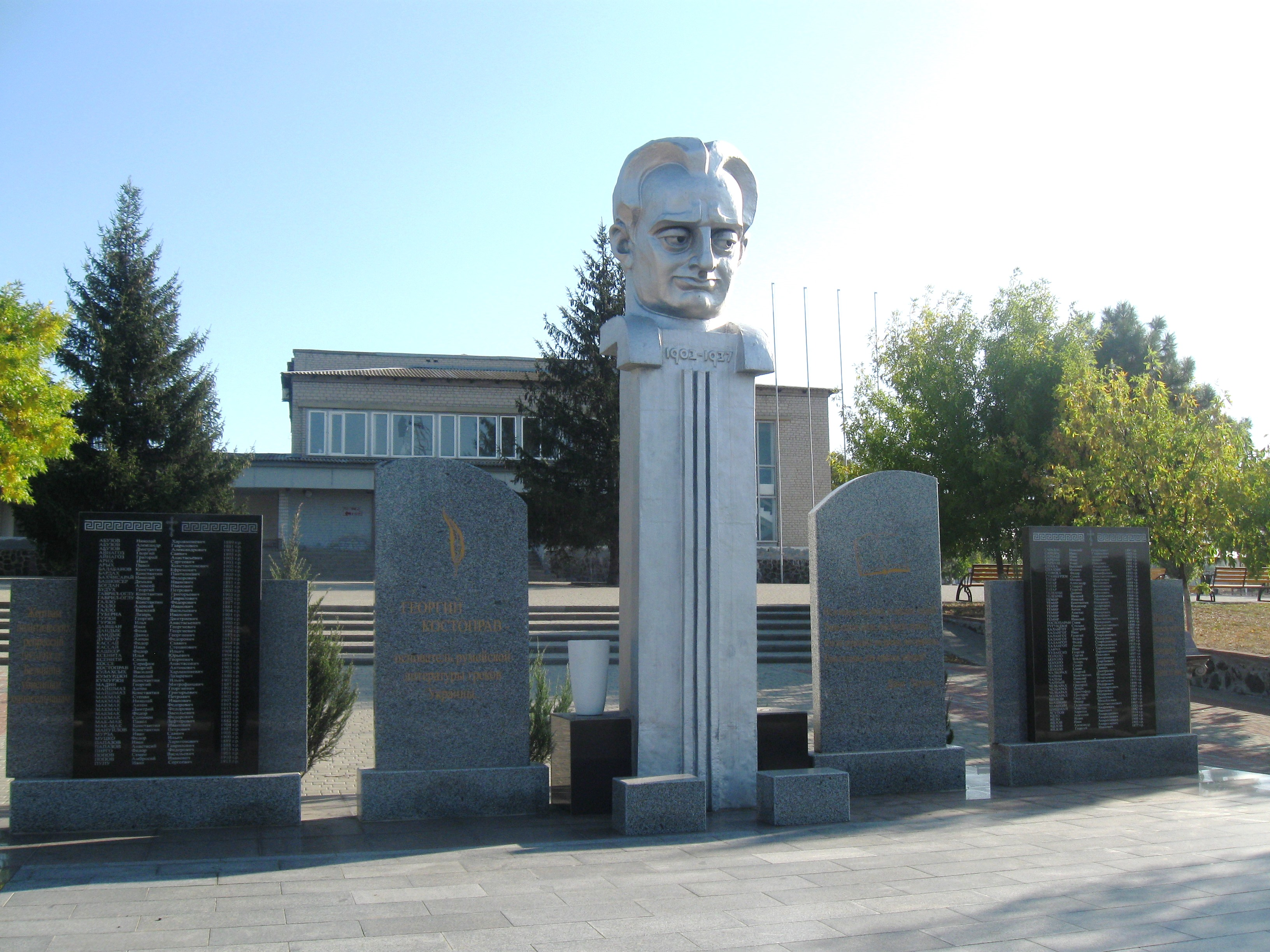
The Kostoprav monument in his home village Maloyanisol', Ukraine by sculptor L. Kuz'minkov and V. Konstantinov.

== Commemoration ==
- In 1994 in the village Maloyanisol, where Kostoprav was born, was erected his monument and opened a museum. Also in poet's name is named one of the streets in the village.
- In November 2003, on anniversary of Kostoprav's birth, a commemorative plaque was placed in Mariupol on the building, where once has been located the editorial of the Rumeika Greek newspaper Kolechtivistis (Miru avenue, 35). Judging by recent footage from the place, the plaque did not survive the Russian siege of Mariupol in 2022.
- In 2026, MC бастард Сєргєй used an excerpt from the poem "Unconquered" by Georgis Kostoprav, translated by Volodymyr Sosiura, in his song "Маєш право мати всі права" (in English: "You Have the Right to Have All Rights")
