= Annunciation Greek Orthodox Church, Rostov-on-Don =

Greek Orthodox church in Rostov-on-Don, Russia

Annunciation Greek Orthodox Church
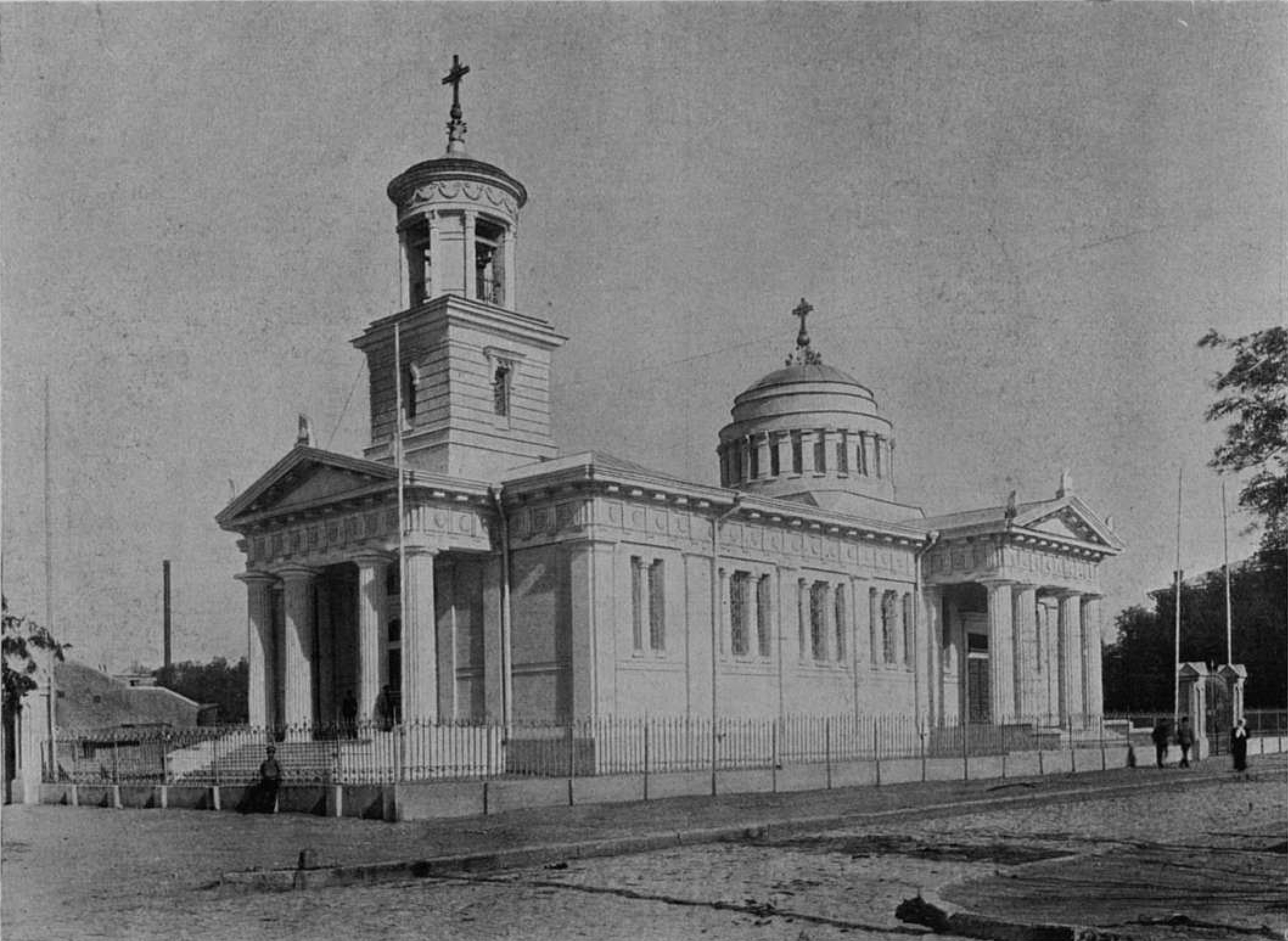

- Location within Russia

Religion
- Affiliation: Russian Orthodox

Location
- Location: Rostov-on-Don, Rostov Oblast, Russia
- Interactive map of Annunciation Greek Orthodox Church
- Coordinates: 47.2258°N 39.7282°E

Architecture
- Architect: I.P Zlobin
- Style: Byzantine Revival
- Completed: 1909

The Annunciation Greek Orthodox Church Russian: (Греческая церковь в честь Благовещения Пресвятой Девы Марии) was a Greek Orthodox church constructed in 1909 in Rostov-on-Don. In Soviet times, the church was demolished, and the Puppet Theatre was built on its foundations. A new Greek church of the Annunciation was built close to the site of the demolished one in 2014.

== History ==
The Greek Church of the Annunciation was built in Rostov-on-Don at the beginning of the 20th century. The temple was situated in Tkachevsky Lane (present-day Universitetsky) at its intersection with Malo-Sadovaya Street (now Suvorov Street) at the territory, which belonged to the Hellenic Charitable Society. Funds for the construction of a temple were donated by Greeks who lived in the city. The most significant contribution was made by the owner of the tobacco factory Achilles Aslanidi. The church was founded in 1907, and in 1909 the building was completed.

Author of the project was the architect I.P. Zlobin. Construction was carried out under the direction of the city architect G.N. Vasilyev. The murals inside were drawn by the artist E.G. Cherepakhin. The temple was built in the Neoclassicist style. Above the main entrance with the portico towered a twenty-meter high bunk belfry. In the church operated a library with books in the Greek language. In 1913-1914, the rector of the church was priest Parisis Sava.

In the 1930s the church was closed. During the German occupation of Rostov it was reopened. On November 6, 1942 near the Church of the Annunciation there was held a parade of Romanian troops dedicated to the birthday of the Romanian King Michael I. The event was attended by German officers. The parade ended with a solemn liturgy in the Church of the Annunciation.

In 1959 the church was closed again. The building was handed over to School No. 7. The building housed gym and production workshops. In 1964 the church was demolished, and the Puppet Theatre was built on its foundations. Yet the old church walls were partially preserved.

== The new church ==
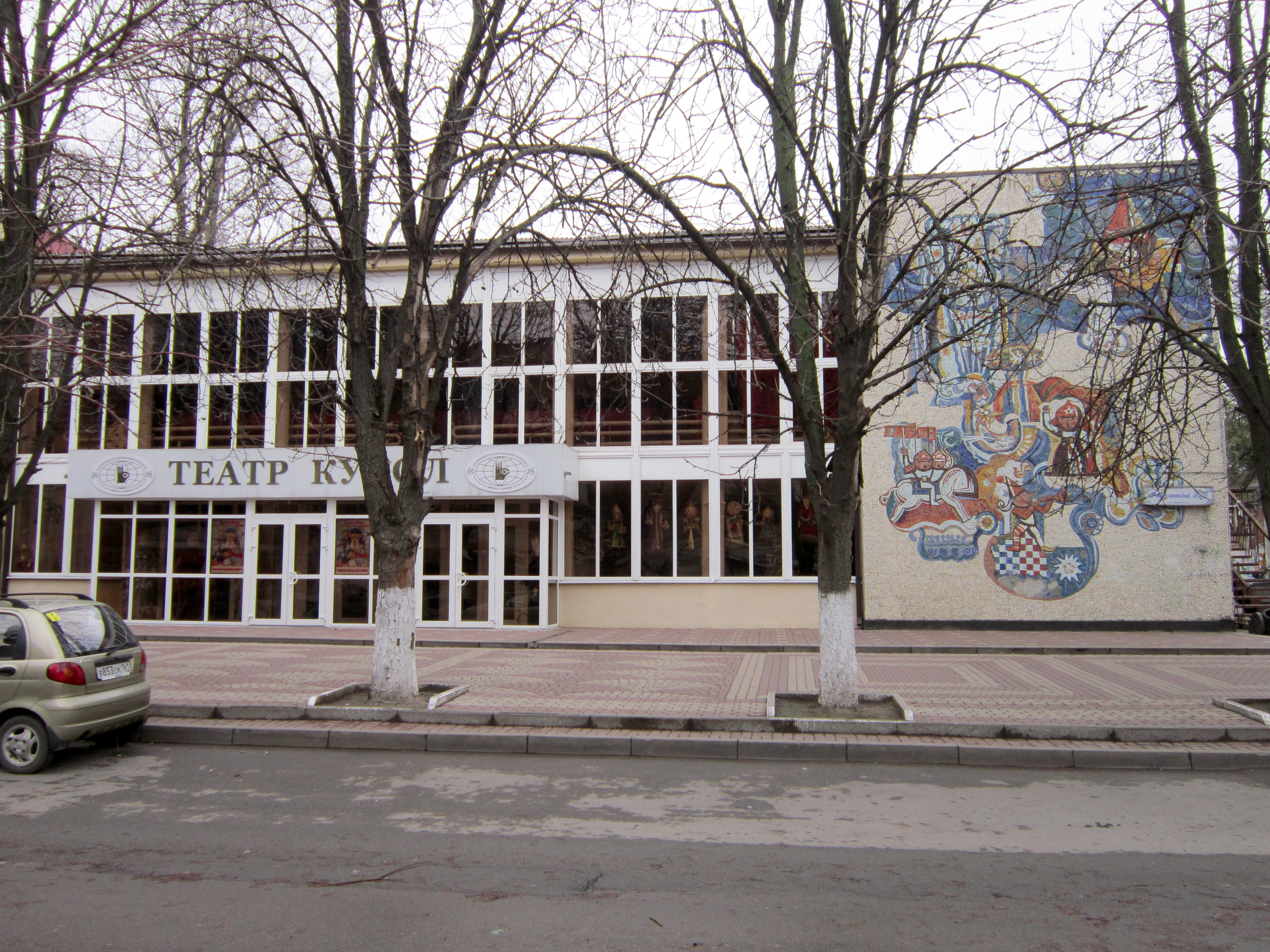
The Puppet Theatre

After the fall of the Soviet Union there was a discussion in Rostov about the possibility of restoration of the Church of Annunciation and transfer of the Puppet Theatre to another place. However, this idea did not find much support, and then it was decided to construct a new church nearby. In 2003, the land area of 0.2099 hectares at Kirov Avenue has been allocated for the construction of the church. Originally it was planned to recreate the initial project, but later it was decided to build a completely new church in neo-Byzantine style. The author of the project was architect G. Shevchenko.

The solemn ceremony of foundation of the church took place on 22 September 2007. In 2012, next to the constructing temple there was built a small temporary church where services would be held before the end of construction works.

The Rostov museum of local history still possesses a memorial board of the first church that says "there was laid a stone in the name of the Annunciation Church" in August 1907. This board was planned to be given to the new church after its opening.

The main construction works were finished in October 2014. Since January 2015 the church has been active.

There also was a scandal about handing the building of the former church, which is now occupied by the puppet theatre, to the Russian Orthodox Church. The Church representatives stated that the theatre would stay in the building until another appropriate place for it was found.
