= Constantine Kromiadi =

Greek-Russian military officer

- Константин Григориевич Кромиади (Russian); Κωνσταντίνος Γκριγκόριεβιτς Κρομιάδης (Greek)
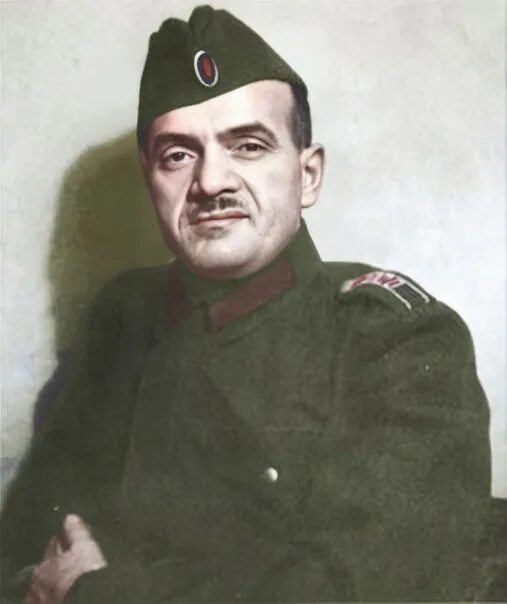
- Kromiadi in Russian National People's Army uniform

Personal details
- Born: 21 January 1893 Kars, Kars Oblast, Russian Empire
- Died: 25 April 1990 (aged 97) Munich, Bavaria, West Germany
- Awards: Cross of St. George
- Nickname: Sanin

Military service
- Allegiance: Russian Empire (1914-1917); Russian State (1918-1920); Nazi Germany (1941–1945); Committee for the Liberation of the Peoples of Russia (1944–1945)
- Years of service: 1914–1920; 1941–1945
- Rank: General (Russian Liberation Army)
- Commands: White Army; Caucasus Front; Russian National People's Army; Russian Liberation Army HQ
- Battles/wars: World War I Russian Civil War; World War II

Constantine Gregorievich Kromiadi (Russian: Константин Григориевич Кромиади, Greek: Κωνσταντίνος Γκριγκόριεβιτς Κρομιάδης; 21 January 1893 – 25 April 1990) was a Russian military officer of Greek origin. A staunch anti-communist, he served in the Imperial Russian Army and the White Army, later heading the collaborationist Russian National People's Army and commanding the headquarters of the Russian Liberation Army.

== First years ==
Kromiadi was born in Kars (then part of the Russian Empire), into a Greek family, in 1893. He entered service in the Imperial Russian Army as a volunteer and fought during World War I in Persia and also on the Caucasus Front, where many Armenians, Caucasus Greeks, Georgians, and Russians fought against the forces of the Ottoman Empire. During the Russian Civil War Kromiadi joined the White movement, achieving the rank of colonel. After the war he emigrated to Munich where he worked as automobilist.

== In Axis army ==
During World War II, Kromiadi became a Nazi official and a pioneer of the Russian Liberation Movement. In 1942, he headed the Russian National People's Army, an armed unit of Russians, under the pseudonym of Sanin. He was also a general in the Russian Liberation Army. Kromiadi became close with fellow collaborator Andrey Vlasov, thus becoming Vlasov's first white émigré ally. In late 1942, Vlasov gave Kromiadi command of his headquarters. Kromiadi made several attempts to attract white émigrés to Vlasov, and was finally successful by the time of the Prague Manifesto, having secured the support of two branches of the Russian Orthodox Church.

Kromiadi believed that the Russian Liberation Army was a 30-year Christian liberation war against Communism.

== Later life ==
In the final days of World War II, Kromiadi was wounded in the leg and, when Vlasov and his staff relocated to Füssen, he was placed in a private residence in order to recover. A few days later they headed towards southern Bohemia, leaving Kromiadi behind in Füssen since he was still recuperating. Vlasov and his staff surrendered to the American forces and were later handed over to the Red Army. Vlasov and his senior men were tried and executed in the Soviet Union. Kromiadi was living amongst the civilians in Füssen at the time and escaped this fate. After the war, he took an active part in helping Russian collaborators avoid the repatriation to the Soviet Union.

In 1980, he wrote a book on his experience in the Russian Liberation Movement called For Land, for Freedom..., which was published in San Francisco. He died in 1990 in Munich.
