= Mariupol Greek =

Language of the Greeks from the Ukrainian Azov shore

- румеку глоса
- Native to: Ukraine
- Region: Northern coast of the Sea of Azov
- Native speakers: (20,000 cited 1989 census); 17 villages (2017 estimate)
- Language family: Indo-European: Hellenic; Greek; (disputed); Attic–Ionic; Attic; Koine; (disputed); Mariupol Greek
- Writing system: Cyrillic, Greek

Official status
- Recognised minority language in: Ukraine

Language codes
- ISO 639-3: –
- Glottolog: mari1411
- Linguasphere: 56-AAA-ak
- IETF: pnt-UA

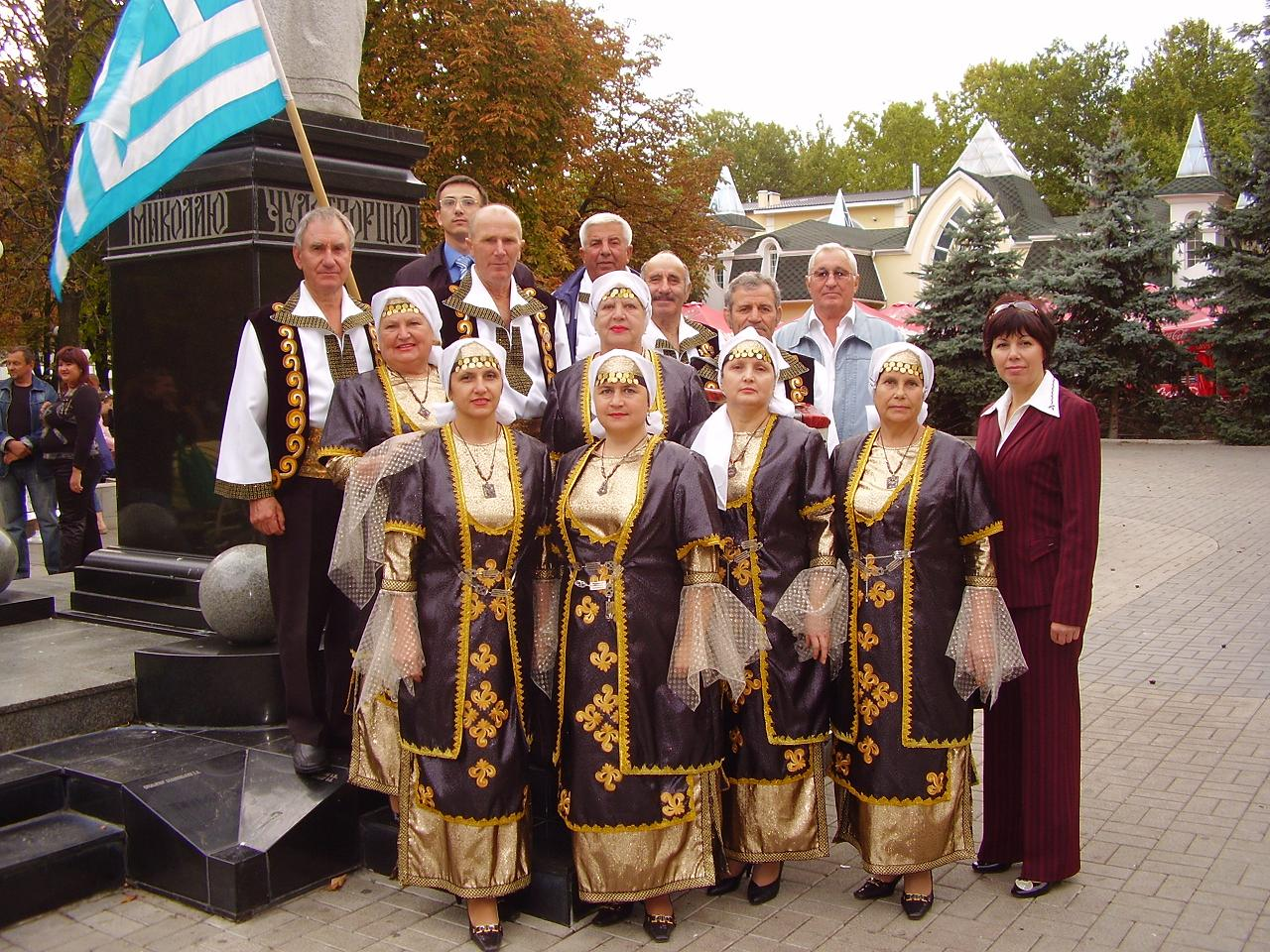
Azov Greeks near the monument to Mykola Chudotvorets (Nicholas the Miraclemaker) in Ukraine

Mariupol Greek (руме́ку гло́са, IPA: [rʊˈmʲɛkʊ ˈɣɫosɐ]), also known as Crimean Greek, Rumeika and Tauro-Romaic (from Greek: Ρωμαίικα, "Romaic"; Ukrainian: Румейська мова, romanized: Rumejska mova), is a Greek variety spoken by the ethnic Greeks living along the northern coast of the Sea of Azov, in southeastern Ukraine; the community itself is referred to as Azov Greeks.

Although Mariupol Greek, along with the Urum language, remained the main language spoken by the Azov Greeks well into the 20th century, currently it is used by only a small part of Ukraine's ethnic Greeks.

== History ==
Ancient Greek colonies of the Northern Black Sea

The Crimean peninsula was Greek-speaking for more than two and a half thousand years as a part of the ancient Greek colonies and of the Byzantine Empire. Greek city-states began establishing colonies along the Black Sea coast of Crimea in the 7th or 6th century BC. The majority of these colonies were established by Ionians from the city of Miletus in Asia Minor. After the Fourth Crusade's sacking of Constantinople fragmented the Byzantine Empire, Crimea became a principality within the Greek Empire of Trebizond. When that state, which was centered on the eastern Black Sea coast and Pontic Alps of northeastern Anatolia, fell to the Ottomans in 1461, the Crimean Greek principality (Principality of Theodoro) remained independent, becoming subject to the Ottomans in 1475. The beginning of large-scale settlement of Greeks in the steppe region north of the Sea of Azov dates to the Russo-Turkish War (1768–74), when Catherine the Great of Russia invited Greeks of Crimea to resettle to recently conquered lands (including founding Mariupol) to escape persecution in the then Muslim-dominated Crimea.

Due to the centuries living under Tatar and Turkish rule, many of the Greeks no longer spoke the Greek language; thus the community was divided into the Greek-speaking Rumeis and the Turkic-speaking Urums (see Urum language).

In the 20th century, Mariupol Greek was the Greek dialect used by most Greek-speaking villages in the North Azov Sea Coast region. There are about 17 villages that speak this language today. Modern scholars distinguish five subdialects of the variety according to their similarity to standard Modern Greek.

Mariupol Greek is not the only Greek variety spoken in the northern Azov regions: the village of Anadol speaks Pontic proper, being settled from the Pontos in 1826.

== Classification ==
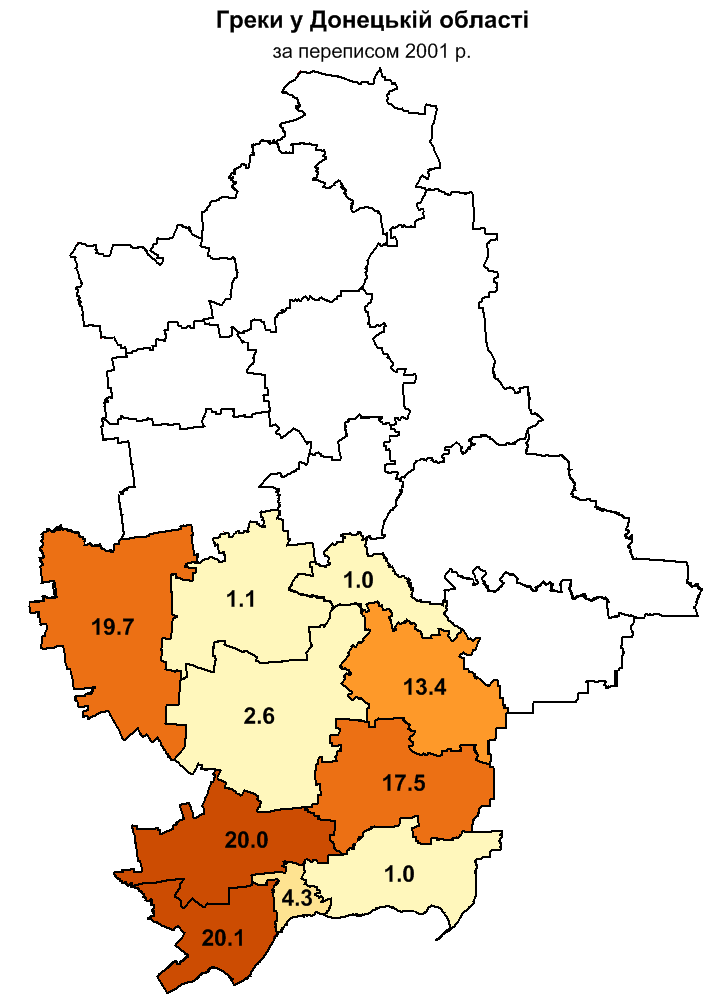
Ethnic Greeks (including Urums) in Donetsk Oblast

Mariupol Greek is often described as a Pontic dialect. According to modern researchers, the situation is not so simple: arguments can be made for the language's similarity both to Pontic Greek and to Northern Greek dialects. In the view of Maxim Kisilier, while Mariupol Greek shares some features with both Pontic Greek and Northern Greek dialects, it is better considered on its own terms, as a separate Greek dialect, or even a group of dialects.

== Orthography ==
In the 1920s, an alphabet based on Greek Alphabet was developed for Mariupol Greek. In many ways, it was similar to the Pontic Greek alphabet and had the following form:

Α α	Β β	Γ γ	Δ δ	Ε ε	Ζ ζ	Θ θ	Ι ι	Κ κ	Λ λ	Μ μ
Ν ν	Ο ο	Π π	Ρ ρ	Σ σ,ς	Τ τ	Υ υ	Φ φ	Χ χ

In 1969, A. A. Beletsky developed a new version of the Mariupol Greek alphabet, this time based on the Cyrillic alphabet. In 1973, this alphabet was first used in print and has been regularly used ever since. This alphabet looks as follows:

А а	Б б	В в	Г г	Гк гк	Д д	Дъ дъ	Е е	Ж ж	Дж дж
З з	Дз дз	И и	Й й	К к	Л л	М м	Н н	О о	П п
Р р	С с	Т т	Тъ тъ	У у	Ф ф	Х х	Ц ц	Ч ч	Ш ш
Ы ы	Э э	Ю ю	Я я

== Research and literature ==
After the October Revolution of 1917, a Rumaiic revival occurred in the region. As part of the general policy of korenizatsiya, the Soviet administration established a Rumaiic Mariupol Greek theatre, several magazines and newspaper and a number of Rumaiic language schools. The best Rumaiic poet Georgis Kostoprav created a Rumaiic poetic language for his work. However, starting in 1926, the Soviet authorities opted to conduct the korenizatsiya more specifically as a policy of Hellenisation, which aimed to transfer the education and cultural life of local Greeks to Dimotiki (as used in Greece proper), as opposed to the non-standardised Ukrainian Greek dialects. This approach was controversial and met with difficulties and some resistance. Both of these processes were reversed in 1937 as Kostoprav and many other Rumaiics and Urums were killed as part of Joseph Stalin's national policies. A large percentage of the population was transported to Gulags.

Mariupol Greek became subject of linguistic study in the late 1920s and 1930s, as part of the general program of identifying and describing languages of the USSR. However, linguists studying the language became victims of Stalin's repressions by 1937, and the research on the variety did not resume until the 1950s and 1960s.

Scholars of Greek from Kyiv, led by Andriy Biletsky compiled a detailed description of the language and recorded the folklore. As the Azov Greeks had apparently lost literacy in Greek already during the Crimean period of their history, Biletsky developed a Cyrillic writing system, based on the Russian and Ukrainian Cyrillic for them in 1969.

A number of books have been published in the Rumeíka Greek using this Cyrillic orthography. Besides native works, they included translations of the Lay of Igor's Campaign and of Taras Shevchenko's Kobzar.

A new attempt to preserve a sense of ethnic Rumaiic identity started in the mid-1980s. Though a number of writers and poets make use of the Cyrillic alphabet, the population of the region rarely uses it; the majority of self-identified ethnic Greeks of Ukraine now consider Russian their mother language. In early 2000s Mariupol Greek was declining rapidly, most endangered by standard Modern Greek, which is taught in schools and at the local university. Nonetheless, the investigations by Alexandra Gromova demonstrated that there is still hope that elements of the Rumaiic population will continue to use the dialect.

== See also ==
- Mariupol#Language structure, for the overall linguistic situation in the region
- Varieties of Modern Greek
- Poetry of Leontij Kyrjakov in Rumaiic language
