= Asintorf =

Asintorf Асінторф (Belarusian) Осинторф
- Agrotown
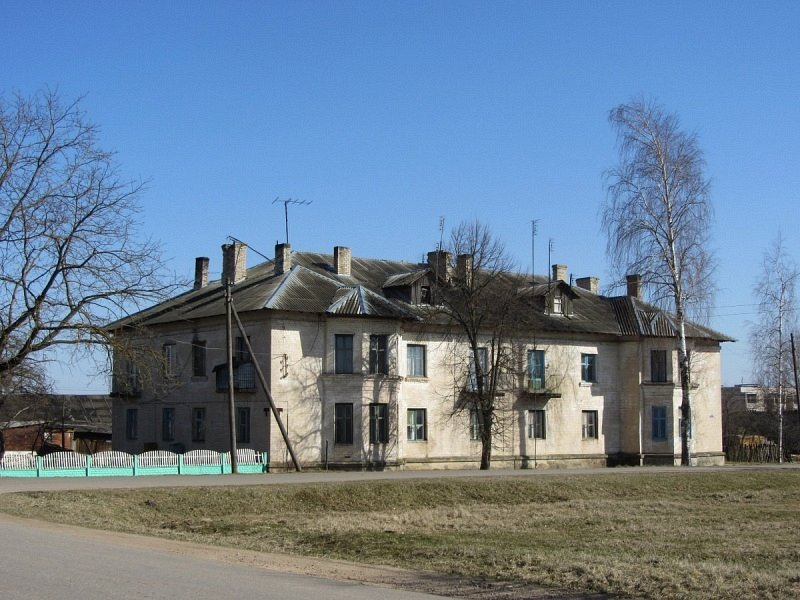
- Interactive map of Asintorf
- Location within Belarus
- Coordinates: 53°43′00″N 30°39′00″E
- Country: Belarus
- Region: Vitebsk
- District: Dubrowna
- Founded: 1934
- Current status: 2004
- Elevation: 165 m (541 ft)

Population (2001)
  - Total: 950
- Time zone: UTC+3 (MSK)
- Postal code: 211046
- Area code: +375 2137

Asintorf (Belarusian: Асінторф) is agro-town in the Dubrowna district of the Vitebsk region of Belarus. The administrative center of the Osintorfsky village council.

== History ==
On November 15, 1934, the workers' settlement of Osintorf was formed in the Orsha District. From September 9, 1946 - part of the Orekhovsky District, from July 16, 1954 - part of the Orsha District, from January 6, 1965 - part of the Dubrovensky District.

On April 8, 2004, the workers' settlement of Osintorf was classified as a rural settlement, in connection with which the Osintorfsky Village Council was abolished and the Osintorfsky Village Council was formed.

In 2011, the settlement of Osintorf was transformed into an agro-town. The ophthalmologist Daniil Pavlov was born in the town.
