= Kazakhstan–European Union relations =

- European Union: Kazakhstan

Envoy
- Ambassador Sven-Olov Carlsson: Ambassador Margulan B. Baimukhan

Kazakhstan–European Union relations are the international relations between the Republic of Kazakhstan and the common foreign policy and trade relations of the European Union.

The bilateral relationship began in 1992 with the signing of the Protocol on establishing diplomatic relations between Kazakhstan and the EU. It has evolved considerably since then to include several formats of cooperation, including the Enhanced Partnership and Cooperation Agreement (EPCA), as well as the establishment of several dialogues designed to help implement social, political and economic reforms.

The EU is Kazakhstan’s largest economic partner, representing roughly 30% of its total trade in goods, and receives 41% of Kazakhstan’s exports. Kazakhstan is also a major receiver of FDI coming from the EU.

Since the Russian invasion of Ukraine, the EU and Kazakhstan have deepened their trade relations through mutual trade deals that seek to reduce reliance on Russia, including an agreement from November 2022 that seeks to "develop supplies of green hydrogen and raw materials to manufacture equipment such as wind turbines and batteries for electric cars."

== Comparison ==
Comparison of the European Union and Kazakhstan
Metric	European Union	Kazakhstan
Population	447,206,135	20,698,000+
Area	4,324,782 km^{2} (1,669,808 sq mi)	2,724,900 km^{2} (1,052,100 sq mi)
Population Density	115/km^{2} (300/sq mi)	7/km^{2} (18.1/sq mi)
Capital	Brussels (de facto)	Astana
Global Cities	Paris, Rome, Berlin, Vienna, Madrid, Amsterdam, Athens, Dublin, Helsinki, Warsaw, Lisbon, Stockholm, Copenhagen, Prague, Bucharest, Nicosia, Budapest, Tallinn, Sofia, Riga, Ljubljana, Bratislava, Vilnius, Zagreb	Astana, Almaty, Aktobe, Karaganda, Kokshetau, Kostanay, Atyrau, Pavlodar, Taraz, Jezkazgan, Kyzylorda, Semey, Ekibastuz, Shymkent, Arkalyk, Zhanaozen, Ridder, Temirtau, Stepnogorsk
Government	Supranational parliamentary democracy based on the European treaties	Unitary dominant-party Semi-presidential constitutional republic
First Leader	High Authority President Jean Monnet	President Nursultan Nazarbayev
Current Leader	Council President António Costa; Commission President Ursula von der Leyen	President Kassym-Jomart Tokayev; Prime Minister Oljas Bektenov
Official languages	24 official languages	Kazakh, Russian
Main Religions	72% Christianity (48% Roman Catholicism, 12% Protestantism, 8% Eastern Orthodoxy, 4% Other Christianity), 23% non-Religious, 3% Other, 2% Islam	70.2% Muslims; 26.3% Christians; 3.5% others
Ethnic groups	Germans (ca. 80 million), French (ca. 67 million), Italians (ca. 60 million), Spanish (ca. 47 million), Poles (ca. 46 million), Romanians (ca. 16 million), Dutch (ca. 13 million), Greeks (ca. 11 million), Portuguese (ca. 11 million), and others	65.5% Kazakh, 21.5% Russian, 3.0% Uzbek, 1.8% Ukrainian, 1.4% Uyghur, 1.2% Tatar, 1.1% German, 4.5% others
GDP (nominal)	$16.477 trillion, $31,801 per capita	$179.332 billion, $9,686 per capita

== Partnership and Cooperation Agreement ==
EU-Kazakhstan bilateral relations are guided by the 2015 Enhanced Partnership and Cooperation Agreement (EPCA). The agreement was ratified by the Kazakh Parliament in March 2016. The European Parliament ratified the agreement on December 12, 2017. 511 of 654 European parliament members voted in favor of ratification. Kazakhstan is the first Central Asian country to conclude the EPCA with the EU.

The EPCA entered into force on March 1, 2020. The agreement governs 29 areas of cooperation, including the trade and economic relations, interaction in the field of transport, energy, climate change, space etc. between the EU and Kazakhstan.

Kazakhstan is also part of New EU Strategy on Central Asia which was adopted in 2019.

== Cooperation Council ==
The Cooperation Council between Kazakhstan and the European Union meets annually and is the body to carry out the bilateral Partnership and Cooperation Agreement. The Cooperation Council and Kazakhstan discuss many issues of mutual importance such as political, judiciary and economic reforms, the rule of law, trade and economic relations, and regional stability.

During the 15th session held on October 4, 2016, the Council welcomed the Enhanced Partnership and Cooperation Agreement. During the Council’s 18th session held in May 2021, the EU welcomed progress made in the implementation of the EU-Kazakhstan Enhanced Partnership and Cooperation Agreement (EPCA) as well as Kazakhstan’s ratification of the Second Optional Protocol to the International Covenant on Civil and Political Rights, and stressed the need for rapid implementation of Kazakhastan’s announced “third stage of political reform” for the democratization of society.

== Trade and Foreign Direct Investment ==
Since 2002, the EU has grown to become Kazakhstan's largest trading partner, being the destination of more than 41% of its exports. Those exports were primarily oil and gas in 2007 80%. That year, EU imports of goods from Kazakhstan amounted to €13.35 billion and services amounted to €1.52 billion. EU exports to Kazakhstan were €6.04 billion in goods and €1.92 billion in services.

In 2014, more than half of Kazakhstan's total trade was with the EU—some $53.4 billion in 2013 and $28.4 billion in the first half of 2014. More than half of Kazakhstan's gross foreign direct investment, or nearly $100 billion, has come from EU countries. Trade to the EU was worth €31 billion (36%). According to Former European Commission Vice President Günther Oettinger, the EU27 have accounted for 44% of the total FDI invested into Kazakhstan over the last 15 years, amounting to $157 billion.

In bilateral meetings with British Prime Minister David Cameron in London, Kazakhstan's President Nazarbayev signed 46 treaties worth over $13 billion in trade value.

Following the EU’s support for its accession, Kazakhstan joined the World Trade Organization (WTO) as its 162nd member state in November 2015.

Kazakhstan, the EU and the International Trade Centre launched in December 2020 the regional project Ready4Trade Central Asia. One of the key areas of the 'Ready4Trade Central Asia project is the development of comprehensive legislation in E-commerce, which is planned to be implemented in Kazakhstan with the assistance of the ITC and the UN Conference on Trade and Development (UNCTAD).

As of 2020, Kazakhstan is the EU’s 33rd biggest trading partner, while the EU is by far Kazakhstan’s biggest, representing roughly 30% of its total trade in goods. Despite the COVID-19 pandemic, total trade in goods between the two entities amounted to €18.6 billion, with EU imports worth €12.6 billion – mostly machinery, transport equipment and chemicals – and EU exports €5.9 billion.

More than 50% of FDI in Kazakhstan originates from the countries of the European Union. The largest sources of FDI out of the EU member states are the Netherlands ($90.4 billion), Switzerland ($25.8 billion), France ($16.1 billion), Italy ($8.7 billion), Belgium ($7.6 billion), and Germany ($5.2 billion).

More than 4,000 companies with European capital and more than 2,000 joint ventures are registered in Kazakhstan.

While in 2006 half of Kazakhstan's $7.3 billion of foreign direct investment came from the EU, by 2019 this had increased to almost €64 billion of EU FDI.

In 2024, Kazakhstan became the third-largest crude oil supplier to the European Union, exporting approximately 1.05 million barrels per day, which accounted for 11.5% of the EU’s total crude oil imports of 9.1 million barrels per day. This positioned Kazakhstan behind only the United States and Norway, which supplied 15.4% and 12.1% respectively.

== Cooperation ==
The Partnership and Cooperation Agreement (PCA) with Kazakhstan has been the legal framework for EU–Kazakhstan bilateral relations since it entered into force in 1999. In November 2006 a Memorandum of Understanding on cooperation in the field of energy between the EU and Kazakhstan has been signed establishing the basis for enhanced cooperation. Kazakhstan recognizes increased economic and political integration as key to its modernization and development.

The future European Commission assistance will focus on the following priority areas: promotion of the ongoing reform process at political, economic, judiciary and social level, infrastructure building, and cooperation in the energy sector.

The overall EU co-operation objectives, policy responses and priority fields for Central Asia can be found in the EC Regional Strategy Paper for Central Asia 2007–2013. In addition to the assistance under the Development Cooperation Instrument (DCI), Kazakhstan participates in several ongoing regional programs.

The Cooperation Council between the European Union (EU) and Kazakhstan held its fourteenth meeting on Tuesday, March 3, 2015. The meeting was chaired by Kazakhstan's Foreign Minister Erlan A. Idrissov, and the EU delegation was led by Latvia's Foreign Minister Edgars Rinkēvičs. The EU reiterated its support for the membership of the Republic of Kazakhstan of the WTO. In November 2015, Kazakhstan joined the WTO as its 162nd member state following the EU’s support for its accession.

In 2014, Kazakhstan became the first Central Asian country to join the Asia-Europe Meeting (ASEM).

A conference was held in Astana titled “25 Years of European Union – Central Asia Relations: From the Past to the Future" where EU Special Representative for Central Asia Ambassador Peter Burian affirmed the European Union's financial and political commitment to Kazakhstan and the Central Asia region.

The EU launched in November 2019 three programmes promoting regional integration in Central Asia. The programmes' budget amounts to 28 million euros ($30.8 million). They will support the rule of law, trade, investment and growth in the region in keeping with the new EU Strategy for Central Asia.

Kazakhstan and the European Union maintain active cooperation, with recent engagements focusing on regional stability, trade, and connectivity. On 28 March 2025, EU High Representative for Foreign Affairs Kaja Kallas visited Almaty to meet President Kassym-Jomart Tokayev and Foreign Minister Murat Nurtleu. Her visit follows the 20th EU-Central Asia Ministerial meeting in Ashgabat and precedes the first EU-Central Asia Summit in Samarkand on April 3-4. Key discussion topics included the impact of Russia’s war on Ukraine, transport, digital connectivity, critical raw materials, and energy. Kallas will also meet leaders from Turkmenistan, Tajikistan, and Uzbekistan during her regional tour.

== Cooperation in green economy ==
In 2015, the European Union and Kazakhstan launched a Project on Supporting Kazakhstan's transition towards Green Economy model. The project is funded by the European Union and is implemented by the United Nations Development Programme (UNDP) as the lead organization, in partnership with UNECE.

The overall objective of the Project is to contribute to Kazakhstan's long-term environmental sustainability and inclusive economic development, supporting the country's transition to a Green Economy Model.

During the 18th meeting of the EU-Kazakhstan Cooperation Council in May 2021 held in Brussels, the EU signalled interest in expanding cooperation to areas such as "environmental protection, achieving carbon neutrality, and combating climate change." Via the European Bank for Reconstruction and Development (EBRD), the EU is already working with Kazakhstan on financing the construction of a 76 MWp solar plant in the Karaganda region, under the EBRD’s €500 million Kazakhstan Renewables Framework that was established in 2016.

The EU is also funding an early-phase project in support of sustainable tourism in the country, which focuses on "sustainable consumption and production practices in the tourism sector" in Kazakhstan.

== Human Rights Dialogue ==
In April 2008, Kazakhstan and the EU marked an agreement to begin human rights dialogue. Human Rights Dialogues are an instrument of the EU's external policy and are designed to discuss questions of mutual interest and enhance cooperation on human rights, as well as launch initiatives to improve the relevant human rights situation. In line with this agreement, the EU held its first structured dialogues on human rights with Kazakhstan in October 2008. The latest EU-Kazakhstan Human Rights Dialogue was held in November 2020.

The European Union provides economic and technical assistance to Kazakhstan through the European Instrument for Democracy and Human Rights (EIDHR). The EU budgets €1 million per year for a variety of projects in Kazakhstan that support Kazakhstan's ongoing legal reforms and strengthening the role of civil society.

== Accession of Kazakhstan to the European Union ==
Countries that could join the European Union Current members Candidate countries Applicant / potential candidate countries Membership possible Membership not possible

Kazakhstan has a westward extension, which makes a strong case geographically for its European status, and potential for eventual EU membership. In 2009, the ambassador of Kazakhstan to Russia, Adilbek Dzhaksybekov said "We would like to join in the future the European Union, but to join not as Estonia and Latvia, but as an equal partner". This statement was about a long-term perspective, because currently Kazakhstan is not even participating in the European Neighbourhood Policy (ENP) although the Kazakh Foreign Ministry has expressed interest in the ENP. MEP Charles Tannock has suggested Kazakhstan's inclusion in the ENP, while emphasizing that "there are still concerns regarding democracy and human rights in Kazakhstan".

The debate regarding Kazakhstan being "European" has been a central topic in the debate of its possible entry, with some figures such as Svante E. Cornell and Johan Engvall, supporting the view that Kazakhstan has the potential and the characteristics to "be considered European" and to be considered a potential protagonist of the EU Neighbourhood policy and perhaps even membership. He stated his views in a 70 page document. The ISDP (Institute for Security & Development Policy), on the basis of Svante's evaluation, defined Kazakhstan as a "European Country" in 2017.

On 1 February 2023, Azat Peruashev stated, on behalf of the Aq Jol, that Kazakhstan should strive towards European standards of living and democracy, and that his party aimed to join the EU as a member state.

== Cooperation in judicial sphere ==
Kazakhstan and the EU launched a three-year project titled "Enhancing Criminal Justice in Kazakhstan" (EUCJ) in October 2015. The total budget of the project allocated by the EU was 5.5 million euros. The EUCJ sought to promote the rule of law and reform Kazakhstan's judiciary system. At the conference marking the completion of the project, EUCJ Strategic Director Bill Mazer noted: “All of the project’s objectives... were fulfilled ahead of time.”

During the annual Subcommittee on Justice and Home Affairs held in November 2020, EU officials welcomed President Tokayev’s announcements concerning a new stage of reforms geared towards improving "law enforcement, the judicial system and prioritizing human rights", and stressed the importance of an independent justice system.

== Culture and education ==
Kazakh cultural centre Til Kazyna (Language is treasure) opened in Brussels, Belgium in June 2020. The new center was established to promote cultural exchange and cooperation through providing language classes, organizing various seminars and workshops on Kazakh art and cuisine.

Kazakhstan is the main beneficiary of the EU's Erasmus+ program, which amounted for €115 million for higher education cooperation with Central Asia for the 2014-2020 period. By the end of 2020 some 3,400 Kazakh students and staff are expected to have come to Europe to study or teach, while Kazakh institutions will have hosted over 1,500 Europeans.

== Kazakhstan's foreign relations with EU member states ==
- Austria
- Belgium
- Bulgaria
- Croatia
- Cyprus
- Czech Republic
- Denmark
- Estonia
- Finland
- France
- Germany
- Greece
- Hungary
- (Republic of Ireland) Ireland
- Italy
- Latvia
- Lithuania
- Luxembourg
- Malta
- Netherlands
- Poland
- Portugal
- Romania
- Slovakia
- Slovenia
- Spain
- Sweden

== See also ==
- Foreign relations of the European Union
- Foreign relations of Kazakhstan
