= Pavlos P. Nerantzis =

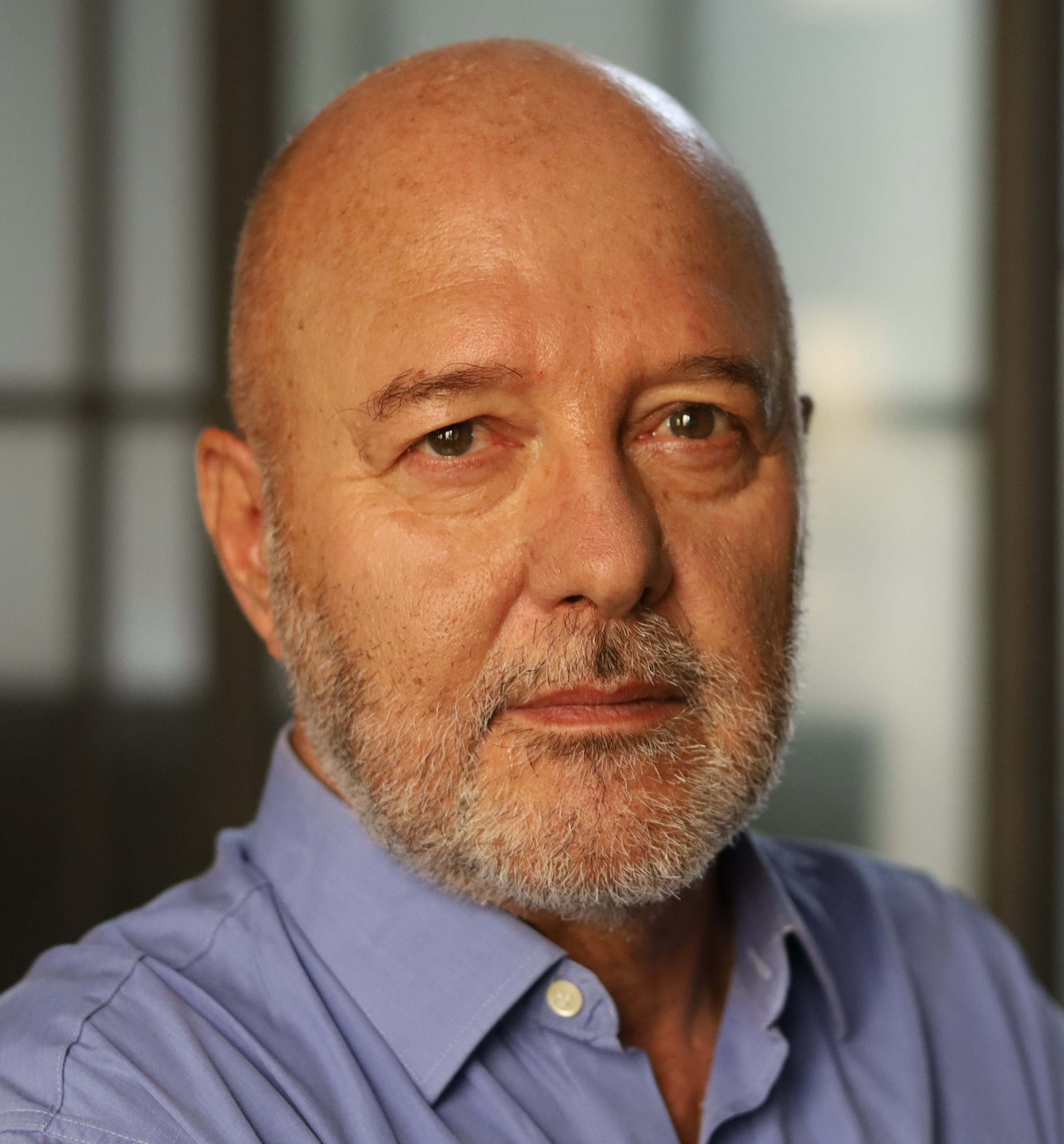
- Born: October 28, 1952 (age 74); Thessaloniki, Greece
- Occupations: Journalist; War correspondent Television presenter Documentary filmmaker

Pavlos P. Nerantzis (Thessaloniki, October 28, 1952) is a Greek journalist, television presenter, and documentary filmmaker. He holds a PhD from the Department of Journalism and Mass Communications of the Aristotle University of Thessaloniki (AUTH).

Since 1982, he has been covering wars and crises as a special correspondent in Latin America, the Balkans, the Middle East, and Asia, investigating major issues of concern to Greek and international public opinion (refugees, terrorism, human rights, mass media, the food chain, climate crisis, etc.). Several of his 50 documentaries have been awarded at international festivals.

== Biography ==
A graduate of the 5th Boys' High School of Thessaloniki, Nerantzis studied electronic engineering at the University of Bologna and journalism at the "Carlo Bo" University of Urbino.

During the time when Italy was experiencing the Years of Lead and the strategy of tension, he began his journalistic career with a bilingual broadcast on Radio Alice, the first free non-state radio station.

In March 1977, when a carabinieri in Bologna killed the student and member of Lotta Continua, Francesco Lorusso, Nerantzis, along with other contributors of the radio station, broadcast live the clashes between police forces and thousands of students, an event characterized by Umberto Eco as "a revolution in the way journalism is practiced". Following the violent closure of Radio Alice by state authorities, he collaborated with Radio Città Fujiko and Radio Informazione in Bologna for drafting news bulletins.

Upon his return to Greece in the late 1970s, he was accredited as a correspondent for the Italian newspaper Il manifesto, a position he held until the end of August 2015.

In the early 1980s, he began collaborating with the magazine Anti and the newspaper Avgi. In March 1982, as a special envoy for Avgi, he was the only Greek journalist to cover the sham elections and the civil war in El Salvador, during which foreign media correspondents were assassinated.

=== Radio ===
His collaboration with the ERT began with the Radio Station of Macedonia, where for five years (1982–1987) he organized round-table discussions, "Contemporary Issues" (Synchrona Themata), with the participation of prominent figures of public life.

From March 1986 to October 1988, he was the editor-in-chief and presented, along with Popi Tsapanidou, Nikos Aslanidis, Periklis Stellas, and Stavros Pasakos, the first live daily broadcast in Northern Greece, "We Are On Air" (Eimaste ston Aera).

In the early stages of non-state radio development, he drafted a study for the news program of the Inter-municipal Radio Station "Enato Kyma" (Ninth Wave) and participated in the Greek delegation at the World Conference of Community Radio Broadcasters of AMARC (World Association of Community Radio Broadcasters), organized in 1988 in Nicaragua.

From September 1989 to September 1992, he worked at Radio Paratiritis as the editor-in-chief and presenter of the main midday magazine featuring the commentary of the day, conducting interviews with at least 500 leading figures of political, economic, and cultural life, some of which made newspaper front pages.

Later, he collaborated with Flash 9.61, and for the three-year period 2003-2005, on 9.58 and 102fm of ERT3, he presented the weekly show "Out of Bounds, Pages from the diary of Pavlos Nerantzis" (Ektos Orion), featuring analyses and personal experiences from his missions in war zones.

In 2005, he actively participated in the creation of the Journalists' Network Against Racism of ESIEM-TH and in drafting a study on community radio in Europe, aiming at the operation of community radio stations in Athens and Thessaloniki.

From April 2011 to October 2012, he was the director of radio (102FM, 9.58, and shortwave) of ERT3 and since 2013 he has been a correspondent for RAI 3 Mondo.

=== Television and MIXER ===
With the establishment of the third channel of the public broadcaster in 1987, Nerantzis worked as a political and diplomatic editor, and subsequently as the editor-in-chief of the main newscast.

On ERT3, he also presented the informative programs "Theses-Antitheses", "Anatomy of an Issue", "Logos, Dialogos, Antilogos", "Documento", "Clarifications" (Aposafiniseis), and "Opinions... Tonight" (Apopseis... Apopse), covering international and Greek issues with guests from the fields of politics, economy, and science.

As a special envoy for ERT3 and other media outlets, he covered the fall of Nicolae Ceaușescu's regime in Romania (1989), the clashes between Saddam Hussein's forces and Kurdish Peshmerga in Iraqi Kurdistan (1991), the civil conflicts in Croatia (1991), Bosnia (1992–1995) and Kosovo (1998–1999), the pyramid scheme rebellion in Albania (1997), the war on terror in Afghanistan (2001), and the Iraq War (2003).

During the same period, he covered Summits of the EEC and later the European Union, other International Organizations, elections, as well as major foreign policy issues (Greek-American and Greek-Turkish relations with an emphasis on the Cyprus dispute).

In 1996, as a member of the organizing committee of the motorcyclists' march from Berlin to Kyrenia, organized by the Cypriot Motorcyclists' Federation on the occasion of the 22nd anniversary of the Turkish invasion of Cyprus, he was one of the two mainland Greeks who participated in a meeting at the presidential palace under the Cypriot president of the Republic, Glafcos Clerides. This meeting led to the cancellation of the march to the occupied territories and the subsequent assassination of Tassos Isaac by Turkish nationalists, after a group of motorcyclists disagreed with the decision and attempted to proceed peacefully towards the Green Line.

In 1995, he created and presented, alongside Chrysa Arapoglou, the weekly magazine "Nostos" for the Greek diaspora, and a year later he assumed the position of News Director at the public television's third channel, a post he held until his resignation in 2000. During these years, collaboration was developed with television stations in Balkan countries, and for the first time, a weekly broadcast in Albanian and Russian was presented to meet the information needs of immigrants from Albania and former Soviet Union countries.

From the mid-1990s, he began writing the script and presenting "Mixer", a documentary series of investigative journalism covering cutting-edge issues of concern to Greek and international public opinion.

In 2002, the newspaper Kathimerini included Mixer among the six best programs on Greek television. In 2003, Vima TVGuide described the documentary "Truth is Bombarded", about the relationship between mass media and war, as very good, and in 2004, Vimagazino called the documentary "Kitsch in the Junta" "amazing". Similarly positive comments were written in 2003 by the NKUA professor and art historian Manos Stefanidis in Eleftherotypia regarding the documentary "My Life in the Red Brigades", and in 2004, for "Trafficking Women" concerning the trafficking of women in Greece and the Balkans.

Pavlos Nerantzis was awarded by the European Association of Regional Television (CIRCOM) for his travelogue in occupied Cyprus titled "On the Unseen Side of Aphrodite" (2003), directed by Vasilis Katsikis, and by the International Academy of Television and Radio (IATR) for the documentary "Kidnapping in Baghdad" (2006). Excerpts from the documentary "The Roads of Refuge" have been broadcast by the BBC, and "Death Traps" about landmines in Evros by the second channel of German television.

In 2006, he traveled to Sumatra, at the epicenter of the tsunami, on the island of Simeulue, to investigate the scandal regarding humanitarian aid for the victims for the documentary "Tsunami: Where Did the Aid Go?".

The same year, at the Patras International Film Festival, he received the best human rights film award for the documentary "In the Spider's Web", directed by Nikos Vezyrgiannis, which exposed the illegal CIA flights in Greece.

Following the broadcast of these documentaries, the General Directorate of ERT3 decided to almost eliminate the monthly production expenses, resulting in the cancellation of Mixer. Members of Parliament Tasos Kourakis (SYRIZA) and Haris Kastanidis (PASOK) submitted a relevant question, to which the then-minister Theodoros Roussopoulos replied (12/11/2007) that "the program Mixer was not canceled by the ERT3 Management, but by the production pace, for which solely its producer is responsible".

The documentary "The List of Silence" that followed as an independent production presented for the first time testimonies of relatives and the list of Greeks murdered by the Videla junta in Argentina, winning the best editing award at the Granada Festival (2011).

=== Newspapers – Magazines – Websites ===
Nerantzis worked for the newspapers Avgi, Egnatia, Angelioforos (Thessaloniki), National Herald (New York), Paese Sera (Rome), and Europa (Rome).

In 2009, as a special envoy for Avgi, he covered the Israeli bombings in Gaza and revealed the transport of banned American-made white phosphorus munitions to Israel via the port of Astakos, contradicting the claims of the Karamanlis government at the time.

He is a founding member and publishing director of the monthly magazine Prooptiki (1981–1984), participated for many years on the editorial board of the research and critique magazine Tetradia, and wrote articles for Tetarto (1985–1987) published by Manos Hatzidakis, and Nea Oikologia (1994–1999).

His articles were published in the magazines Enotita, Dekapenthimeros Politis, Antitheseis, Tachydromos, Miniaia Epitheorisi, Oikotopia, Elliniki Diaspora, Close Up, Info, Elliniko Panorama, Plateia, Wine Plus, Geotropio (Eleftherotypia), Mandragoras, L'Espresso (Rome), and Il Discobolo (Rome).

In 2010, he created the website pressinaction.gr alongside a team of journalists and academics, which ran until 2012.

Since 2013, he has been writing articles for the websites tvxs.gr and parallaximag.gr.

At the ENA Institute for Alternative Policies, where he is a research associate, he wrote about the refugee crisis amidst the pandemic and the propaganda war in Ukraine. His interview with Evangelos Vitzilaios regarding the role of media in wartime was republished on various websites and translated by the international news agency Pressenza into English, German, French, and Spanish.

=== Other activities ===
Nerantzis taught as a visiting professor at the School of Journalism and Mass Communications of the Aristotle University of Thessaloniki.

He has given lectures at conferences in Greece and abroad on the role of the media, war, and terrorism. He has collaborated with Amnesty International (London) and is a member of the organization Doctors of the World.

In 2006, he was a candidate for city councilor with Yiannis Boutaris's "Initiative for Thessaloniki" ticket, and in 2023 with Spyros Pegas's "Thessaloniki for All" ticket. Since 2024, he has been a member of the municipal movement "Ecology - Solidarity".

In the Journalists' Union of Macedonia and Thrace Daily Newspapers (ESIEMTH), he is a member of the secondary Ethics Council and a regular member of the Foreign Press Association (FPA).

== Distinctions ==
In 2004, the then President of the Republic, Kostis Stephanopoulos, awarded him the Botsis Foundation prize "for his investigations, as well as for the ethos and completeness with which he has covered wars for two decades and issues related to Hellenism around the world".

He has received honorary distinctions for "his contribution to the battle of information" from the World Council of Hellenes Abroad (1995), the Hellenic-Italian Alumni Association of Italian Universities (2003), the Rotary Club of Thessaloniki (2003), and the Palestine Liberation Organization (PLO) (2009). In 2006, Avlaia magazine awarded him as the "best journalist of the year".

In 2016, he drafted the Charter of Idomeni, a code of ethics for vulnerable social groups, which was adopted by ESIEM-TH, other Journalists' Unions, the European Federation of Journalists, the OSCE, the United Nations High Commissioner for Refugees (UNHCR), the Hellenic League for Human Rights, the Department of Journalism and Mass Communications of AUTH, news organizations, and NGOs.

In this context, the Charter of Idomeni Network organizes seminars aimed primarily at journalists, educators, and journalism students, while for one year it recorded how the media covers issues related to refugees, migrants, and asylum seekers.

In 2017, Nerantzis presented the Charter of Idomeni at an event in the Italian Parliament and in 2021 at an international conference on migration narrative organized in Paris by the International Centre for Migration Policy Development in collaboration with the French government and the Club of Venice.

== Selected works ==
- (2022) The Truth is Bombarded. The Media and War through the Eyes of a War Correspondent (Η αλήθεια βομβαρδίζεται. Τα ΜΜΕ και ο πόλεμος με το βλέμμα ενός πολεμικού ανταποκριτή), Papazisis Publishers, Athens, ISBN 978-960-02-3679-8. The book outlines the role of powerful news organizations and war correspondents in covering armed conflicts. It is an experiential narrative with a strong reflective mood, applying the method of autoethnography for the first time in communication science, while also being the result of a long-term research effort to record fake news, propaganda, and censorship in the biggest wars that shook the world from the 19th to the 21st century.
- (2007) Traces of War (Ίχνη Πολέμου), Municipality of Thessaloniki Publications, ISBN 978-960-6602-52-8. The homonymous photography exhibition was presented in Thessaloniki (43rd Dimitria festival), Chania, Heraklion, Gonnoi, and Istanbul, European Capital of Culture (2010).
- (1983) People with Special Needs. Institutions and Mentalities (Άτομα με ειδικές ανάγκες. Θεσμοί και Νοοτροπίες), "Society of Spastics of Northern Greece" Publications, Thessaloniki.

=== Contribution to collective works ===
- (2017) Public Sphere in Crisis - Racism and xenophobia in the Greek media (1990-2016) (Δημόσια Σφαίρα σε Κρίση - Ο ρατσισμός και η ξενοφοβία στα ελληνικά ΜΜΕ), Papazisis Publishers, Athens, ISBN 978-960-02-3318-6.
- (2013) Human Pain and Existential Questioning - The Pain of the Other in the Media (Ανθρώπινος Πόνος και Υπαρξιακός Προβληματισμός - Ο Πόνος του Άλλου στα ΜΜΕ), Afoi Kyriakidi Publishers, Thessaloniki, ISBN 978-960-467-467-1.
- (2005) Vivere Pericolosamente – 26 Stories from Italy (Vivere Pericolosamente – 26 Ιστορίες από την Ιταλία), Antitypos Publishers, Athens, ISBN 9608678552.
- (2004) Migration in Cinema – The Greece of Refugees (Η μετανάστευση στον κινηματογράφο – Η Ελλάδα των προσφύγων), Papazisis Publishers, Athens, ISBN 978-960-02-1793-3.
- (2004) Writing for peace on both sides of the Aegean (Γράφοντας για την ειρήνη στις δύο πλευρές του Αιγαίου), Nikos Poulantzas Institute Publications, Athens.
- (1990) Ecology, City, Local Government – Tracing on the airwaves (Οικολογία, Πόλη, Αυτοδιοίκηση – Ιχνηλατώντας στα ερτζιανά), Ecological Information Office Publications, Thessaloniki.
- (1987) Juvenile offenders - Press and Criminality (Οι νεαροί παραβάτες - Τύπος και Εγκληματικότητα), Municipality of Thessaloniki Publications, Thessaloniki.
