= Hellenic Bankers Association UK =

The Hellenic Bankers Association UK (HBA-UK) is a London-based nonprofit professional organisation that promotes cooperation among bankers and financial services professionals of Hellenic origin working in the United Kingdom. Founded in 1994, the association provides a platform for networking, professional development, and dialogue between members of the Greek and Cypriot financial diaspora and the broader financial community in London. ￼

Headquartered in London, the association operates primarily within the financial services sector and seeks to foster collaboration between financial professionals, policymakers, and business leaders connected to Greece and Cyprus. Through events, discussions, and initiatives, it aims to strengthen ties between the United Kingdom’s financial centre and the Greek economic and business community.

== History ==
The Hellenic Bankers Association UK was established on 25 May 1994 with the objective of promoting closer cooperation among bankers and financial professionals of Hellenic origin working in the United Kingdom. The founding initiative was led by George P. Matsakas, together with Kleanthis G. Kotsiofides and George Solomonides, who sought to create a structured network for Greek and Cypriot professionals working in the City of London. ￼

At its founding meeting, a core membership of 31 registered members adopted the association’s constitution, name, and logo, and elected the first executive committee for a two-year term. The committee consisted of nine members, including Matsakas as chairman, and was tasked with developing the organisation’s structure and building a professional network within London’s financial sector. ￼

During its early years, the association organised networking events and outreach initiatives aimed at bringing together professionals working across competing financial institutions, while fostering cooperation within the Greek diaspora in the United Kingdom. Membership expanded rapidly during this period, establishing the foundation for the organisation’s ongoing activities and influence within the community.

== Mission and objectives ==
The association’s primary mission is to promote cooperation and dialogue among bankers, investors, and other financial professionals of Hellenic origin based in the United Kingdom. It seeks to encourage knowledge exchange and professional collaboration within the financial services industry. ￼

HBA-UK also aims to act as a bridge between London’s financial centre and the Greek political, economic, and business communities. By facilitating dialogue and networking, the organisation supports entrepreneurship, economic engagement, and investment relationships between the United Kingdom and Greece.

In addition, the association promotes professional development and thought leadership through conferences, seminars, and panel discussions that address developments in global financial markets and the broader economic environment.

== Activities ==
The Hellenic Bankers Association UK organises a range of professional and networking activities including conferences, panel discussions, seminars, and social events. These events bring together senior financial executives, policymakers, academics, and members of the Hellenic diaspora to discuss developments in banking, investment, and economic policy.

Over the years, the association has hosted discussions and events featuring prominent figures in business, economics, and government. Participants have included senior policymakers and financial leaders such as Petros Doukas, Spyros Capralos, George Papakonstantinou, and Yannis Stournaras, among others.

The organisation also hosts networking events that encourage cross-border dialogue and cooperation between business communities, often bringing together diplomats, financial executives, and entrepreneurs to explore investment and trade opportunities between countries and regions.

== Membership ==
Membership in the Hellenic Bankers Association UK is open to professionals working in financial services and related industries in the United Kingdom. The organisation offers several membership categories, including regular, associate, and corporate memberships. ￼

Members gain access to exclusive events, industry discussions, and networking opportunities with professionals across banking, asset management, investment banking, and other areas of financial services. The association also provides professional development opportunities, including mentorship programmes and career-focused events.

== Governance and structure ==
The association is governed by an Executive Committee, which oversees the organisation’s strategy, operations, and programming. Committee members typically hold senior roles across the financial services industry and contribute to the association’s initiatives through various specialised committees.

In addition to the executive leadership, the organisation maintains a Chairman’s Circle, an advisory body composed of prominent figures from banking, finance, and public life. This group provides guidance to the Executive Committee and contributes to the association’s strategic direction.

=== Executive committee (2024–2026) ===
Xenofon Zacharoudis	Chairman and Head of the Executive Committee
Alexandros Tsourinakis	Vice Chairman and Head of Management Committee
Fay Konstantinidi	Head of Global Relations and Diaspora Engagement Committee
Georgia Tsiavou	Head of Community and Membership Committee
George Sotiropoulos	Head of Communications Committee
Katerina Ilia	Head of Events Committee
Demetri Nikolias	Head of Innovation and Development Committee

=== Chairman’s Circle (advisory body) ===
Christos Megalou	Chief Executive Officer, Piraeus Bank
Notis Mitarakis	Minister of Migration and Asylum, Hellenic Republic
George Matsakas	Founder of HBA-UK and Chairman of the First Executive Committee
Efstratios (Stratos) Chatzigiannis	Former Chairman of HBA-UK
Michail Zekkos	Former Chairman of HBA-UK
Andreas Zobanakis	Former Chairman of HBA-UK
Antonis Ntatzopoulos	Former Chairman of HBA-UK
Louis Loizou	Former Chairman of HBA-UK
Yiannis Kyriakopoulos	Former Chairman of HBA-UK

== International branches ==
Themis Agathocleous	Head of HBA-UK Cyprus Branch
Calliope Fragkogianni	Head of HBA-UK Zurich Branch

== Social responsibility and community initiatives ==
Beyond its professional networking activities, the Hellenic Bankers Association UK engages in social responsibility initiatives aimed at supporting education and charitable causes. One of its key initiatives is the HBA-UK Student Award, which supports students from Greece and Cyprus pursuing studies or careers in finance in the United Kingdom.

The association also collaborates with charitable organisations and foundations working to support social and economic development initiatives in Greece and internationally.

== Presence and recognition ==
Over time, the Hellenic Bankers Association UK has developed into a prominent networking platform for financial professionals of Greek and Cypriot origin working in London, widely regarded as Europe’s leading financial centre.

The association has also expanded its international presence through additional branches and collaborations with financial professionals in other financial hubs, reflecting the global nature of the Hellenic financial diaspora.
