= Greeks in Uzbekistan =

Greek people in Uzbekistan

Total population
- 10,453 (1989, census)

Related ethnic groups
- Greeks in Kazakhstan, Greeks in Kyrgyzstan

The Greeks in Uzbekistan number approximately 9,000. The community is made up of Greeks from Russia who were deported by force from that country to Uzbekistan in the 1940s, and political refugees from Greece. The biggest Greek community in the country is in the capital city of Tashkent where most of the Greek political refugees were relocated by the Soviet authorities.

== History ==
Historical population
Year	Pop.	±%
1959	20,047	—
1970	32,422	+61.7%
1979	14,025	−56.7%
1989	10,453	−25.5%

In ancient times the south of modern day Uzbekistan was part of the Hellenistic Seleucid Kingdom, but the few Greek communities from that time assimilated into the general population over time.

Mass population transfers in the Soviet Union led to the displacement of thousands of Pontic Greeks and Greek communists in the 1940s, creating a sizable Greek diaspora in Central Asia. Following the persecution and mass killing of the Greek Operation starting in the late 1930s, mass deportations of Soviet Greeks took place throughout the 1940s, forcing over 30,000 Greeks of Crimea and the larger Black Sea region into Central Asia, especially to Kazakhstan and Uzbekistan.

After the defeat of the Democratic Army of Greece and the Communist Party of Greece in 1949, another wave of Greeks entered Central Asia, as the Soviet Union sent around 11,000 refugees of the Greek Civil War to Tashkent. Together with about 30,000 Greeks who lived in the country before World War II, the Greek community in Uzbekistan reached a high of some 40,000 in the 1960s.

In the early 1980s, with the decriminalisation of the Greek Communist Party, many returned to Greece, however, there is still a Greek community in Uzbekistan which survives to this day.

== Culture ==
The most important organization representing ethnic Greeks is the Greek Cultural Association of Tashkent. The activities of this organization include Greek language instruction (19 classes with a total of 571 students, classes for adults) and the teaching of Greek dances and music.

== Notable people ==
- Vasilis Hatzipanagis, footballer for Iraklis in the 1970s and 1980s
- Lefteris Pantazis, Greek singer
- Elena Tornikidou, former basketball player
- Evangelos Goussis, Australian kickboxer
- Dimitrios Papadopoulos, Greek former professional footballer
- Yannis Mandzukas, footballer

== See also ==
- Greek people
- Greek diaspora
- Greeks in Kazakhstan
- Greeks in Kyrgyzstan
