= Kazakhstan–Netherlands relations =

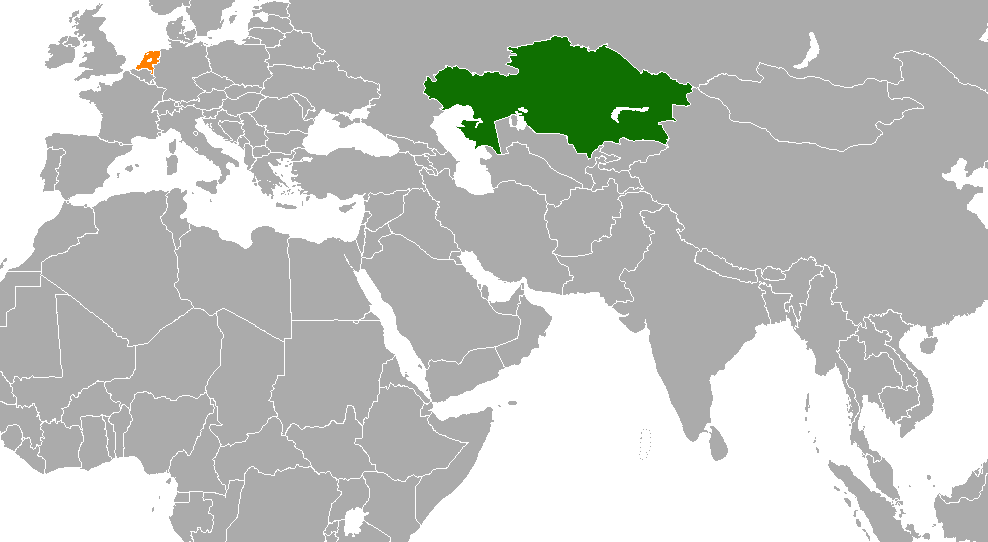

- Kazakhstan: Netherlands

Kazakhstan–Netherlands relations refer to the bilateral relations between Kazakhstan and the Netherlands. There is a Dutch embassy in Astana, as well as a Kazakh embassy in The Hague.

== History ==
Diplomatic relations began on September 10, 1992. In 1996, both countries signed an agreement to ensure fair taxation practices between them. In 2002, both countries signed a bilateral investment treaty to encourage foreign trade.

In 2014, Astanaplein (Astana Square) was announced in Rotterdam, after Nursultan Nazarbayev visited the Netherlands, which opened in 2015. When Dutch Prime Minister Mark Rutte visited Kazakhstan in May 2024, he took part in the opening ceremony of Amsterdam Square, in Astana.

following the GreenTech Aamsterdam 2026 international exhibition, Kazahhaastan and the Netherlands agree a series of joint projects worth 160 million euros.

== Economic relations ==
There is significant trade between the two countries in agriculture, oil, chemicals and machinery sectors.

The Netherlands is the largest source of foreign direct investment into Kazakhstan. $90.4 billion of foreign direct investment was directed from the Netherlands to Kazakhstan from 1991 till 2019. Dutch companies invested $7.3 billion into the economy of Kazakhstan in 2019 accounting for 30.2% of total FDI that year and remaining the biggest investors in Kazakhstan.

A bilateral investment treaty signed in 2002 establishes a framework for fair and equitable treatment of respective investments and capital so to encourage foreign direct investment and trade.

== State visits ==
From 27 to 28 November 2002, the President of Kazakhstan, Nursultan Nazarbayev, paid a state visit to the Kingdom of the Netherlands. During the visit, he held meetings with Queen Beatrix, Prime Minister Jan Peter Balkenende, and the Speakers of the Senate and the House of Representatives of the Dutch Parliament, Gerrit Braks and Frans Weisglas. The program of the visit also included a working breakfast with representatives of leading Dutch companies operating in Kazakhstan, participation in the business forum “Kazakhstan: An Attractive Market for Investment and Trade”, and a visit to a dairy farm.

In March 2014, Nursultan Nazarbayev visited the Netherlands, to participate in the 3rd Nuclear Security Summit.

In 2015, Dutch Prime Minister Mark Rutte met with Nursultan Nazarbayev in Astana, Kazakhstan and affirmed the Enhanced Partnership and Cooperation Agreement between the European Union and Kazakhstan. He visited the city again in 2024, to discuss expanding ties in areas like agriculture, renewable energy, and water management.

== Resident diplomatic missions ==
- Kazakhstan has an embassy in The Hague.
- the Netherlands has an embassy in Astana.

== See also ==
- Foreign relations of Kazakhstan
- Foreign relations of the Netherlands
- Kazakhstan–EU relations
