= Greeks in Kyrgyzstan =

Ethnic group in Kyrgyzstan

Total population
- 451

Languages
- Greek, Kyrgyz, Russian

Related ethnic groups
- Greek diaspora

The Greeks in Kyrgyzstan form one of the country's smaller minority groups. The existing data are contradictory. According to 2009 Census there are 451 Greeks. According to the Greek Ministry of Foreign Affairs, there are 150 families of Greek origin (650–700 people). However, the data of the General Secretariat For Greeks Abroad give an even lower number (50 people).

== History ==
=== Initial settlement ===
According to an official census of 1920, the Greeks of Kyrgyzstan numbered only 344. Since 1939 and during World War II Greeks living in the Soviet Union—most of them were merchants, but there were also some farmers—suffered deportations, mainly to the steppes of Central Asia, particularly to Kazakhstan, Uzbekistan, Kyrgyzstan and Siberia.

For a considerable time after the end of the war, these deported Greeks remained unrehabilitated, and were not allowed to return to their pre-deportation areas of settlement. Thus some of them chose to leave Siberia to settle in Kazakhstan and (to a lesser extent) in Kyrgyzstan. Most of these Greeks were finally concentrated in the Osh province, and the town of Nookat in particular.

During a second wave of deportations (1944–1949) initiated by the Stalinist regime, more than 31,000 families (Pontian Greeks and Greeks from Crimea) were sent to Bishkek; only 5,000 found a shelter living in squalid conditions. This time, the deported Greeks finally settled in the Talas Province.

=== Migration to Greece ===
In early 1990s, the Greek community of Kyrgyzstan was still vibrant, and numbered 3,000 members in all. Nevertheless, from 1985 onward, their number has been decreasing, due to outmigration by Greeks in search of work. According to the statistics, during the 1990s 860 members of the Greek community of Kyrgyzstan (0.57% of the total number of Greek immigrants from the former Soviet Union) settled in Greece.

== Organization ==
The community is represented by the Filia (Friendship) Association of Ethnic Greeks, headed by chairwoman Olga Kupriyanova. According to her, the association has 300 members. They operate a Greek school with a Greek teacher whose salary is covered by the Greek government, Secretariat of Greeks Abroad. The University of Bishkek opened a Greek language department in 2003.

== See also ==
- Greece-Kyrgyzstan relations
- Greeks in Kazakhstan
- Greeks in Uzbekistan
