= Greeks in Denmark =

Small Greek community in Denmark

Total population
- 1,180 (Oct. 2009)

Languages
- Greek, Danish

Related ethnic groups
- Greek diaspora

The Greeks in Denmark are a small community. As of October 2009, Statistics Denmark recorded 1,180 people of Greek origin living in Denmark, with 954 in Zealand, 177 in Jutland, 48 in Funen, and 1 in Bornholm.

== History ==
Unskilled migrants began coming from Evros and Kastoria to Denmark in the 1960s; they worked primarily in the fur trade. Most of those initial migrants have returned to Greece as this sector became economically depressed. Political refugees fleeing the Greek military junta of 1967–1974 were numerically minor, but evoked a great deal of sympathy from the politically liberal Danish population. The number of Greek international students choosing Denmark as their destination showed an uptick after 1981, when Greece became a member of the European Economic Community.

== See also ==
- Denmark–Greece relations
- Greek diaspora
- Immigration to Denmark
- Greeks in Finland
- Greeks in Sweden
