= Greeks in Kazakhstan =

Ethnic group

The Greeks in Kazakhstan are mainly the descendants of Pontic Greeks who were deported there by Joseph Stalin during the deportation of the Soviet Greeks. They came primarily from southern Russia and the Caucasus region; first the Crimean Pontic Greeks in 1944, under the resolution 5984 of June 2, 1944, then the Caucasus Greeks in June 1949, Feb 1950, and Aug 1950. The total number of deported persons was about 60,000 people.

Nowadays there are between 10 and 12 thousand ethnic Greeks living in Kazakhstan in 17 communities, which together with the Kyrgyzstan community make up the FILIA (friendship in Greek) Federation of Greek Communities of Kazakhstan and Kyrgyzstan. The Federation prints a small newspaper, organizes dance events, and offers Greek language and dance classes. At the moment in Kazakhstan there are 6 ethnic Greek teachers funded by the General Secretariat of Greeks Abroad. Furthermore, Greek is taught by two teachers seconded from Greece.

== Demographics ==
Historical population
Year	Pop.	±%
1939	1,374	—
1959	55,543	+3942.4%
1970	39,241	−29.4%
1979	49,930	+27.2%
1989	46,746	−6.4%
1999	12,703	−72.8%
2009	8,846	−30.4%
According to official census data:

== Notable people ==
- Charalambos Cholidis, Greek Olympic wrestler
- Aleksandr Khapsalis, retired Soviet football player
- Evstaphiy Pechlevanidis, retired Soviet and Greek professional football player
- Savvas Kofidis, Greek former football player and football coach
- Ilya Ilyin, weightlifter (Greek Pontian maternal grandfather, Iakovos Fountoukidis)
- Klavdia Papadopoulou, Greek Representative at Eurovision 2025

== See also ==
- Greek diaspora
- Greece–Kazakhstan relations
- Demographics of Kazakhstan
- Greeks in Armenia
- Greeks in Azerbaijan
- Greeks in Uzbekistan
- Greeks in Kyrgyzstan
