= Greece–Kazakhstan relations =

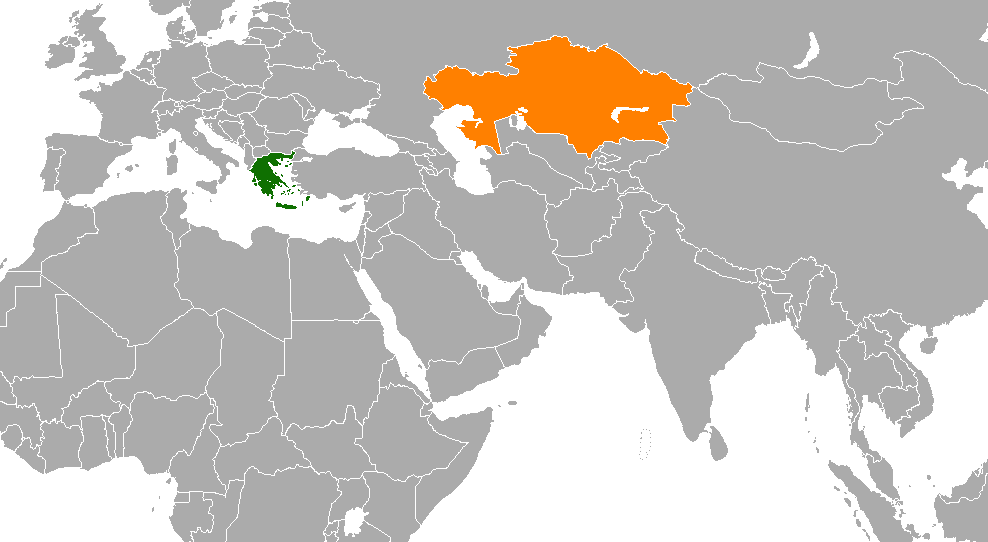

- Greece: Kazakhstan

Greece and Kazakhstan established diplomatic relations on 1 October 1992. Greece opened an embassy in Almaty in February 1997. Kazakhstan opened an embassy in Athens in 2005. Kazakhstan has had an honorary consulate in Athens since 1998.

Kazakhstan has a Greek community of 10,000 to 12,000 people. The Greek community is a valued ethnic group in Kazakhstan's multi-ethnic society. Kazakhstan's diplomats regularly brief Greek officials of the Greek community in Kazakhstan.

Along with communities based in nearby Kyrgyzstan, the expatriate Greeks are served by a "Friendship federation", which publishes a small newspaper and organises social events.

== Political cooperation ==
The two countries have a Kazakhstan - Greece Parliamentary Friendship Group.

== Economic cooperation ==
In addition to a general desire to improve ties and develop trade with the EU, Kazakhstan has particular interest in the Burgas–Alexandroupoli pipeline which will allow the transport of its oil from the Black Sea port of Burgas to the Greek Aegean port of Alexandroupoli, thus providing access to the markets of Southern and Western Europe while bypassing the Bosporus and the Dardanelles. Former Greece president Konstantinos Stephanopoulos has expressed admiration for Kazakhstan and interest in further developing trade.

== Bilateral visits ==
- The President of Kazakhstan, Nursultan Nazarbayev, paid an official visit to Greece on 16–18 July 2001. During the visit, he met with the President of Greece, Konstantinos Stephanopoulos, the Speaker of the Hellenic Parliament, Apostolos Kaklamanis, the Mayor of Athens, Dimitris Avramopoulos, as well as representatives of the Greek business community.

During the visit, President Stephanopoulos awarded Nazarbayev the highest state decoration of the Hellenic Republic, the Order of the Redeemer. Mayor Avramopoulos presented the President of Kazakhstan with the Gold Medal of the City of Athens and invited him to attend the 2004 Summer Olympics as an honorary guest.

- In June 2002, President Konstantinos Stephanopoulos paid an official visit to Kazakhstan, during which he expressed support for the further development of bilateral relations between the two countries.
- In August 2004, Nazarbayev made a working visit to Greece. During the visit, he held meetings with President Konstantinos Stephanopoulos, the President of Romania, Ion Iliescu, former President of the United States George H. W. Bush, former Prime Minister of Israel Shimon Peres, the Mayor of Athens Dora Bakoyannis, and former United States National Security Advisor Brent Scowcroft.

Nazarbayev also attended the opening ceremony of the 2004 Summer Olympics, sporting events involving Kazakhstani athletes, and participated in the opening of the Kazakh Information and Cultural Center.

== Bilateral agreements ==
The Greek parliament ratified in 2017 the European Union's Enhanced Partnership and Cooperation Agreement with Kazakhstan opening wider the door for enhanced trade, FDI and political collaboration between Greece and Kazakhstan.

- Economic and Technological Cooperation Agreement
- Agreement on the Promotion and Protection of Investments.
- The first meeting of the Greek-Kazakh Joint Interministerial Committee was held in July 2006 and a relevant Protocol was signed between the two countries.

== Ambassadors of Greece to Kazakhstan ==
- (the embassy opened in February 1997)
1. Kontantin Tritaris 09/29/1997 – 05/17/2000 (Almaty)
2. Nikolaos Khatupis 07/06/2000 – 22/01/2005 (Almaty)
3. Christ Kontovunisios 02/19/2005 – 09/12/2008 (Almaty)
4. Evangelos Denaksas 11/12/2008 – 31/03/2011 (Almaty - Astana)
5. Efthymios Pandzopoulos 12/28/2011 – 07/10/2016
6. Alexandros Katranis 07/13/2016 – 8/31/2019 (Astana)
7. Adam-Georgios Adamidis 9/22/2019 – present (Nur-Sultan)

== Resident diplomatic mission ==
- Greece has an embassy in Astana.
- Kazakhstan has an embassy in Athens.

== See also ==
- Foreign relations of Greece
- Foreign relations of Kazakhstan
- Greeks in Kazakhstan
- Kazakhstan–EU relations
