= Denmark–Greece relations =

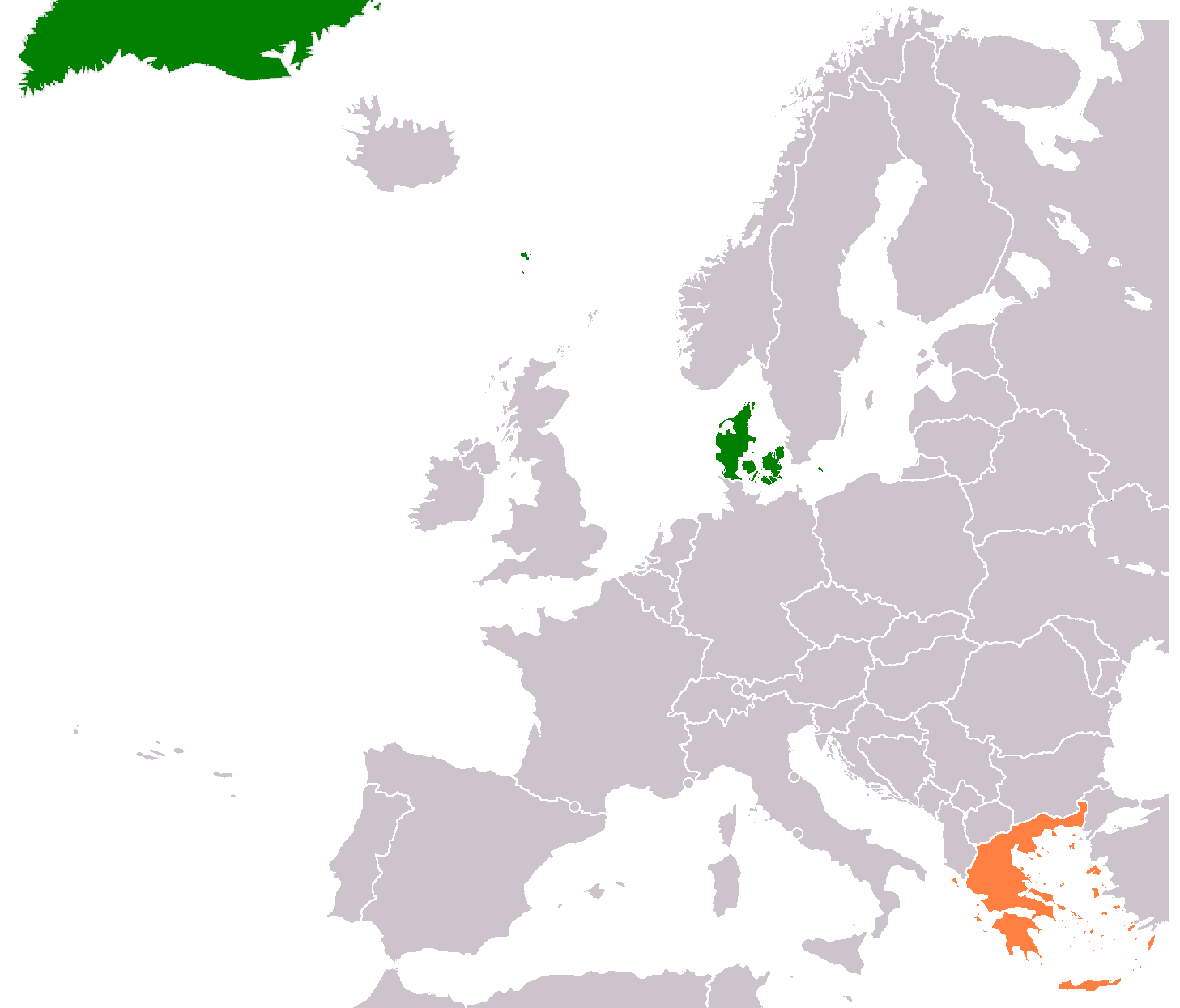
- Denmark: Greece

Diplomatic mission
- Embassy of Denmark, Athens: Embassy of Greece, Copenhagen

Denmark has an embassy in Athens. Greece has an embassy in Copenhagen. Both countries are full members of the Organization for Security and Co-operation in Europe, Organisation for Economic Co-operation and Development, NATO and the European Union.

== History ==
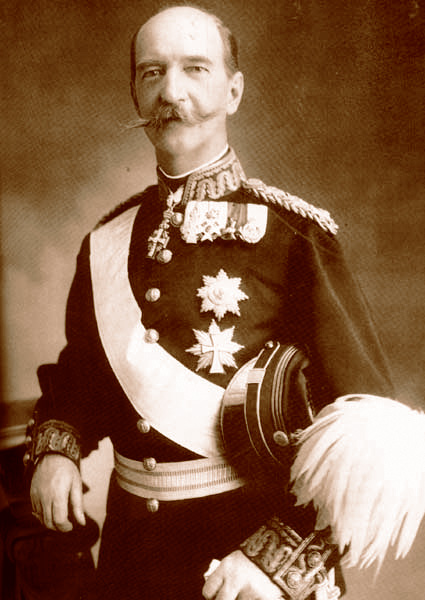
George I of Greece

First contact between Danes and Greeks dates back from the 4th century BC, when Greek merchant Pytheas went to Denmark. In 1863, the second King of Greece, George I, was of Danish descent, and his successors, the House of Glücksburg, reigned over the country until 1973/1974.

In 1967, Denmark and three other countries brought the Greek Case against the Greek junta regime for human rights violations.

In 1992 opened the Danish Institute at Athens.

== List of bilateral treaties and agreements ==
- Conciliation, arbitration and judicial settlement, Athens April 13, 1933
- On the manner of serving legal documents, Athens June 18, 1936
- On the exploitation of regular air transport routes, Athens November 14, 1947
- Trade agreement, Copenhagen February 25, 1949
- Exchange of notes on patents, Athens June 2, 1952
- Abolition of Visa requirement, Athens April 1, 1953
- On reciprocal tax exemption of income gained in shipping or aviation, Athens March 4, 1961
- Cultural cooperation, Athens September 17, 1976
- On international transport with appended Protocol, Copenhagen February 2, 1979
- On the avoidance of double taxation of income or capital, Copenhagen May 18, 1989

== Recent bilateral visits ==
Queen Margrethe II of Denmark attended the Athens Olympic Games in 2004 and she paid an official visit to Greece in May 2006.

== Resident diplomatic missions ==
- Denmark has an embassy in Athens.
- Greece has an embassy in Copenhagen.

== See also ==
- Foreign relations of Denmark
- Foreign relations of Greece
- Greeks in Denmark
