= Greece–Kyrgyzstan relations =

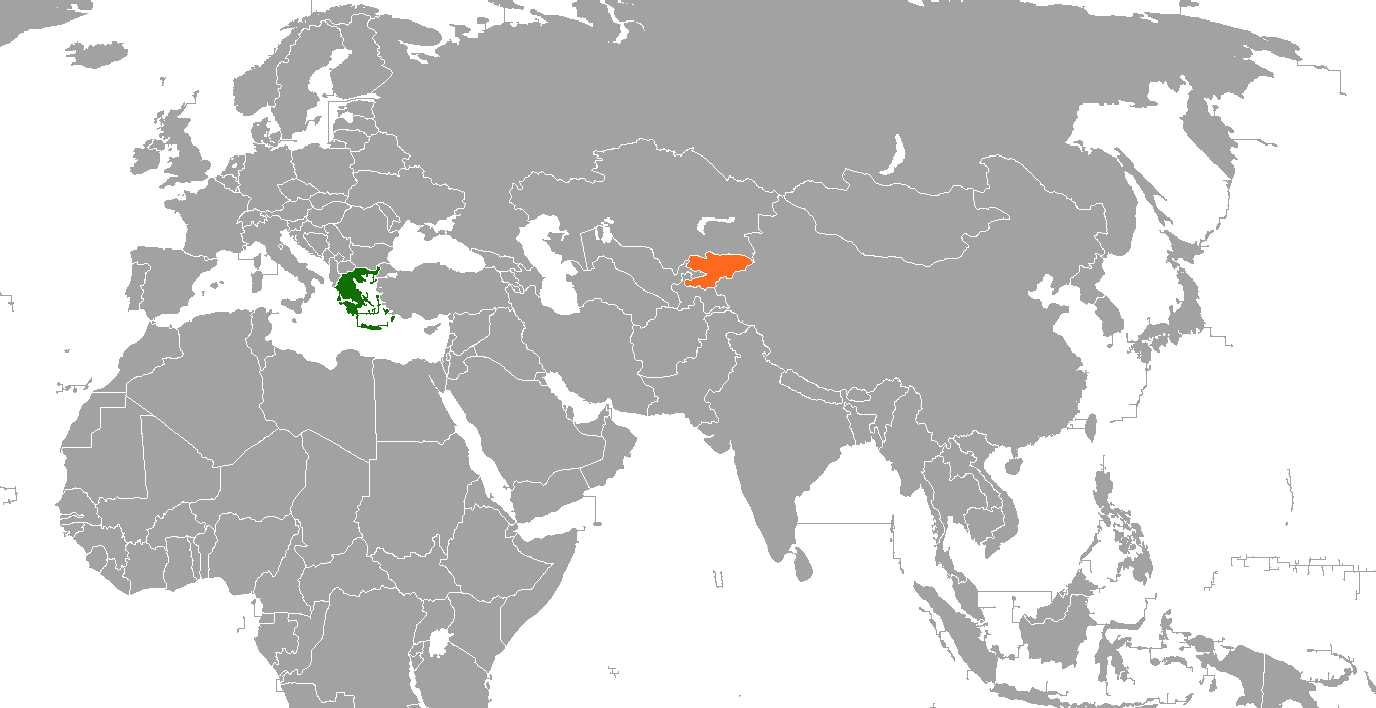

- Greece: Kyrgyzstan

Greece–Kyrgyzstan relations are foreign relations between Greece and Kyrgyzstan. Both countries established diplomatic relations in 1992. Greece is represented in Kyrgyzstan through its embassy in Almaty (Kazakhstan). Kyrgyzstan is represented in Greece through a non resident ambassador based in Bishkek (in the Foreign Ministry). Kyrgyz consular representation in Greece is made by the Kazakh consulate in Athens. What is now Kyrgyzstan was settled by Scythians and was conquered by Alexander the Great.

During the COVID-19 pandemic, Greece donated vaccines to Kyrgyzstan.

== Official visits ==
In 2002, the deputy Kyrgyz foreign minister, Asanbek Osmonaliyev visited Greece to discuss the prospects for "bilateral political cooperation and the possibilities of arranging an official visit by the Kyrgyz president, Askar Akayev, to Greece".

On 1 November 2004 Kyrgyz President Askar Akayev made an official visit to Greece to meet Greek President, Konstantinos Stephanopoulos. Akayev said: "It is 12 years since diplomatic relations between the two countries have been established, and this is a good beginning to build close and efficient cooperation. We have good prospects to raise Kyrgyz-Greek relations to a higher level and expand relations in the international arena. ... The aim of my visit is to raise our relations to a different qualitative level and to lay the foundation for their legal basis by signing bilateral documents." A Foreign Ministry delegation from Greece visited Dushanbe for talks, and had meetings with Tajikistans Foreign Minister Zarifi and First Deputy Foreign Minister Youldashev in 2008. Foreign Minister Dora Bakoyannis met with Tajikistans Foreign Minister Zarifi during the 1st EU-Central Asia Forum on security issues in Paris in September 2008.

== Emigrants ==
Between 650 and 700 people of Greek descent live in Kyrgyzstan; however, the data of the General Secretariat For Greeks Abroad give an even lower number (50 people). See Greeks in Kyrgyzstan for more details.

== Bilateral agreements ==
In 2004, Greece and Kyrgyzstan signed a bilateral agreement for air transport, tourism and diplomacy during Kyrgyz president Askar Akayev's visit to Greece.

== See also ==
- Foreign relations of Greece
- Foreign relations of Kyrgyzstan
- Greeks in Kyrgyzstan
