= Governance of Andreas Papandreou =

During his two terms 1981–1989 and 1993–1996

The governance of Andreas Papandreou during his terms as Prime Minister of Greece (1981–1989 and 1993–1996) is characterized by a populist approach and rooted in personal authority rather than institutional strength.

His administrations prioritized party loyalty over expertise, reinforcing a newly adopted centralized patronage system that distributed public sector jobs to political supporters. Papandreou employed populist rhetoric to galvanize his base, often intensifying political polarization at the expense of democratic norms. However, the weaknesses inherent in his leadership approach led to recurring government inefficiencies, frequent cabinet reshuffles, and corruption scandals that led to early economic and social failures.

== Government structure and management ==
Papandreou had lifelong experience in political campaigning, which few could match in the metapolitefsi era (1974–1990), and had commanding leadership in setting the narrative of Greece in the greater context. However, he had little ministerial experience, and spent little time preparing on how to govern before the 1981 election victory. The lack of experience was exacerbated by two more choices. First, Papandreou chose ministers with no previous ministerial experience but who were also ideologically similar, thus eliminating differences of opinion out of fear of leading to intra-party factionalism, as happened in Iouliana. Second, Papandreou's political party, Panhellenic Socialist Movement (PASOK), passed Law 1232/82 in 1982, which purged senior civil servants from all ministries (eliminating institutional memory) based on the allegation that they were hostile to the new regime, and they were replaced by party loyalists who had little knowledge of how the government worked. The lack of experience in Papandreou's governments led to early failures, with costly economic and social consequences.

Papandreou had unchallenged authority in PASOK to the point of being "authoritarian." He acted as the 'final arbiter,' and he was "ruthless" if he felt threatened. He did not hesitate to silence his intra-party critics with expulsion from PASOK, followed by a character assassination from the pro-PASOK press and even state media. His grip on the government and his party started to weaken after the Koskotas scandal.

Papandreou experimented with various government structures (both in size and form) and restarted the government frequently as he holds the record for the most ministerial reshuffles (13 times in 1981–1989, with over 100 people changing various ministerial positions). Papandreou found the day-to-day government management less interesting (especially after 1983) and instead focused on the grant narratives of Greece's democratization process. Limited access to Papandreou (especially in later years), lack of guidance, and fluid organizational structure left his ministers spending valuable time decoding what their 'Leader' wanted. Ministers who have worked with Papandreou have recorded their frustration at Ministerial Councils, where Papandreou would not disagree with anyone. These choices reflected his aversion to institutional development, and he instead opted for personality (reactive) politics to be the cohesive force that kept PASOK together. The result was that Papandreou's governments were dysfunctional and lacked coordination, with ministers having little or no time until the next reshuffle to implement campaign promises. The fluid government style of Papandreou, both in structure and in personnel, also made his governments vulnerable to corruption, as the Koskotas scandal proved.

== Populism and patronage ==
Both major parties in the Metapolitefsi era, New Democracy and PASOK, promoted an inclusive society, but PASOK held an advantage due to Papandreou's populist rhetoric. He framed Greek history through stark binaries, Left vs. Right, privileged vs. underprivileged, intentionally deepening political polarization. Papandreou and his inner circle often invoked the trauma of the Greek Civil War, appealing to the "revenge of the losers [of the Civil War]" (Greek: "η ρεβάνς των ηττημένων") narrative to reassure left-leaning supporters that PASOK remained true to its roots. He claimed to empower the 'underprivileged' through his leadership, even at the expense of democratic institutions, once declaring: "There are no institutions – only the people rule this country." His populism included vilifying opponents and blaming conservatives for the Civil War (1946–1949) and the junta (1967–1974): "Greek people never forget what the Right has done." With little policy difference between the two parties, Mitsotakis eventually adopted similar populist tactics, further intensifying polarization. By 1985, The Economist described Greece as a "country divided," tearing open wounds of Civil War. Papandreou's populism also extended into his foreign policy rhetoric (see foreign policy).

The class struggle that Papandreou campaigned on had little basis in reality according to Costas Simitis, it was instead part of old-fashioned patronage politics. Papandreou transformed the localized voter-patron relation, where the patrons were local aristocratic families, into a centralized national machine where the state controlled by PASOK became the source of patronage. He rewarded his loyal supporters with civil service jobs to an unprecedented degree. Papandreou's generosity depended on PASOK's performance in the polls. One day before the 1989 elections and as the scandals were closing in, he gave a public command to the Minister of Finance Dimitris Tsovolas to "give it all [to them]" (Greek: Τσοβόλα δώσ'τα όλα), implying to empty the state coffers, and the gathered crowd chanted this back. Later on, Papandreou claimed that he was joking, but this event became an infamous moment of the era.

The mass-scale patronage from PASOK was made feasible by abolishing the merit-based evaluations in selecting civil servants in the public domain, such as utility companies and the National Bank of Greece (see also education). After a decade without merit-based evaluations and intensified PASOK's clientelism, these organizations were near collapse. In 1994, merit-based evaluations were reintroduced by PASOK, known as Supreme Council for Personnel Selection (ASEP). Despite initial criticism of this behavior, Mitsotakis' and future governments adopted Papandreou's newly established voter-patron relation.

Papandreou's populism remained popular in a significant fraction (approximately 40%) of Greek society, despite the deterioration of the economy and the various corruption scandals. Papandreou's son, George Papandreou, capitalized on his father's reputation and was elected leader of PASOK in February 2004 and prime minister during the October 2009 parliamentary elections.

== Footnotes ==
=== Notes ===
1. Papandreou's ministerial experience amounted to just 18 months, serving while his father was prime minister from February 1964 to July 1965. By contrast, Konstantinos Mitsotakis and Costas Simitis each had roughly seven years of ministerial experience before becoming prime ministers. Karamanlis had three years as Minister of Public Works, though as prime minister he was surrounded by more seasoned ministers.
2. In a poll conducted by Kathimerini in 2007, 48% of those polled called Papandreou the "most important Greek prime minister." In the same poll, the first term of Papandreou's government was voted as the best government Greece ever had after Metapolitefsi.

== Sources ==
Books

- Allen, Louis (1990). Political Scandals and Causes Celebres Since 1945. Essex: Longman. ISBN 978-0-582-03065-7.
- Cavallaro, Maria E.; Kornetis, Kostis, eds. (2019). Rethinking Democratisation in Spain, Greece and Portugal. Cham: Palgrave Mcmillan. ISBN 978-3-030-11108-3.
- Carabott, Philip; Sfikas, Thanassis D., eds. (2004). The Greek Civil War: essays on a conflict of exceptionalism and silences. Surrey: Ashgate. ISBN 978-0-7546-4132-2.
- Chilcote, Ronald H.; Hadjiyannis, Stylianos; Lopez, Fred A. III; et al. (2015). Transitions from Dictatorship to Democracy, Comparative Studies of Spain, Portugal, and Greece. New York: Taylor & Francis. ISBN 978-1-317-84104-3.
- —————— (2013). A Concise History of Greece. Cambridge: Cambridge University Press. ISBN 978-1-107-65644-4.
- Close, David H. (2014). Greece since 1945: Politics, Economy and Society. London & New York: Taylor & Francis. ISBN 978-1-317-88001-1.
- ——————; Papadimitriou, Dimitris (2015). Prime Ministers in Greece, The Paradox of Power. Oxford: Oxford University Press. ISBN 978-0-19-871717-1.
- Kaplan, Robert D. (1994). Balkan Ghosts, A Journey Through History. London: Vintage Books. ISBN 0-679-74981-0.
- —————— (2005). Independence from America: global integration and inequality. Burlington: Ashgate. ISBN 978-0-7546-4508-5.
- Koliopoulos, John S.; Veremis, Thanos M. [in Greek] (2009). Modern Greece A History Since 1821. Oxford: Wiley-Blackwell. ISBN 978-1-4443-1483-0.
- Kriesi, Hanspeter; Pappas, Takis S., eds. (2015). European populism in the shadow of the great recession. Colchester: ECPR Press. ISBN 978-1-78552-138-6.
- Lefeber, Louis (1989). "The Socialist Experience in Greece". International Journal of Political Economy. 19 (4): 32–55. doi:10.1080/08911916.1989.11643783. JSTOR 40470531.
- Liakos, Antonis [in Greek]; Doumanis, Nicholas (2023). The Edinburgh History of the Greeks, 20th and Early 21st Centuries: Global Perspectives. Edinburgh: Edinburgh University Press. ISBN 978-1-4744-1084-7.
- —————— (1997). "From traditional clientelism to machine politics: The impact of PASOK populism in Greece". South European Society and Politics. 2 (3): 1–26. doi:10.1080/13608749708539516.
- —————— (2019). Populism and liberal democracy: A comparative and theoretical analysis. Oxford: Oxford University Press. ISBN 978-0-19-257489-3.
- Siani-Davies, Peter (2017). Crisis in Greece. Oxford: Oxford University Press. ISBN 978-0-19-091153-9.

Journals

- Clive, Nigel (1989). "Letter from Greece—mid-December 1988". Government and Opposition. 24 (1): 74–80. doi:10.1111/j.1477-7053.1989.tb00108.x. JSTOR 44482421.
- Loulis, John C. (1984). "Papandreou's Foreign Policy". Foreign Affairs. 63 (2): 375–391. doi:10.2307/20042189. JSTOR 20042189.
- Siani-Davies, Peter; Katsikas, Stefanos (2009). "National reconciliation after civil war: The case of Greece". Journal of Peace Research. 46 (4): 559–575. doi:10.1177/0022343309334611. JSTOR 25654436.

Newspapers and magazines

- Loren Jenkins (21 October 1981). "Papandreou takes over, warns the military". Washington Post.
- Μαυρής, Γιάννης (30 December 2007). "Τομή στη Μεταπολίτευση το 1981". Kathimerini (in Greek).
- "Μεγάλες αλλαγές αλλά και μεγαλύτερες κοινωνικές ανισότητες". Kathimerini (in Greek). 30 December 2007.
- "Σαν σήμερα: Ακούγεται στο Περιστέρι το σύνθημα του Ανδρέα Παπανδρέου "Τσοβόλα δώσ' τα όλα"" (in Greek). Ethnos. 19 April 2021.
- "Σαν σήμερα πριν 35 χρόνια ο Ανδρέας Παπανδρέου αναφωνεί το "Τσοβόλα δώσ' τα όλα"" (in Greek). New Money. 20 April 2024.

Web and other sources

- "Ο Ανδρέας για το "Τσοβώλα δώστα όλα"" (in Greek).
