= Kazakhstan–Slovenia relations =

- Kazakhstan: Slovenia

Diplomatic relations between the Republic of Kazakhstan and the Republic of Slovenia were established on 20 October 1992. Kazakhstan has an embassy in Ljubljana. Slovenia has a non resident ambassador in Moscow.

== History ==
The first President of Kazakhstan, Nursultan Nazarbayev, paid a single official visit to Slovenia from 21 to 23 May 2002. During the visit, he held meetings with the President of Slovenia Milan Kučan, Prime Minister Janez Drnovšek, Speaker of the National Assembly Borut Pahor, and the Mayor of Ljubljana, Vika Potočnik. The talks were conducted both in a restricted and an expanded format and focused in particular on opportunities for the participation of Slovenian pharmaceutical and construction companies in the Kazakhstani market. During the visit, President Kučan awarded Nazarbayev Slovenia’s highest state decoration, the Order of Freedom of the Republic of Slovenia.

During Nazarbayev’s presidency, Presidents of Slovenia visited Kazakhstan on three occasions: Milan Kučan from 22 to 24 September 2002, and Danilo Türk on 10–12 November 2009 and again on 1–2 December 2010.

In 2024, the Embassy of Kazakhstan was opened in Ljubljana, marking an important milestone in the institutional development of bilateral relations.

From 31 March to 1 April 2025, the President of Slovenia, Nataša Pirc Musar, paid an official visit to Kazakhstan.

== See also ==
- Foreign relations of Kazakhstan
- Foreign relations of Slovenia
