= Margulan B. Baimukhan =

Kazakhstan Foreign Ministry official; diplomat

Kazakhstan Ambassador to Belgium
- Incumbent
- Assumed office April 19, 2021
- Appointed by: Kassym-Jomart Tokayev
- Preceded by: Aigul Kuspan

Personal details
- Occupation: Diplomat

Margulan B. Baimukhan is a diplomat of the Republic of Kazakhstan and is the Ambassador to Belgium and to the European Union. Baimukhan presented his credentials to European Commission president Ursula von der Leyen on 12 May 2021. He served as Deputy Foreign Minister of Kazakhstan and as the Ambassador to Poland.

Baimukhan brings a business background to the diplomatic corps having started his career at Daewoo Electronics.
