= SAE – World Council of Hellenes Abroad =

SAE World Council of Hellenes Abroad Σ.Α.Ε. Συμβούλιο Απόδημου Ελληνισμού
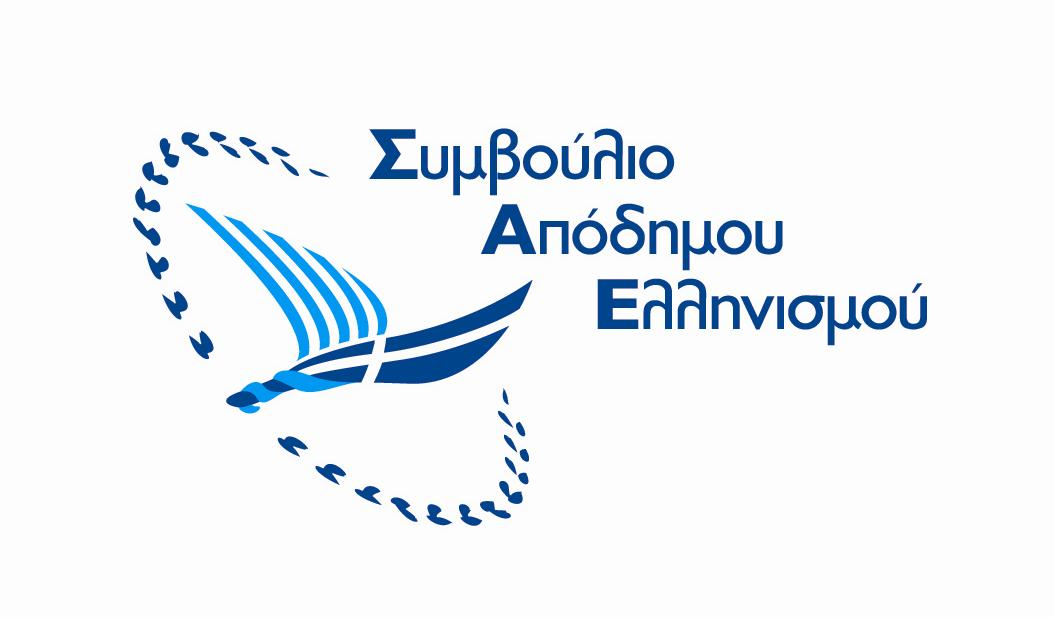
Founded	1995
Type	Organisation of Greek Diaspora
Seat	Thessaloniki, Macedonia
Website	sae.gr

The World Council of Greeks Abroad (SAE; Greek: Συμβούλιο Απόδημου Ελληνισμού, ΣΑΕ) is the main body representing people of Greek ethnic descent, the Greek Diaspora (Omogeneia) living outside the boundaries of the Greek state.

== History ==
SAE was founded in 1995 in Thessaloniki. Its first president was Greek American Andrew Athens. Following the passing of Greek law no. 3480/2006, SAE was given an advisory role to the Greek state on matters relating to the Omogeneia.

In December 2006, Stefanos Tamvakis, an Egyptian Greek, was elected President of the organisation.

== Goals ==
According to SAE its main goal is:

...to bring together the Greeks of the Diaspora creating a global Network aimed at planning and materializing programmes for the benefit of the Omogeneia to be subsequently conveyed to the Greek State thus fulfilling its role as an advisory and consultative body.

== See also ==
- Greek Diaspora
