= Greek diaspora =

Diaspora of the Greek people

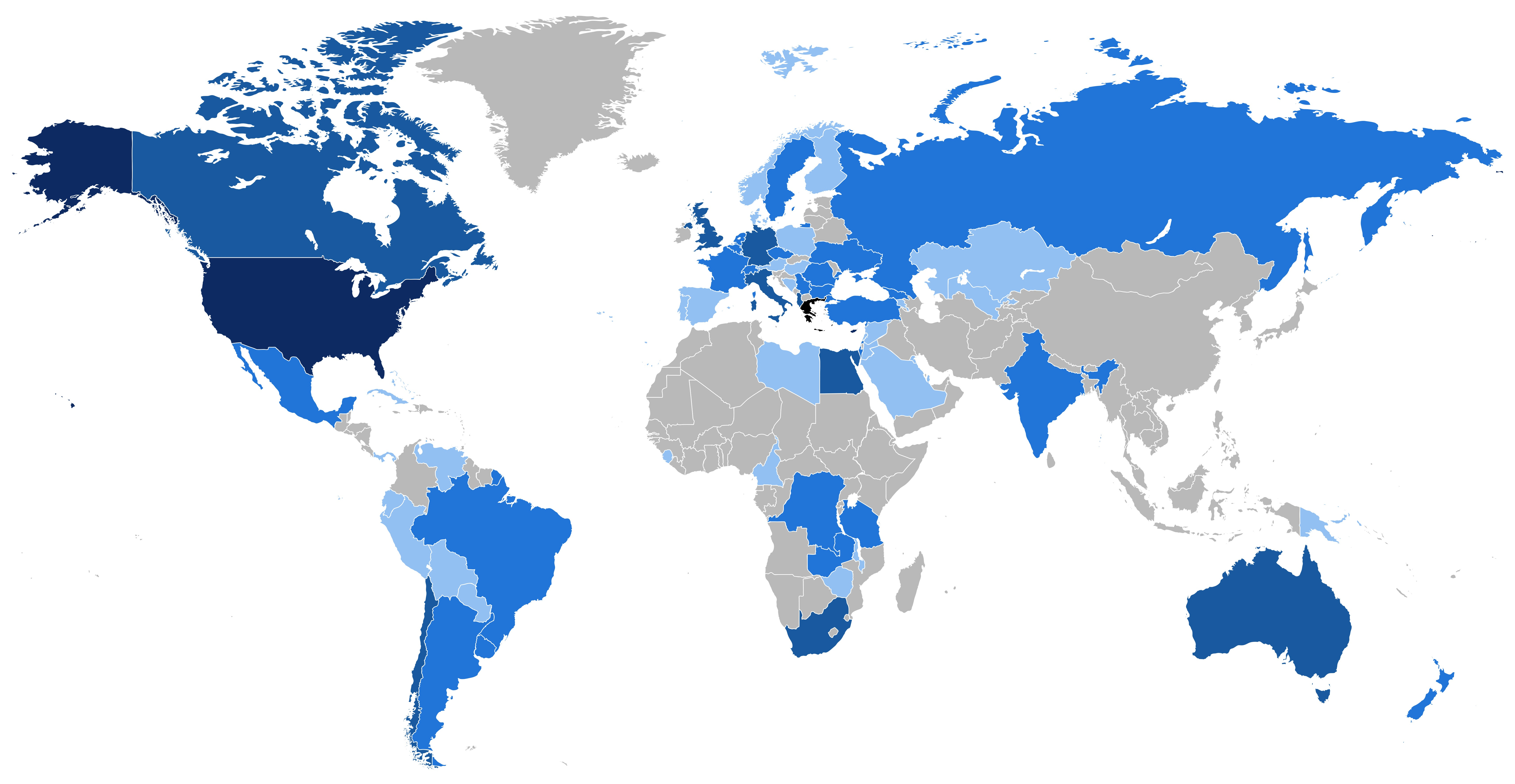
Countries with significant Greek population and descendants Greece + 1,000,000 + 100,000 + 10,000 + 1,000

The Greek diaspora, also known as Omogenia (Greek: Ομογένεια, romanized: Omogéneia), are the communities of Greeks living outside of Greece and Cyprus.

Such places historically (dating to the ancient period) include, Albania, Bulgaria, North Macedonia, southern Russia, Ukraine, Asia Minor and Pontus (in today's Turkey), Georgia, Egypt, Levant, southern Italy (Magna Graecia), Sicily, Cargèse and Marseille in France.

The term also refers to communities established by Greek migration (mostly since the 19th century) outside of the traditional areas; such as in the United States, Australia, Canada, the United Kingdom, Germany, Argentina, Brazil, New Zealand, the United Arab Emirates, Singapore, Norway, and others.

In addition, there were significant Greek communities established during the Cold War period in the USSR, Czechoslovakia, and Poland, following the 1946–1949 Greek Civil War, when Greek Communist refugees and their families were forced to leave Northern Greece and resettle in different parts of the Eastern Bloc.

The Greek diaspora population is estimated at 5 million, which when added to the population of Greece (approximately 10 million), gives a total worldwide Greek population of approximately 15 million.

== Overview ==
The Greek diaspora is one of the oldest diasporas in the world, with an attested presence from Homeric times to the present. Examples of its influence range from the role played by Greek expatriates in the emergence of the Renaissance, through liberation and nationalist movements involved in the fall of the Ottoman Empire, to commercial developments such as the commissioning of the world's first supertankers by shipping magnates Aristotle Onassis and Stavros Niarchos.

== History ==
=== Antiquity ===
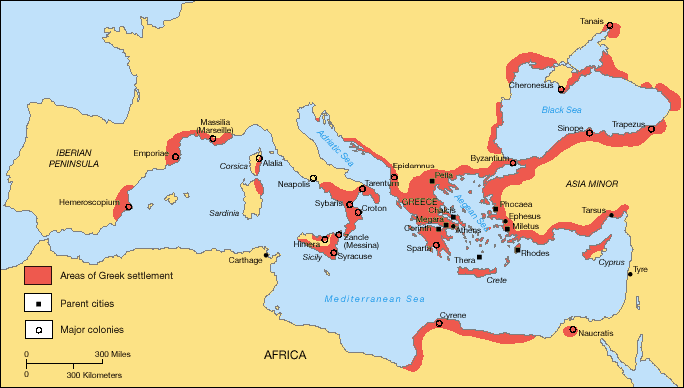
Greek territories and colonies during the Archaic period (800–480 BC)

In Archaic Greece, the trading and colonizing activities of Greeks from the Balkans and Asia Minor propagated Greek culture, religion and language around the Mediterranean and Black Sea basins. Greek city-states were established in Southern Italy (the so-called "Magna Graecia"), northern Libya, eastern Spain, the south of France, and the Black Sea coast, and the Greeks founded over 400 colonies in these areas. Alexander the Great's conquest of the Achaemenid Empire marked the beginning of the Hellenistic period, which was characterized by a new wave of Greek colonization in Asia and Africa; the Greek ruling classes established their presence in Egypt, West Asia, and Northwest India.

Many Greeks migrated to the new Hellenistic cities founded in Alexander's wake, as geographically dispersed as Uzbekistan and Kuwait. Seleucia, Antioch and Alexandria were among the largest cities in the world during Hellenistic and Roman times. Greeks spread across the Roman Empire, and in the eastern territories the Greek language (rather than Latin) became the lingua franca. The Roman Empire was Christianized in the fourth century AD, and during the late Byzantine period the Greek Orthodox form of Christianity became a hallmark of Greek identity.

==== Middle Ages ====
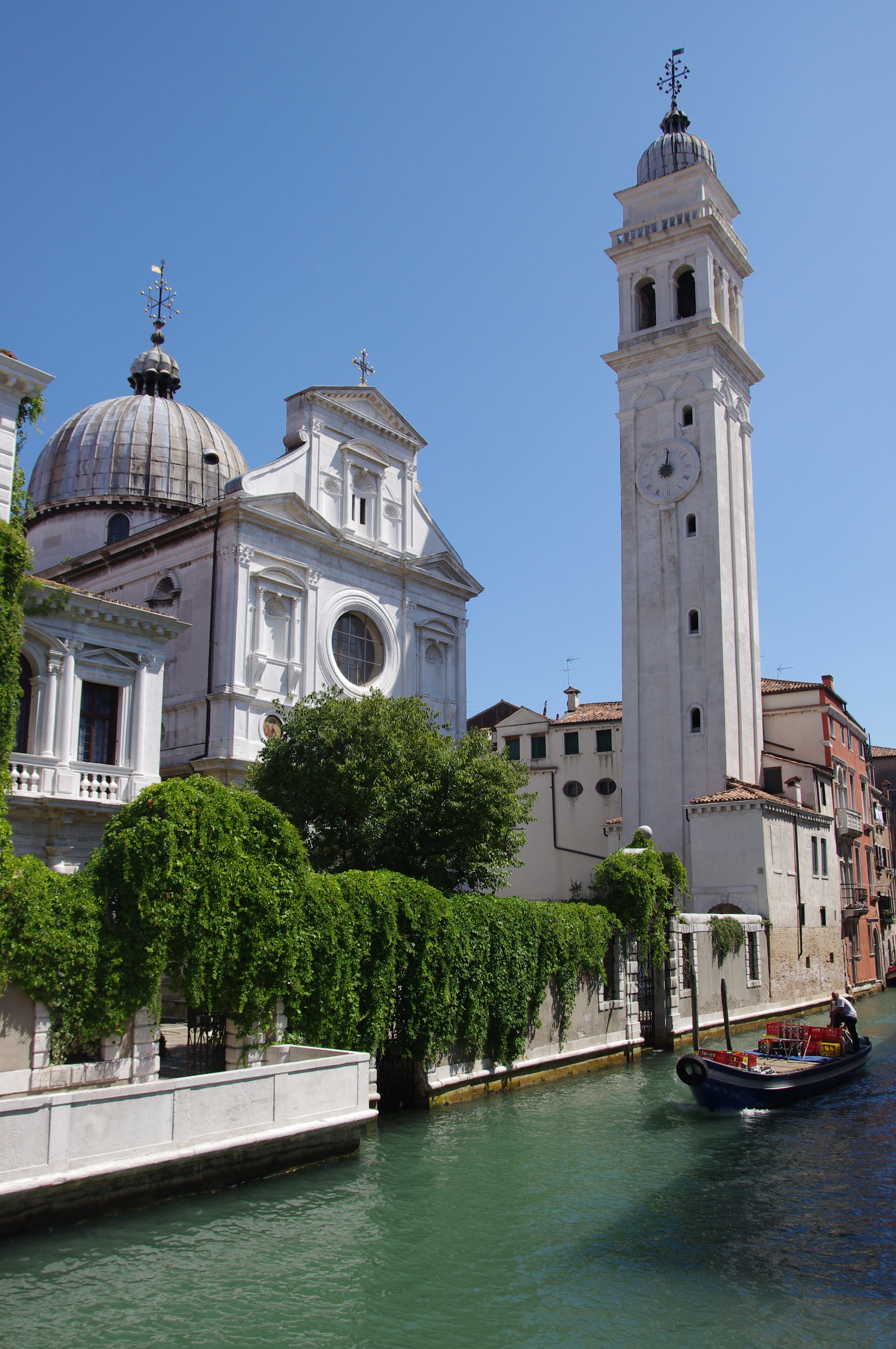
San Giorgio dei Greci, Venice

In the seventh century, Emperor Heraclius adopted Medieval Greek as the official language of the Byzantine Empire. Greeks continued to live around the Levant, Mediterranean and Black Sea, maintaining their identity among local populations as traders, officials, and settlers. Soon afterwards, the Arab-Islamic Caliphate seized the Levant, Egypt, North Africa and Sicily from the Byzantine Greeks during the Byzantine–Arab Wars. The Greek populations generally remained in these areas of the Caliphate and helped translate ancient Greek works into Arabic, thus contributing to early Islamic philosophy and science (which, in turn, contributed to Byzantine science, and later, to Western science).

==== Fall of Byzantium and exodus to Italy ====
After the Byzantine–Ottoman Wars, which resulted in the fall of Constantinople in 1453 and the Ottoman conquest of Greek lands, many Greeks fled Constantinople (now Istanbul) and found refuge in Italy. They brought ancient Greek writings that had been lost in the West, contributing to the Renaissance. Most of these Greeks settled in Venice, Florence, and Rome.

==== Fall of the Empire of Trebizond and exodus to Russia and Georgia ====
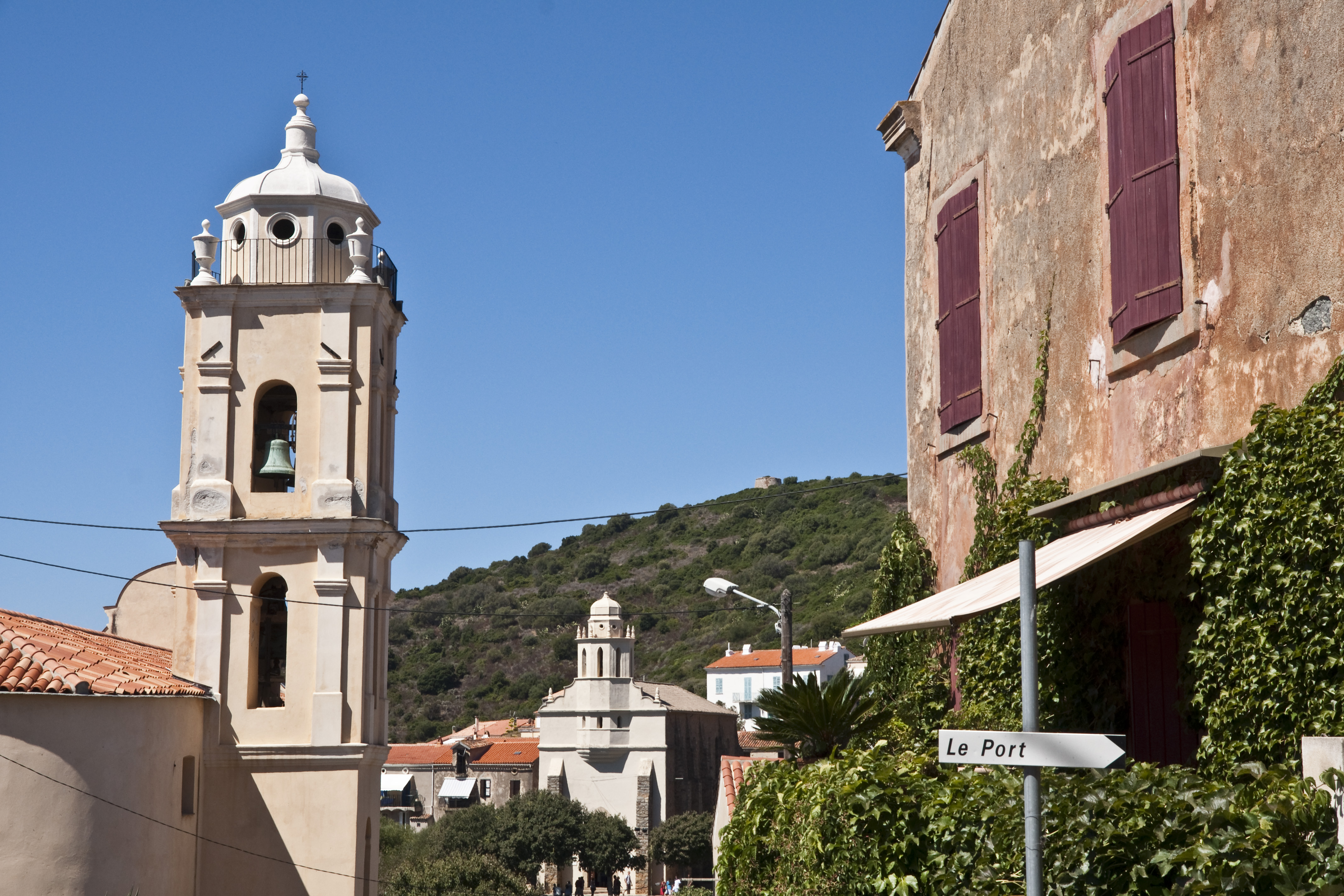
Street in Cargèse (Karyes), Corsica (founded by Maniot refugees), with a Greek church in the background

Between the fall of the Empire of Trebizond to the Ottomans in 1461 and the second Russo-Turkish War in 1828–29, thousands of Pontic Greeks migrated (or fled) from the Pontic Alps and eastern Anatolia to Georgia and other southern regions of the Russian Empire, and (later) to the Russian province of Kars in the South Caucasus. Many Pontic Greeks fled their homelands in Pontus and northeastern Anatolia and settled in these areas to avoid Ottoman reprisals after being suspected of supporting the Russian invasions of eastern Anatolia in the Russo-Turkish Wars from the late 18th to the early 20th century. Others resettled in search of new opportunities in trade, mining, farming, the church, the military, and the bureaucracy of the Russian Empire.

=== Modern era ===
==== Ottoman Empire ====
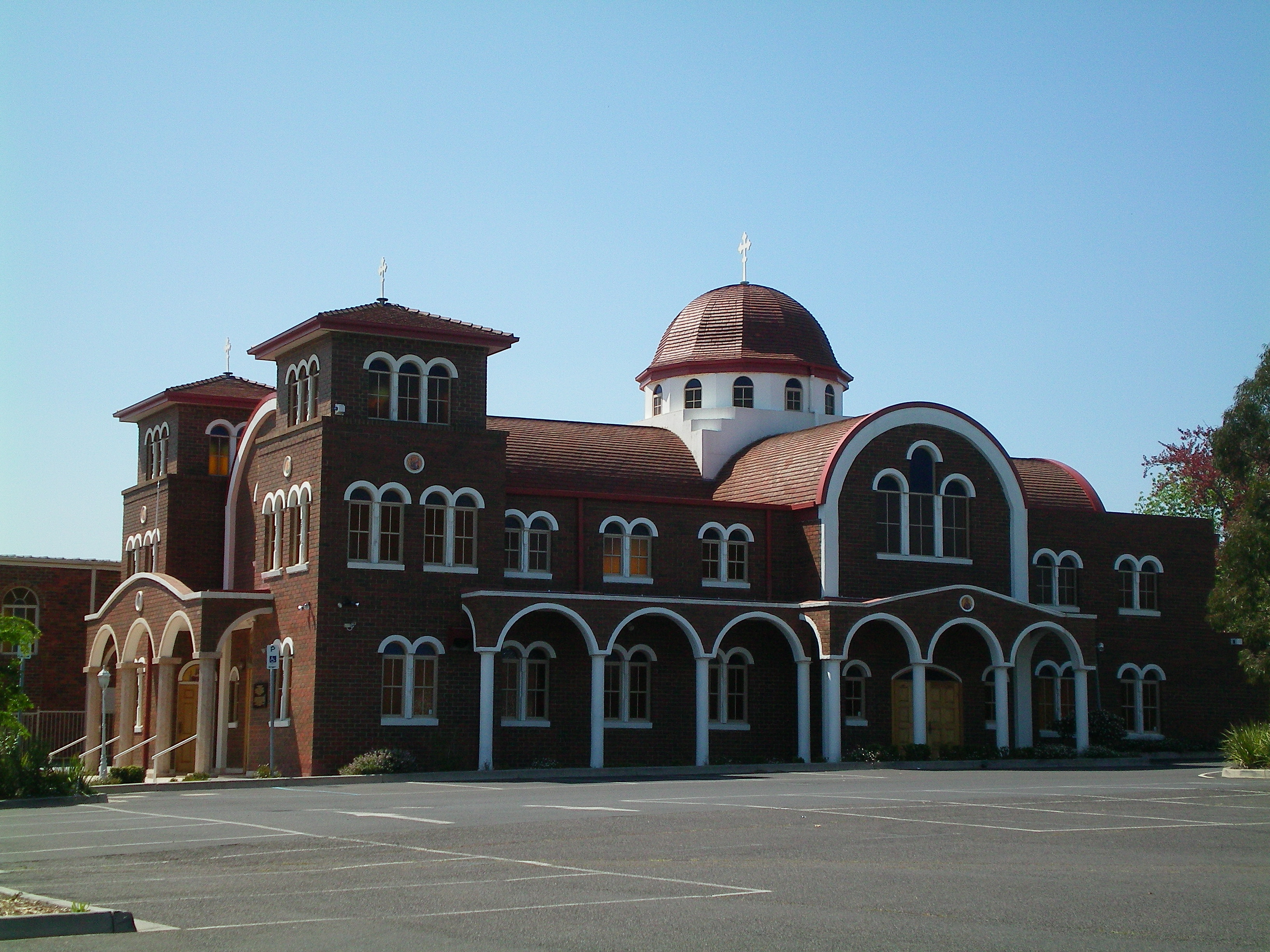
Presentation of Our Lady to the Temple Greek Orthodox Church in Balwyn North, Melbourne

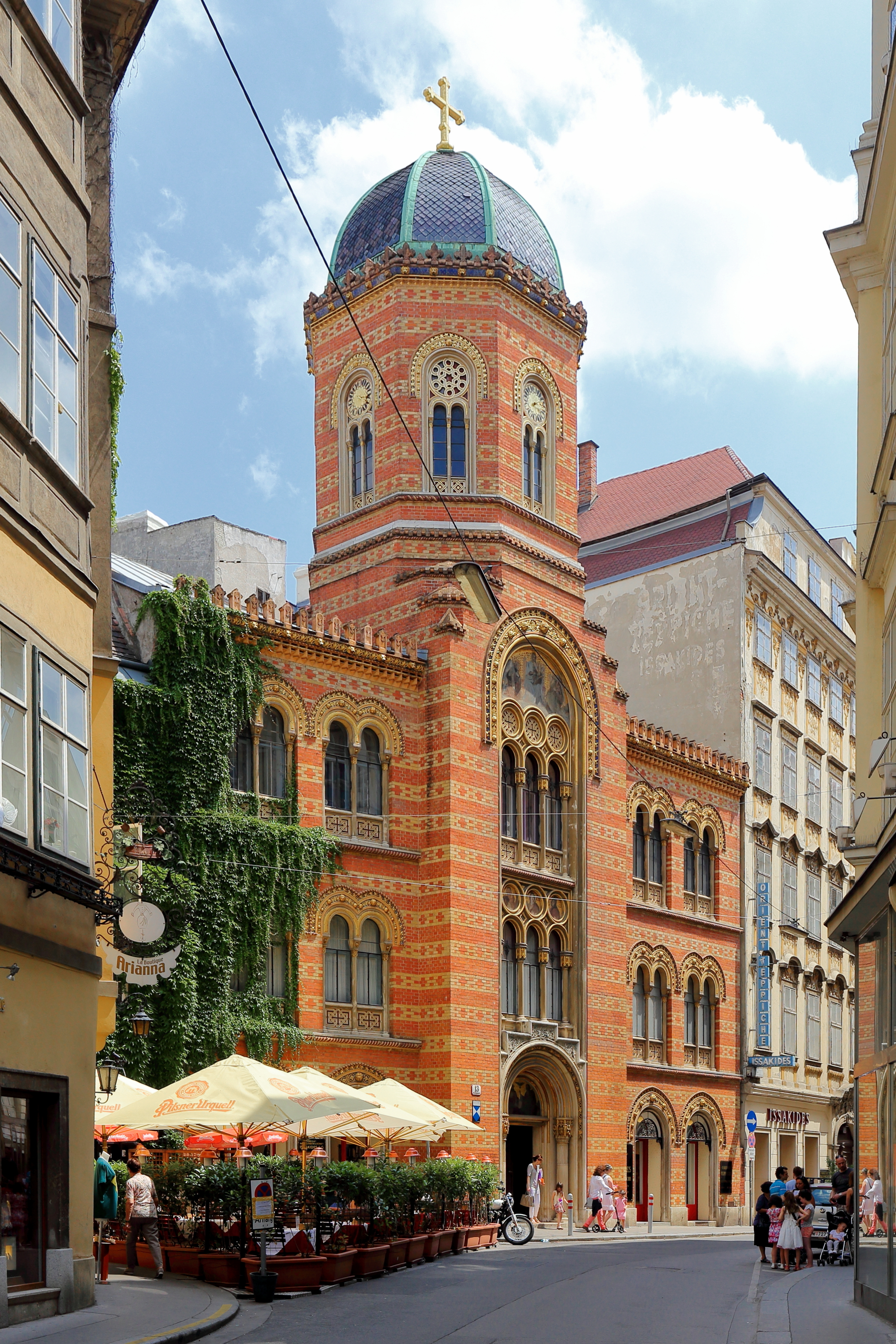
One of Vienna's two Greek Orthodox churches

Greeks spread through many provinces of the Ottoman Empire and took major roles in its economic life, particularly the Phanariots (wealthy Greek merchants who claimed noble Byzantine descent during the second half of the 16th century). The Phanariots helped administer the Ottoman Empire's Balkan domains in the 18th century; some settled in present-day Romania, influencing its political and cultural life. Other Greeks settled outside the southern Balkans, moving north in service to the Orthodox Church or as a result of population transfers and massacres by Ottoman authorities after Greek rebellions against Ottoman rule or suspected Greek collaboration with Russia in the Russo-Turkish wars fought between 1774 and 1878. Greek Macedonia was most affected by the population upheavals, where the large Ottoman Muslim population, residing there since some generations (often including those of Greek-convert descent), could form local militias to harass and exact revenge on the Greek-speaking Christian Orthodox population; this often forced the inhabitants of rural districts, particularly in the more vulnerable lowland areas, to abandon their homes.

A larger-scale movement of Greek-speaking peoples in the Ottoman period was Pontic Greeks from northeastern Anatolia to Georgia and parts of southern Russia, particularly to the province of Kars Oblast in the southern Caucasus after the short-lived Russian occupation of Erzerum and the surrounding region during the 1828–29 Russo-Turkish War. An estimated one-fifth of Pontic Greeks left their homeland in the mountains of northeastern Anatolia in 1829 as refugees, following the Tsarist army as it withdrew back into Russian territory (since many had collaborated with – or fought in – the Russian army against the Muslim Ottomans to regain territory for Christian Orthodoxy). The Pontic Greek refugees who settled in Georgia and the southern Caucasus assimilated with preexisting Caucasus Greek communities. Those who settled in Ukraine and southern Russia became a sizable proportion of cities such as Mariupol, but generally assimilated with Christian Orthodox Russians and continued to serve in the Tsarist army.

In 1788, Ali Pasha of Ioannina destroyed Moscopole. This predominantly ethnic Aromanian settlement historically had an important Greek influence. This is why some members of the Aromanian diaspora that settled in places such as Vienna in Austria have been considered as Greeks and part of a Greek diaspora as well.

==== 19th century ====
During and after the Greek War of Independence, Greeks of the diaspora established the fledgling state, raised funds and awareness abroad and served as senior officers in Russian armies which fought the Ottomans to help liberate Greeks under Ottoman subjugation in Macedonia, Epirus, and Thrace. Greek merchant families had contacts in other countries; during the disturbances, many set up home bases around the Mediterranean (notably Marseille in France, Livorno, Calabria and Bari in Italy and Alexandria in Egypt), Russia (Odesa and Saint Petersburg), and Britain (London and Liverpool) from where they traded (typically textiles and grain). Businesses frequently included the extended family, and they brought schools teaching Greek and the Greek Orthodox Church. As markets changed, some families became shippers (financed through the local Greek community, with the aid of the Ralli or Vagliano Brothers). The diaspora expanded across the Levant, North Africa, India and the United States. Many leaders of the Greek struggle for liberation from Ottoman Macedonia and other parts of the southern Balkans with large Greek populations still under Ottoman rule had links to the Greek trading and business families who funded the Greek liberation struggle against the Ottomans and the creation of a Greater Greece.

The terrible devastation of the island of Chios in the 1822 massacre caused a great dispersion of the islanders, leading to the creation of a specific Chian diaspora.

After the Treaty of Constantinople, the political situation stabilised; some displaced families returned to the newly independent country to become key figures in cultural, educational and political life, especially in Athens. Financial assistance from overseas was channeled through these family ties, providing for institutions such as the National Library and sending relief after natural disasters.

==== 20th century ====
During the 20th century, many Greeks left the traditional homelands for economic and political reasons; this resulted in large migrations from Greece and Cyprus to the United States, Australia, Canada, Brazil, the United Kingdom, New Zealand, Argentina, the United Arab Emirates, Singapore, Germany, Norway, Belgium, Georgia, Italy, Armenia, Russia, Chile, Mexico, South Africa, and other countries, especially after World War I (1914–1918), World War II (1939–1945), the Greek Civil War (1946–1949) and the Turkish Invasion of Cyprus in 1974.

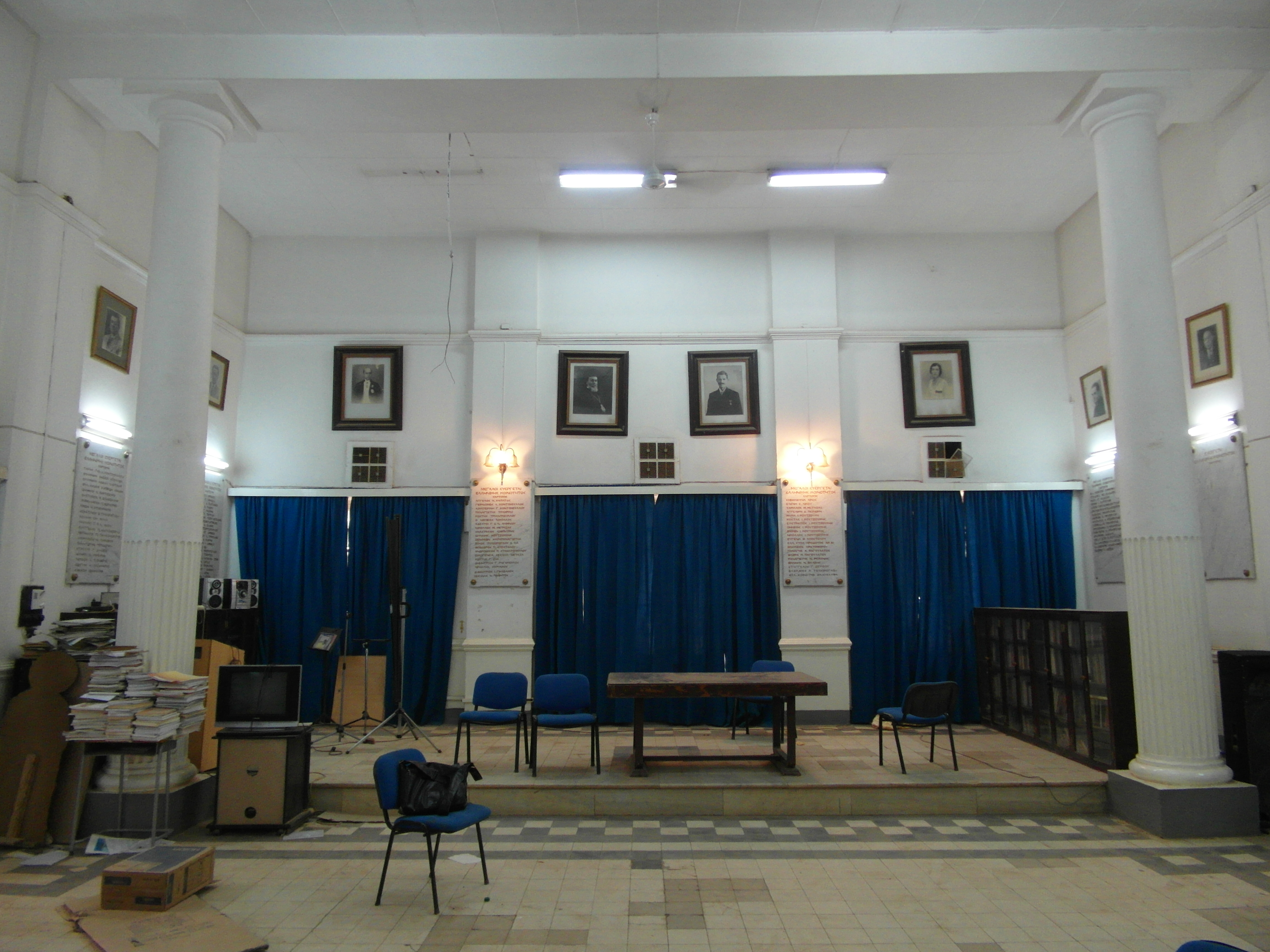
Main hall of the Greek community centre in Khartoum, Sudan (2015)

After World War I, most Pontian and Anatolian Greeks living in Asia Minor (modern-day Turkey) were victims of Muslim Turkish intolerance for Christians in the Ottoman Empire. More than 3.5 million Greeks, Armenians, and Assyrians were killed in the regimes of the Young Turks and Mustafa Kemal, from 1914 to 1923. Greeks in Asia Minor fled to modern Greece, and the Russian Empire (later the Soviet Union) was also a major destination.

Mass population transfers in the Soviet Union led to the displacement of thousands of Pontic Greeks and Greek communists in the 1940s, creating a sizable Greek diaspora in Central Asia. Following the persecution and mass killing of the Greek Operation starting in the late 1930s, mass deportations of Soviet Greeks took place throughout the 1940s, forcing over 30,000 Greeks of Crimea and the larger Black Sea region into Central Asia, especially to Kazakhstan and Uzbekistan. After the defeat of the Democratic Army of Greece and the Communist Party of Greece in 1949, another wave of Greeks entered Central Asia, as the Soviet Union sent around 11,000 refugees of the Greek Civil War to Tashkent. In the early 1980s, with the decriminalisation of the Greek Communist Party, many returned to Greece. However, there is still a Greek community in Uzbekistan which survives to this day.

After the Greek Civil War, many communist Greeks and their families fled to neighboring Yugoslavia, the Soviet Union and the Soviet-dominated states of Eastern Europe (especially Czechoslovakia). Hungary founded a village (Beloiannisz) for Greek refugees, and many Greeks were resettled in the former Sudetenland region of northeastern Czechoslovakia around Krnov. Sweden also admitted large numbers of Greeks, and over 17,000 Greek-Swedish descendants live in the country.

Although many immigrants later returned to Greece, these countries still have a number of first- and second-generation Greeks who maintain their traditions.

With the fall of Communism in eastern Europe and the Soviet Union, Greeks of the diaspora immigrated to modern Greece's main urban centers of Athens, Thessaloniki, and Cyprus; many came from Georgia.

Pontic Greeks are Greek-speaking communities originating in the Black Sea region, particularly from the Trebizond region, the Pontic Alps, eastern Anatolia, Georgia, and the former Russian south-Caucasus Kars Oblast. After 1919–1923, most of these Pontic Greek and Caucasus Greek communities resettled in Greek Macedonia or joined other Greek communities in southern Russia and Ukraine.

== Greek nationality ==
Anyone who is ethnically Greek and born outside Greece may become a Greek citizen through naturalization if they can prove that a parent or grandparent was a Greek national. The Greek ancestor's birth and marriage certificates and the applicant's birth certificate are required, along with birth certificates for all intervening generations between the applicant and the person with Greek citizenship.

Greek citizenship is acquired by birth by all persons born in Greece who do not acquire a foreign citizenship and all persons born to at least one parent who is a registered Greek citizen. People born out of wedlock to a father who is a Greek citizen and a mother who is a non-Greek automatically gain Greek citizenship if the father recognizes them as his child before they turn 18.

== Present day ==
Centers of the Greek diaspora include New York City, Boston, Chicago, Los Angeles, Munich, London, Melbourne, Sydney, Adelaide, Montreal, Toronto, and Johannesburg.

The SAE – World Council of Hellenes Abroad has compiled several studies on the Greek diaspora. The total number of Greeks living outside Greece and Cyprus is uncertain. Available census figures indicate about three million Greeks outside Greece and Cyprus, but the SAE estimates about seven million worldwide. The Greek diaspora defends Greek interests, particularly in the US. Assimilation and loss of the Greek language influence the definition of the Greek diaspora. To learn more about how factors such as intermarriage and assimilation influence self-identification among young Greeks in the diaspora, and to help clarify the estimates of Greeks in the diaspora, the Next Generation Initiative began an academically supervised research study in 2008.

=== United States ===
The United States has the largest ethnically-Greek population outside Greece. According to the US Department of State, the Greek-American community numbers about three million and the vast majority are third- or fourth-generation immigrants. According to the World Council of Churches, the Ecumenical Patriarchate has a membership of 600,000 in the US and Canada who are still Greek Orthodox; however, many Greeks in both countries have adopted other religions or become secular. The 2010 census recorded about 130,000 Greek Americans, although members of the community dispute its accuracy.

=== Canada ===
Most Greek Canadians live in Toronto, Montreal and Vancouver. The 2016 census reported that 271,405 Canadians were Greek by ancestry and 16,715 people were born in Greece.

=== Chile ===
Greek immigration to Chile began during the 16th century from the island of Crete. Cretan Greeks settled in the Antofagasta Region in the mid-16th century and spread to other locations, such as the Greek colony in Santiago and the cities of San Diego, Valparaíso, Talcahuano, Puerto Montt, and Punta Arenas.

=== Australia ===
Australia has one of the world's largest Greek communities. Greek immigration to Australia began during the 19th century, increasing significantly in the 1950s and 1960s. According to the 2016 census, there were 397,431 Greeks and Greek Cypriots (by ancestry) living in Australia and 93,740 Greeks born in Greece or Cyprus. According to Greeks around the Globe, Greek Australians number about 700,000. The majority of Greeks in Australia (over 90 percent) are Greek Orthodox and many attend church weekly. According to the SBS, Greeks in Australia have a higher level of church attendance than Greeks in Greece. There are minorities of Catholics, Jehovah's Witnesses and Pentecostals. Currently, there are 152 Greek Orthodox churches in Australia, most under jurisdiction of the Greek Orthodox Archdiocese of Australia. In addition, there are 8 monasteries as well as schools, theological colleges and aged care centres.

=== Brazil ===
About 50,000 Greeks immigrated to Brazil from Greece and Cyprus, with 20,000 in the city of São Paulo. Brazil has a sizable community of Antiochean Greeks (known as Melkites), Orthodox, Catholics, and Jews. According to the Catholic Church, the Eparchy of Nossa Senhora do Paraíso em São Paulo (Melkite Greek), the Eparchia Dominae Nostrae Paradisis S. Pauli Graecorum Melkitarum had a 2016 membership of 46,600. The World Council of Churches estimates that the Greek Orthodox Patriarchate of Antioch has a membership of 90,000 in Latin America, the majority of whom live in Brazil.

=== Israel ===
About 250 Non-Jewish Greeks immigrated to Ottoman Palestine and Mandatory Palestine for the service of the Greek-Orthodox church in the country between 1850 and 1920, mostly residing in Jerusalem and Nazareth City. There are about 1,500–2,500 ethnic Greeks today; few were able to obtain Greek citizenship, largely due to the refusal of recognition from Greece.

=== Mexico ===
Greeks started to immigrate to Mexico in the late 1800s from the mainland, and especially Greece's islands and Cyprus. While there was an individual immigration to Mexico, the Mexican government looked to start olive production in the Pacific Coast, so thousands were taken to the state of Sinaloa where the Greeks found fortunes in the tomato production instead. Today there are tens of thousands of Greek-Mexicans living primarily in Culiacán, Veracruz, and Mexico City as well as surrounding areas and other cities.

== Demographics ==
List of countries and territories by Greek population
Country/territory	Official Data Ancestry	Official Data Greek Nationality	Official Data Born in Greece	Estimates	Article
United States	1,243,592 (ACS-5Y 2021, Greek ancestry)	—N/a	121,928 (ACS-5Y 2021, born in Greece)	3,000,000; 9,785 (ACS-5Y 2021, Cypriot ancestry)	Greek Americans
Cyprus	721,000 (2011 census, Cypriot and Greek citizens)			1,150,000; 322 Ethnic Greeks in the self-declared Turkish Republic of Northern Cyprus (2006 census)	Greek Cypriots
Germany	449,000 (2021, Greek Migration Background)	362,565 (2021, Greek Nationality)	289,225 (2021, Foreign-born, Greece)	320,000, 370,000; 348,475 (2016, Greek Nationality), 274,060 (2016, born in Greece), 74,415 (2016, born in Germany)	Greeks in Germany
Australia	424,750 (2021 census, Greek ancestry)	—N/a	92,314 (2021 census, born in Greece); 16,737 (2021 census, born in Cyprus)	700,000	Greek Australians
Canada	262,135 (2021 census, Greek ancestry)	—N/a	58,410 (2021 census, born in Greece); 4,335 (2021 census, born in Cyprus)	720,000	Greek Canadians
United Kingdom	43,875 (2011 Census, Greek ethnic origin)	62,000 (2021, Greek Nationality); 14,000 (2021, Cyprus Nationality),	77,000 (2021, Foreign-born, Greece); 59,000 (2021, Foreign-born, Cyprus)	300,000-400,000; 25,891 (2011 Census, Greek Cypriot ethnic origin); 15,296 (2011 Census, Cypriot (part not stated) ethnic origin)	Greek Britons
Albania	40,000 Greek citizenship holders (2011 census)			Sources vary. Between 200,000 and 300,000 ethnic Greeks in Albania. In addition, a large number also reside in Greece, Australia and the United States.	Greeks in Albania
Ukraine	91,548 (2001 census)				Greeks in Ukraine
Netherlands	37,382 (2023, Greek Migration Background)	25,138 (2022, Greek Nationality)	23,465 (2022, Greek Foreign-born, Greece)	4,000, 12,500	Greeks in the Netherlands
Russia	35,640 (2010 census)				Greeks in Russia and Caucasus Greeks
South Africa			10,878 (2020, Greece, Migrant Stock), 3,034 (1995, Greece, Migrant Stock); 4,069 (1996, Foreign-born, Greece)	120,000 (estimate) 50,000-60,000 (estimate) 120,000 (estimate, 1970) 70,000 (estimate, 1990) 40,000 (estimate, 2012) 35,000 (estimate, 2022)	Greeks in South Africa
Sweden	35,193 (2021, Greek Origin)	11,049 (2021, Greek Nationality)	19,931 (2018, Foreign-born, Greece)		Greeks in Sweden
Belgium	24,836 (2014, Greek foreign origin and descendants)	17,513 (2018, Greek Nationality)	17,350 (2018, Foreign-born, Greece)	16,275 (2015, Foreign national, Greece) Belgium, Foreign national	Greeks in Belgium
Switzerland		17,695 (2021, Greek Nationality)	16,984 (2021, Foreign-born, Greece)	8,340, 11,000	
France		7,800 (2016, Greek Nationality)	11,100 (2016, Foreign-born, Greece)	35,000 – 80,000 35,747 (2005, Greek citizens)	Greeks in France
Italy		7,243 (2021, Greek Nationality)		7,572 (2018, Greek citizens); 20,000, 30,000	Greeks in Italy
Austria		6,864 (2019, Greek Nationality)	6,766 (2019, Foreign-born, Greece)	5,000	Greeks in Austria
Spain		5,369 (2022, Greek Nationality)	4,422 (2022, Foreign-born, Greece)	300, 1,500–2,000	
Denmark	4,147 (2022, Greek Ancestry)	3,622 (2022, Greek Nationality)	4,241 (2022, Foreign-born, Greece)		Greeks in Denmark
Norway	5,337 (2020, Greek Ancestry)	4,027 (2022, Greek Nationality)	3,599 (2020, Foreign-born, Greece)		
Portugal		794 (2021, foreign citizens with Greek Nationality, thus not counting, for instance, 30 Luso-Greeks who have acquired the Portuguese nationality after 2008)			
Luxembourg		4,017 (2022, Greek Nationality)		1,571 (2009)	
Brazil	—N/a	—N/a	—N/a	5,000 – 3,000 50,000 in São Paulo	Greeks in Brazil
Argentina	2,196 (2001, born in Greece)			5,000, 50,000	Greeks in Argentina
Chile	8,500 (2012 census)			100,000	Greeks in Chile
Mexico	—N/a	—N/a	—N/a	25,000	Greek Mexicans
Venezuela	—N/a	—N/a	—N/a	6,000, 3,000 (Greek-born population)	Greeks in Venezuela
Romania	6,513 (2002 census)			15,000	Greeks in Romania
Georgia	15,166 (2002 census)			15,166	Greeks in Georgia and Caucasus Greeks
Kazakhstan	4,703 (1999 census)			9,000	Greeks in Kazakhstan
Armenia	900 (2011 census)			6,000	Greeks in Armenia and Caucasus Greeks
Uzbekistan	5,453 (1989 census)			4,500	Greeks in Uzbekistan
Egypt	—N/a	—N/a	—N/a	3,000, 5,000	Greeks in Egypt
Qatar	—N/a	—N/a	—N/a	3.000	
Hungary	3,916 (2011 census)			4,000 – 10,000	Greeks in Hungary
Poland	3,600 (2011 census)				Greeks in Poland
Bulgaria	3,408 (2001 census)			8,500	Greeks in Bulgaria
Czech Republic	3,231 (2001 census)			3,000	Greeks in the Czech Republic
Moldova	—N/a	—N/a	—N/a	3,000	Greeks in Moldova
Turkey	—N/a	—N/a	—N/a	2,500-3,500	Greeks in Turkey, Pontic Greeks, Cappadocian Greeks and Caucasus Greeks
Ecuador	—N/a	—N/a	—N/a	3,000	
New Zealand	2,589 (2013 census, people who declared Greek ancestry)	—N/a	999 (2013, Foreign-born, Greece)	4,500, 5,000	Greeks in New Zealand
Lebanon	—N/a	—N/a	—N/a	1,500-2,500	Greeks in Lebanon
Oman	—N/a	—N/a	—N/a	1,500	
Saudi Arabia	—N/a	—N/a	—N/a	1,300	
Cameroon	—N/a	—N/a	—N/a	1,200	
Zimbabwe	—N/a	—N/a	—N/a	1,100	Greeks in Zimbabwe
Uruguay	—N/a	—N/a	—N/a	1,000, 2,000	Greeks in Uruguay
Syria	—N/a	—N/a	—N/a	8,000	Greeks in Syria
Israel	—N/a	—N/a	—N/a	1,000-6,000 Greek Jews (Sephardic and Romaniote); 1,500-2,500 (non-Jewish Greeks)	Greeks in Israel
Panama	—N/a	—N/a	—N/a	800, 1,000	
Finland	1,681			500	Greeks in Finland
Serbia	725 (2011 census)			5,000	Greeks in Serbia
Republic of North Macedonia	422 (2002 census)				Greeks in North Macedonia
Turkmenistan	359 (1995 census)				
Latvia	289 (2011 census)			100	
Lithuania	159 (2011 census)	—N/a	—N/a	250	
Estonia	150 (2001 census)				
Slovenia	54 (2002 census)				
Zambia	—N/a	—N/a	—N/a	800	
Kyrgyzstan	—N/a	—N/a	—N/a	650–700	Greeks in Kyrgyzstan
Malta	—N/a	—N/a	—N/a	500	Greeks in Malta
Ethiopia	—N/a	—N/a	—N/a	500	Greeks in Ethiopia
Jordan	—N/a	—N/a	—N/a	400, 600	
South Korea	—N/a	451	—N/a	Around 450	Greeks in Korea
Democratic Republic of the Congo	—N/a	—N/a	—N/a	300	Greeks in the Democratic Republic of the Congo
The Bahamas	—N/a	—N/a	—N/a	300	
Nigeria	—N/a	—N/a	—N/a	300	
Tanzania	—N/a	—N/a	—N/a	300	
Barbados	—N/a	—N/a	—N/a	300	
The Gambia	—N/a	—N/a	—N/a	300	
Costa Rica	—N/a	—N/a	—N/a	80, 290	
Sudan	—N/a	—N/a	—N/a	250	Greeks in Sudan
Azerbaijan	—N/a	—N/a	—N/a	250–300	Greeks in Azerbaijan
Malawi	—N/a	—N/a	—N/a	200	
Colombia	—N/a	—N/a	—N/a	200	
Ireland	—N/a	—N/a	—N/a	200	
Kenya	—N/a	—N/a	—N/a	200	
United Arab Emirates	—N/a	—N/a	—N/a	200	Greeks in the United Arab Emirates
Morocco	—N/a	—N/a	—N/a	180	
Peru	—N/a	—N/a	—N/a	150, 350	
Botswana	—N/a	—N/a	—N/a	150	
Djibouti	—N/a	—N/a	—N/a	150	
Hong Kong	—N/a	—N/a	—N/a	150	
Kuwait	—N/a	—N/a	—N/a	140	
Slovakia	—N/a	—N/a	—N/a	100	
Japan	—N/a	—N/a	—N/a	100, 300	
Bolivia	—N/a	—N/a	—N/a	100	
China	—N/a	278 (2020, Greek Nationality)	—N/a	100	
Philippines	—N/a	—N/a	—N/a	100	Greeks in the Philippines
South Sudan	—N/a	—N/a	—N/a	90	Greeks in South Sudan
Indonesia	—N/a	—N/a	—N/a	72	
Papua New Guinea	—N/a	—N/a	—N/a	70	
Iran	—N/a	—N/a	—N/a	60, 80	
Ivory Coast	—N/a	—N/a	—N/a	60	
Madagascar	—N/a	—N/a	—N/a	60	
Croatia	—N/a	—N/a	—N/a	50	
Tunisia	—N/a	—N/a	—N/a	50	
Senegal	—N/a	—N/a	—N/a	50	
Thailand	—N/a	—N/a	—N/a	50	
Central African Republic	—N/a	—N/a	—N/a	40	
Singapore	—N/a	—N/a	—N/a	40	
Cuba	—N/a	—N/a	—N/a	30	
Algeria	—N/a	—N/a	—N/a	30	
Eritrea	—N/a	—N/a	—N/a	30	
Paraguay	—N/a	—N/a	—N/a	20, 25	
Chad	—N/a	—N/a	—N/a	20	
Guatemala	—N/a	—N/a	—N/a	20	
Mozambique	—N/a	—N/a	—N/a	20	
Namibia	—N/a	—N/a	—N/a	20	
Togo	—N/a	—N/a	—N/a	20	
Taiwan	—N/a	—N/a	—N/a	20	
Uganda	—N/a	—N/a	—N/a	15	
Dominican Republic	—N/a	—N/a	—N/a	14	
Republic of the Congo	—N/a	—N/a	—N/a	10	
Vietnam	—N/a	—N/a	—N/a	10	

== Notable Greeks of the diaspora ==
Notable people of the Greek diaspora (including those of Greek ancestry):

- Spiro Agnew
- Achilles Alferaki
- Sofia Adamson
- Nikos Aliagas
- Leo Allatius
- Braith Anasta
- Constantine Andreou
- The Andrews Sisters
- Harry Agganis
- Criss Angel
- Steve Angello
- Jennifer Aniston
- John Aniston
- E. M. Antoniadi
- George Averoff
- Kostas Axelos
- Marco Basaiti
- Dave Bautista
- Antonis Benakis
- Emmanouil Benakis
- George Bizos
- Charles Denis Bourbaki
- Nick Calathes
- Maria Callas
- Michel-Dimitri Calvocoressi
- Toma Caragiu
- Ion Luca Caragiale
- Constantin Carathéodory
- John Cassavetes
- Cornelius Castoriadis
- Constantine Cavafy
- Kim Cesarion
- Jorgo Chatzimarkakis
- Chris Chelios
- André Chénier
- Joseph Chénier
- Kelly Clarkson
- Mad Clip
- Constantine II of Greece
- Michael Constantine
- George Coulouris
- Georges Corraface
- George P. Cosmatos
- Jamie Dimon
- Jacques Damala
- Mickey Dee
- Michael Dertouzos
- Michael Dukakis
- Nikolaus Dumba
- Katerine Duska
- Chris Diamantopoulos
- Olympia Dukakis
- Tina Fey
- Patricia Field
- Thomas Flanginis
- Christos Floros
- Mario Frangoulis
- Juan de Fuca
- Christos Gage
- Nicholas Gage
- Zach Galifianakis
- Nick Galis
- Costa-Gavras
- Elias Gyftopoulos
- George of Trebizond
- Nick Giannopoulos
- Alexi Giannoulias
- El Greco
- Nick Gravenites
- Bret Hart
- Stavros Halkias
- Lafcadio Hearn
- José Holebas
- Arianna Huffington
- John Iliopoulos
- Isidore of Kiev
- Sir Alec Issigonis
- Hugh Jackman
- Theodor Kallifatides
- Andreas Kalvos
- George Kambosos Jr
- Melina Kanakaredes
- Tina Kandelaki
- Ioannis Kapodistrias
- Alex Kapranos
- Herbert von Karajan
- Andreas Katsulas
- Elia Kazan
- Frank Klopas
- Vladimir Kokkinaki
- Thanasi Kokkinakis
- Lampros Kontogiannis
- Adamantios Korais
- Elias Koteas
- Jannis Kounellis
- Nick Kyrgios
- Jim Londos
- Alexi Lalas
- Vicky Leandros
- Tommy Lee
- Francisco Leontaritis
- Marina Diamandis
- Demetri Martin
- Maximus the Greek
- Maria Menounos
- Enrique Metinides
- George Michael
- Bartolomé Mitre
- Jean Moréas
- Nana Mouskouri
- Marcus Musurus
- Nicholas Negroponte
- John Negroponte
- Johnny Otis
- Alexandros Pallis
- Georgios Papanikolaou
- Stass Paraskos
- Alexander Payne
- George Peponis
- Mark Philippoussis
- Joseph Pilates
- Leontius Pilatus
- Basil Poledouris
- Nicos Poulantzas
- Ange Postecoglou
- Alex Proyas
- Théodore Ralli
- Angelique Rockas
- Michel Emmanuel Rodocanachi
- Athina Onassis Roussel
- Demis Roussos
- Pete Sampras
- Viktor Sarianidi
- Telly Savalas
- Joseph Sifakis
- Marina Sirtis
- Nikolaos Skoufas
- Spyros Skouras
- Olympia Snowe
- Queen Sophia of Spain
- Stefania Liberakakis
- Jose Manuel Estela Stilianopoulos
- Dimitri Soudas
- John Stamos
- Theodoros Stamos
- Dino Stamatopoulos
- George Stephanopoulos
- Cat Stevens
- Demetrio Stratos
- Trish Stratus
- Patrick Tatopoulos
- Amanda Georgiadi Tenfjord
- Theophanes the Greek
- Jake Tsakalidis
- Athanasios Tsakalov
- Paul Tsongas
- Emmanuel Tzanes
- Panayis Athanase Vagliano
- Vangelis
- Obdulio Varela
- Nia Vardalos
- Ioannis Varvakis
- John Varvatos
- Laert Vasili
- Antonio Vassilacchi
- Gregory Vlastos
- Emmanuil Xanthos
- Iannis Xenakis
- Yanni
- Milo Yiannopoulos
- Fyodor Yurchikhin
- Betty White
- Rita Wilson
- Billy Zane
- Frank Zappa
- Evangelos Zappas
- Konstantinos Zappas
- Christian Zervos
- Giorgio Tsoukalos
- Demetrio B. Lakas
- Elli AvrRam

== See also ==
- Antiochian Greeks
- Cappadocian Greek
- Church of Greece
- Cypriot Orthodox Church
- Ecumenical Patriarch of Constantinople
- Ecumenical Patriarchate of Constantinople
- Grecheskaya Operatsiya
- Greek Byzantine Catholic Church
- Greek Orthodox Church of Alexandria
- Greek Orthodox Church of Antioch
- Greek Orthodox Church of Jerusalem
- Greek Cypriot diaspora
- Greek-Calabrian dialect
- Swedish Greeks
- Griko language
- Griko people
- Hellenistic civilization
- List of Greek Americans
- Orthodox Church in America
- Enclaved Greek Cypriots
- Cretan Muslims
