= Croatia–Kazakhstan relations =

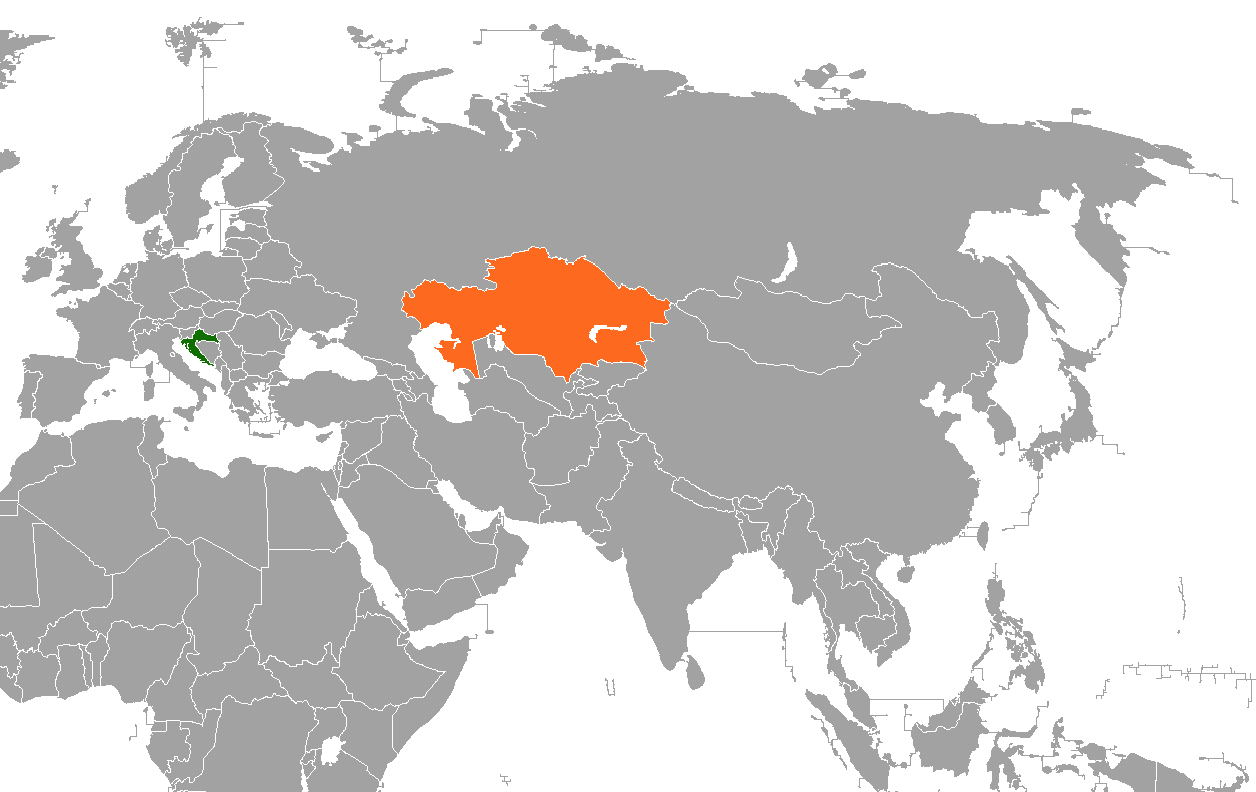

- Croatia: Kazakhstan

Diplomatic relations between Kazakhstan and Croatia were established on 20 October 1992.

== History ==
In July 2001, the President of Kazakhstan, Nursultan Nazarbayev, paid an official visit to Croatia. During the visit, he met with the President of Croatia Stjepan Mesić, Prime Minister Ivica Račan, members of the Croatian Parliament, and representatives of the business community at the Croatian Chamber of Economy. The presidents signed the Declaration on the Foundations of Relations between the Republic of Kazakhstan and the Republic of Croatia. During the visit, Nazarbayev was awarded Croatia’s highest state decoration, the Order of King Tomislav. An informal (“no-tie”) meeting was also held between the presidents of Croatia, Kazakhstan, and Slovenia, during which a wide range of issues related to international security and economic cooperation were discussed.

President Stjepan Mesić visited Kazakhstan on three occasions: on an official visit from 18 to 21 April 2002, to attend the inauguration of the President of Kazakhstan on 10–11 January 2006, and on a working visit in July 2007.

In 2003, a Consulate of the Republic of Kazakhstan was opened in Zagreb.

On 11 July 2006, President Nazarbayev paid a state visit to Croatia. During the visit, he met with President Stjepan Mesić and Prime Minister Ivo Sanader. A joint statement was adopted in which the Croatian side expressed support for Kazakhstan’s accession to the World Trade Organization.

On 19 December 2007, a presidential decree was signed to establish the Embassy of the Republic of Kazakhstan in the Republic of Croatia.

In December 2010, the President of Croatia, Ivo Josipović, visited Kazakhstan to participate in the OSCE Summit.

In December 2018, the Embassy of the Republic of Croatia in Kazakhstan was opened.

== Resident diplomatic missions ==
- Croatia has an embassy in Astana.
- Kazakhstan has an embassy in Zagreb.

== See also ==
- Foreign relations of Croatia
- Foreign relations of Kazakhstan
