= Social reforms of Andreas Papandreou =

The social reforms of Andreas Papandreou during his terms as Prime Minister of Greece (1981–1989 and 1993–1996) aimed to align Greece with European social standards and address long-standing inequalities following the fall of the Greek junta in 1974. The primary focus was expanding access to public services, empowering marginalized groups, and confronting the legacies of the Greek Civil War. While ambitious in scope, many of these reforms faced structural, financial, and political resistance, leading to only partial success and long-term challenges.

== Healthcare ==
From 1974 to 1981, Greece's healthcare was somewhere between advanced northern Europe and the developing southern regions. Both Papandreou's political party, the Panhellenic Socialist Movement (PASOK), and New Democracy recognized issues like a shortage of doctors in rural areas and sought healthcare reform, focusing on universal access and prevention. New Democracy, influenced by Dr. Spyros Doxiadis, proposed decentralized rural health centers but faced political and professional opposition, preventing these plans from moving forward.

When Papandreou came to power, he turned to Paraskevas Avgerinos to create a national healthcare system (ESY), modeled on Britain's National Health Service (NHS). The law was passed in September 1983 and was hailed as a landmark legislation, for it was the first time that an organized healthcare system was formally articulated within the framework of Greek Law. Between 1982 and 1987, healthcare spending increased, leading to the construction of new hospitals, expansion of coverage, and improved access, particularly in rural areas. However, Papandreou's reforms were not comprehensive due to budgetary constraints and a shortage of specialized doctors, as well as obstruction from professional unions, who refused to give up their private health insurance plans. The medical profession strongly opposed the reforms requiring doctors to relinquish private practice and work under state control. University and military doctors were temporarily exempt, pending a presidential decree that was never issued. Following prolonged protests and strikes, Health Minister Avgerinos resigned in January 1984.

Papandreou then appointed Georgios Gennimatas, who took a more pragmatic approach, partially implementing the reforms. However, the inclusion of doctors, irrespective of ideology, under a single organization with limited governmental supervision resulted in doctors having considerable political leverage. Soon, it was revealed that doctors were breaking the 1983 healthcare law with impunity by continuing to receive informal payments (fakelaki) from patients, undertaking private practice, and being able to choose their working hours. Gennimatas resigned in 1987, under pressure from the medical profession.

Ultimately, Papandreou's vision of a socialist healthcare system was never fully realized because doctors successfully convinced the public of their essential role, thereby halting the implementation of the reforms. The partial implementation of the reforms created new problems and made it more challenging for future governments to reform Greek healthcare. Wealthy Greeks, including Papandreou himself in 1988, continued to seek treatment abroad.

== Education ==
After the fall of the junta, Greece undertook major educational reforms. In 1976, Education Minister Georgios Rallis reinstated Georgios Papandreou's 1964 reforms, extending compulsory education from 6 to 9 years, replacing katharevousa with demotic Greek in schools, separating junior (Gymnasium) and senior high schools (Lyceum), and introducing vocational education. Papandreou continued these educational reforms, followed in 1981, aiming to broaden access. The Greek language adopted the simplified monotoniko system, entrance exams for senior high school were abolished, and Ancient Greek literature was taught in modern translation. Classical language requirements for university were dropped, school uniforms were eliminated, and civic education was expanded through student committees and new curricula. Vocational training also improved.

University access doubled between 1981 and 1986, though funding increases were limited. Administration became more democratic, involving staff and student representatives. However, education quality declined due to underfunded libraries, poor research infrastructure, and a lack of qualified staff. Moreover, PASOK's reforms of 1982 gave students a sense of entitlement to a degree by fighting to gain their demands with mass protests and occupations at the expense of critical thinking. Papandreou also abolished school inspectors, forcing them to retire, and weakened the authority of headmasters, giving more power to teacher committees. Promotions became automatic, based on seniority rather than merit. Political patronage influenced staffing, a trend continued by later governments. Public schools fell behind private ones in performance, and families turned to private tutoring and foreign universities. By 1999, Greek families were spending more on education than almost any other Europeans, despite constitutional guarantees of free education.

== Elevation of women and their inclusion in the economy ==
The 1975 Greek Constitution guaranteed equality under the law for men and women (Article 4) and equal pay (Article 22), but many pre-junta laws were outdated. Greek law was also expected to align with European standards under the Treaty of Rome. In 1974, women's advocacy groups emerged, with Margaret Chant, the wife of Prime Minister Papandreou, playing a key role.

In 1981, Papandreou's "Social Contract" introduced liberal reforms that redefined gender roles, emphasizing individuals over the family and reducing Church and state control over private life. These reforms legalized civil marriage, abolished dowries, decriminalized adultery, and allowed divorce by mutual consent. Women's participation in education and the workforce increased, and in 1986, abortion was decriminalized. Further reforms in the 1980s improved women's work-life balance, including 14 weeks of maternity leave, paid at 66% of salary, and the establishment of parental leave, childcare centers, and incentives for women in agricultural cooperatives. Additionally, women with unmarried children under 21 gained the right to retire at 55. However, women remained underrepresented in politics, with fewer than 5% of deputies being women.

Papandreou's reforms also led to a steep decline in the total fertility rate from 2.2 in 1980, just above the 2.1 threshold for stabilizing the population, to 1.4 by 1989, which led to a shrinking Greek population. The demographics of Greece have not recovered from this sharp decline in the fertility rate, placing pressure on Greek society and the economy due to population decline. In 1988, deaths exceeded births, although immigration offset the population decline until 2010; between 2008 and 2018, Greece's population dropped by 385,000, or 3.5% of the 2008 population. A 2016 demographics analysis estimates that Greece might lose up to a quarter of its population by 2050.

== Social reconciliation ==
After the restoration of democracy in 1974, healing the wounds caused by the Greek Civil War was pressing since the junta had only exacerbated them. In this direction, Karamanlis decriminalized the Communist Party and opened the borders to exiled Greeks who had fled the junta and civil war to return home, including Melina Merkouri, Mikis Theodorakis, and Cornelius Castoriadis. Approximately 25,000 returned after passing security screening from 1974 to 1981. However, Karamanlis' governments maintained the post-civil war state's anticommunist stance; that is, it was challenging to obtain a civil service job as a communist. Minister of Interior Konstantinos Stefanopoulos explained the conservative viewpoint as "Greeks would never forgive those who had taken up arms against the Nation."

Papandreou made progress in this direction, but unlike Karamanlis, he was pressured to do more since he relied on left-leaning voting blocks (see details in Papandreou's populism). In December 1982, Papandreou dropped the security screening requirement, allowing the return of another potential 22,000 returnees; the most notable was Markos Vafiadis at age 77, but excluded any Slav-Macedonian war veterans (comprising half the group) who participated in the resistance.

Papandreou introduced a law in 1985 for civil servants dismissed for political reasons to restore their pensions. All formal Civil War commemorations were abolished, including ceremonies commemorating Dekemvriana. The first law recognizing the Greek Resistance was passed in 1949, which excluded left-leaning partisan groups that fought against the Greek State in the Greek Civil War. On 20 September 1982, Papandreou's government passed a law that abolished this exception, granting EAM/ELAS members the war veteran status and pension rights. Papandreou touted this as "the gravestone of the spirit of national division." However, New Democracy deputies, many of whose senior members were participants in the civil war, denounced it as a "shameless attempt to whitewash the communist crimes during and after the war."

== Notes ==
1. Civil marriage was a novelty in Greek culture, and it was strongly opposed by the Church of Greece, which was the only institution in Greece that legally performed marriages before this. Couples seeking a civil marriage had to get married outside Greece, generally in Italy.
