= Israel–Kazakhstan relations =

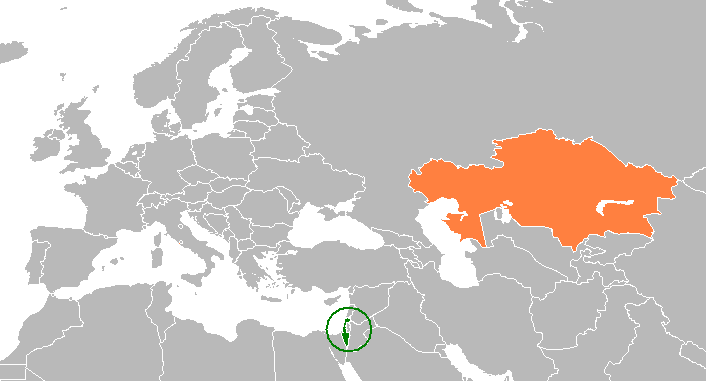

- Israel: Kazakhstan

Israel–Kazakhstan relations refers to the current and historical relations between the State of Israel and the Republic of Kazakhstan. The countries established diplomatic relations on April 10, 1992. The embassy of Israel in Almaty, Kazakhstan opened in August 1992 (later in was relocated to Astana). The embassy of Kazakhstan in Tel Aviv, Israel opened in May 1996. In 2004, Chamber of Commerce and Industry Israel-Kazakhstan was established in Israel in order to develop and expand trade and economic relations.

== History ==
The Kazakhstan Secretary of State met with Moshe Kamkhy, Israel's ambassador to Uzbekistan in August 2004 to discuss social and economic ties between the countries and moving the Israeli Embassy to Astana.

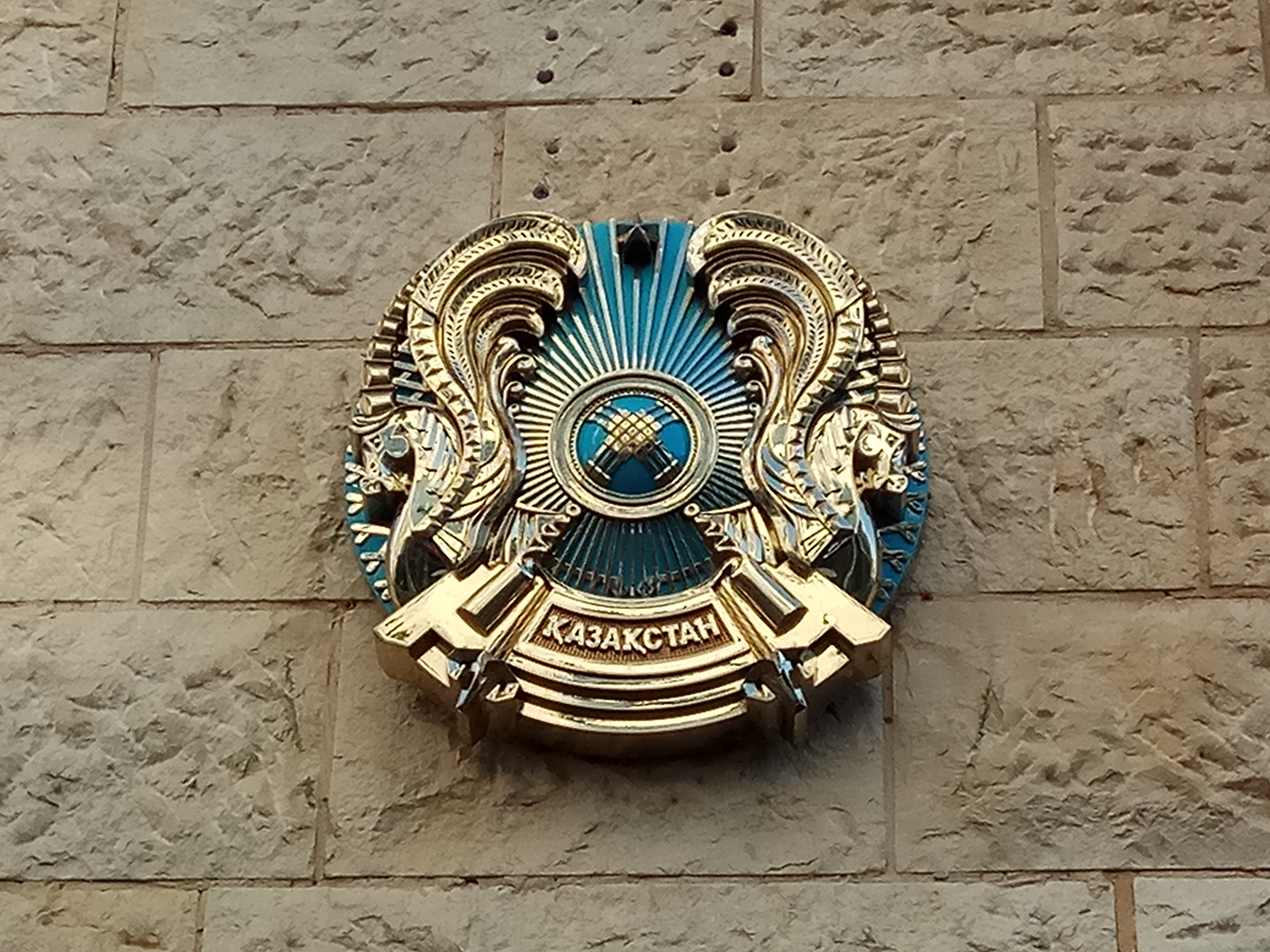
Kazakhstan coat of arms, Tel Aviv

The two countries maintain close contacts in the defense and intelligence sector. Ninety-five Kazakh farmers, managers, and scientists have trained in Israel.

In April 2009, Kazakhstan's National Security Committee claimed that the country's Ministry of Defense knowingly bought faulty artillery and defense systems from Israeli weapons manufacturers. Kazhimurat Mayermanov, a deputy defense minister, and Boris Sheinkman, an Israeli businessman, were arrested in connection with the case.

In June 2009, Israeli President Shimon Peres visited Kazakhstan, as he had a number of times as foreign minister.

Israeli Prime Minister Benjamin Netanyahu attended the Kazakh-Israeli business forum in Astana in December 2016. Netanyahu's visit to Kazakhstan was the first by an Israeli head of government.

Some Israeli commentators have signaled that Israel's relations with the Central Asian states, including Kazakhstan, are part of the country's involvement in "The Great Game" for control over the strategic natural resources in Central Asia.

In November 2025, the Government of Kazakhstan formally acceded to the Abraham Accords framework following a trilateral agreement with U.S. President Donald Trump and Israeli Prime Minister Benjamin Netanyahu. This accession expanded the scope of the Accords, which were originally signed in 2020 to normalize relations between Israel and the United Arab Emirates, Bahrain, Sudan, and Morocco. And it led to the expansion of this agreement to the countries of Central Asia. However, distinct from those foundational agreements, Kazakhstan had already maintained full diplomatic relations with Israel since 1992. In a statement confirming the move, President Kassym-Jomart Tokayev described Kazakhstan's entry into the framework as a strategic effort to "make a meaningful contribution to stabilizing the situation" in the Middle East.

== Economic collaboration ==
Over 25% of Israel's oil purchases are from Kazakhstan, and Kazakhstan is seeking to increase oil sales to Israel.

Israel and Kazakhstan launched the Israel-Kazakhstan Irrigation Demonstration Center in the Almaty region. Israel, Kazakhstan Launch Joint Irrigation Project in Almaty Region|url In 2004, Israel established the Israel-Kazakhstan Chamber of Commerce in order to develop and expand trade and economic relations. The Chairmen Chamber of Commerce Israel-Kazakhstan – Michael Roee.

In January 2026, Israeli Foreign Minister Gideon Sa’ar conducted an official visit to Astana, marking the first visit by an Israeli foreign minister to the country in more than 15 years. During the trip, Sa’ar met with senior Kazakh officials to discuss bilateral relations and regional diplomacy, against the backdrop of expanding international engagement between Israel and Central Asia. The visit took place following Kazakhstan’s announcement that it would join the Abraham Accords, a U.S.-brokered framework aimed at strengthening ties between Israel and Muslim-majority countries, a move described by the Associated Press as largely symbolic given the two countries’ longstanding diplomatic relations. The visit also included the signing of a bilateral memorandum to exempt citizens of Israel and Kazakhstan from tourist visas and was accompanied by a business delegation representing sectors such as cyber, health, agriculture, and food security, reflecting efforts to strengthen economic collaboration between the two countries.

== Jewish community in Kazakhstan ==
Kazakhstan's Jewish population surged dramatically when Stalin exiled thousands of Jews from the former Pale of Settlement. An additional 8,500 Jews escaped during the Second World War and fled to Kazakhstan. Since 1989, approximately 10,000 Kazakh Jews have relocated to Israel.

The Beit Rachel synagogue in Astana, opened in 2004, is the largest in Central Asia.

In 1999, all of Kazakhstan's Jewish communities were brought together under the All-Kazakhstan Jewish Congress. The country's first synagogue was opened in 2001 by Chabad Lubavitch, and a community center featuring a Jewish day school and summer camps, was also set up.

Today, Kazakhstan's Jewish community of 3,300 has more than 20 Jewish organizations and 14 day schools. Over 700 Jewish students attend 14 Jewish day schools across the country and The Jewish Agency for Israel also sponsors several youth centers across the country where Jewish teens are taught Jewish culture and Hebrew.

The Jewish community of Kazakhstan continues its cultural heritage. In 2007, a youth dance and vocal group Prahim was created in Almaty. The highlight of Prahim's repertoire is the popular Yiddish song, "Bei Mir Bistu Shein", which the band performs in four languages: Kazakh, Russian, Yiddish and Hebrew. In October 2014 the group performed several concerts in Boston and New York City. A reciprocal visit by American Jewish youth performers to Kazakhstan was planned for spring 2015.

In September 2016, the central synagogue in Almaty held the twelfth Torah scroll introduction ceremony. It was a tribute to Rabbi Levi Yitzchak Schneerson, the Lubavitch Rebbe's father, after which the Jewish centre of Kazakhstan, Chabad Lubavitch, was named.

== Israeli Ambassadors to Kazakhstan ==
1. Ben-Zion Carmel (1993–1996)
2. Israel Mei-Ami (1996 – 2002, 2008 – 2012)
3. Moshe Kimkhi (2002–2004)
4. Michael Lotem (2004–2006)
5. Ran Yishai (2006–2008)
6. Eliyahu Tasman (2012–2015)
7. Michael Brodsky (6 September 2015 – 2018)
8. Liat Vekselman (2018-)
9. Yoav Bistrisky (2025-)

== Resident diplomatic missions ==
- Israel has an embassy in Astana.
- Kazakhstan has an embassy in Tel Aviv.

== See also ==
- Foreign relations of Israel
- Foreign relations of Kazakhstan
- Jews in Kazakhstan
- List of ambassadors of Israel to Kazakhstan
