= Foreign relations of Kazakhstan =

Kazakhstan's approach to foreign relations is multifaceted and strategic, reflecting the country's unique geopolitical position, historical context, and economic ambitions. At the heart of its international diplomacy is a multivector foreign policy, which aims to maintain balanced and diverse relations with all major global powers and regional neighbours. Kazakhstan is a member of the United Nations, Collective Security Treaty Organization, Organization for Security and Co-operation in Europe (which it chaired in 2010), North Atlantic Cooperation Council, Commonwealth of Independent States, the Shanghai Cooperation Organisation, and NATO's Partnership for Peace program. Kazakhstan established a customs union with Russia and Belarus which eventually became the Eurasian Economic Union. President Nazarbayev has prioritized economic diplomacy into Kazakhstan's foreign policy.

Economic cooperation and development are pivotal in Kazakhstan's foreign policy framework. The nation actively seeks to attract foreign investment, especially in its oil and gas sectors. Kazakhstan is keen on expanding its economic ties across the globe, understanding the critical role of economic interdependence in fostering stable international relations.

In recent years, the government of Kazakhstan have stated that one of their main goals is to become more integrated with the Asia-Pacific region, which they describe as a "rapidly developing" region. This involves becoming more integrated on both an economic level and a people to people level. As part of this push, Kazakh diplomas became recognized across many countries in Asia-Pacific in 2026.

Kazakhstan is a proponent of nuclear non-proliferation, having renounced its nuclear arsenal after the dissolution of the Soviet Union. The country actively participates in global discussions on nuclear disarmament and non-proliferation, leveraging its history to influence these debates. In December 2010, Kazakhstan held its first OSCE summit since 1999.

Kazakhstan has also increasingly positioned itself as a mediator in international disputes, offering its territory as a neutral ground for diplomatic engagement and hosting high-profile international meetings and negotiations.

Environmental sustainability is another focus of Kazakhstan's international engagement. Confronted with challenges like the desiccation of the Aral Sea, Kazakhstan advocates for global cooperation on environmental issues, emphasizing the necessity of collective action to address ecological concerns.

Kazakhstan’s foreign policy is grounded in a respect for international law, sovereignty, and the territorial integrity of states. The nation is an active participant in the United Nations and various international organisations.

== Multilateral agreements ==
Kazakhstan, since gaining independence in 1991, has been an active participant in the international community, signing numerous multilateral agreements.

Kazakhstan became a member of the UN in 1992 and has since been a participant in various UN treaties and conventions.

Kazakhstan joined the Nuclear Non-Proliferation Treaty as a non-nuclear weapon state in 1993, emphasizing its commitment to nuclear disarmament and non-proliferation.

Kazakhstan signed the Comprehensive Nuclear-Test-Ban Treaty in 1996, further solidifying its stance against nuclear testing.

Kazakhstan is a founding member of the Shanghai Cooperation Organization, a political, economic, and security organization established in 2001, along with China, Russia, Kyrgyzstan, Tajikistan, and Uzbekistan.

Kazakhstan became a World Trade Organization member in 2015, committing to the organisation's rules and regulations to promote international trade.

In 2015 Kazakhstan joined the Inter-American Convention on Mutual Assistance in Criminal Matters. In September the Kazakh Senate ratified the Convention, which unites 26 countries, including the United States, South Korea, Canada, Mexico, Brazil, Venezuela and other countries.

In December 2015, the European Union and Kazakhstan signed an Enhanced Partnership and Cooperation Agreement (EPCA). This new Agreement, the first of its kind with a Central Asian partner, brought relations between the EU and Kazakhstan to a new level and represented an important milestone in more than 25 years of EU-Kazakhstan relations.

Kazakhstan is a signatory to the Paris Agreement on Climate Change within the United Nations Framework Convention on Climate Change (UNFCCC), dealing with greenhouse-gas-emissions mitigation, adaptation, and finance.

In November 2025 Kazakhstan confirmed that it had joined the Abraham Accords. The country has maintained diplomatic relations with Israel since 1992.

== Economic diplomacy ==
The Foreign Ministry of Kazakhstan assumed the new function of attracting investments to Kazakhstan in December 2018. As part of the new responsibilities, the Ministry oversees activities in attracting foreign investment and promoting Kazakh exports abroad, taking away these responsibilities from the reformed Ministry for Investment and Development. Two main objectives of Kazakhstan's economic diplomacy include comprehensive support of Kazakh business abroad and promotion of non-resource export. These objectives are set to help achieve the goals of diversifying the economy, creating new jobs, promoting innovative technologies and attracting foreign investors.

As part of economic diplomacy, Kazakhstan compiled a list of 40 countries its Foreign Ministry is to target in a bid to attract more foreign investment. Coordinated by the Foreign Ministry, Kazakhstan's diplomatic missions also address issues of strategic interest to Kazakhstan's business community in their receiving states.

== Border issues ==
Kazakhstan resolved the border determination issues with Kyrgyzstan in 2001, Uzbekistan in 2002, and Turkmenistan in 2017. The country became the first country to resolve border issues with the countries of the region.

Kazakhstan and China resolved their longstanding border issues, fostering a strong partnership that enabled increased investment and economic collaboration. The resolution of these border disputes was pivotal in the development of Kazakh-Chinese economic ties and in combating terrorism. This resolution was also a significant step in reducing tensions and enhancing security in the region.

Kazakhstan reached an agreement on the delimitation of adjacent sections of the Caspian Sea with Russia and Azerbaijan. This agreement was a crucial step in defining the borders of the national sectors of the Caspian seabed for Kazakhstan, Russia, and Azerbaijan, allowing these littoral states exclusive rights for the development and use of the seabed. Kazakhstan, along with Azerbaijan, Iran, the Russian Federation, and Turkmenistan, signed the Convention on the Legal Status of the Caspian Sea. This convention, signed in Aktau, Kazakhstan, represented a significant diplomatic achievement, concluding more than two decades of negotiations.

== Nuclear weapons non-proliferation ==
When the Soviet Union collapsed in December 1991, Kazakhstan inherited 1,410 nuclear warheads and the Semipalatinsk nuclear-weapon test site. By April 1995, Kazakhstan had returned the warheads to Russia and, by July 2000, had destroyed the nuclear testing infrastructure at Semipalatinsk.

Kazakhstan launched The ATOM (Abolish Testing. Our Mission) Project, an international campaign aimed at raising awareness about the human and environmental impacts of nuclear weapons testing. The project seeks to bring an end to nuclear weapons testing globally and to achieve a nuclear-weapon-free world.

Kazakhstan was instrumental in the establishment of the Central Asian Nuclear-Weapon-Free Zone (CANWFZ), which includes Kazakhstan, Kyrgyzstan, Tajikistan, Turkmenistan, and Uzbekistan. This zone is the first in the Northern Hemisphere and is significant for regional security.

On 2 December 2009, UN secretary general Ban Ki-moon and the Republic of Kazakhstan designated 29 August as International Day against Nuclear Tests, the anniversary of the date that Kazakhstan closed the Semipalatinsk test site in 1991.

Kazakhstan is a strong supporter of the CTBT and advocates for its universal adoption and entry into force. The country has also established a network of monitoring stations as part of the International Monitoring System to detect nuclear tests.

The contribution of Kazakhstan's President Nazarbayev to nuclear non-proliferation was highly recognized by Japan. During his visit to Japan in November 2016, Nursultan Nazarbayev was awarded the title of special honorary citizen of Hiroshima for his non-proliferation efforts.

== Peacekeeping initiatives ==
The first country to which Kazakhstan deployed its peacekeeping forces was Tajikistan. On 11 November 1992, due to a worsening situation, the Supreme Soviet of Tajikistan appealed to the CIS countries for peacekeeping support. On 22 January 1993, at a CIS summit in Minsk, state leaders reviewed and approved this request. President Nursultan Nazarbayev ordered a composite battalion of 700 soldiers, composed of border, internal, and ground forces, to be sent to Tajikistan to secure a section of the border with Afghanistan. During the mission, Kazakhstani soldiers successfully repelled multiple attacks by armed groups attempting to cross into Tajikistan, establishing a reliable barrier against arms and drug smuggling. The Kazakhstani battalion remained stationed on the Afghanistan–Tajikistan border until 2001 when the situation stabilized.

Kazakhstan peacekeepers have also participated in operations in Iraq, where they neutralized approximately 4 million explosive devices. Additionally, Kazakhstan peacekeeping forces have been deployed to Western Sahara, Côte d’Ivoire, and Lebanon. In 1987, Nazarbayev acted as a mediator in the Nagorno-Karabakh conflict. On 27 August 1992, he initiated trilateral negotiations in Almaty with the foreign ministers of Azerbaijan, Armenia, and Kazakhstan. These discussions led to an agreement on 1 September 1992, to halt hostilities between Azerbaijan and Armenia.

In 2010, Nazarbayev played a key role in resolving the crisis in Kyrgyzstan. He held talks with former president Kurmanbek Bakiyev and arranged for his evacuation to Kazakhstan, thereby helping prevent a civil war.

President Nazarbayev also supported efforts to resolve the Russo-Ukrainian War from 2014 onwards. Kazakhstan organized Normandy Format talks with leaders from Russia, Ukraine, France, and Germany on 11–12 February 2015, in Minsk, which aimed to pave the way toward peace.

Kazakhstan has been actively involved in the Syrian conflict resolution process. In 2015, at Nazarbayev’s initiative, meetings among Syrian opposition groups were held in Astana, resulting in the Astana Initiative. Nazarbayev also conducted discussions with leaders from the Muslim world, including the King of Jordan, the Emir of Qatar, and the President of Iran, seeking to foster a peaceful resolution to the Syrian crisis.

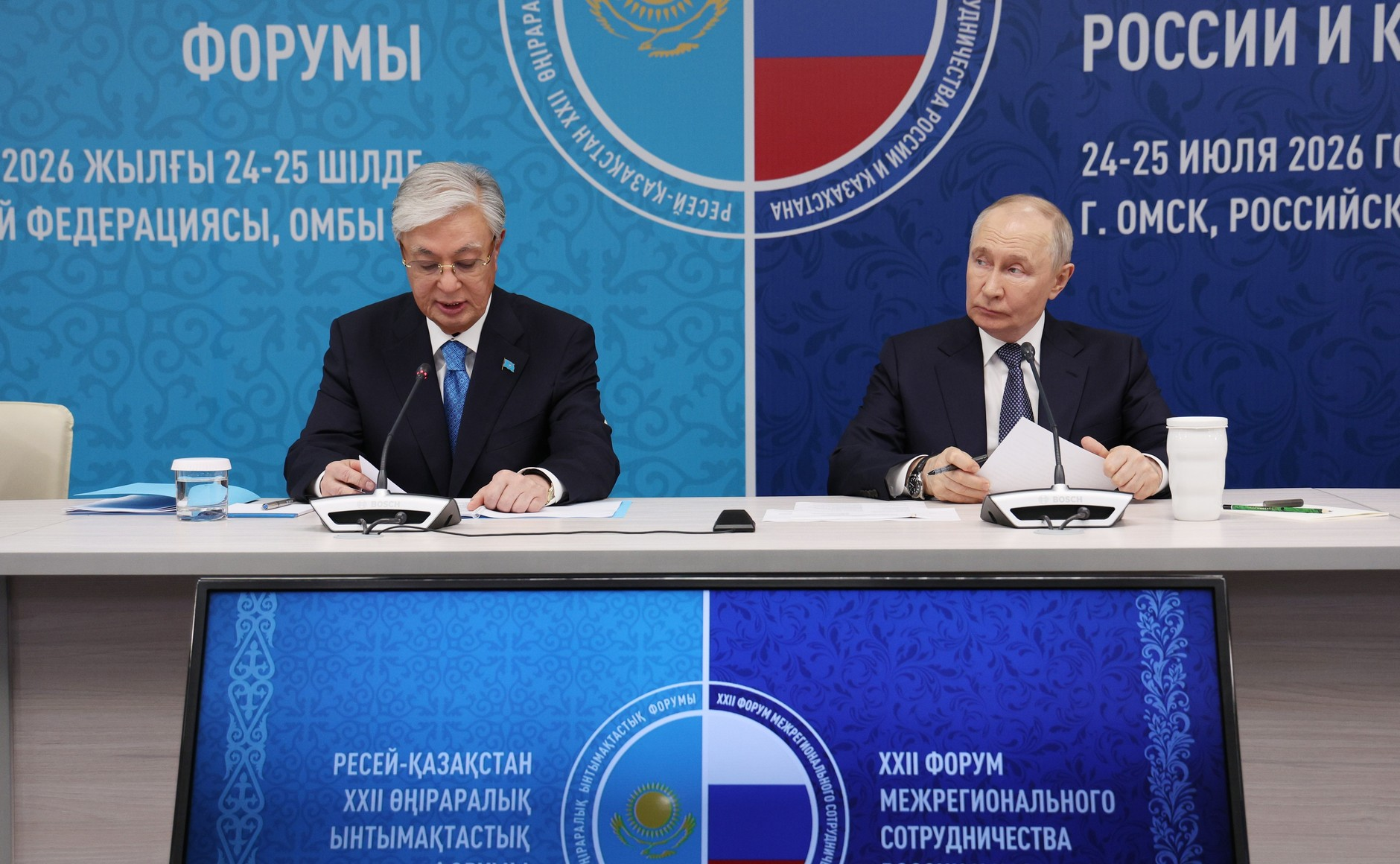
Kazakh President Kassym-Jomart Tokayev and Russian President Vladimir Putin in Omsk, Russia, 25 July 2026

On 25 July 2026, during a meeting with Russian President Vladimir Putin in Omsk, President Kassym-Jomart Tokayev called for the Russo-Ukrainian war to be “frozen” and for negotiations to resume on the basis of what he described as the “Istanbul Formula 2.0”. He expressed concern over the continued loss of life and said that the conflict should be brought to an end.

Kazakhstan has played an active role in international organizations. In 2010, Kazakhstan chaired the OSCE, and in 2011, the Organization of Islamic Cooperation. Kazakhstan has been actively involved in the Shanghai Cooperation Organization since its inception and chaired it in 2010–2011. In 2016, Kazakhstan was elected as a non-permanent member of the United Nations Security Council for 2017–2018.

== Illicit drugs ==
Illegal cannabis and, to a lesser extent, opium production in Kazakhstan is an international issue since much of the crop ends up being sold in other countries, particularly in other member-states of Commonwealth of Independent States (CIS). In 1998, the United Nations Office on Drugs and Crime estimated that a "minimum of 1,517 tons of cannabis was harvested" in Kazakhstan.

With the fall of the Soviet Union, Kazakhstan became a major transit country for narcotics produced in Southwest Asia, primarily from Afghanistan. In 2001, Kazakh authorities reported 1,320 cases of drug trafficking and seized 18 metric tons of narcotics. However, this is viewed as a fraction of the actual total volume trafficked and widespread corruption continues to hamper government anti-drug efforts; Transparency International gave Kazakhstan a score of 2.2, on a scale of 0–10 with 0 indicating a "highly corrupt" state. Russia and other parts of Europe are the main markets for these drugs although drug use is growing in Kazakhstan as well.

== KazAID ==
In November 2014 Kazakh Foreign Minister and Resident Representative of UNDP in Kazakhstan signed a project document supporting Kazakhstan's Foreign Affairs Ministry in forming KazAID, a system of Official Development Assistance (ODA). KazAID is the first ODA programme among the Central Asian states. The KazAID program implies technical assistance and humanitarian aid to Afghanistan. As of 2016, Kazakhstan provided Afghanistan with 20,000 tons of food products valued at some $20 million.

Kazakhstan's Ministry of Foreign Affairs with assistance of the UNDP and Japan International Cooperation Agency (JICA) leads ODA titled "Promoting Kazakhstan's ODA Cooperation with Afghanistan." The ODA is aimed at expanding economic independence and rights of Afghan women. The project marks Kazakhstan's first international cooperation for Afghanistan in the framework of national system of ODA.

Over the past two decades, Kazakhstan has distributed more than $500 million for ODA activities. Countries of Central Asia and Afghanistan are a priority for Kazakhstan's ODA.

== Diplomatic relations ==
List of countries which Kazakhstan maintains diplomatic relations with:

| # | Country | Date |
|---|---|---|
| 1 | Nigeria | 16 December 1991 |
| 2 | United States | 26 December 1991 |
| 3 | China | 3 January 1992 |
| 4 | United Kingdom | 19 January 1992 |
| 5 | Mongolia | 22 January 1992 |
| 6 | France | 25 January 1992 |
| 7 | Japan | 26 January 1992 |
| 8 | North Korea | 28 January 1992 |
| 9 | South Korea | 28 January 1992 |
| 10 | Iran | 29 January 1992 |
| 11 | Germany | 11 February 1992 |
| 12 | Spain | 11 February 1992 |
| 13 | Afghanistan | 12 February 1992 |
| 14 | Austria | 14 February 1992 |
| 15 | India | 22 February 1992 |
| 16 | Pakistan | 24 February 1992 |
| 17 | Bangladesh | 1 March 1992 |
| 18 | Turkey | 2 March 1992 |
| 19 | South Africa | 5 March 1992 |
| 20 | Egypt | 6 March 1992 |
| 21 | Libya | 13 March 1992 |
| 22 | Malaysia | 16 March 1992 |
| 23 | Cuba | 24 March 1992 |
| 24 | Philippines | 25 March 1992 |
| 25 | Syria | 27 March 1992 |
| 26 | Cyprus | 2 April 1992 |
| 27 | Hungary | 2 April 1992 |
| — | State of Palestine | 6 April 1992 |
| 28 | Poland | 6 April 1992 |
| 29 | Sweden | 7 April 1992 |
| 30 | Canada | 10 April 1992 |
| 31 | Ireland | 10 April 1992 |
| 32 | Israel | 10 April 1992 |
| 33 | Madagascar | 10 April 1992 |
| 34 | Zimbabwe | 10 April 1992 |
| 35 | Mexico | 13 April 1992 |
| 36 | Oman | 27 April 1992 |
| 37 | Denmark | 7 May 1992 |
| 38 | New Zealand | 12 May 1992 |
| 39 | Finland | 13 May 1992 |
| 40 | Morocco | 26 May 1992 |
| 41 | Estonia | 27 May 1992 |
| 42 | Bahrain | 28 May 1992 |
| 43 | Switzerland | 1 June 1992 |
| 44 | Bulgaria | 5 June 1992 |
| 45 | Norway | 5 June 1992 |
| 46 | Guinea | 6 June 1992 |
| 47 | Lithuania | 15 June 1992 |
| 48 | Australia | 22 June 1992 |
| 49 | Luxembourg | 29 June 1992 |
| 50 | Sri Lanka | 29 June 1992 |
| 51 | Vietnam | 29 June 1992 |
| 52 | Thailand | 6 July 1992 |
| 53 | Romania | 15 July 1992 |
| 54 | Colombia | 23 July 1992 |
| 55 | Georgia | 23 July 1992 |
| 56 | Ukraine | 23 July 1992 |
| 57 | Cape Verde | 30 July 1992 |
| 58 | Ghana | 14 August 1992 |
| 59 | Belgium | 25 August 1992 |
| 60 | Portugal | 19 August 1992 |
| 61 | Italy | 21 August 1992 |
| 62 | Armenia | 27 August 1992 |
| 63 | Azerbaijan | 27 August 1992 |
| 64 | United Arab Emirates | 1 September 1992 |
| 65 | Netherlands | 10 September 1992 |
| 66 | Belarus | 16 September 1992 |
| 67 | Moldova | 16 September 1992 |
| 68 | Greece | 1 October 1992 |
| 69 | Turkmenistan | 5 October 1992 |
| 70 | Kyrgyzstan | 15 October 1992 |
| — | Holy See | 17 October 1992 |
| 71 | Croatia | 20 October 1992 |
| 72 | Slovenia | 20 October 1992 |
| 73 | Russia | 22 October 1992 |
| 74 | Tunisia | 23 November 1992 |
| 75 | Uzbekistan | 23 November 1992 |
| 76 | Mali | 26 November 1992 |
| 77 | Latvia | 10 December 1992 |
| 78 | Czech Republic | 1 January 1993 |
| 79 | Slovakia | 1 January 1993 |
| 80 | Tajikistan | 7 January 1993 |
| 81 | Kuwait | 11 January 1993 |
| 82 | Malta | 4 February 1993 |
| 83 | Jordan | 9 February 1993 |
| 84 | Singapore | 30 March 1993 |
| 85 | Lebanon | 20 April 1993 |
| 86 | Mauritania | 28 April 1993 |
| 87 | Indonesia | 2 June 1993 |
| 88 | Argentina | 25 June 1993 |
| 89 | Qatar | 1 July 1993 |
| 90 | Uruguay | 30 July 1993 |
| 91 | Chile | 19 August 1993 |
| 92 | Albania | 21 September 1993 |
| 93 | Brazil | 22 September 1993 |
| 94 | Kenya | 15 November 1993 |
| 95 | Cambodia | 25 February 1994 |
| 96 | Saudi Arabia | 30 April 1994 |
| 97 | Nicaragua | 5 July 1994 |
| 98 | Angola | 3 October 1994 |
| 99 | North Macedonia | 1 June 1995 |
| 100 | Jamaica | 27 July 1995 |
| 101 | Panama | 28 July 1995 |
| 102 | Iraq | 14 September 1995 |
| 103 | Honduras | 28 November 1995 |
| 104 | Algeria | 15 March 1996 |
| 105 | Zambia | 25 March 1996 |
| 106 | Venezuela | 8 May 1996 |
| 107 | Costa Rica | 1 October 1996 |
| 108 | Serbia | 10 December 1996 |
| 109 | Bosnia and Herzegovina | 20 December 1996 |
| 110 | Peru | 6 February 1997 |
| 111 | Laos | 19 September 1997 |
| 112 | Yemen | 9 December 1997 |
| 113 | Chad | 21 July 1999 |
| 114 | Republic of the Congo | 21 September 1999 |
| 115 | Myanmar | 23 September 1999 |
| 116 | Maldives | 15 March 2000 |
| 117 | Brunei | 14 June 2000 |
| — | Sovereign Military Order of Malta | 26 April 2001 |
| 118 | Iceland | 14 May 2004 |
| 119 | Paraguay | 20 September 2004 |
| 120 | San Marino | 20 September 2004 |
| 121 | Montenegro | 14 July 2006 |
| 122 | Liechtenstein | 31 January 2007 |
| 123 | Antigua and Barbuda | 16 November 2007 |
| 124 | Andorra | 30 January 2008 |
| 125 | Senegal | 13 March 2008 |
| 126 | Mozambique | 18 June 2008 |
| 127 | Sudan | 19 June 2008 |
| 128 | Uganda | 20 June 2008 |
| 129 | Monaco | 15 January 2009 |
| 130 | Cameroon | 14 May 2009 |
| 131 | Gabon | 23 May 2009 |
| 132 | Ivory Coast | 23 May 2009 |
| 133 | Djibouti | 5 May 2010 |
| 134 | Burkina Faso | 10 February 2011 |
| 135 | Gambia | 26 April 2011 |
| 136 | Dominican Republic | 7 June 2011 |
| 137 | Guatemala | 2 September 2011 |
| 138 | Ethiopia | 5 September 2011 |
| 139 | Benin | 13 September 2011 |
| 140 | Ecuador | 23 January 2012 |
| 141 | Comoros | 29 March 2012 |
| 142 | Rwanda | 10 May 2012 |
| 143 | Fiji | 6 June 2012 |
| 144 | Tuvalu | 27 July 2012 |
| 145 | Solomon Islands | 17 August 2012 |
| 146 | Grenada | 15 November 2012 |
| 147 | Palau | 19 November 2012 |
| 148 | Bhutan | 20 November 2012 |
| 149 | Saint Vincent and the Grenadines | 21 November 2012 |
| 150 | Saint Lucia | 5 December 2012 |
| 151 | Guyana | 11 January 2013 |
| 152 | Samoa | 7 February 2013 |
| 153 | Suriname | 11 April 2013 |
| 154 | Guinea-Bissau | 19 April 2013 |
| 155 | Dominica | 30 April 2013 |
| 156 | Saint Kitts and Nevis | 8 May 2013 |
| 157 | Bolivia | 17 May 2013 |
| 158 | Haiti | 20 September 2013 |
| 159 | Belize | 7 November 2013 |
| 160 | Trinidad and Tobago | 16 January 2014 |
| 161 | El Salvador | 30 January 2014 |
| 162 | Kiribati | 18 February 2014 |
| 163 | Vanuatu | 19 February 2014 |
| 164 | Seychelles | 11 March 2014 |
| 165 | Namibia | 7 October 2014 |
| 166 | Togo | 9 October 2014 |
| 167 | Mauritius | 15 October 2014 |
| 168 | Sierra Leone | 20 November 2014 |
| 169 | São Tomé and Príncipe | 20 November 2014 |
| 170 | Burundi | 4 December 2014 |
| 171 | Bahamas | 8 December 2014 |
| 172 | Tonga | 17 March 2015 |
| 173 | Lesotho | 2 April 2015 |
| 174 | Nepal | 30 June 2015 |
| 175 | Federated States of Micronesia | 27 October 2015 |
| 176 | Liberia | 27 April 2016 |
| 177 | Eswatini | 16 May 2016 |
| 178 | Eritrea | 7 December 2016 |
| 179 | Equatorial Guinea | 24 May 2017 |
| 180 | Niger | 21 September 2017 |
| 181 | Barbados | 27 March 2018 |
| 182 | Marshall Islands | 12 February 2019 |
| 183 | Tanzania | 13 February 2019 |
| 184 | Democratic Republic of the Congo | 2022 |
| 185 | Papua New Guinea | 24 March 2023 |
| 186 | Somalia | 27 August 2025 |
| 187 | Botswana | 30 October 2025 |
| 188 | South Sudan | 12 December 2025 |
| 189 | Central African Republic | 22 September 2026 |
| 190 | Timor-Leste | 24 September 2026 |
| 191 | Malawi | 25 September 2026 |
| 192 | Nauru | 30 October 2026 |

== Bilateral relations ==
=== Multilateral ===
| Organization | Formal Relations Began | Notes |
|---|---|---|
| European Union | | See Kazakhstan–European Union relations |
| NATO | | See Kazakhstan–NATO relations |

=== Africa ===
Kazakhstan has proactively worked to establish ties with African nations. Deputy Minister of Foreign Affairs Askar Mussinov participated in the 25th Assembly of Heads of State and Government of the African Union in Johannesburg, South Africa 12–15 June.

Responding to an international call to help ease the suffering that Ebola is causing in West Africa, Kazakhstan transferred $50,000 to the UN Ebola Trust Fund in late 2014. After that Astana expressed its intention to provide $300,000 to the African Union's special project to fight Ebola.

The 1st day of the VIII Astana Economic Forum held on 21 May 2015, was dedicated to Africa and was titled "Africa – the Next Driver of the Global Economy". The Foreign Minister of Kazakhstan Erlan Idrissov noted: "We recognise that Africa is a continent with huge potential. It has enormous human capital and a large, young population.” More than 20 permanent representatives to the United Nations (UN) from Africa participated in the session.

On 28 September 2015, Kazakhstan and the UNDP signed a $2 million cost-sharing agreement launching a new program to help 45 African countries implement the UN's Sustainable Development Goals.

On 8 August 2024, Kazakhstan and Congo-Brazzaville signed several cooperation agreements, covering the oil and gas industry, information and communication technologies, and cyber security.

| Country | Formal Relations Began | Notes |
|---|---|---|
| Egypt | 6 March 1992 | See Egypt–Kazakhstan relations: Egypt has an embassy in Astana.; Kazakhstan has an embassy in Cairo. |
| Ethiopia | 5 September 2011 | Ethiopia is accredited to Kazakhstan from its embassy in Ankara, Turkey.; Kazakhstan has an embassy in Addis Ababa. |
| Libya | 13 March 1992 | See Kazakhstan–Libya relations: Kazakhstan is accredited to Libya from its embassy in Cairo, Egypt.; Libya has an embassy in Astana. |
| South Africa | 5 March 1992 | Kazakhstan has an embassy in Pretoria.; South Africa has an embassy in Astana. |

=== Americas ===
Kazakhstan's Deputy Foreign Minister Yerzhan Ashikbayev said that Kazakhstan is seeking "new perspectives" and boosting its relations with Latin American nations via a series of diplomatic visits.

Ashikbayev attended the 44th General Assembly of the Organization of American States in Asuncion, Paraguay on 4 June. Kazakhstan was the largest delegation among the conference's 39 observer nations.

The Secretary General of the Organization of American States (OAS), José Miguel Insulza, on 3 June met with the Deputy Foreign Minister, Yerzhan Ashikbayev, in Asunción, Paraguay, for the 44th OAS General Assembly where Ashikbayev presented a contribution to help fund important OAS programs.

Foreign Minister Erlan Idrissov conducted a four-day visit to Mexico on 17–20 September 2014. During his visit Idrissov met with Mexican Economy Secretary Ildefonso Guajardo, Foreign Secretary Jose Antonio Meade, former President Vicente Fox, other senior officials and business leaders. The Minister and his delegation will view the future site of Kazakhstan's embassy in Mexico City. Idrissov said that the main objective of his visit was to build a bridge between Latin America and Eurasia. The Foreign Minister underlined that economic and trade collaboration with Kazakhstan will allow investors to reach neighboring markets, such as Russia and China. Idrissov also said that Kazakhstan seeks to expand its presence in Latin America and considers Mexico as a strategic ally in building these relations, while Kazakhstan can offer the same support to Mexico in the Eurasian region.

| Country | Formal Relations Began | Notes |
|---|---|---|
| Brazil | 22 September 1993 | See Brazil–Kazakhstan relations: Brazil has an embassy in Astana.; Kazakhstan has an embassy in Brasília. |
| Canada | | See Canada–Kazakhstan relations The countries established diplomatic relations with each other in 1992. Both countries are full members of the Organization for Security and Co-operation in Europe. The President of Kazakhstan, Nursultan Nazarbayev, made an official visit to Canada in May 2003.: Canada has an embassy in Astana.; Kazakhstan has an embassy in Ottawa and a consulate in Toronto. |
| Cuba | 24 March 1992 | Cuba has an embassy in Astana.; Kazakhstan has an embassy in Havana. |
| Chile | | Kazakhstan and Chile signed an agreement on mining and energy as well as citizens can visit visa free; Chile is accredited to Kazakhstan from its embassy in Moscow, Russia.; Kazakhstan is accredited to Chile from its embassy in Brasilia, Brazil. |
| Mexico | 14 January 1992 | See Kazakhstan–Mexico relations: Kazakhstan has an embassy in Mexico City.; Mexico is accredited to Kazakhstan from its embassy in Ankara, Turkey and maintains an honorary consulate in Almaty. |
| United States | 16 December 1991 | See Kazakhstan–United States relations: Former Vice President Dick Cheney visited Kazakhstan on 5 May 2006. The bedrock of U.S. – Kazakhstan cooperation is on nuclear nonproliferation and security.; The United States and Kazakhstan have a platform for bilateral communication called the U.S.-Kazakhstan Strategic Partnership Dialogue.: Kazakhstan has an embassy in Washington, D.C. and has consulates-general in New York City and in San Francisco.; United States has an embassy in Astana and a consulate-general in Almaty. |
| Venezuela | 24 March 1992 | Kazakhstan does not have an accreditation to Venezuela.; Venezuela has an embassy in Astana. |

=== Asia ===
| Country | Formal relations began | Notes |
|---|---|---|
| Afghanistan | February 1992 | See Afghanistan–Kazakhstan relations: Afghanistan has an embassy in Astana.; Kazakhstan has an embassy in Kabul. |
| Armenia | | See Armenia–Kazakhstan relations: Since 1992, Armenia has had an embassy in Astana.; Kazakhstan has an embassy in Yerevan.; Both countries are full members of the Collective Security Treaty Organisation, of the Organization for Security and Co-operation in Europe and of the Commonwealth of Independent States.; There are 25,000 people of Armenian descent living in Kazakhstan.; Between 1 and 2 September 1999, Armenian president Robert Kocharyan made an official visit to Kazakhstan.; In May 2001, Kazakh president Nursultan Nazarbayev made an official visit to Armenia.; Kazakh Ministry of Foreign Affairs about relations with Armenia |
| Azerbaijan | 27 August 1992 | See Azerbaijan–Kazakhstan relations: Azerbaijan has an embassy in Astana.; Kazakhstan has had an embassy in Baku.; Both countries are full members of the Turkic Council, the International Organization of Turkic Culture, and Organization for Security and Co-operation in Europe.; There are over 85,000 people of Azerbaijani descent living in Kazakhstan. See Azerbaijanis in Kazakhstan. |
| Bahrain | | President Nursultan Nazarbayev welcomed Sheikh Hamad Bin Isa Al-Khalifa, King of the Kingdom of Bahrain, on his first ever trip and the first by an Arab leader to the Republic. He has stressed Bahrain as a key partner in the Arab world at a press conference and has ensured that this visit has led to a new page in the relations between bonding the two nations The Kazakh Government has created the Bahraini-Kazakh Business Council, unveiling plans to sign an agreement on encouraging and protecting investment, avoiding taxation and fiscal evasion. |
| Bangladesh | | See Bangladesh–Kazakhstan relations Both Bangladesh and Kazakhstan are keen to expand the bilateral trade and have been undertaking various measures in this regard. Bangladeshi products including jute, jute goods, tea, medicine and garments have been identified as products with high potential in Kazakhstani market. In 2008, the two countries formed joint economic commission to increase the economic activities between the two countries. In 2012, Bangladesh was granted duty-free access to Kazakhstan's market. In 2013, a high level business delegation from Bangladesh, led by former commerce secretary Mahbub Ahmed, paid a visit to Kazakhstan to explore ways for increasing bilateral trade. |
| China | 1992-01-03 | See China–Kazakhstan relations: The two nations signed their first boundary agreement in April 1994, and their second supplementary boundary agreement in July 1998 to mark their 1,700 km shared border. |
| Georgia | 24 July 1992 | Georgia has an embassy in Astana and an honorary consulate in Almaty.; Kazakhstan has an embassy in Tbilisi.; Both countries are full members of the Organization for Security and Co-operation in Europe.; Georgian Ministry of Foreign Affairs about the relation with Kazakhstan; Kazakh Ministry of Foreign Affairs about the relation with Georgia |
| India | | See India–Kazakhstan relations |
| Indonesia | 2 June 1993 | See Indonesia–Kazakhstan relations: Indonesia has an embassy in Astana.; Kazakhstan has an embassy in Jakarta.; Both nations are member of Organisation of Islamic Cooperation. |
| Iran | | See Iran–Kazakhstan relations: Iran has an embassy in Astana and consulates-general in Aktau and Almaty.; Kazakhstan has an embassy in Tehran and consulates-general in Bandar Abbas and Gorgan. |
| Israel | | See Israel–Kazakhstan relations Notwithstanding its membership in the Organisation of Islamic Cooperation, Kazakhstan has good relations with Israel. Diplomatic relations were established in 1992 and President Nazarbayev paid official visits to Israel in 1995 and 2000. In 2006, during a state visit by Kazakh Deputy Prime Minister Karim Masimov, Israeli Prime Minister Ehud Olmert remarked, "Kazakhstan can show a beautiful face of Islam ... Contemporary, ever-developing Kazakhstan is a perfect example of both economic development and interethnic accord that should be followed by more Muslim states." Bilateral trade between the two countries amounted to $364m in exports to Israel, mostly crude oil, and $118M in imports. |
| Kyrgyzstan | | See Kazakhstan–Kyrgyzstan relations Bilateral relationships between the countries are very strong and Kyrgyz and Kazakh are very close in terms of language, culture and religion. Kyrgyz-Kazakh relationships have always been at a very high level and economic and other formal unification of two countries have been greeted with strong appreciation by both nations since the two share a lot in common. On 26 April 2007, the presidents of Kazakhstan and Kyrgyzstan signed an agreement to create an "International Supreme Council" between the two states. This historic event took place during an official visit of the Kazakh president to the Kyrgyzstan capital, Bishkek. |
| Malaysia | 16 March 1992 | See Kazakhstan–Malaysia relations Kazakhstan has an embassy in Kuala Lumpur while Malaysia has an embassy in Almaty. Both are members of Organisation of Islamic Cooperation (OIC). |
| Pakistan | | See Kazakhstan–Pakistan relations Relations between the two countries began when Pakistan recognized Kazakhstan on 20 December 1991. On 24 February 1992, diplomatic and consular relations were established during an official visit by Kazakhstani president Nursultan Nazarbayev to Pakistan. Kazakhstan is an emerging market for Pakistani goods. |
| Philippines | 1992-03-19 | Diplomatic relations between the Kazakhstan and the Philippines were formally established on 19 March 1992. The Philippines maintains relations with Kazakhstan through its embassy in Moscow in Russia. Kazakhstan has an honorary consulate in Manila. Trade between Kazakhstan and the Philippines amounted to 7.3 million during January to November 2010. In 2009, about 1,500 Kazakh tourists visited the Philippines. As of 2009, there are about 7,000 Overseas Filipino Workers are working in Western Kazakhstan, mostly in the oil and gas sector. Kazakhstan is attracting Philippine companies to invest in the country. On 2011, Kazakhstan is planning to put up a Kazakhstan house in the Philippines either in the Bonifacio Global City or Makati to showcase Kazakh products and promote its tourist destinations. There is also plans to put up a Philippine House in Kazakhstan for the same purpose and there is also plans to put Filipino art exhibits in Kazakhstan Kazakh President Nursultan Nazarbayev, and his 27 delegates arrived in the Philippines for a three-day state visit on 10 November 2003, at the Villamor Airbase in Pasay. The Kazakh officials met with their Filipino counterparts and conducted meetings. Former Philippine President Gloria Macapagal Arroyo met with Nazarbayev to finalize the Philippine's intent to import oil and coal from Kazakhstan and discussed possible infrastructure projects in the Central Asian country. The Philippines also supported Kazakhstan bid to become a member of the ASEAN Regional Forum on security. |
| Qatar | 1 July 1993 | See Kazakhstan–Qatar relations |
| South Korea | 28 January 1992 | See Kazakhstan–South Korea relations: The establishment of diplomatic relations between South Korea and Kazakhstan began on 28 January 1992.; The South Korea has an embassy in Astana.; The Kazakhstan of has an embassy in Seoul.; Number of the South Korean living in Kazakhstan as of in 2013 is about 2,500.; Bilateral Trade in 2013 about US$1,323 million; Exports 1,074million US dollars; Imports 249 million US dollars; South Korea's Investment in Kazakhstan of in 2013 about US$3,246 million (Largest Investment in Asia); Bilateral relations have grown steadily since that time. Cooperation between the two nations has grown in political, economic, and educational spheres. The presence of 100,000 ethnic Koreans living in Kazakhstan (known as Koryo-saram) creates an additional link between the two countries. |
| Syria | | Kazakhstan sent its next humanitarian aid to Syria in January 2017. The 500 tonnes of supply of food and medications were delivered to Tartus Port on the Mediterranean coast of Syria. |
| Tajikistan | 7 January 1993 | See Kazakhstan–Tajikistan relations: Kazakhstan has an embassy in Dushanbe and a consulate in Khujand.; Tajikistan has an embassy in Astana and a consulate-general in Almaty. |
| Turkey | 2 March 1992 | See Kazakhstan–Turkey relations: Kazakhstan has an embassy in Ankara and an consulates-general in Antalya and Istanbul.; Turkey has an embassy in Astana and an consulates-general in Aktau, Almaty and in Turkistan.; Both countries are members of Asia Cooperation Dialogue, Economic Cooperation Organization, International Organization of Turkic Culture, OIC, TAKM, Turkic Council, TURKPA, OSCE and WTO.; Trade volume between the two countries was US$3.9 billion in 2019 (Kazakh exports/imports: 3/0.9 billion USD).; Yunus Emre Institute has a local headquarters in Astana. |
| Turkmenistan | | See Kazakhstan–Turkmenistan relations: Kazakhstan has an embassy in Ashgabat.; Turkmenistan has an embassy in Astana.; During a meeting in October 2023, Kazakhstan and Turkmenistan released a statement affirming their strategic partnership and cooperation. Kazakh Deputy Prime Minister and Foreign Minister Murat Nurtleu and Turkmen Deputy Prime Minister and Foreign Minister Rashid Meredov issued the statement during a meeting in Ashgabat on 30 October 2023. |
| Uzbekistan | | See Kazakhstan–Uzbekistan relations: Kazakhstan–Uzbekistan relations have always been sincere and strong. Since the rapid development of Kazakhstan the president of Uzbekistan Mr. Karimov has visited Kazakhstan several times. |

=== Europe ===
==== European Union ====
The Partnership and Cooperation Agreement (PCA) with Kazakhstan has been the legal framework for European Union-Kazakhstan bilateral relations since it entered into force in 1999. In November 2006 a Memorandum of Understanding on cooperation in the field of energy between the EU and Kazakhstan has been signed establishing the basis for enhanced cooperation.

The future European Commission assistance will focus on the following priority areas: promotion of the ongoing reform process at political, economic, judiciary and social level, infrastructure building, and cooperation in the energy sector.

The overall EU co-operation objectives, policy responses and priority fields for Central Asia can be found in the EC Regional Strategy Paper for Central Asia 2007–2013. In addition to the assistance under the Development Cooperation Instrument (DCI), Kazakhstan participates in several ongoing regional programs.

On 20 January 2015 Kazakhstan and the EU initialed the EU-Kazakhstan Enhanced Partnership and Cooperation Agreement. This agreement will greatly facilitate stronger political and economic relations between Kazakhstan and the EU. It will increase the flow of trade, services and investment between the parties and will contribute to Kazakhstan's political and social development.

Bilateral relations received a post-pandemic refocus with the EU visit by Kazakhstan's president in November 2021. The visit was the first to Europe by Tokayev since becoming president in 2019.

==== European countries ====
| Country | Formal Relations Began | Notes |
|---|---|---|
| Austria | | See Austria–Kazakhstan relations: Austria has an embassy in Astana.; Kazakhstan has an embassy in Vienna. |
| Belgium | | Belgium has an embassy in Astana.; Kazakhstan has an embassy in Brussels. |
| Bulgaria | 1992-07-05 | Since 1994, Bulgaria has had an embassy in Astana.; Since November 2004, Kazakhstan has had an embassy and an honorary consulate in Sofia. |
| Croatia | | See Croatia–Kazakhstan relations: Relations between two countries are very close. Kazakh President Nursultan Nazarbayev made a state visits to Croatia in 2001, 2006 and is expected to visit Croatia in summer of 2015.Croatian President Stjepan Mesić visited Kazakhstan several times. Croatian Foreign Minister Vesna Pusić visited Kazakhstan in 2014, while Prime Minister Zoran Milanović visited that country on 27 May 2015. |
| Denmark | 1992-05-06 | See Denmark–Kazakhstan relations |
| Finland | | See Finland–Kazakhstan relations: Finland has an embassy in Astana.; Kazakhstan has an embassy in Helsinki. |
| France | 25 January 1992 | See France–Kazakhstan relations: France has an embassy in Astana and a consulate-general in Almaty.; Kazakhstan has an embassy in Paris and a consulate-general in Strasbourg.; Kazakhstan and France formed bilateral relation in 1993 under President Mitterrand.; President Nazarbayev has visited the country ten times since its independence.; President Nicolas Sarkozy visited Kazakhstan in 2009.; The Franco-Kazakh relationship has become stronger from #Kazakhstan hosting the 2017 World Expo.; Kazakhstan and France implemented 11 technology projects focusing on aerospace.; President François Hollande visited Kazakhstan in December 2014. |
| Germany | | See Germany–Kazakhstan relations: Germany has an embassy in Astana and a consulate-general in Almaty.; Kazakhstan has an embassy in Berlin, an embassy branch office in Bonn and consulates-general in Frankfurt, Hannover and Munich. |
| Greece | 1 October 1992 | See Greece–Kazakhstan relations: Greece has an embassy in Astana.; Kazakhstan has an embassy in Athens. |
| Hungary | 1992-03-23 | See Hungary–Kazakhstan relations: Hungary opened an embassy in Astana in March 1992.; Kazakhstan opened an embassy in Budapest in September 1993.; Foreign Minister Erlan Idrisov made his first state visit to Hungary on 20 November 2013; Hungarian Foreign Minister Viktor Orbán has intensified the bilateral relationship with "progress of the brotherly people."; Kazakhstan Embassy in Hungary |
| Italy | | See Italy–Kazakhstan relations: Italy has an embassy in Astana.; Kazakhstan has an embassy in Rome. |
| Latvia | 1992-12-30 | Kazakhstan recognised Latvia's independence on 23 December 1991.; Latvia recognised the independence of Kazakhstan on 8 January 1992.; Kazakhstan is represented in Latvia through its embassy in Vilnius (Lithuania) and through an honorary consulate in Riga.; Latvia has an embassy in Astana and an honorary consulate in Almaty.; Latvian Ministry of Foreign Affairs about the relation with Kazakhstan |
| Lithuania | | See Kazakhstan–Lithuania relations: Kazakhstan has an embassy in Vilnius.; Lithuania has an embassy in Astana and an honorary consulate in Almaty.; Lithuanian Ministry of Foreign Affairs: list of bilateral treaties with Kazakhstan (in Lithuanian only); Foreign Minister Idrissov and Foreign Minister Linas Linkevicius signed an action plan for 2014–2015. |
| Monaco | | Kazakhstan and Monaco signed a tourism cooperation agreement on 27 September 2013; Kazakhstan and Monaco signed a trade and investment agreement worth $73 billion in 2013 |
| Netherlands | | See Kazakhstan–Netherlands relations: Kazakhstan has an embassy in The Hague.; Netherlands has an embassy in Astana. |
| Norway | | Kazakhstan has an embassy in Oslo.; President Nazarbayev visited Oslo for the first time in April 2001. |
| Poland | | See Kazakhstan–Poland relations: Kazakhstan has an embassy in Warsaw.; Poland has an embassy in Astana. |
| Romania | 1992-07-15 | Kazakhstan has an embassy in Bucharest and an honorary consulate in Cluj-Napoca.; Romania has an embassy in Astana.; There are around 20,000 Romanians living in Kazakhstan.; Kazakh Ministry of Foreign Affairs about the relations with Romania |
| Russia | | See Kazakhstan–Russia relations: Kazakhstan has an embassy in Moscow and consulates-general in Astrakhan, Kazan, Omsk, Saint Petersburg and in Yekaterinburg.; Russia has an embassy in Astana and consulates-general in Almaty, Oral and in Oskemen.; Diplomatic relations between Russia and Kazakhstan have fluctuated since the fall of the Soviet Union but both nations remain particularly strong partners in regional affairs and major supporters of the Collective Security Treaty Organization, the Shanghai Cooperation Organisation and Eurasian Economic Union. Kazakhstani-Russian relations have been strained at times by Astana's military and economic cooperation with the United States as well as negotiations over Russia's continued use of the Baikonur Cosmodrome, however the two nations retain high-level military and economic cooperation perhaps second among former Soviet states only to that between Russia and Belarus. Kazakhstan sells oil and gas to Russia at a significantly reduced rate and Russian businesses are heavily invested in Kazakhstan's economy. |
| Spain | 11 February 1992 | See Kazakhstan–Spain relations: Kazakhstan has an embassy in Madrid and a consulate in Barcelona.; Spain has an embassy in Astana. |
| Switzerland | | Rakhat Aliyev, the First Vice Foreign Minister of Kazakhstan met with Anton Tahlmann, the Vice Foreign Minister of Switzerland, in Bern, Switzerland from 13–14 November 2006. Tahlmann announced that the Swiss Federal Council is considering opening an embassy in Kazakhstan, saying, "Switzerland is interested in comprehensive development of relations with your country because of its dynamic development and the growing role in the region. In relation with this Bern regards an increase of its diplomatic presence in this country, an opening of the Swiss embassy in perspective." He confirmed his government's support for Kazakhstan's candidacy for the Chairmanship of the Organization for Security and Cooperation in Europe in 2009. The two ministers also discussed trade, migration, and the environment. |
| Ukraine | 1991 | See Kazakhstan–Ukraine relations: Kazakhstan has an embassy in Kyiv.; Ukraine has an embassy in Astana.; Kazakhstan provided Ukraine with humanitarian aid after the beginning of military conflict in southeast Ukraine in 2014. In October 2014, Kazakhstan donated $30,000 to the International Committee of the Red Cross's humanitarian effort in Ukraine. In January 2015 Kazakhstan sent $400,000 worth of aid to Ukraine's southeastern regions to help ease the humanitarian crisis. |
| United Kingdom | 19 February 1992 | See Kazakhstan–United Kingdom relations The UK established diplomatic relations with the United Kingdom on 19 January 1992.: Kazakhstan maintains an embassy in London.; The UK is accredited to Kazakhstan through its embassy in Astana.; Both countries share common membership of the OSCE, and the World Trade Organization. Bilaterally the two countries have a Development Partnership, a Double Taxation Convention, an Investment Agreement, and a Strategic Partnership and Cooperation Agreement. |

=== Oceania ===
| Country | Formal Relations Began | Notes |
|---|---|---|
| Australia | | Australia is accredited to Kazakhstan from its embassy in Moscow, Russia.; Kazakhstan is accredited to Australia from its embassy in Singapore. |

== NATO ==
Kazakhstan has been a member of NATO's Partnership for Peace since 27 May 1994. In October 2014 Kazakhstan and NATO marked 20 years of cooperation within the Partnership for Peace. To that end, from 6 to 10 October 2014 a NATO delegation visited Kazakhstan to take part in a series of public diplomacy events. Among meetings with Kazakhstan's officials, the delegates also visited the Nazarbayev and the Gumilyov Eurasian National universities in Astana, where they delivered lectures explaining NATO's engagement with partners in the Central Asian region and briefed audiences on the key outcomes of the recent NATO Wales Summit, with particular focus on NATO's partnership policy and Afghanistan.

A NATO delegation also plans to visit Astana in the first half of 2015 and hold a joint event with the Kazakh side in the second half of 2015. The future NATO-Kazakhstan joint activities will be held in the framework of the Partnership for Peace program, which centres on the development and exchange of experience for peacekeeping forces.

== Visa regimes ==
At the 27th meeting of the Foreign Investors' Council, President Nazarbayev announced visa-free entry for citizens of the United States, the Netherlands, UK, France, Germany, Italy, Malaysia, the UAE, South Korea, and Japan. Currently Kazakhstan and the United States issue 5-year visas to citizens of each other.

This will fulfill a goal of diversifying the economy while also helping the world become more acquainted with Kazakhstan's cultural patrimony. Since 2001 to 2012, Kazakhstan has doubled its tourism earnings. Experts expect that Kazakhstan will continue to benefit from tourism from the eased visa regime.

On 15 July 2014, Kazakhstan launched a pilot project of visa-free regime for 10 countries: UK, USA, Germany, France, Italy, the United Arab Emirates (UAE), Malaysia, the Netherlands, South Korea and Japan. Citizens of these countries can enter, exit and transit through Kazakhstan without a visa for visits of up to 15 calendar days at a time.

On 26 June 2015, Kazakhstan issued a resolution expanding the number of countries included in a trial visa-free regime and extended that regime until 31 December 2017. The list now includes 19 countries, including Australia, Belgium, Finland, France, Germany, Hungary, Italy, Japan, Malaysia, Monaco, Netherlands, Norway, Singapore, Spain, Sweden, Switzerland, the UAE, the U. K. and the U.S.

Starting from 1 January 2017, Kazakhstan introduced visa-free access for 20 developed countries. These countries include the OECD members, Malaysia, Monaco, the UAE and Singapore. On 8 August 2024, Congo-Brazaville and Kazakhstan signed a visa exemption cooperation agreement between Congo and Kazakhstan.

Countries whose citizens can visit Kazakhstan visa-free for up to 14 days

The updated list for 2023 includes 4 countries: China, India, Iran and, Hong Kong.

Countries whose citizens can visit Kazakhstan visa-free for up to 30 days

The updated list as of January 2023 includes 63 countries: Argentina, Australia, Austria, Bahrain, Belgium, Brazil, Bulgaria, Canada, Chile, Colombia, Croatia, Cyprus, Czech Republic, Denmark, Ecuador, Estonia, Finland, France, Germany, Greece, Hungary, Iceland, Indonesia, Ireland, Israel, Italy, Japan, Kuwait, Latvia, Liechtenstein, Lithuania, Luxembourg, Malaysia, Maldives, Malta, Mexico, Monaco, Netherlands, New Zealand, Nicaragua, Norway, Oman, Philippines, Poland, Portugal, Qatar, Romania, Saudi Arabia, Serbia, Singapore, Slovakia, Slovenia, South Korea, Spain, Sweden, Switzerland, Thailand, the United Kingdom, the United States, Turkiye, Vatican City, Vietnam, and the UAE.

== United Nations ==
Kazakhstan became a member of the United Nations on 2 March 1992, nearly three months after gaining independence.

During the General Assembly on 12 November 2012, Kazakhstan was elected to a seat on the United Nations Human Rights Council for the first time. Their seat is with the Asian Group and their term will expire in 2015.

At United Nations Day 2013, Foreign Minister Erlan Idrisov addressed the UN General Assembly saying the UN should develop a regional center in Almaty. Since the United Nations has no regional offices between Vienna and Bangkok, Almaty is home to 18 international organization's regional offices and would be vital to the development of Central Asia and its neighbors.

At the 68th Assembly of the United Nations, Foreign Minister Idrisov announced Kazakhstan's bid for a non-permanent seat on the United Nations Security Council for 2017–2018. So far they and Thailand have announced their bids.

In February 2015 the United Nations' specialized agency World Health Organization opened a new geographically dispersed office (GDO) for primary health care in Kazakhstan at the Kazakh National Medical University of S.Asfendiyarov in Almaty. According to the head the Kazakh Medical University, the GDO of the WHO's European Bureau in Almaty will be financed by the UN.

In July 2015 Kazakhstan was accepted to the Executive Council of the World Federation of UNESCO (WCF) Clubs at the ninth WCF World Congress, UNESCO Centres and Associations.

On 6 May 2016, Kazakh Foreign Minister Erlan Idrissov spoke at two high level meetings at the U.N. headquarters in New York. The Foreign Minister said that Kazakhstan was calling for a nuclear free world by 2045, the 100th anniversary of the United Nations.

Kazakhstan signed the Paris Climate Change Agreement on 2 Aug at UN Headquarters in New York. The Kazakh Senate ratified the Paris Agreement on 27 October 2016. Under the Paris Agreement, Kazakhstan has committed to cut its greenhouse gas emissions by 15-20% by 2030 up to the level observed in 1990.

In March 2017, Kazakhstan marked 25 years of its membership in the United Nations. To celebrate this anniversary, Kazakhstan opened the “Kazakhstan and the United Nations: Interaction for Peace” exhibition in the Museum of the Library of the First President of Kazakhstan. During 25 years of cooperation, the UN opened 15 representative offices in Kazakhstan, including the United Nations Development Programme (UNDP), the United Nations International Children's Emergency Fund (UNICEF), the United Nations Population Fund (UNFPA) and United Nations Educational, Scientific and Cultural Organisation (UNESCO), among others.

Astana is a host city of the Eighth International Forum on Energy for Sustainable Development that is planned to be held in June 2017. The Forum is co-organized through collaboration by Kazakhstan with the UN Regional Commissions, as well as UNDP, IEA, IAEA, IRENA, the World Bank, UNID, the Copenhagen Centre on Energy Efficiency, and the Renewable Energy Policy Network for the 21st Century.

=== United Nations Security Council ===
Kazakhstan, along with Sweden, Bolivia and Ethiopia, were elected to serve on Security Council for a two-year term, starting from 1 January 2017. Kazakhstan became the first Central Asian country to be elected as a non-permanent member of the UNSC. Kazakhstan assumed the chairmanship of UNSC on 1 January 2018. Kazakhstan focused on drawing attention on international community to the issues of Central Asia and Afghanistan.

Kazakhstan outlined priorities during its UNSC tenure. They included nuclear disarmament and non-proliferation, fight against terrorism and extremism, promotion of peacemaking and peace-building, as well as security and development issues in the Central Asian region.

President Nazarbayev's address to the UNSC was presented by the Foreign Minister of Kazakhstan at the ministerial-level open debate of the UNSC held on 10 January 2017. The address was based on the principles of the Kazakh President's earlier Manifesto “The World. The 21st Century.” It declares Kazakhstan's commitment to building a world free of nuclear weapons and to rid humanity of wars and conflicts.

President Nazarbayev chaired the 18 January UN Security Council briefing on WMD non-proliferation and related measures to better provide security for Central Asia. It was the first time a president of a Central Asian country chaired a UNSC briefing.

As a non-permanent member, Kazakhstan was actively involved in the Council’s deliberations and chaired three crucial Sanctions Committees related to ISIL (Da’esh) and Al-Qaida, the Taliban, and Somalia and Eritrea. Kazakhstan’s representatives were responsible for leading council meetings and overseeing crisis management during their presidency of the UNSC.

== Peacekeeping ==
The Kazakh Peacekeeping Battalion (KazBat) was established in 2000. KazBat's first mission was part of the peacekeeping operation Iraqi Freedom from 2003 to 2008. During this time, nine Kazakh peacekeeping contingents served in Iraq, engaging in demining, convoy safety, base protection, traffic regulation, and humanitarian aid. Kazakh servicemen destroyed about five million explosive ordnance and provided medical assistance to over 500 Iraqi citizens.

On 31 October 2018, Kazakhstan deployed 120 Kazakh peacekeepers to serve with the UN mission in furthering peace in south Lebanon. It was the first time Kazakh troops were serving with UNIFIL in the Mission's 40-year history. On 20 August 2020, Kazakhstan deployed a second group of 60 peacekeepers to the UNIFIL.

Kazakhstan has regularly conducted joint anti-terrorism and peacekeeping exercises, “Steppe Eagle,” since 2003, with the participation of NATO forces. Additionally, the Partnership for Peace Training Center (KAZCENT), operational since 2008, trains peacekeepers and offers courses certified by the United Nations, such as “Protection of Civilians” and “UN Staff Officers”.

== Shanghai Cooperation Organisation ==
Kazakhstan is one of the original founding members of the Shanghai Cooperation Organisation, known as the Shanghai Five. They formally began the organization on 26 April 1996, with the signing of the Treaty on Deepening Military Trust in Border Regions in Shanghai. Since then, Kazakhstan has become a very active member in global politics within the organization.

At the SCO Summit in Bishkek, Kyrygyzstan on 20 September 2013, Kazakhstan met with leaders to discuss many issues. One of the main issues discussed was the focus on regional stability for Afghanistan after the United States withdraws its troops. Kazakhstan also signed the Bishkek Declaration along with members and observers to find diplomatic solutions for Iran and Syria. On Syria, Kazakhstan wanted to help find a diplomatic solution that would not involve direct intervention due to the need of UN authorization. On Iran, Kazakhstan wanted to see a diplomatic solution between Iran and the P5+1 group for Iran to enrich uranium at levels for energy consumption.

In November 2016, Kazakhstan chaired first ever SCO human rights consultations. The meetings were held in Beijing and aimed at further consolidation of the SCO member states cooperation in human rights.

Astana hosted the 17th Shanghai Cooperation Organisation (SCO) summit. The summit featured the ceremony of accession of India and Pakistan to the organization. Therefore, the total number of member states increased to eight: China, Kazakhstan, Kyrgyz Republic, Russia, Tajikistan, Uzbekistan, India, and Pakistan.

Kazakhstan assumed the rotational chairmanship of the Shanghai Cooperation Organization from July 2023 to July 2024.

== Other international organizations ==
=== Antarctic treaty ===
Kazakhstan joined the Antarctic Treaty in November 2014 being the 51st country to ratify it.

Kazakhstan had shown an interest in the Antarctic before, with officials even identifying it as a potential source of drinking water for the arid steppe nation. The country staged its first expedition to the South Pole in 2011.

=== Organisation for Economic Co-operation and Development (OECD) ===
On 23 January in Davos at the World Economic Forum, Prime Minister of Kazakhstan Karim Massimov and Secretary General of the Organisation for Economic Co-operation and Development (OECD) Angel Gurria signed a Memorandum of Understanding between Kazakhstan and the OECD on the implementation of the Country Program of Cooperation for 2015–2016.

In July 2016, it was announced that Kazakhstan was admitted to the OECD Competition Committee that aims to promote antitrust reforms. Kazakhstan is the first Central Asian country to join the committee.

Kazakhstan joined the Declaration on International Investment and Multinational Enterprises of the OECD and became an associated participant of the OECD Investment Committee in June 2017. OECD Investment Committee is the leading government forum for cooperation on international investment issues.

=== World Trade Organization ===
Kazakhstan applied for WTO accession on 29 January 1996. The accession negotiations between Kazakhstan and the WTO lasted 20 years and on 30 November 2015, the organization welcomed Kazakhstan as its 162nd Member.

In April 2017, the General Council of the WTO announced that Kazakhstan's Ambassador to Switzerland and Permanent Representative of the Republic of Kazakhstan to the UN structures Zhanar Aitzhanova would be the Chairperson of the WTO Committee for Trade and Environment in 2017.

== World Anti-Crisis Conference ==
The 21st World Anti Crisis Conference was conducted with the support of the UN General Assembly Resolution A/RES/67/19International financial sistem and development from 21 December 2012, on 23 May 2013, within the framework of the VI Astana Economic Forum. Main outcome of the WAC I was the Astana Declaration and the guidelines of the World Anti-Crisis Plan developed using the contributions from the international expert community, the UN member states and the UN Secretariat.

The concept of the WAC Plan, based on democratic principles and the interests of all UN member states aims at developing effective measures to overcome the economic and financial crisis, preventing future recessions and ensuring long-term balanced growth of the global economy.

== See also ==
- Kazakhstan–European Union relations
- List of diplomatic missions in Kazakhstan
- List of diplomatic missions of Kazakhstan
- Terrorism in Kazakhstan
