= List of ambassadors of Israel to Kazakhstan =

This is a list of Israel's ambassadors to Kazakhstan. The current ambassador is Liat Wexelman, who has held the position since 2018.

== List of ambassadors ==
- Edwin Nathan Yabo Glusman 2022 -
- Liat Wexelman 2018 - 2022
- Michael Brodsky 2015 - 2018
- Eliyaho Tasman 2012 - 2015
- Israel Mey Ami 2008 - 2012
- Ran Ichay 2006 - 2008
- Michael Lotem 2004 - 2006
- Moshe Kimhi 2002 - 2004
- Israel Mey Ami 1996 - 2002
- Ambassador Bentsion Karmel 1993 - 1996
- Chargé d'Affaires a.i. Arkady Milman 1992 - 1993
