= Denmark–Kazakhstan relations =

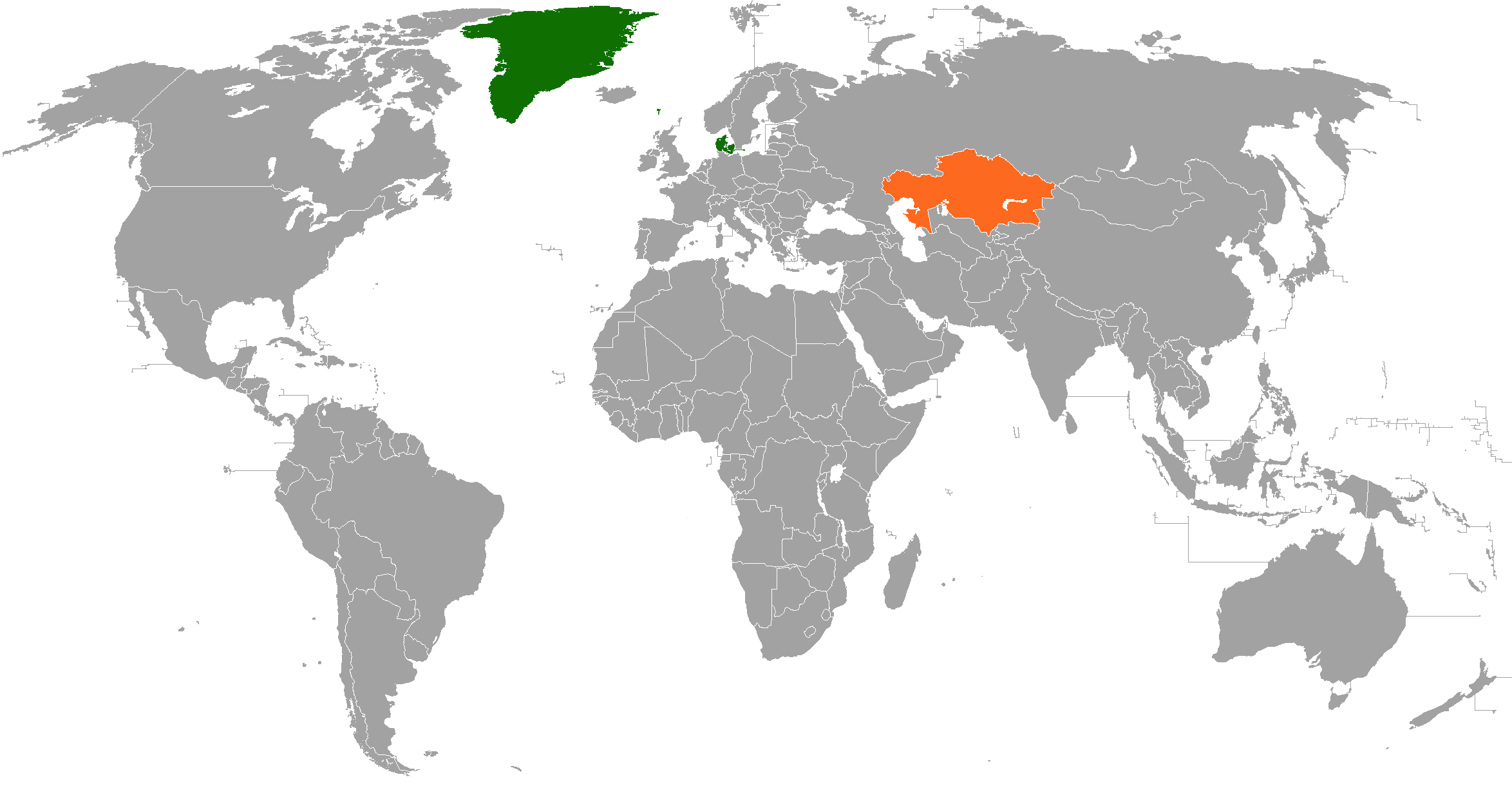

- Denmark: Kazakhstan

Denmark–Kazakhstan relations refers to the current and historical relations between Denmark and Kazakhstan. Denmark recognized Kazakhstan on December 31, 1991 and diplomatic relations were established on May 6, 1992. Neither country has a resident ambassador. Kazakhstan's ambassador to the United Kingdom is accredited to Denmark. Denmark opened a trade mission in Almaty in 2005.

== High level visits ==
In 2000, an important boost to the development of bilateral relations was provided by an official visit to Denmark from President Nursultan Nazarbayev where he met with Queen Margrethe II and with Prime-Minister Poul Nyrup Rasmussen. On 9 June 2010, Kazakhstan's Secretary of State and Foreign Minister Kanat Saudabayev visited Denmark to talk with the Danish Deputy Prime Minister and Minister of Foreign Affairs Lene Espersen.

== Economic relations ==
From 1993 to 2003, Denmark invested approximately $1.7 million in the Kazakhstan's economy. Denmark's export to Kazakhstan between 2004 and 2008 rose from 253 million to 488 million DKK. In 2009 it decreased to 297 million DKK. Danish imports in 2009 totaled 247 million DKK. Kazakhstan exports mineral products, production of chemical industry, cars, and production of food industry to Denmark.

In 2007, FLSmidth signed a contract with about 670 million DKK for the supply of a cement plant in Kokshetau, which is partly owned by the Kazakh company East Energy Company. There are a number of Danish companies operating in Kazakhstan, primarily in the fields of energy, pharmaceuticals and manufacturing.

In 1994, an international delegation, including Danes, visited the Aral Sea in Kazakhstan, and in 1995 Aral fishery community leaders visit Denmark and signed a protocol of common aims.

Danish company Maersk Oil owns 60% of shares in the Dunga field and owned a 60% share in the Saigak field (which it sold in 2010). The oil production was 9,000 barrels per day in 2009.

Baltic Beverages Holding bought in 2002, 76% interest in the Kazakh brewery Irbis, and 45 million euros have been invested. 800,000 hectolitres of beer have been produced.

== Resident diplomatic missions ==
- Denmark is accredited to Kazakhstan from its embassy in Moscow, Russia.
- Kazakhstan is accredited to Denmark from its embassy in Stockholm, Sweden.

== See also ==
- Foreign relations of Denmark
- Foreign relations of Kazakhstan
