= Indonesia–Kazakhstan relations =

- Indonesia: Kazakhstan

Indonesia–Kazakhstan relations refer to bilateral relations between Indonesia and Kazakhstan. The two countries officially established relations in 1993 and share some similarities; both countries possess abundance of natural resources, have predominantly Muslim populations with significant Christian minorities, ensure harmonious diversity and a commitment to human rights and democracy. Both nations have agreed to increase cooperation in several economic sectors, such as agriculture, industry, pharmaceuticals, petroleum, transportation infrastructure and machinery manufacture. Indonesia has an embassy in Astana, while Kazakhstan has an embassy in Jakarta. Both nations are members of the Asia Cooperation Dialogue, Organisation of Islamic Cooperation and the United Nations.

== History ==
The relations started with Indonesia's recognition of the proclamation of independence of the Republic of Kazakhstan on 28 December 1991. On 2 June 1993, Indonesia and Kazakhstan officially established diplomatic relations. However, it was not until 29 December 2010 that Indonesia opened their embassy in Astana Kazakhstan reciprocated on 13 April 2012 by the opening of the Kazakh embassy in Jakarta.

== High level visits ==
Indonesian President Suharto paid a state visit to Almaty in April 1995, which was reciprocated by a state visit from President Nursultan Nazarbayev to Jakarta just over three months later. President Nazarbayev paid a state visit to Jakarta from 12 to 14 April 2012. Indonesian President Susilo Bambang Yudhoyono reciprocated with a visit to Astana on 2 September 2013. On June 29, 2026, Vice Minister of Foreign Affairs of Indonesia Anis Matta visited Astana and met with Kazakh Foreign Minister Yermek Kosherbayev. During the meeting, they discussed ways to increase economic ties and people to people ties between Indonesia and Kazakhstan, including through tourism. This is part of Kazakhstan's broader ambitions to become more deeply integrated into the Asia-Pacific region.

== Trade and investment ==
According to Indonesian Ministry of Trade, the bilateral trade between Indonesia and Kazakhstan in 2012 reached US$63,156 million, a 90,5% increase compared to 2011 figure of US$33,153 million. The trade balance in 2012 was in favor to Kazakhstan that recorded US$46 million surplus over Indonesia. The two countries will boost investment and trade, specifically in the wheat, cotton and rubber industries, as well as in the production and exploration of oil. One of which, a joint venture to produce tires in Kazakhstan with a value of investment of US$100 million. There is also a plan to build an Indonesian instant noodle factory in Kazakhstan, since Indonesia is one of the world's largest producers and consumers of instant noodles and experienced in this industry, while Kazakhstan is one of the largest wheat producers in the region, which will render the supply and production process more cheap and practical. This is an opportunity for Indonesian instant noodle brands to penetrate Central Asian, Russian, and even European markets. This practice has been done by Indonesian instant noodle brand Indomie that invested in Nigeria.

== See also ==
- Foreign relations of Indonesia
- Foreign relations of Kazakhstan
