= Kazakhstan–Malaysia relations =

- Kazakhstan: Malaysia

Envoy
- Ambassador Bulat Sugurbayev: Ambassador Mohammed Adli bin Abdullah

Kazakhstan–Malaysia relations refers to foreign relations between Kazakhstan and Malaysia. Kazakhstan has an embassy in Kuala Lumpur, and Malaysia has an embassy in Astana.

== History ==
Diplomatic relations between both countries were established on 16 March 1992. In 1996, Kazakhstan opened an embassy in Kuala Lumpur, and Malaysia opened an embassy in Astana

== State visits ==
In May 1996, the President of Kazakhstan Nursultan Nazarbayev has made the first official visit to Malaysia while in the same year in July, the Malaysian Prime Minister Mahathir Mohamad reciprocated with the official visit to Kazakhstan.

== Economic relations ==
Both Kazakhstan and Malaysia are on the way to expand trade and economic co-operation. A number of documents also signed by both sides to forge closer ties between them. In 2011, the total trade between the two countries was valued at US$61.1 million. Both countries also work together in the technology exchange, Islamic financing and in a joint venture on the halal sector. At least 15,000 Kazakhs have visited Malaysia in 2011 since a direct flights been introduced by Air Astana between Almaty and Kuala Lumpur. In 2016, the total trade reach US$49.22 million with Malaysia's largest export to Kazakhstan is coffee-based preparations while the biggest imports from Kazakhstan were zinc and television components. On 4 May 2017, both countries agreed on 11 areas of economic co-operation.

== Resident diplomatic missions ==
- Kazakhstan has an embassy in Kuala Lumpur.
- Malaysia has an embassy in Astana.

== See also ==
- Foreign relations of Kazakhstan
- Foreign relations of Malaysia
