= Italy–Kazakhstan relations =

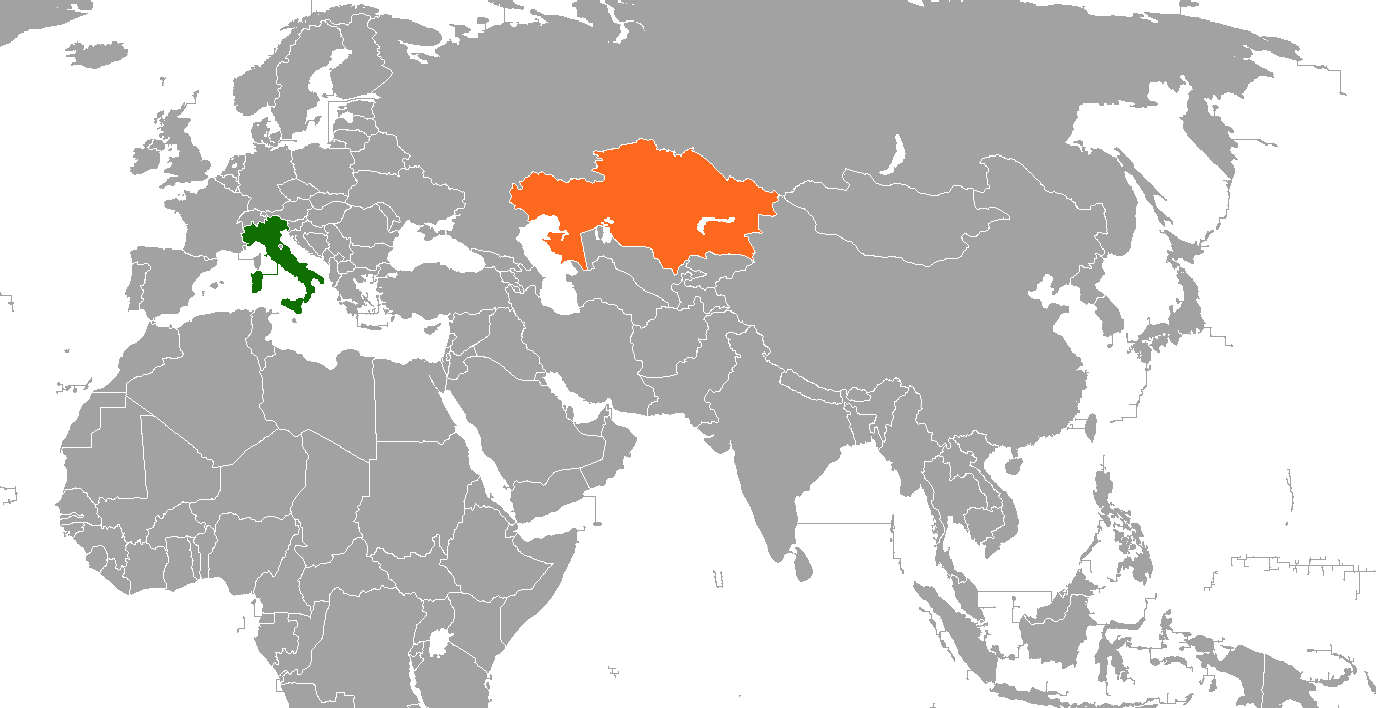

- Italy: Kazakhstan

Italy–Kazakhstan relations are the bilateral relations between Italy and Kazakhstan. Italy has an embassy in Astana. Kazakhstan has an embassy in Rome.

== Economic relations ==
More than 12% of Kazakhstan exports in 2019 (approx. $7.25 billion) went to Italy - second only to China, and most of any other country in Europe, including Russia, which shares a border with Kazakhstan. The Italian state oil company owns a 16.8% stake in the Kashagan oil field in Kazakhstan's Caspian Sea basin, and a 29.25% stake in the Karachaganak gas field with the Kazakhstan state oil company KazMunayGas.

== See also ==
- Foreign relations of Italy
- Foreign relations of Kazakhstan
