= Hungary–Kazakhstan relations =

Hungarian-Kazakhstan bilateral relations

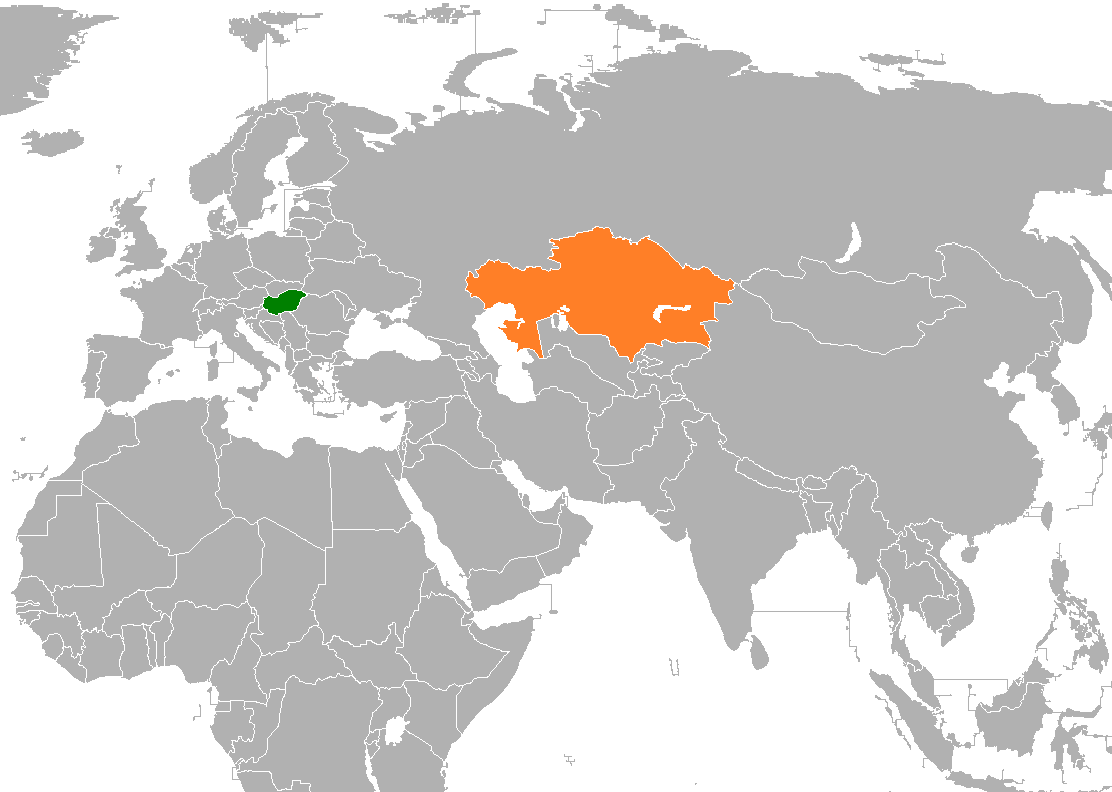

- Hungary: Kazakhstan

Hungary–Kazakhstan relations are the bilateral relations between Hungary and Kazakhstan. Hungary has an embassy in Astana. Kazakhstan has an embassy in Budapest. Diplomatic relations between the countries were established on 2 April 1992. Kazakhstan regards Hungary as a key trade and economic partner in Central and Eastern Europe. The countries emphasise shared cultural values, linguistic ties and “millennia-old common roots“ as a basis for their close cooperation.

== History ==
Hungary recognized the independence of Kazakhstan in 1992.

Kazakhstan opened its first consulate in Karcag in 1998 February. The town is important because it is the center of the region where most descendants of Kuns live, an ethnic group with the closest ties to the Kazakh Kipchaks. The consulate promotes the interest of Kazakhstan, provides administrative services to Kazakh citizens, and cooperates with both the Kazakh embassy and the town of Karcag.

== High-level visits ==
- February 2015 - Hungarian Foreign Minister Péter Szijjártó met with Kazakh Prime Minister Karim Maszimov
- March–April 2015 - Hungarian Prime Minister Viktor Orbán visited Kazakhstan along with several high-ranking ministers and government officials and met with President Nursultan Nazarbayev, and Prime Minister Karim Maszimov
- April 2016 - Zsolt Csutora, Deputy Assistant Secretary of State responsible for the Eastern opening visited Astana
- October 2016 - Minister of Finance Mihály Varga along with a large official delegation and 30 representatives of Hungarian companies visited a business forum in Astana

== See also ==
- Foreign relations of Hungary
- Foreign relations of Kazakhstan
