= Brazil–Kazakhstan relations =

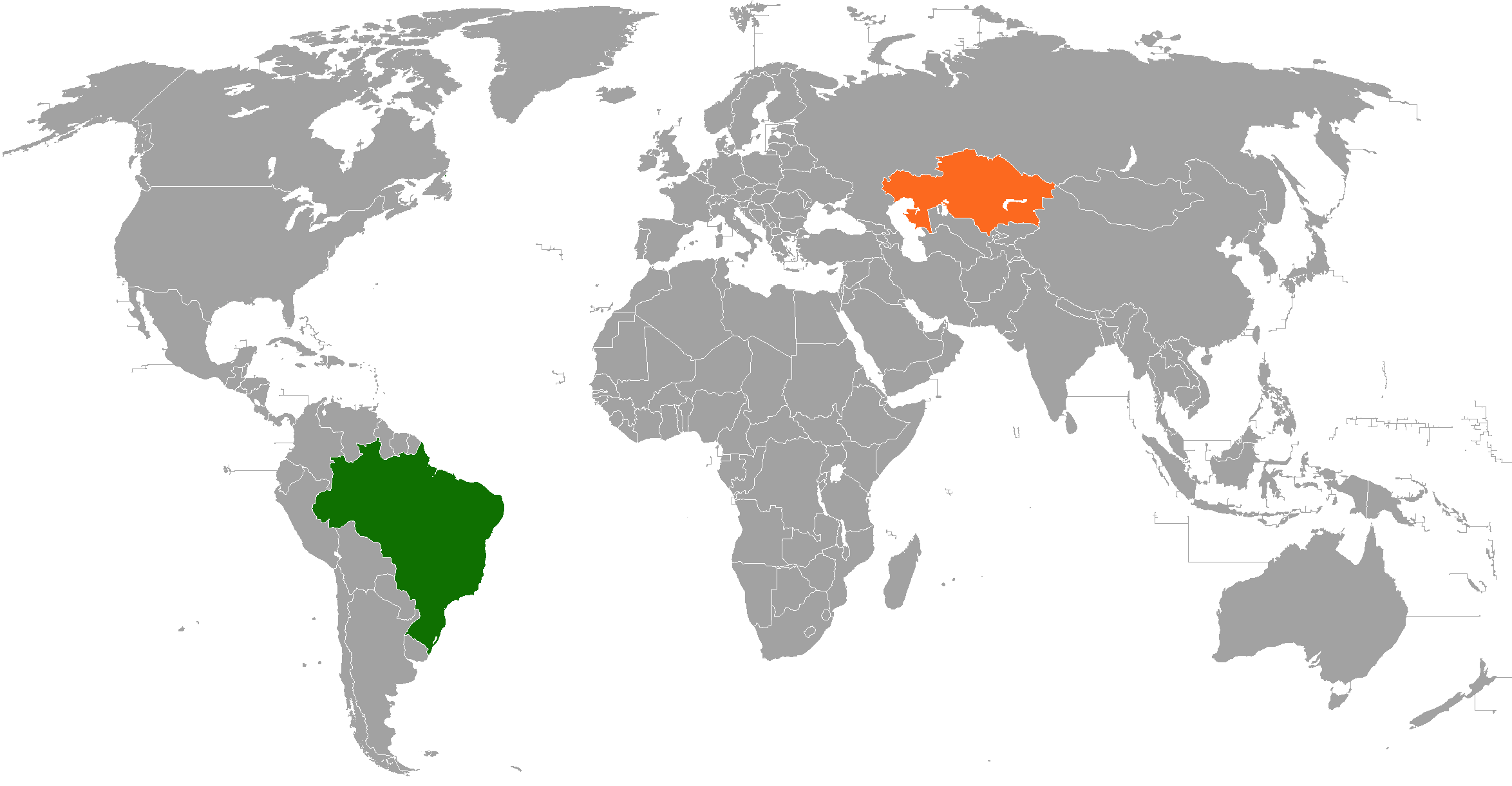

- Brazil: Kazakhstan

Brazil–Kazakhstan relations are the current and historical relations between the Federative Republic of Brazil and the Republic of Kazakhstan. Both nations are members of the United Nations.

== History ==
Soon after the dissolution of the Soviet Union, Brazil recognized Kazakhstan's independence on 26 December 1991. Diplomatic relations between both nations were established on 22 September 1993. Initially, there had been little diplomatic contact between both nations, with representatives of both nations meeting only at international forums such as at the United Nations.

In August 2006, Brazil opened an embassy in Astana. In 2007, Kazakh President Nursultan Nazarbayev paid an official visit to Brazil. The visit was reciprocated with the arrival of Brazilian President Luiz Inácio Lula da Silva to Kazakhstan in 2009. In October 2012, Kazakhstan opened a resident embassy in Brasília.

Brazil and Kazakhstan share similar positions in global issues, such as issues relating to sustainable development and preservation of the environment. Brazil supported Kazakhstan's entry into the World Trade Organization and received Kazakh support for its claim to obtain a permanent seat on the United Nations Security Council.

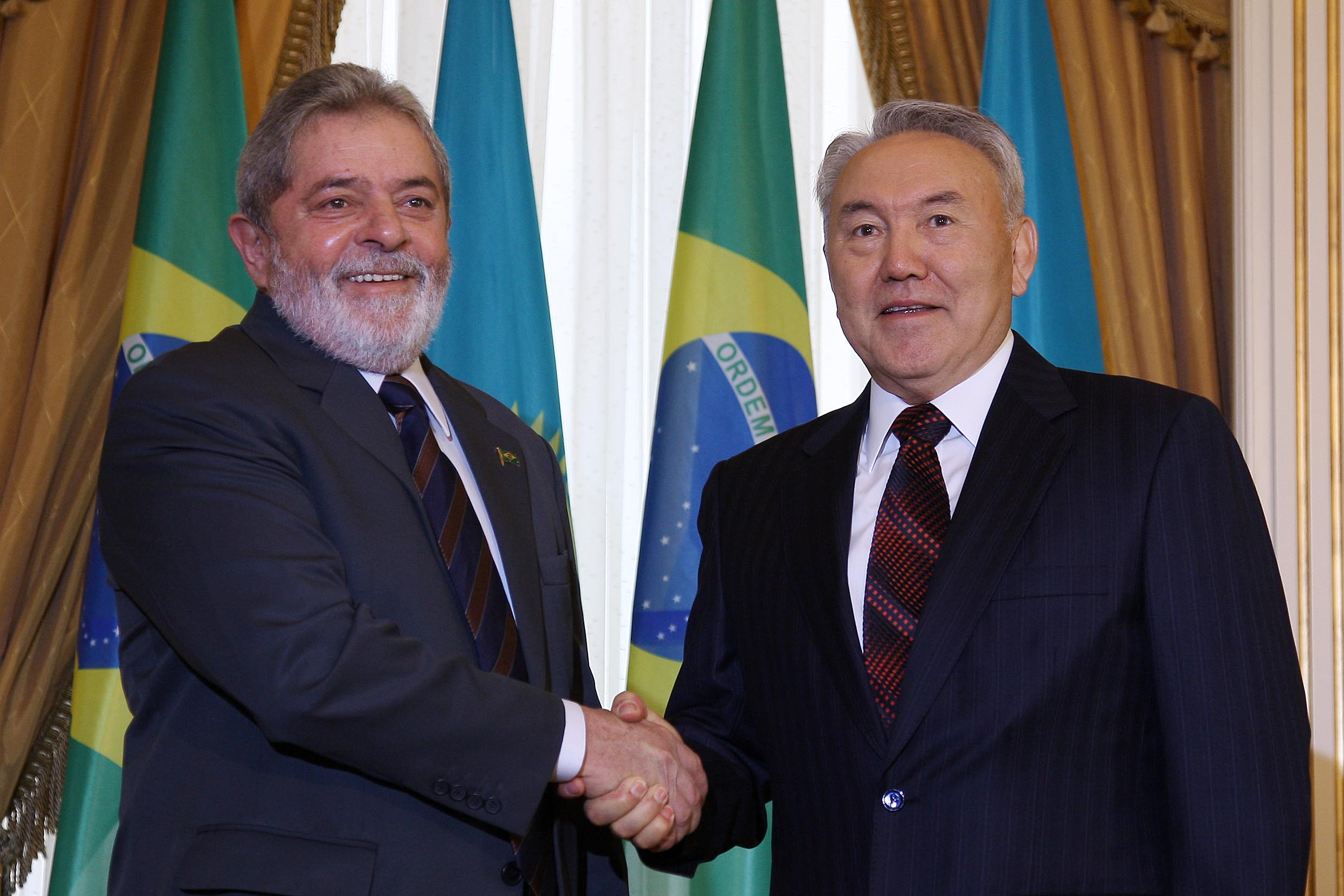
Brazilian President Luiz Inácio Lula da Silva and Kazakh President Nursultan Nazarbayev in Astana; 2009.

== High-level visits ==
High-level visits from Brazil to Kazakhstan

- President Luiz Inácio Lula da Silva (2009)
- Foreign Minister Aloysio Nunes (2018)

High-level visits from Kazakhstan to Brazil

- President Nursultan Nazarbayev (2007)
- Foreign Minister Erlan Idrissov (2013)

== Economic relations ==
There are a few Brazilian companies operating in Kazakhstan, and a few other Brazilian companies are looking to create a presence in the country for production and export to the markets of member nations of the Commonwealth of Independent States. The main Kazakh airline, Air Astana, owns and operates more than ten Brazilian made Embraer aircraft.

== Bilateral agreements ==
Both nations signed a few bilateral agreements such as an agreement on extradition (2018); agreement on the transfer of convicted persons (2018); an agreement of mutual assistance in criminal cases (2018); and a treaty to establish cooperation mechanisms to expedite investigations and combat criminal activities (2025).

== Resident diplomatic missions ==
- Brazil has an embassy in Astana.
- Kazakhstan has an embassy in Brasília.

== See also ==
- Foreign relations of Brazil
- Foreign relations of Kazakhstan
