= Finland–Kazakhstan relations =

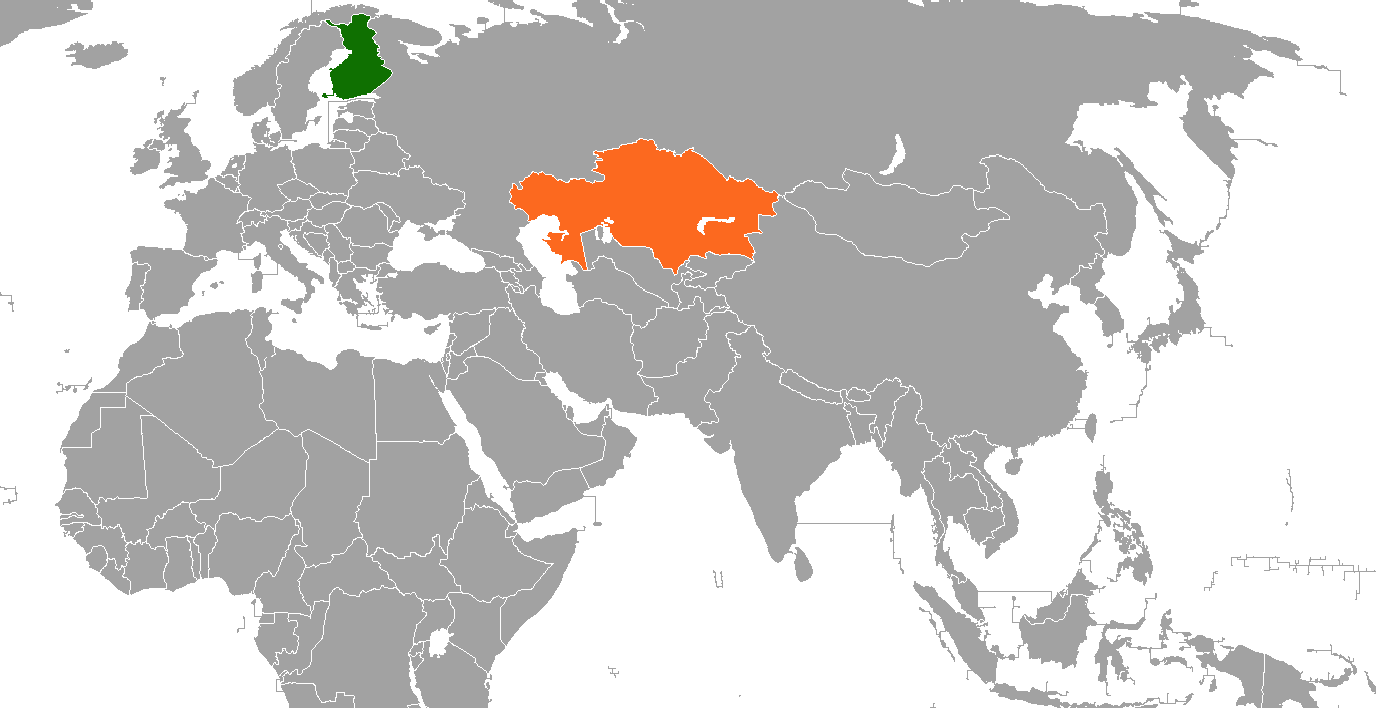

- Finland: Kazakhstan

Finland–Kazakhstan relations refers to the bilateral relations between Finland and Kazakhstan. Finland has an embassy in Astana whilst Kazakhstan has an embassy in Helsinki. Both countries are members of Organization for Security and Co-operation in Europe.

== History ==
Diplomatic relations were established on 13 May 1992 following Kazakhstan's independence from the former Soviet Union.

Embassies were established in Astana and Helsinki in 2009 and 2012 respectively. Finland advanced EU cooperation with Central Asia and Kazakhstan during its European Union presidential term in 2006, and promoted cooperative security, democracy, human rights and the rule of law in Central Asia while chair of the Organization for Security and Co-operation in Europe (OSCE) in 2008. Finland invited Kazakhstan to participate directly in the OSCE Environmental and Economic Committee and Kazakhstan continued many of Finland's OSCE policy priorities when it assumed chair of OSCE just two years later in 2010.

== Transport links ==
In 2017, Finnair commenced a seasonal service between Helsinki and Astana. The Finnish Ambassador said he hoped the new link would increase business between the two countries.

== Resident diplomatic missions ==
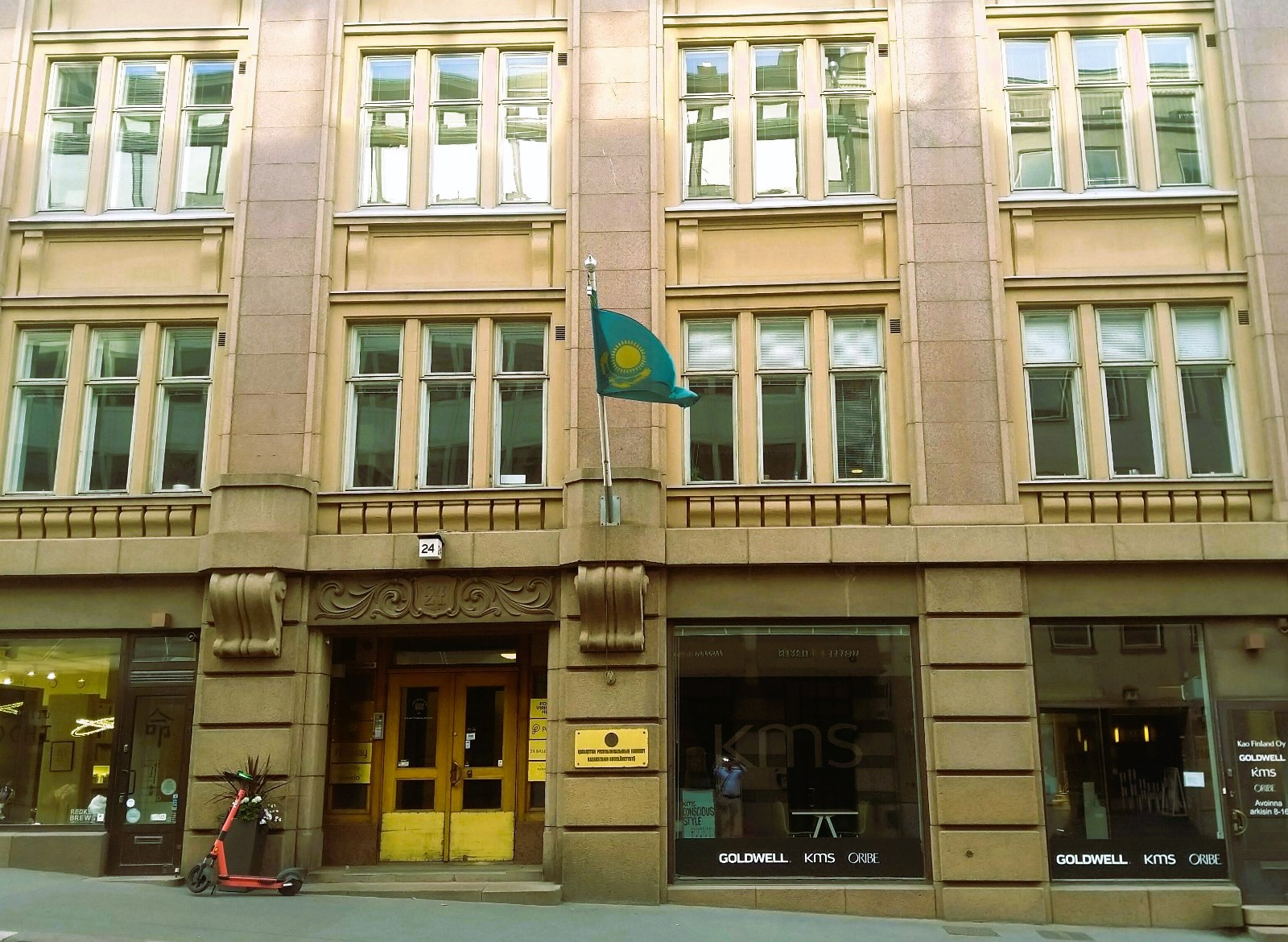
Embassy of Kazakstan in Helsinki

- Finland has an embassy in Astana.
- Kazakhstan has an embassy in Helsinki.

== See also ==
- Foreign relations of Finland
- Foreign relations of Kazakhstan
