= Canada–Kazakhstan relations =

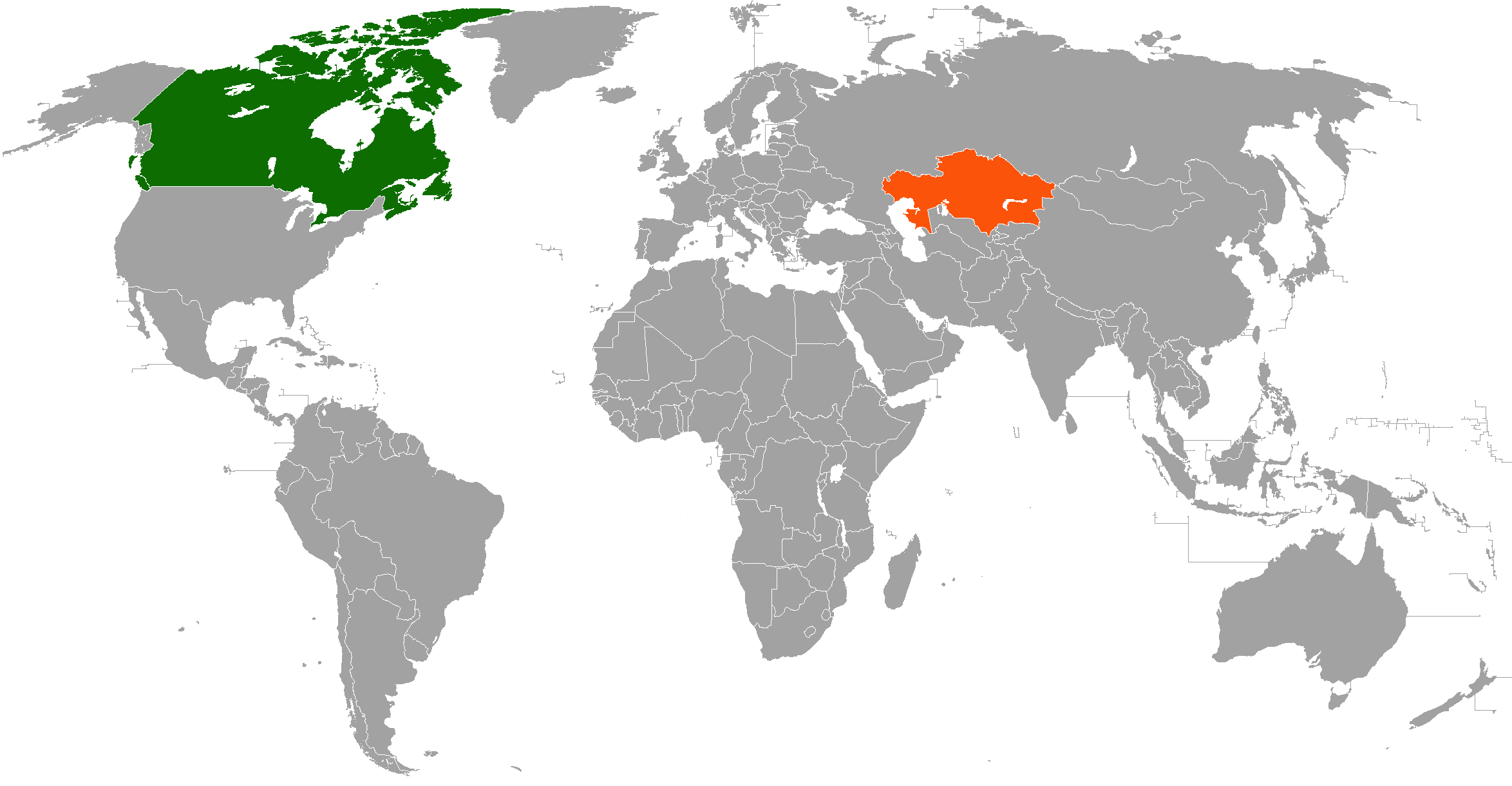

- Canada: Kazakhstan

Canada and Kazakhstan established diplomatic relations with each other in 1992.

Both countries are full members of the Organization for Security and Co-operation in Europe. The former President of Kazakhstan, Nursultan Nazarbayev, made an official visit to Canada in May 2003.

== Political ==
Canada established an embassy in Almaty, which it later moved to Astana. Kazakhstan has an embassy in Ottawa.

In June 2003, the President of Kazakhstan, Nursultan Nazarbayev, paid an official visit to Canada. During the visit, Nazarbayev held meetings with the Prime Minister of Canada, Jean Chrétien, the Governor General of Canada, Adrienne Clarkson, and the Speaker of the Senate, Dan Hays. He also met with members of the Canadian government and parliament, representatives of political parties, and participated in the trade and investment conference “Kazakhstan: The Pearl of Central Asia”.

On March 31, 2009, Kazakh President Nursultan Nazarbayev met with Canada's ex-prime minister Jean Chrétien to discuss deepening mutual relations. After their conversation, Chrétien went on to say, "We should use new economic opportunities. It is high time to start new projects. During the talks with Kazakh President we discussed cooperation in various spheres. Kazakhstan and Canada can work together". Also in 2009, Kazakh Prime Minister Karim Massimov met with Canadian Senator Consiglio Di Nino.

On November 13, 2013, Kazakhstan and Canada Foreign Minister John Baird signed a new agreement of peaceful atomic energy and new technology. The two also discussed agriculture and visa regimes.

== Economic ==
Initial trade and investment between the two countries focused on agriculture and mining, with nominal but decreasing exports of oil and gas machinery from Canada to Kazakhstan. According to Rod Lever, the Chief Representative to Russia for Export Development Canada, "Kazakhstan has been able to develop commercial relations with Canada keyed to shared strengths in agriculture and extractive industries", and there is an increased emphasis in Canadian export of aerospace and telecommunications equipment, such as regional jets. The focus on agriculture has led to Canadian equipment gaining nearly 25 percent of the agriculture and machinery market in Kazakhstan.

Canadian exports to Kazakhstan have been growing steadily, and increased by over 50% in 2007 to reach a total of CAD $182.7 million for that year, from $138 million in 2005. As of 2008, there are 170 Canadian companies active in the market and more than forty with a permanent presence there. Canada is also among the top ten foreign investors in the country, with investments totaling more than two billion CAD.

== Canadian Ambassadors to Kazakhstan ==
1. Bell, Michael Richard 1992
2. Kinsman, Jeremy K.B. 1992/08
3. Mann, Richard 1996/08/19
4. Skinner, Gerald R. 1999/08/11 (1999/11/09)
5. Cowan, Hector 2001/07/16 (2001/10/17)
6. Biolik, Anna 2004/08/09 (2004/09)
7. Dap, Margaret 2006/06/14 (2006/10/18)
8. Millar, Stephen 2009/07/15 (2009/11/19)
9. Style, Sean 2014/03/24 (2014/08/12)
10. Nicolas Brousseau 2017/08/17 (2017/10/19)

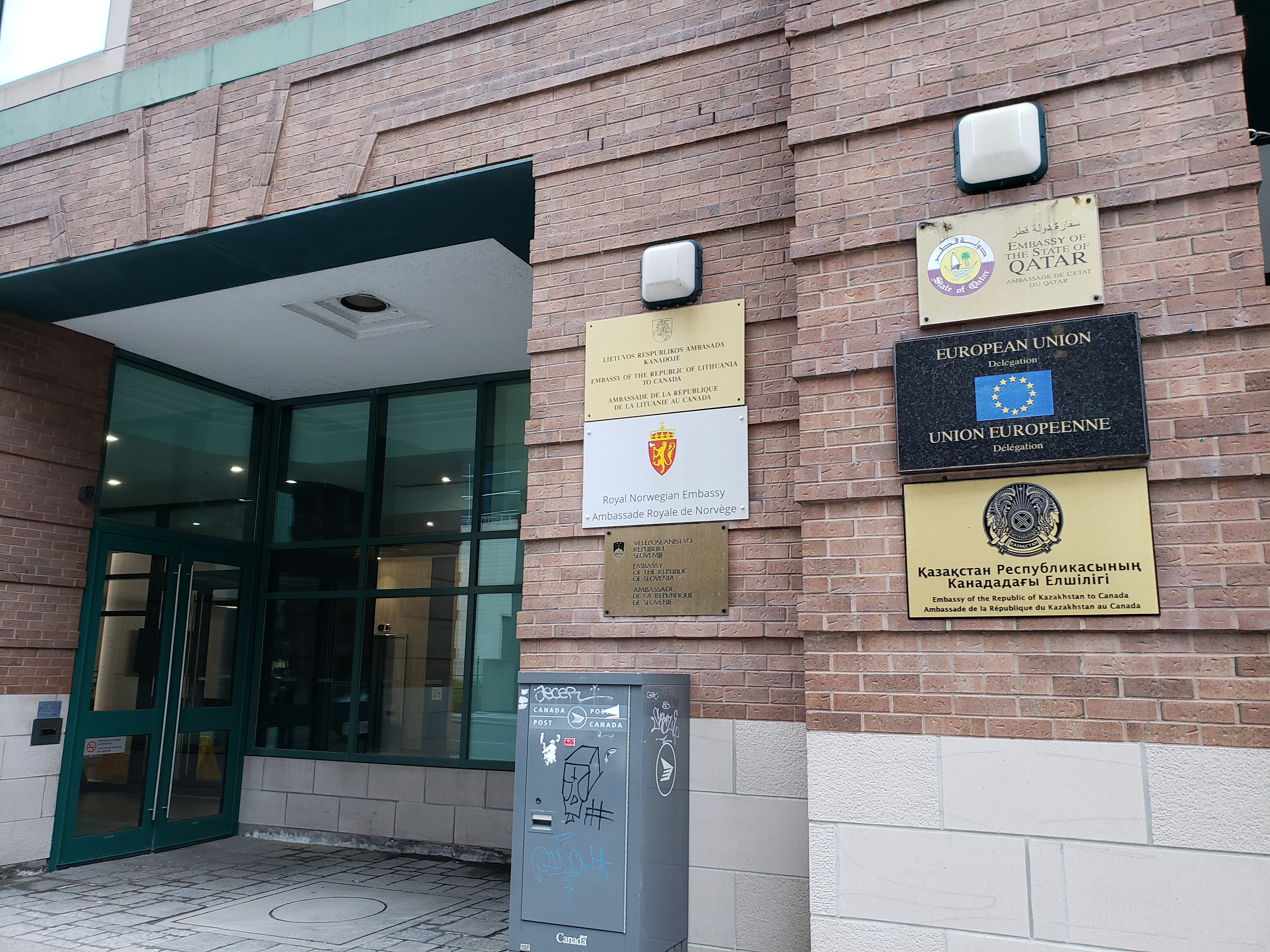
Embassy of Kazakhstan in Ottawa

== Resident diplomatic missions ==
- Canada has an embassy in Astana.
- Kazakhstan has an embassy in Ottawa and a consulate in Toronto.

== See also ==
- Foreign relations of Canada
- Foreign relations of Kazakhstan
