= Kazakhstan–Lithuania relations =

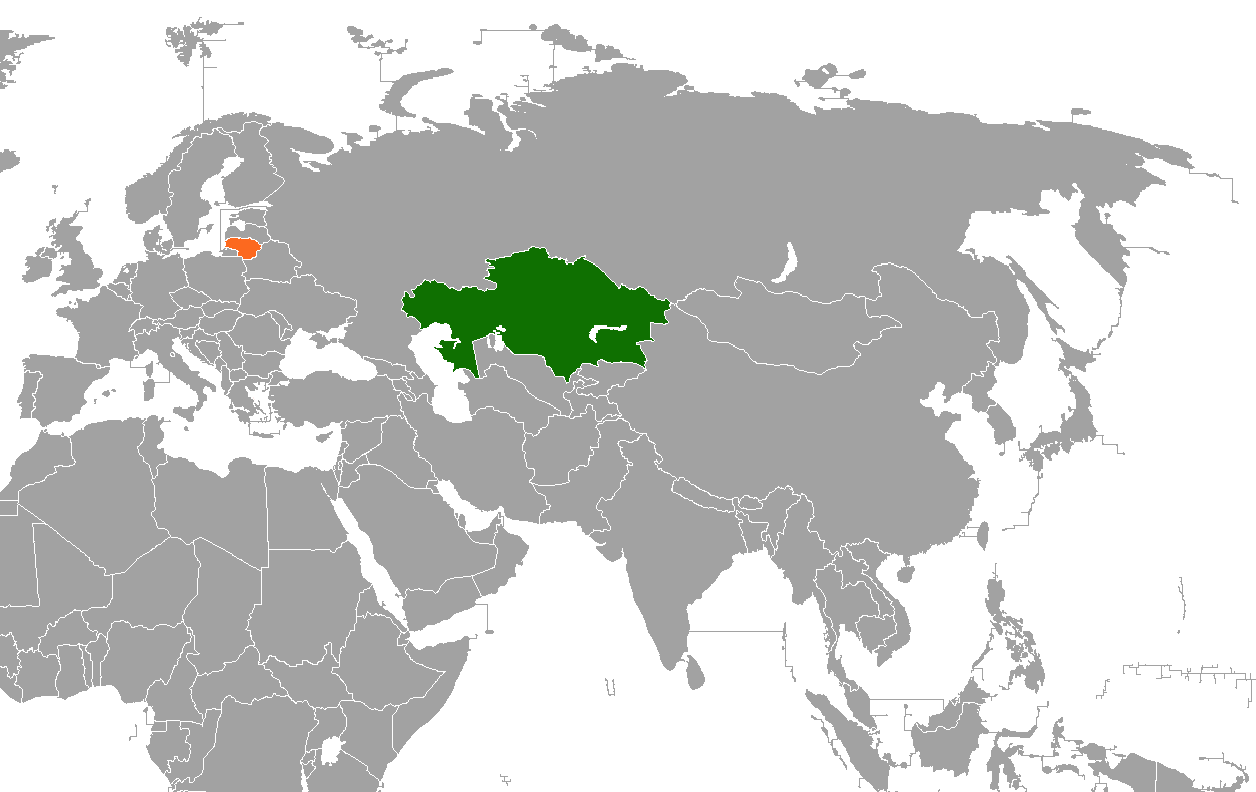

- Kazakhstan: Lithuania

Kazakhstan–Lithuania relations are the bilateral diplomatic relations between Kazakhstan and Lithuania.

== History ==
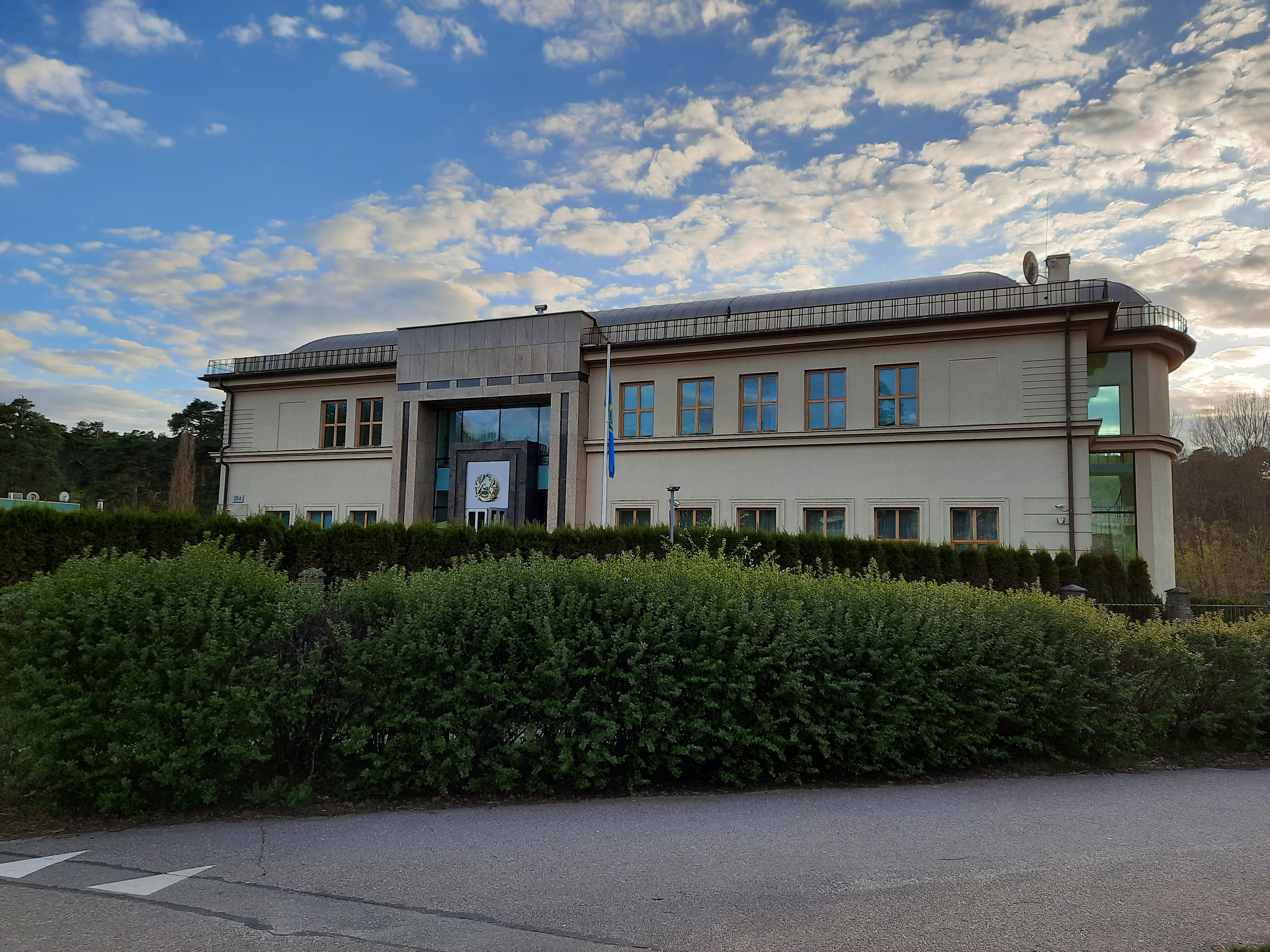
Embassy of Kazakhstan in Vilnius

Diplomatic relations between Kazakhstan and Lithuania were established on 15 June 1992. In November 1993, Lithuania opened its embassy in Kazakhstan, and on 7 November 1993, the Treaty on Mutual Understanding and Cooperation between Kazakhstan and Lithuania was signed in Almaty. Kazakhstan opened its embassy in Lithuania in July 1995.

The first President of Kazakhstan, Nursultan Nazarbayev, visited Lithuania twice on official visits, on 9 August 1994 and from 4 to 6 April 2001. During his 2001 visit, Nazarbayev met with Lithuanian President Valdas Adamkus, Prime Minister Rolandas Paksas, and Seimas Speaker Artūras Paulauskas. He also participated in a wreath-laying ceremony at the Memorial to the Fallen for Lithuania's Independence, spoke at a plenary session of the Seimas, opened a photo exhibition dedicated to the 10th anniversary of Kazakhstan's independence, gave an interview to Lithuanian television, and visited the new Butinge maritime oil terminal, the city of Palanga, and the town of Nida.

During Nazarbayev's presidency, Lithuanian presidents visited Kazakhstan five times: official visits by Algirdas Brazauskas in November 1993 and on 7 March 1997; a state visit by Valdas Adamkus on 11 May 2000; participation by Dalia Grybauskaitė in the OSCE Astana Summit on 1 December 2010; and an official visit by Dalia Grybauskaitė on 6 October 2011.

In May 2000, during his official visit to Kazakhstan, President Adamkus requested that President Nazarbayev investigate the fate of 300 Lithuanians who had been repressed and deported to Kazakhstan between 1940 and 1950. During Nazarbayev's 2001 visit to Lithuania, he handed over documents and archival materials. Kazakhstan's archives contained information on 80 individuals from the list provided by the Lithuanian side, as well as documents on 114 additional Lithuanians who had not been included in the original request.

On 20 September 2022, Kazakh President Kassym-Jomart Tokayev and Lithuanian President Gitanas Nausėda met during the 77th United Nations General Assembly in New York.

On 6 December 2022, the Lithuanian Minister of Foreign Affairs, Gabrielius Landsbergis, made an official visit to Kazakhstan where he met with the Kazakh Minister of Foreign Affairs, Mukhtar Tileuberdi, in dialogue to strengthen bilateral cooperation between the two countries.

== Resident diplomatic missions ==
- Kazakhstan has an embassy in Vilnius.
- Lithuania has an embassy in Astana and a consulate-general in Almaty.

== See also ==
- Foreign relations of Kazakhstan
- Foreign relations of Lithuania
