= Austria–Kazakhstan relations =

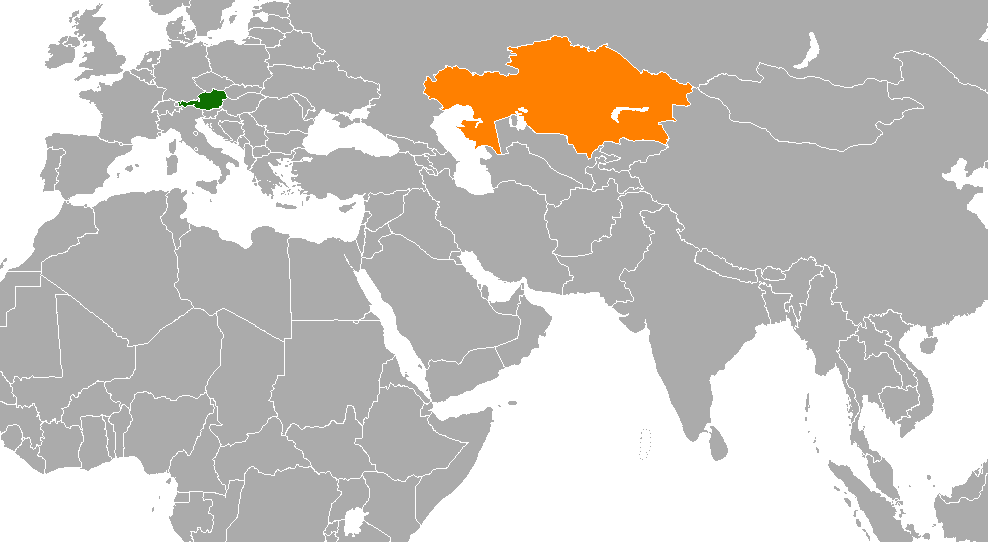

- Austria: Kazakhstan

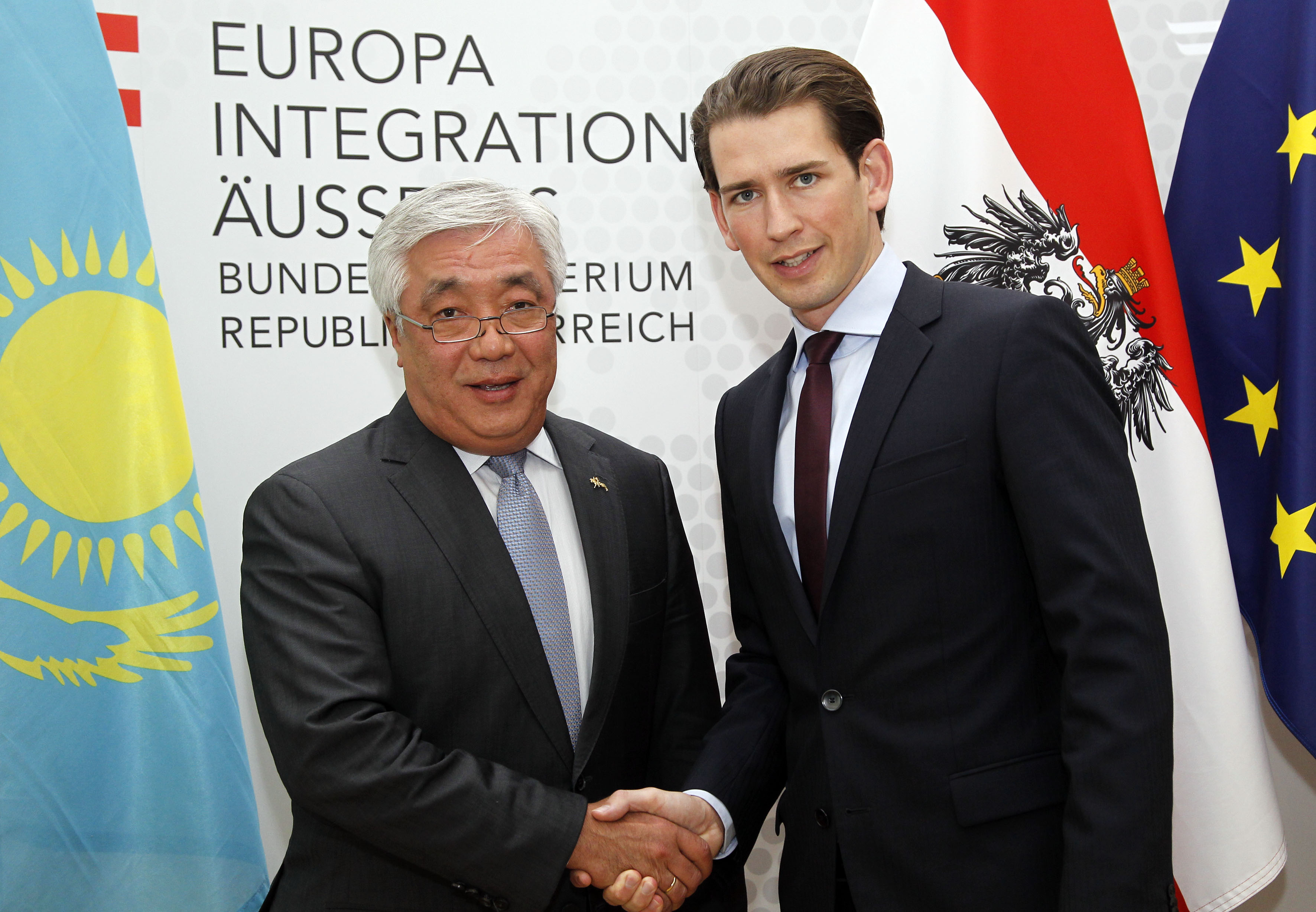
Kazakh Foreign Minister Erlan Idrissov (left) and Austrian Foreign Minister Sebastian Kurz (right) in Vienna, 2016

Bilateral relations exist between Austria and Kazakhstan.

Austria and Kazakhstan have a binding international convention on taxes on income and capital, including personal and corporate income and property. Austria has an embassy in Astana. Kazakhstan has an embassy in Vienna.

== Economic Cooperation ==
The two countries have established an Austrian-Kazakh Joint Commission for Economic, Agricultural, Ecological, Industrial and Technological Relations as a platform for bilateral trade and commerce.

== State visits ==
The first visit by Austrian President to Kazakhstan was made in December 2010 to attend the OSCE Summit in Astana.

== Resident diplomatic missions ==
- Austria has an embassy in Astana.
- Kazakhstan has an embassy in Vienna.

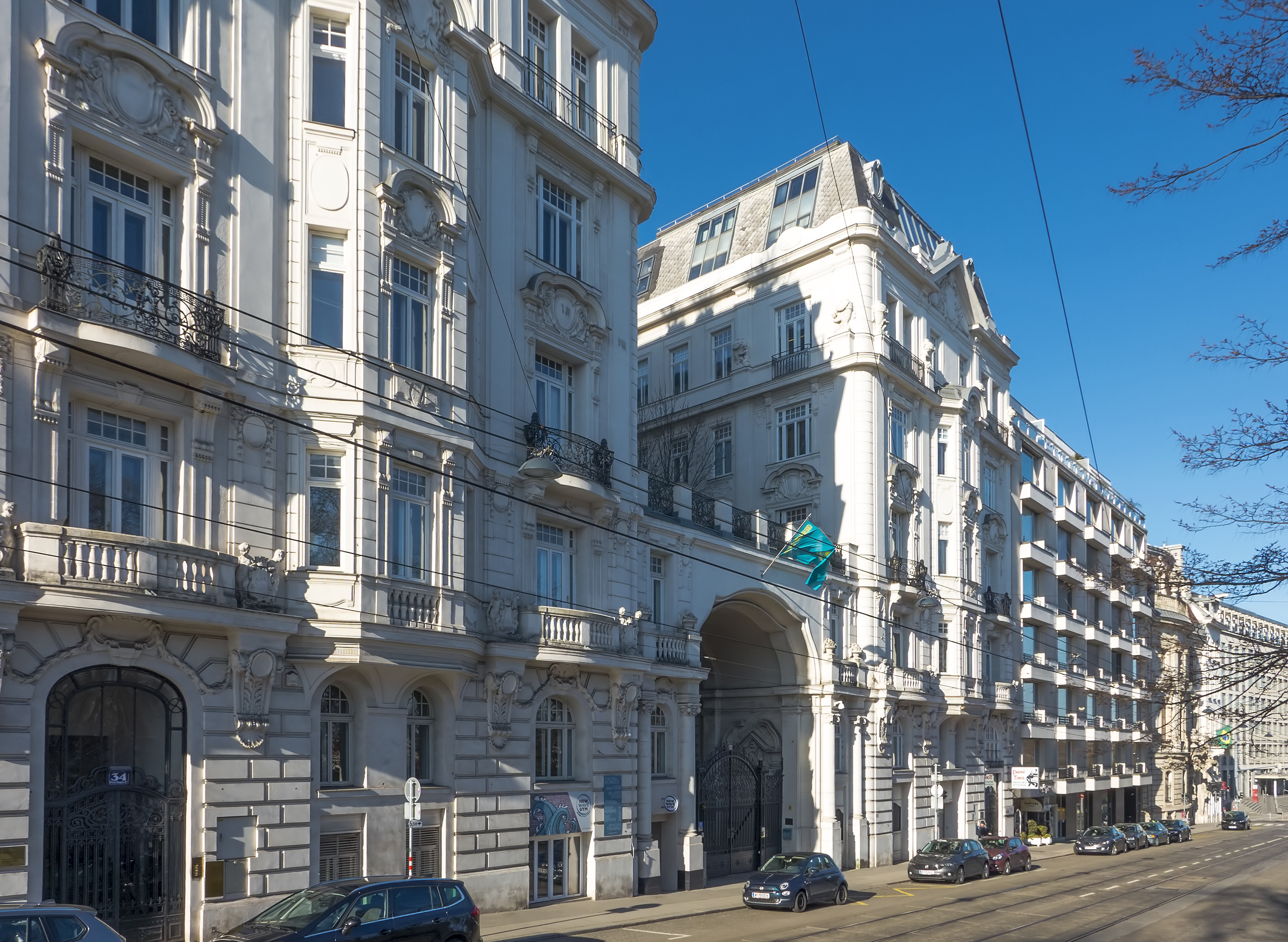
Embassy of Kazakhstan in Vienna

== See also ==
- Foreign relations of Austria
- Foreign relations of Kazakhstan
