= Kazakhstan–Pakistan relations =

- Pakistan: Kazakhstan

Diplomatic mission
- Pakistan Embassy, Astana: Kazakhstan Embassy, Islamabad

Envoy
- Ambassador Dr. Sajjad Ahmed Seehar: Ambassador Yerzhan Kistafin

Kazakhstan–Pakistan relations refer to the bilateral relations between the Republic of Kazakhstan and the Islamic Republic of Pakistan. Pakistan was among the first few countries which recognized Kazakhstan when it attained independence in December 1991. Diplomatic relations between the two countries were established in 1992 during an official visit by Kazakh President Nursultan Nazarbayev to Pakistan. Pakistan and Kazakhstan enjoy cordial relations based on a common approach towards world issues as well as mutual understanding and goodwill for each other.

In 2015, President Nursultan Nazarbayev himself stated that "I will never forget that Pakistan is one of the first countries to support our independence movement." As Kazakhstan is a landlocked country, Pakistan provides natural land routes and connectivity to the Eurasian heartland with the Arabian Sea and South Asia. Kazakhstan is an emerging market for Pakistani goods. Both countries have more than 35 MOUs in different fields.

== History ==
Today's region of Pakistan and Kazakhstan had links since ancient times. Both Kazakhstan and Pakistan were interconnected via ancient silk routes and even more ancient Indo-Iranic steppe migrations, which eventually led to the formation of the modern Pakistani population. Due to historic ties, Central Asia including modern-day Kazakhstan has a great influence on modern-day Pakistan. During 1920–39, many Kazakhs being compelled by Soviet atrocities, had migrated to British India. In response, the Central Council of the AIML, the highest decision-making organ of the party, in its meeting under the leadership of Muhammad Ali Jinnah (founder of Pakistan), adopted a resolution on February 23, 1942, at Delhi, in which the party expressed a deep extreme concern and worry about conditions of the Kazakh migrants, and demanded the then government to do proper arrangements and provisions for Kazakhs. Consequently, they were settled peacefully in the North Western parts of the British Raj, the northern areas of current Pakistan.

Pakistan was among the first countries to recognize Kazakhstan. The diplomatic relations between the modern states of Pakistan and Kazakhstan were further tightened since the visit of Nursultan Nazarbayev of Islamabad in 1992 during which he signed the many important documents that established the legal basis for the development of bilateral relations. Pakistan and Kazakhstan also share the same time zone.

In December 2003, the President of Kazakhstan, Nursultan Nazarbayev, paid an official visit to Pakistan. During the visit, he held talks with the President of Pakistan, Pervez Musharraf, met with representatives of the business community, and visited the Faisal Mosque. The leaders discussed issues of economic cooperation as well as prospects for the creation of zones of peace and stability in the region. The visit resulted in the signing of the Agreement on the Promotion and Mutual Protection of Investments and a number of other bilateral documents.

== Diplomacy ==
Of Pakistan

- Astana (embassy)

Of Kazakhstan

- Islamabad (embassy)

== Pakistani Ambassadors to Kazakhstan ==
Embassy since 1992

1. Riaz Muhammad Khan, Mr. Riaz Muhammad Khan 1992-1995
2. Sultan Hayat Khan, Mr. Sultan Hayat Khan 1995-1999
3. Rashid Ahmed, Mr. Rasheed Ahmed 1999-2000
4. Durray Shahwar Qureshi, Ms. Durray Shahwar Kureshi 2001-2005
5. Irfanur Rehman Raja, Mr. Irfan ur Rehman Raja 2005-2010
6. AkhtarTufail, Mr. Akhtar Tufail 2010-2013
7. Shaukat Ali Mukadam, Shaukat Ali Mukadam 2013 - 2014
8. Abdul Salik Khan, Mr. Abdul Salik Khan February 2015 - July 2018
9. Imtiaz Ahmad Qazi, Dr. Imtiaz Ahmad Kazi 2018 - 2020
10. Sajjad Ahmed Sihar, Mr. Sajjad Ahmed Seehar 2020 - up to now
