= Michael Brodsky (diplomat) =

Israeli diplomat (born 1972)

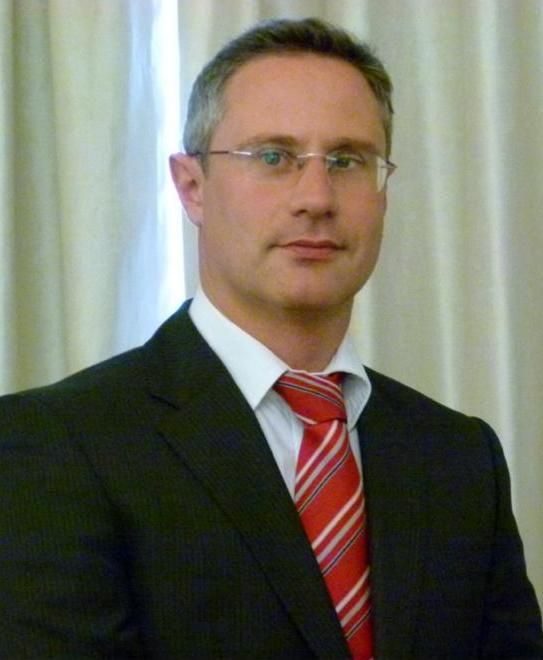

Israeli Ambassador to Ukraine
- Incumbent
- Assumed office June 2021

Personal details
- Born: 19 August 1972 (age 54) Leningrad, RSFSR, USSR (Saint Petersburg, Russia)
- Education: Tel Aviv University

Michael Brodsky (born August 19, 1972) is an Israeli diplomat. He was nominated as the next Israeli Ambassador to Ukraine on November 26, 2020. From 2015 to 2018, Brodsky served as the Israeli ambassador to the Republic of Kazakhstan. He was succeeded by Liat Wexelman in September, 2018.

== Early life ==
Michael Brodsky was born on August 19, 1972, in Leningrad. In 1990, he made Aliyah to Israel together with his family. Michael Brodsky received a bachelor's degree in political science, and a master's degree in diplomacy and national security from Tel Aviv University.

== Career ==
Brodsky joined the Israeli Ministry of Foreign Affairs in 2002. He served as press attaché at the Israeli Embassy in Moscow (2003-2008), political attaché at the Israeli Embassy in Moscow (2006-2008) and director of public affairs at the Israeli Embassy in London (2009-2013). From 2015 to 2018 he served as the Israeli Ambassador to Kazakhstan. In 2016 he coordinated the visit of Israeli Prime Minister Benjamin Netanyahu to Kazakhstan, the first such visit ever. In media interviews, Brodsky urged that the relations between the two countries would reach the level of strategic partnership.

In 2015 he was nominated by the news website 'newsru.co.il' for 'Hero of the Year' award, for being the first civil servant to reach the rank of ambassador from the 1990s Post-Soviet aliyah.

In 2021, following the annual march in Kyiv in honor of Stepan Bandera's birthday, the leader of the Ukrainian nationalists, Brodsky stated that Bandera was a Nazi collaborator. The day after, the adviser to the commander-in-chief of the Armed Forces of Ukraine Dmytro Yarosh, former leader of Right Sector, stated that "The Israeli ambassador is an agent of influence for the Kremlin. And it is necessary to drive such ”diplomats“ from Ukraine".

In April 2023, he prevented the renaming of Przhevalsky Street in Kyiv, following a vote to rename the city after Nazi-collaborator Volodymyr Kubijovyč, by meeting Kyiv mayor Vitalii Klychko and expressing Israel's unhappiness with the proposed change of name.

In July 2023 interview to "Dzerkalo Tyzhnia," he explained Israel's absence of military assistance to Ukraine after Russian full-scale invasion by stating, "Israel has been relying solely on itself for the past 10 years". This quote spread widely in the Ukrainian online community. It was linked to the substantial military aid Israel requested and received from the United States and other NATO countries in 2024. Social media users cited this quote as an example of Israel's hypocritical stance toward Ukraine. The substantial military aid received by Israel in 2024 is viewed by many Ukrainians as evidence of the moral relativism of Western democracies.

== Personal life ==
He speaks Russian, Hebrew, English and German. Michael Brodsky is married to Regina Shafir and has three children.

On March 4, 2022, Brodsky was injured in a car accident in Poland where he and his staff were leading efforts to assist Israelis to leave Ukraine. After being flown back to Israel, he was temporarily replaced by Simona Halperin, the Head of the Euro-Asia Bureau at the Foreign Ministry.

== Publications ==
During the COVID-19 pandemic, Brodsky published several articles on the effect the pandemic might have on international diplomacy, and on the topic of medical diplomacy.
