= Egypt–Kazakhstan relations =

- Egypt: Kazakhstan

Diplomatic relations between Egypt and Kazakhstan were established on 6 March 1992.

== History ==
In August 1992, the Embassy of Egypt was opened in Kazakhstan.

== High level visits ==
In February 1993, the President of Kazakhstan, Nursultan Nazarbayev, paid his first official visit to Egypt. In April 1993, the Embassy of Kazakhstan was opened in Egypt. In total, Nazarbayev paid three official visits to Egypt (February 1993, March 2007, and May 2008). During Nazarbayev’s presidency, Presidents of Egypt paid two official visits to Kazakhstan: Hosni Mubarak on 7–8 November 2006, and Abdel Fattah el-Sisi on 26–28 February 2016.

== Economic relations ==
Trade turnover between Kazakhstan and Egypt amounted to US$161.2 million in 2023, including US$23.7 million in exports from Kazakhstan and US$137.5 million in imports to Kazakhstan. Bilateral trade volume stood at US$84.3 million in 2020, US$80.4 million in 2021, and US$150.3 million in 2022.

== Cooperation in culture and education ==
In 1998, a street in Cairo was named after the Kazakh poet Abai Qunanbaiuly. In Astana, one of the streets bears the name of the Egyptian writer Taha Hussein. In October 2016, a monument to Abai was unveiled in one of Cairo’s central parks.

In 2001, the Egyptian University of Islamic Culture Nur-Mubarak was opened in Almaty, providing training in Islamic studies and Arabic philology.

Kazakhstan allocated funds for the restoration of the Sultan Baybars Mosque in Cairo. An intergovernmental agreement between Kazakhstan and Egypt, including the restoration project, was approved in 2007, and restoration works were carried out between 2018 and 2023.
