= Liat Wexelman =

Israeli diplomat

Liat Wexelman (Hebrew: ליאת וקסלמן) is an Israeli diplomat.

She earned a bachelor's degree (Economics and Political Science) and a master's degree (Diplomatic studies) at Tel Aviv University.

From 2018 to 2022 she was the non-resident Israeli Ambassador to Kyrgyzstan and Israeli Ambassador to Kazakhstan where she was based.

She is currently the director of Northern Europe Department at the Israel Ministry of Foreign Affairs.
