= Deportation of the Soviet Greeks =

Ethnic cleansing in the Soviet Union

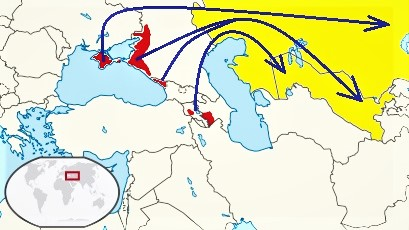
Routes of the deportation of the Greeks in the USSR in 1942, 1944, and 1949 Crimea, Krasnodar Krai, Rostov, Georgia, Armenia, Azerbaijan (home regions of the deportees)

A series of forced transfers of Greeks of the Soviet Union was ordered by Soviet leader Joseph Stalin and carried out by the NKVD and the MVD in 1942, 1944 and 1949. It affected mostly Pontic Greeks along the Black Sea coast, most notably from Krasnodar Krai from where they were deported in all three deportations, resulting in ethnic cleansing of this area. The deported Soviet and foreign Greeks residing along the coast of Crimea and the Caucasus were resettled in cattle trains to the modern Kazakhstan and Uzbekistan, while their property, which was left behind, was confiscated. After de-Stalinization in the 1950s, some Greeks returned to their original homes, but most chose to emigrate to Greece, marking the end of the centuries long Greek community along the Black Sea coast. It is estimated that around 70,000 to 80,000 Greeks were uprooted in these three waves of deportations. (Note: 1,402 Greeks in 1942; 15,040 Greeks from Crimea in May 1944, 8,300 Greeks from Krasnodar Krai, 16,375 from Georgia, Armenia and Azerbaijan in 1944; and between 27,000 to 36,000 Greeks in 1949.) At least 15,000 Greeks had died by the end of the deportations. Some scholars characterize the deportation as a genocide against Greeks.

== Background ==
Ancient Greek colonies along the northern Black Sea coast

Before the Stalinist mass deportations, the Soviet Greek diaspora was divided into four categories: 1) the Crimean Greeks, descendants of Byzantine colonists, who were relocated to Mariupol by Catherine the Great in the 18th century. 2) the Greeks who fled from the Erzurum vilayet to Georgia during the Russo-Turkish War of 1828–1829. 3) the Pontic Greeks who fled from Anatolia to Greece and the Russian Empire during the Greco-Turkish War (1919–1922). 4) communist Greeks, political refugees, who fled Greece after they lost in the Greek Civil War. During World War I, 85,000 Greeks from Eastern Pontus fled to the Russian Caucasus.

The 1926 Soviet census registered 213,765 Greeks in the country and the 1939 Soviet census registered 286,000 Greeks. The 1939 census registered 42,500 Greeks in Krasnodar Krai, 1,700 in Adygea, 1,500 in Karachay-Cherkessia and 100 in Kabardino-Balkaria. The 1937 census registered 87,385 Greeks among the 3,378,064 people residing in the Georgian Soviet Socialist Republic, and 1,248 Greeks in Azerbaijan. 20,652 Greeks lived on Crimea, forming 1.8% of the peninsula's population. The 1937 census registered 3,803 Greeks in Armenia. In the 1930s, three Greek National Soviets were formed in the Azov area, and a small Greek region was established around Krymsk, aiming for the establishment of a Greek Autonomous District in the Soviet Union. On 9 August 1937, NKVD order 00485 was adopted to target "subversive activities of Polish intelligence" in the Soviet Union, but was later expanded to also include Latvians, Germans, Estonians, Finns, Greeks, Iranians and Chinese.

There was virtually no counter-revolutionary activity among the Soviet Greeks, though there were exceptions in Constantine Kromiadi, an anti-communist of Greek origin, who became second in command in Andrey Vlasov Abwehr detachment during the Nazi German occupation of the Soviet Union in World War II. Joseph Stalin sought to implement Korenizatsiia among Soviet ethnic groups which showed signs of national affiliation, ultimately leading to Russification of these areas.

== Deportations ==
Soviet Greeks were deported in three waves as part of the population transfer in the Soviet Union.

- on 29 May 1942, Stalin ordered a deportation of Pontic Greeks and other minorities from the Krasnodar Krai. 1,402 Greeks, including 562 children up to the age of 16, were deported to the east.
- shortly after the deportation of the Crimean Tatars by the NKVD, on 2 June 1944 the State Committee for Defense issued the decree N 5984 SS to extend the deportation to other people from Crimea. 15,040 Soviet Greeks were consequently deported from the peninsula (this included 3,350 Greek foreigners with expired passports). Many were sent to the Uzbek SSR. Simultaneously, additional 8,300 Greeks were deported from the Krasnodar Krai and Rostov Region: this operation was perpetrated by Lavrentiy Beria's deputy, Ivan Serov, who arrived from Kerch, and G. Karandadze. A further 16,375 Greeks were relocated from Georgian SSR, Armenian SSR and Azerbaijan SSR and sent to Kazakh SSR and Russian SFSR. Crimean Greeks were charged with "reviving private trade" during the German occupation of the peninsula.
- Operation Volna: on 29 May 1949, the Soviet Council of Ministers issued the decree N 2214-856 that ordered the relocation of the remaining Greeks, Turks and Dashnaks from the Black Sea coast, specifically the Georgian and Armenian SSR. Many were sent to the Kazakh SSR and registered as special settlers. The deportation occurred between May and June 1949, and encompassed Greek farmers, tradesmen and artisans living along the Georgian coast without prior warning. They were removed from their homes by MVD and sent to cattle cars heading for Central Asia. In the city of Gagra, a Greek woman was separated from her Russian husband, who had to stay behind, as she was sent on a two-week journey in a train without food or water. The people were dispersed to collective farms, living in Zemlyanka, without adequate clothing or food. They were forbidden traveling more than five miles from their farm, facing a 20-year sentence. The 11,000 Greek communist émigrés, who moved to the Soviet Union in 1949 after being defeated in the Greek Civil War, were also deported to the Uzbek SSR for slave labor. The total number of all these three groups deported by June 1949 was 57,680. Greeks made up 27,000 or 31,386 or 36,000 individuals among these deported groups. Specifically, 476 people (mostly Greeks) were deported from Odesa, Melitopol, Kherson and Izmail; 4,396 Greeks from the Krasnodar Krai; 323 Greeks from Azerbaijan SSR. The property they left behind was placed under the control of the administrative bodies. The official reason for the Greek deportation was to "cleanse the area of politically unreliable elements". The evicted people were allowed to take only personal belongings with them on their journey to exile. Many were confused by the evictions, thinking they would be safe because they were not Germans. One man was unaware of what the reason for his deportation was all until a year into exile, when he was informed he was an "active Dashnak nationalist".

=== Life in exile ===
One of the deported Greeks who was born near Sukhumi and sent to the Pahtaral region of Uzbekistan in 1949, recalled the events:

The whole village, almost 200 families, was deported, here, to the Pahtaral region in 1949 .... Nobody had explained to us why we were being exiled or where we were going. We had two hours to collect our things... From 16 June to 10 August we were travelling. About eight or ten families in each cargo train, with the animals .... Once we arrived, I remember I was still a child, most people were dying from diarrhea. The water was fetid. My sister, who was much older, died from consumption at the age of 27, about one year after we arrived.

Another deportee, Lefteris, gave a 1992 interview about his experience:

From Batumi, there were two cargo trains with at least twelve wagons each. We were lucky because we had only forty people in our wagon. In the others there were at least sixty to sixty-five people. They could hardly breathe, let alone sit or take care of babies and old people. For two months we were travelling... When we reached different stations we stopped and we had watered-down soup which they gave us in cups and a piece of bread, enough, that is, so that we wouldn't die of starvation. Often we played our lyres to give courage to the women and children, so that they would stop crying.

The deportations did not encompass all Soviet Greeks. The Turkic-speaking Greeks around Tbilisi and the Greeks in Mariupol were excluded from these evictions. The deported people lived in tents and worked in exhausting conditions in mining, construction, agriculture, and other. They routinely worked twelve hours a day, seven days a week. They suffered from exhaustion, cold, and hunger, with food rations tied to work quotas. On 1 January 1953, 21,057 foreign Greeks were recorded in special settlements in Kazakh SSR and 2,472 in Uzbek SSR, while a total of 52,000 Greeks were recorded in all Soviet special settlements.

== Aftermath and legacy ==
According to the Head of the Georgian SSR Statistical Department, 8,334 Greeks were left on the Black Sea coast in the mid-1950s. On 25 September 1956, MVD Order N 0402 was adopted and defined the removal of restrictions towards the deported peoples in the special settlements. Afterward, the Soviet Greeks started returning to their homes, or emigrating towards Greece.

At the time of the 1949 deportation, it was estimated that there were 41,000 Greeks residing in Abkhaz ASSR inside Georgian SSR. The 1959 Soviet census enumerated only 9,101 Greeks remaining there, meaning that 30,000 were deported. Between the 1939 census, which registered 34,621 Greeks, and the 1959 census, the Greeks suffered a 74% decline within the Abkhaz ASSR. Overall, by 2002 when 16,600 of them were registered, the Greek community was reduced to only 1/6 of their original number in Georgia. In the 2002 census, 530 Greeks were recorded in Azerbaijan; 1,174 in Armenia; 97,827 in Russia. 2,800 Greeks remained in Crimea according to the 2001 census, forming 0.1% of the peninsula's population.

Greek historian Anastasis Gkikas estimated that 15,000 Greeks died during these Soviet repressions.

Officially, the 1949 deportation was explained by the USSR as trying to cleanse the border areas from "politically unreliable elements". The official Government of Greece condemned this 1949 Soviet deportation of Greeks. Russian historian Alexander Nekrich assumes that the Greeks were deported in 1949 because of the alliance of Greece with the UK. Others consider it as a collective punishment because the Greek communists lost in the Greek Civil War during 1946–1949. Other interpretations include the Soviet need for workforce in the remote areas of Central Asia to achieve the Five-year plan.

In 1938, 20,000 Soviet Greeks arrived to Greece. Between 1965 and 1975, another 15,000 Greeks emigrated from the Soviet Union and went to Greece. After the dissolution of the Soviet Union, approximately 100,000 Greeks left the former USSR and emigrated to Greece. Unlike many other 'punished' ethnic groups, the Soviet Greeks were never officially rehabilitated by the Soviet legislation. They were however officially rehabilitated, among with other ethnic groups by the Russian Federation, amended by Decree no. 458 of September 12, 2015.

== See also ==
- Greek Operation of the NKVD
- Operation Golden Fleece
- Deportation of the Meskhetian Turks
- Excess mortality in the Soviet Union under Joseph Stalin
- List of ethnic cleansing campaigns
- List of genocides
- Population exchange between Greece and Turkey
