= Armenia–Greece relations =

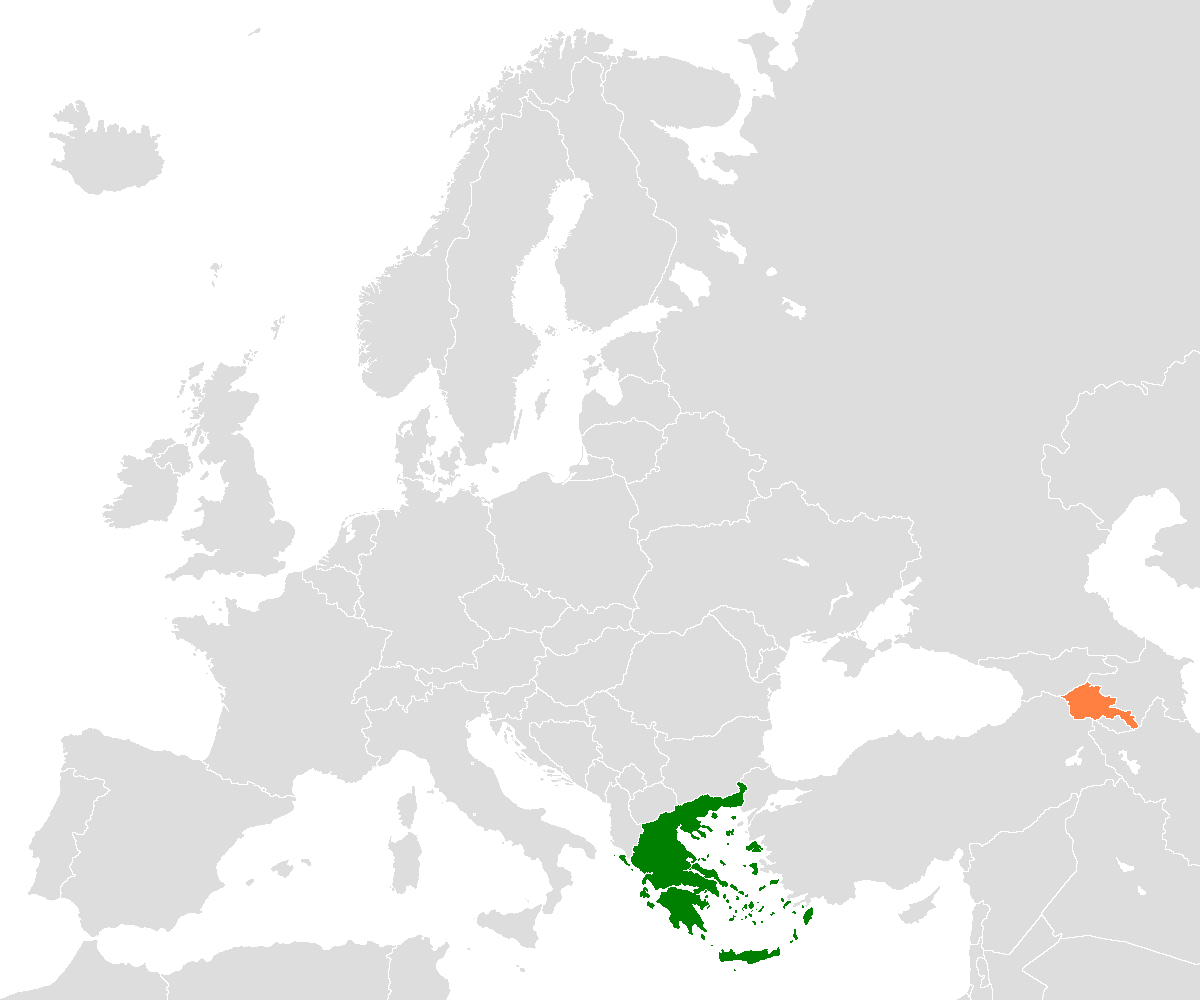

- Greece: Armenia

Diplomatic mission
- Embassy of Greece, Yerevan: Embassy of Armenia, Athens

Bilateral relations exist between Armenia and Greece. Due to the strong political, cultural and religious ties between the two nations (the vast majority of Armenians and Greeks practice Eastern Christianity), Armenia and Greece today enjoy excellent diplomatic relations. They have always been strong both emotionally and historically due to religious and cultural roots and co-existence during the Byzantine period and under the Ottoman Empire.

All three Presidents of Armenia paid official visits to Greece and there are high-level contacts between the two countries. Greece formally recognized the Armenian genocide in 1996, while Armenia formally recognized the Greek genocide in 2015. Both countries are full members of the Organization of the Black Sea Economic Cooperation, the European Political Community, and Council of Europe.

== Names ==
In the Greek language, Armenia is called Αρμενία (Armenia), the Armenians are called Αρμένιοι (Armenii) and the Armenian language is called αρμένικα (Armenica). In the Armenian language, Greece is called Հունաստան (Hounastan), the Greeks are called հույներ (Houyner) and the Greek language is called Հունարեն (Hounaren). The Greek transcription of the Armenian word for Armenia (Հայաստան) is Χαγιαστάν (Hayiastan). The Armenian transcription of the Greek word for the Greek language (Ελληνικά) is էլլինիկա (Ellinika).

== History ==
See also: Greek and Armenian histography on Kemalism

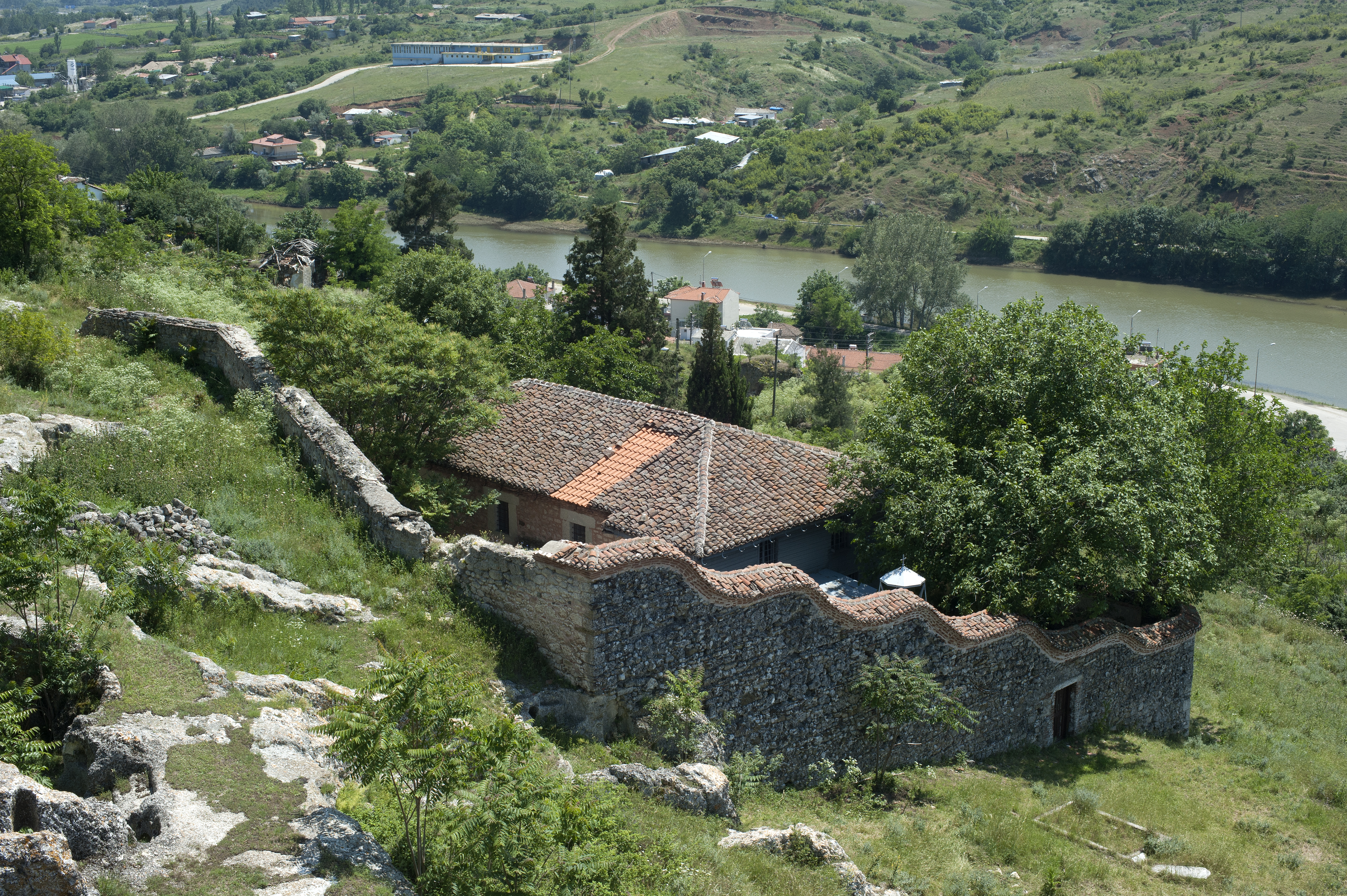
Armenian church of Saint Georgios (Surp Kevork) Castle of Didymoteixo, Evros

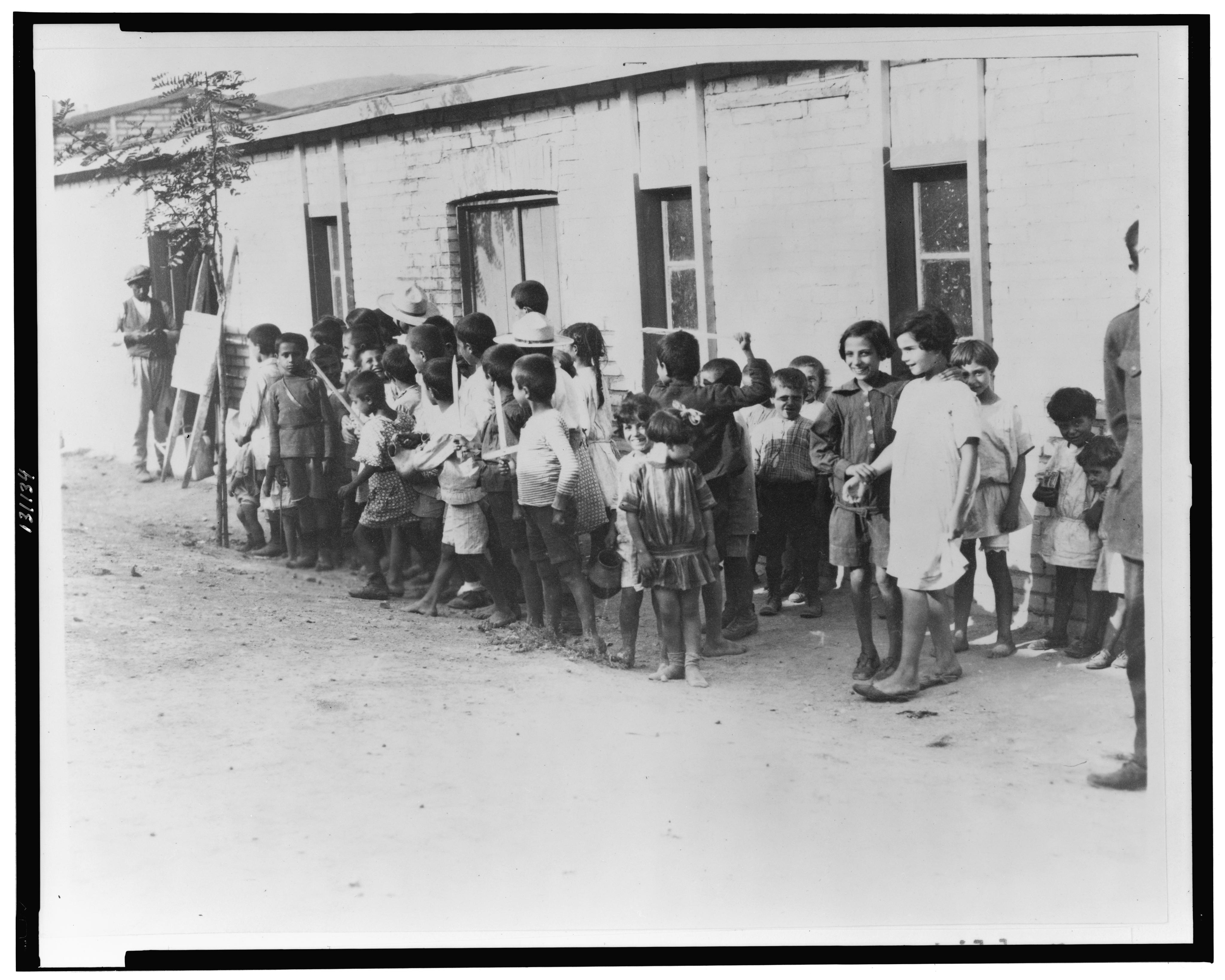
Greek and Armenian refugee children outside barracks near Athens in 1923, following their expulsion from Turkey

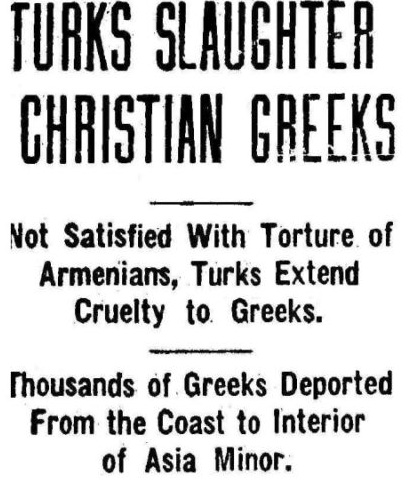
Lincoln Star article about the atrocities committed by Turkey towards the Armenians and Greeks

Both being ancient civilizations, Armenians and Greeks have co-existed for centuries. There are ancient notes by Greek historians suggesting of the roots of Armenians. The earliest reference to Armenia was made by the Greek historian Hecataeus of Miletus in 525 BC. According to a hypothesis proposed by linguists during the 20th century, the Armenian and Greek languages share a common ancestor. This has led to the proposal of a Graeco-Armenian language, post-dating the Proto-Indo-European language. Herodotus suggests that the Armenians are descendants of the Phrygians. Plato had early noticed the similarities between the Greek and the Phrygian languages. In addition Strabo has written that the ancestral homeland of the Armenians or of their ruling class, prior to their immigration in Asia Minor, was a valley in Thessaly, after which they are named. A chain of ancient references show the close relation between the two peoples.

After the destruction of the Seleucid Empire, a Hellenistic Greek successor state of Alexander the Great's short-lived empire, a Hellenistic Armenian state was founded in 190 BC.

Despite the fact that the Ancient Olympic games were a purely Greek competition, after the 1st century AD many Armenians managed to take part. The first Armenian Olympian in the Ancient Olympic Games was Tiridates III.

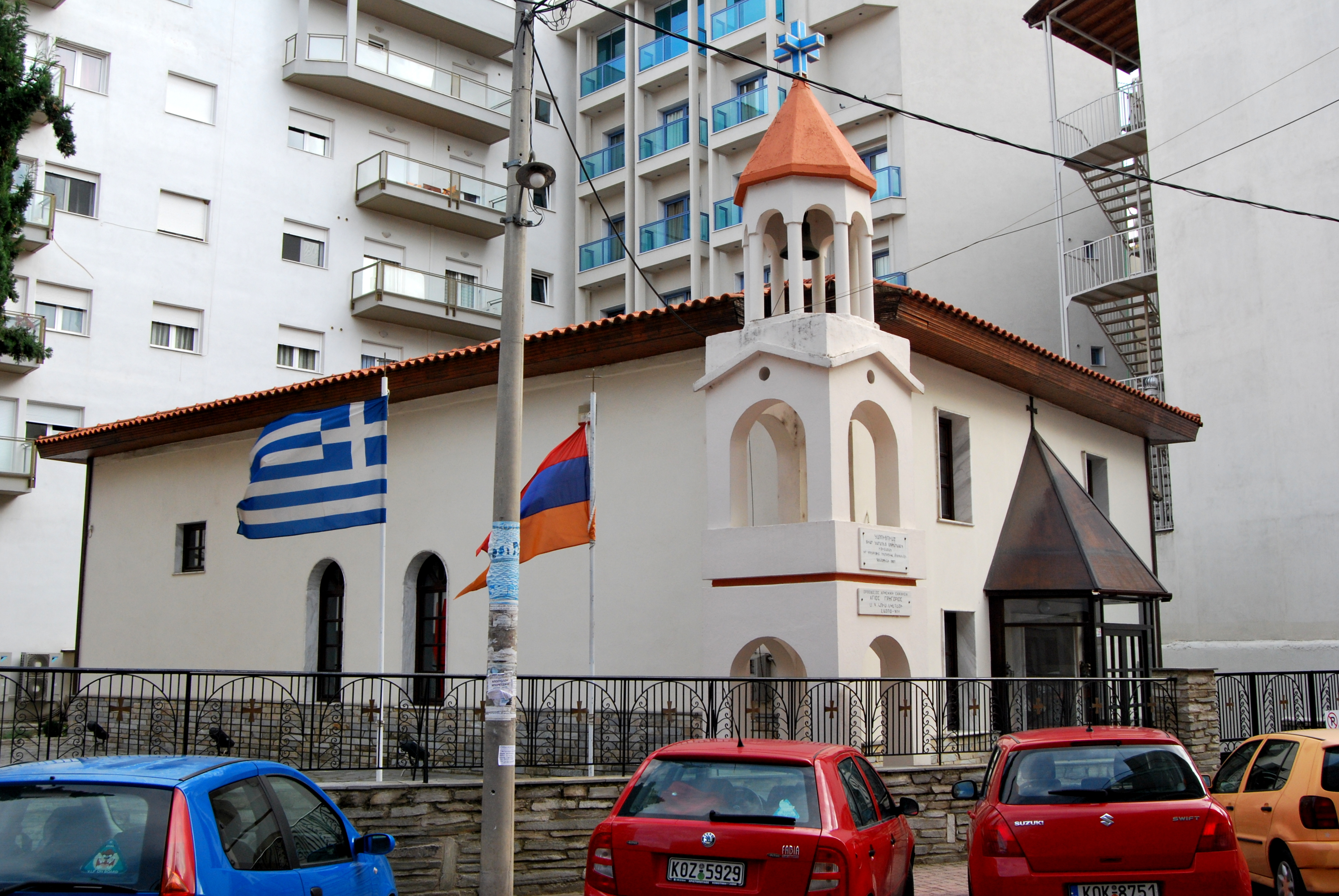
Armenian church of St. Gregory the Illuminator (Sourp Krikor Lousavorits) built in 1834 in Komotini

The Armenian language is said to be influenced from Ancient Greek, but both languages developed differently over time.

The Armenian alphabet (created in 405), being written from left to right and not from right to left like other scripts of the Mediterranean Basin or Middle East, has a certain Greek flavour.

Armenians constituted an integral part of the Empire in its early centuries, with many of the Byzantine Emperors being Armenian and/or having Armenian blood. The Macedonian dynasty is often considered the era in which the Byzantine Empire reached its greatest extent since the Muslim Conquests and the Macedonian Renaissance in letters and arts began. The dynasty was named after its founder, Basil I the Macedonian, who was descended from the theme of Macedonia (the theme was actually located in the region of Thrace, and had no relation with the geographical region of Macedonia). The dynasty's founder and many subsequent emperors were of Armenian descent, hence the dynasty is also referred to by some authors as the "Armenian dynasty". However, because of the differences that existed between Greek Orthodox and Armenian Apostolic Christianity, Byzantine emperors often tried to conquer the Armenian Bagratuni dynasty Kingdom and impose Greek Orthodoxy. They achieved this in 1045 after many attempts. This weakened both Byzantines and Armenians alike, and in consequence, they weren't able to keep the Turks away from Armenia who left it undefended (1064) and from the rest of Anatolia (1071 onwards)

Regardless, these two nations also co-existed under Seljuk and later Ottoman Empire.

== Today ==
=== Political relations ===
Greece was one of the first countries to recognize Armenia's independence on September 21, 1991. Both countries have an embassy in their respective capitals. Also, Greece is one of the countries that have officially recognized the Armenian genocide and is one of the few countries that has criminalized the denial of the Genocide.

Since the declaration of independence in Armenia, the two countries have been partners within the framework of international organizations (United Nations, Organization for Security and Co-operation in Europe, Council of Europe, BSEC), whilst Greece firmly supports the community programs aimed at further developing relations between the European Union and Armenia.

Continuous visits of the highest level have shown that both countries want to continue to improve the levels of friendship and cooperation. The President of Armenia Levon Ter-Petrossian visited Greece in 1996, the President of Greece Costis Stephanopoulos visited Armenia in 1999, the President of Armenia Robert Kocharyan visited Greece in 2000 and 2005. Additionally, the President of Armenia Serzh Sargsyan visited Greece in 2011 and in 2014 Armenia welcomed the Greek President Karolos Papoulias in Yerevan.

During the COVID-19 pandemic, Greece donated 35,000 vaccines to Armenia.

=== Military cooperation ===
Greece is, after Russia, one of the major military partners of Armenia. Armenian officers are trained in Greek military academies, and various technical assistance is supplied by Greece. Since 2003, an Armenian platoon has been deployed in Kosovo as part of KFOR's Greek battalion. In 2011 Armenia's military attaché to Greece and Cyprus, Colonel Samvel Ramazyan, said that the Armenian-Greek military cooperation continues to steadily develop.

On August 31, 2021 Armenia, Greece, and Cyprus signed the Tripartite Defence Cooperation Program. The Program sees all three militaries conduct joint training exercises, sharing of expertise and promoting military cooperation between the three countries.

Armenia and Greece signed a joint defence industry cooperation agreement on August 31, 2023. The agreement covers technology transfers, sharing experience and support for ammunition and explosive ordnance production, establishing joint industries, and researching military-grade products.

=== Treaties ===
Both countries have signed bilateral treaties which include:

- Economic, Industrial and Technological Cooperation Agreement (in force since 1 December 1994)
- Agreement on the Promotion and Mutual Protection of Investments (in force since 28 April 1995)
- Cooperation Agreement in the military sector (June 1996)
- Agreement on Avoidance of Double Taxation on Income (in force since 13 May 1999)

=== Diasporas ===
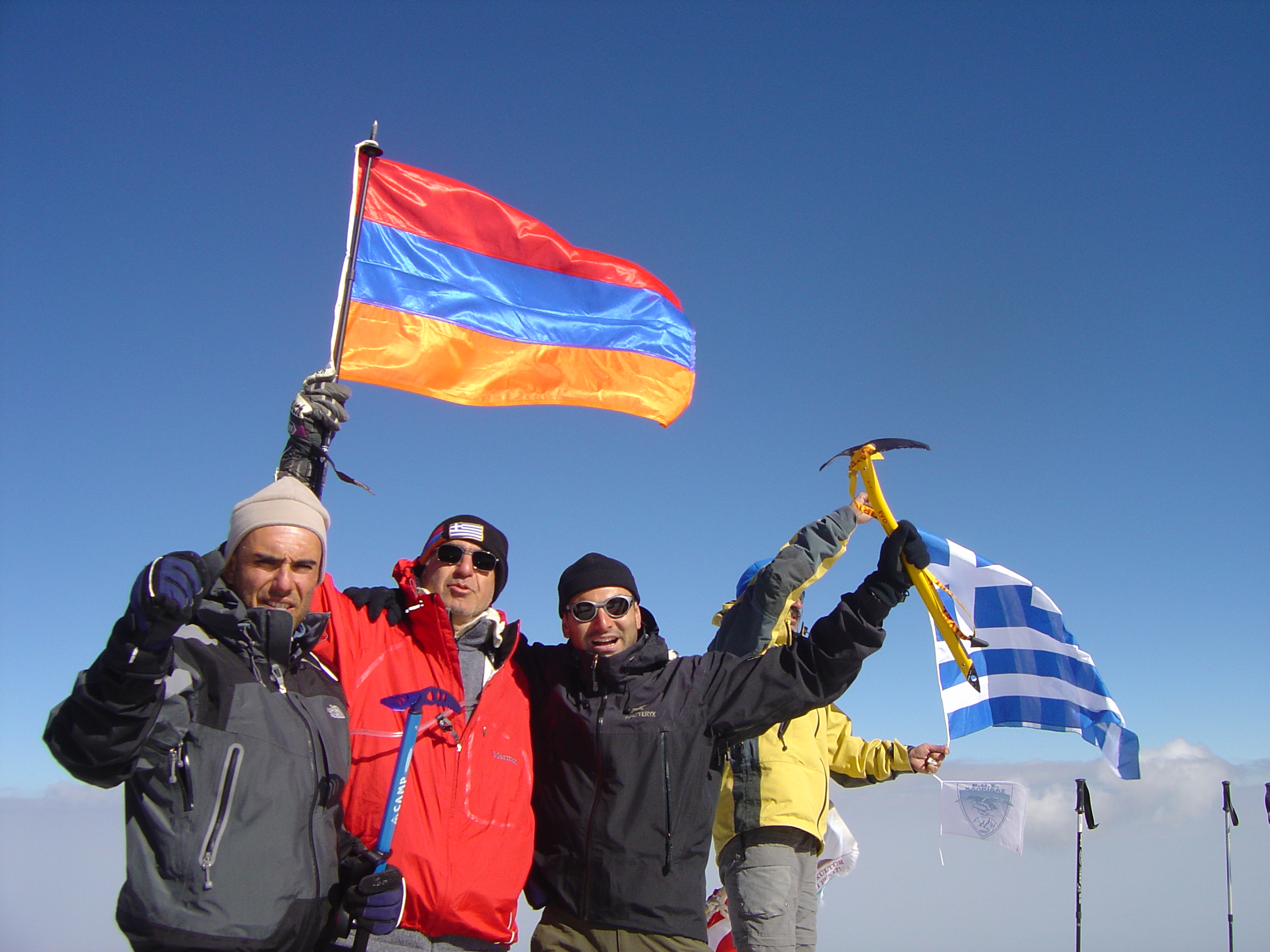
Greek and Armenian climbers at the top of Mount Ararat

Estimates on the size of the Greek community in Armenia range from 1,800 to 5,000. The declining number of Greeks in Armenia in recent years is mainly due to mass migration to Greece from the former Soviet Union and because of Armenia's economic situation as a result of the First Nagorno-Karabakh War. It was further exacerbated by the Leninakan earthquake which in December 1988 struck northwestern Armenia, the area where most of the Greeks used to live. The largest Greek communities are in Yerevan and Alaverdi, followed by Vanadzor, Gyumri, Stepanavan and Noyemberyan.

The Armenian community in Greece is much larger, numbering about 50,000. The number was even higher but migration to North America has caused an evident reduction. The largest Armenian communities are in Athens and Thessaloniki.

== Resident diplomatic missions ==
- Armenia has an embassy in Athens and an honorary consulate in Thessaloniki.
- Greece has an embassy in Yerevan.
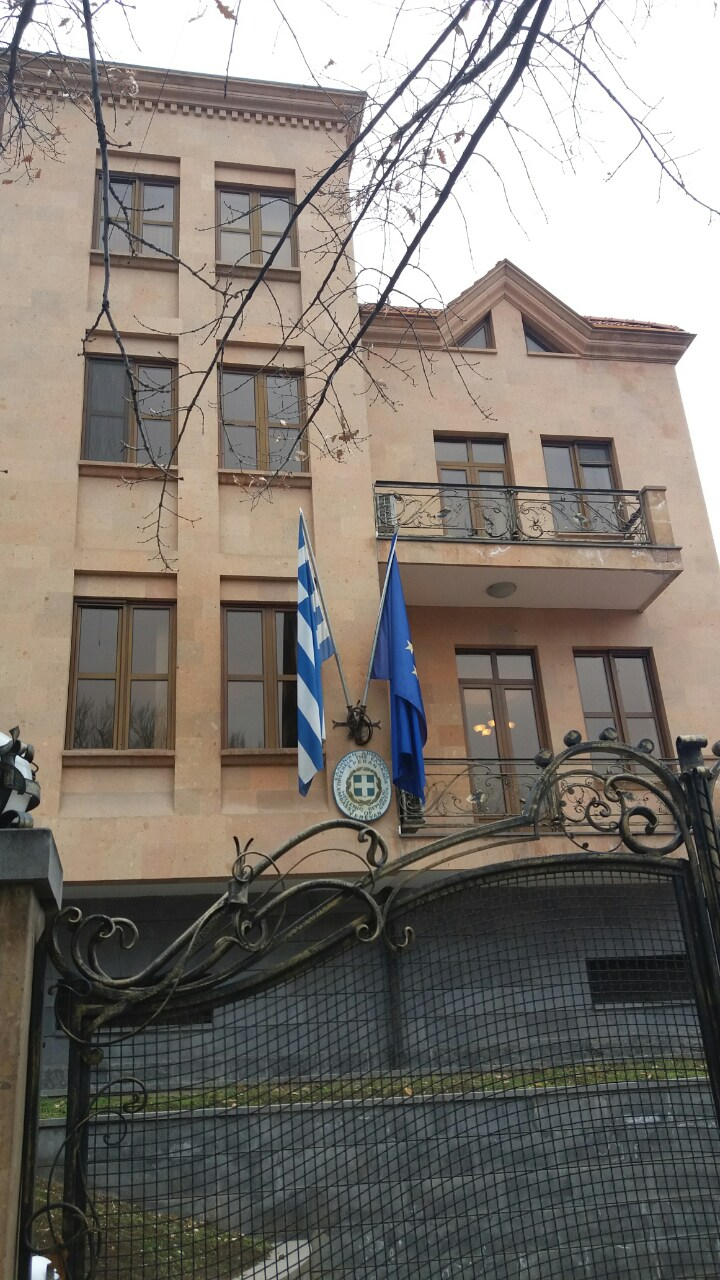
Embassy of Greece in Yerevan

== Country comparison ==
	Armenia	Greece
Coat of arms		
Population	2,956,900	10,718,565
Area	29,743 km^{2} (11,484 sq mi)	131,957 km^{2} (50,949 sq mi)
Population Density	101.5/km^{2} (262.9/sq mi)	82/km^{2} (212,4/sq mi)
Capital	Yerevan	Athens
Largest City	Yerevan – 1,083,600 (1,230,000 Metro)	Athens – 3,074,160 (3,737,550 Metro)
Government	Unitary parliamentary republic	Parliamentary republic
Official languages	Armenian	Greek
Current Leader	President Vahagn Khachaturyan; Prime Minister Nikol Pashinyan	President Konstantinos Tasoulas; Prime Minister Kyriakos Mitsotakis
Main religions	99% Christianity (Armenian Orthodoxy), 1% Yazidism	98% Christianity (Greek Orthodoxy), 1.3% Islam, 0.7% others (Greek Orthodox, ) 1. (Greek Orthodox, ) 1.
Ethnic groups	97.9% Armenians, 1.3% Yazidis, 0.5% Russians, 0.3% Others	93.76% Greeks, 4.32% Albanians, 0.39% Bulgarians, 0.23% Romanians, 0.18% Ukrainians, 0.14% Pakistani, 0.12% Russians, 0.12% Georgians, 0.09% Indians, 0.65% Others
GDP (nominal)	US$13.444 billion ($4,527 per capita)	US$194.376 billion ($18,168 per capita)
GDP (PPP)	$32.893 billion ($10,995 per capita)	$310.743 billion ($29,045 per capita)
Military expenditures	$634,000,000 (5.5% of GDP)	$4,389,000,000 (2.6% of GDP)
Military Troops	51,580	461,600
Labour Forces	1,380,405	4,647,524

== See also ==
- Foreign relations of Armenia
- Foreign relations of Greece
- Armenia-NATO relations
- Armenia-EU relations
  - Accession of Armenia to the EU
- Armenians in Greece
- Greeks in Armenia
- Armenian genocide recognition
