= Yaghdan =

Village in Lori, Armenia

Yaghdan Յաղդան
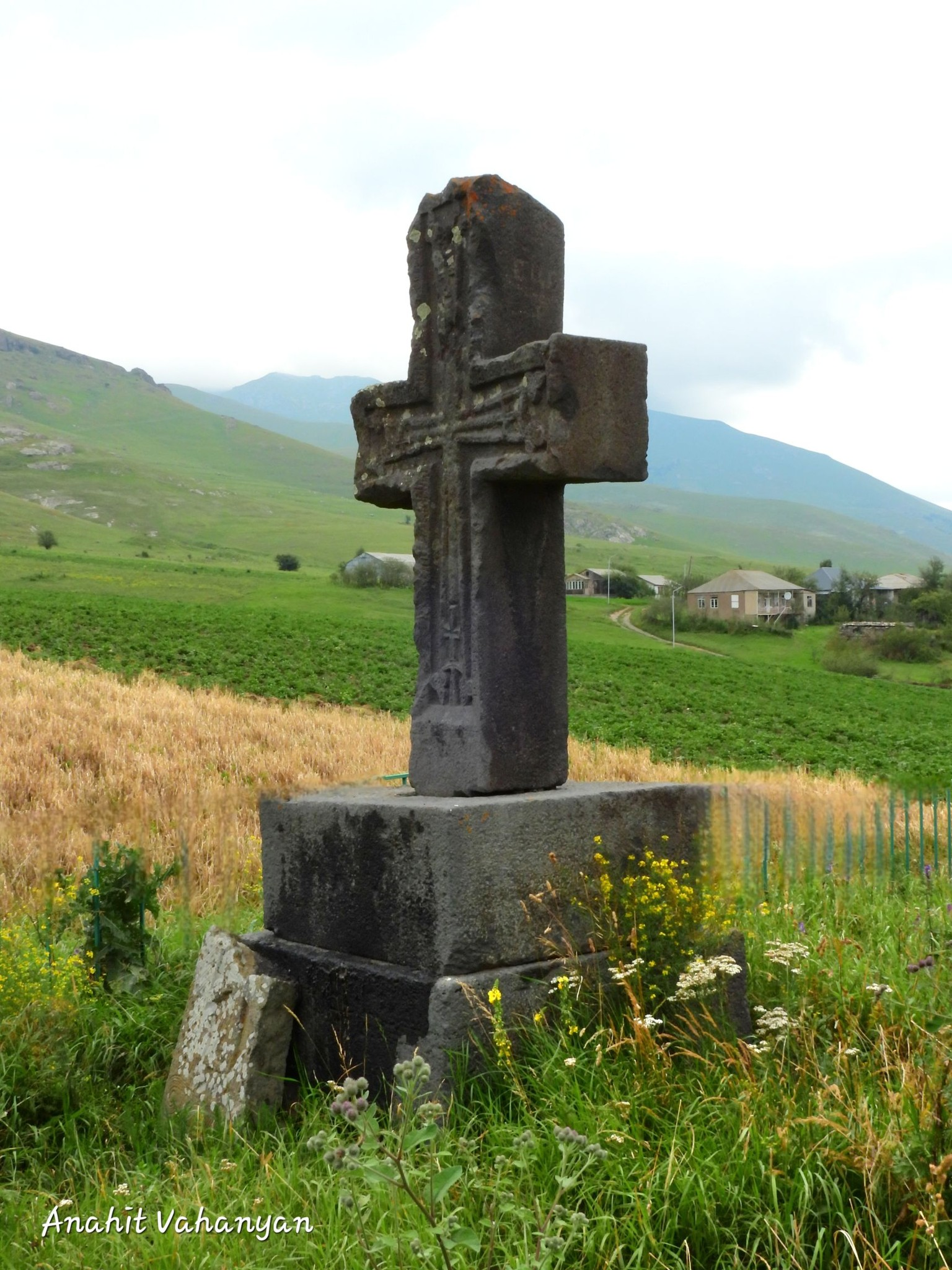

- Location within Armenia
- Coordinates: 41°00′33″N 44°30′30″E
- Country: Armenia
- Province: Lori
- Elevation: 1,350 m (4,430 ft)

Population (2011)
  - Total: 233
- Time zone: UTC+4 (AMT)

Yaghdan (Armenian: Յաղդան, Greek: Γιαγντάν) is a village in the Lori Province of Armenia.

== History ==
Until the 1988 Armenian earthquake the village had an ethnic Greek-majority population, in the aftermath of the earthquake some 300 children were taken to Greece. What was intended to be a temporary event initiated a permanent migration of most of the settlement's Greek population to Greece. Today, the Greeks that remain in Yaghdan are mostly of mixed Greek/Armenian heritage, and many of the former Greek homes lie empty.
