= Hankavan =

Hankavan Հանքավան
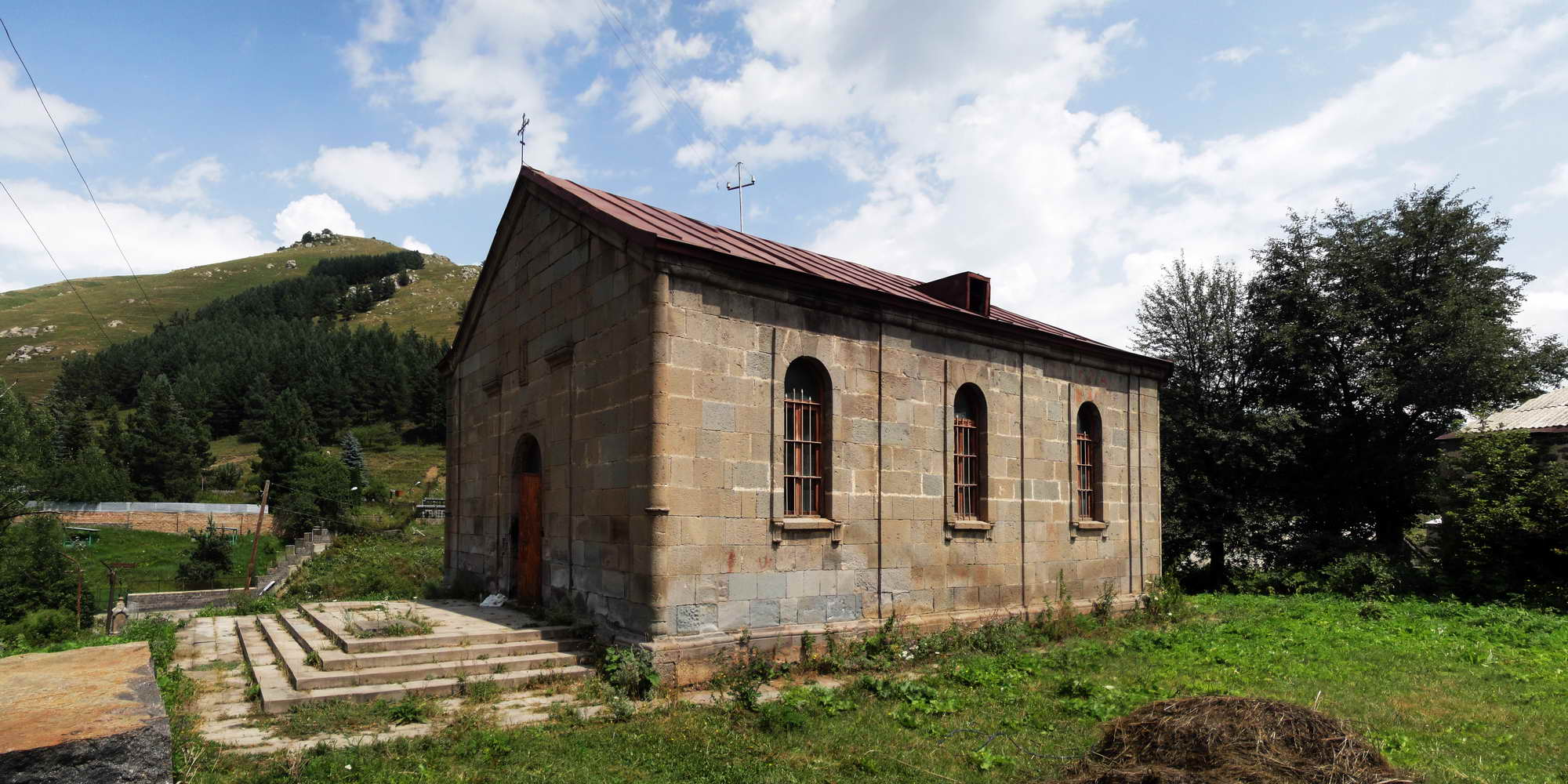
- Church in Hankavan

- Location within Armenia
- Coordinates: 40°38′39″N 44°28′53″E
- Country: Armenia
- Marz (Province): Kotayk
- Elevation: 1,990 m (6,530 ft)

Population (2011)
  - Total: 116
- Time zone: UTC+4 ( )

Hankavan (Armenian: Հանքավան) is a village and a summer resort in the Kotayk Province of Armenia along in the Marmarik River below the Pambak mountains range. It is notable for its mineral springs, which were used as part of a sanitarium industry during the Soviet period.

== Demographics ==
Hankavan is one of the last Greek communities in Armenia. At the village entrance there is a church and a graveyard to the left. The church was built by Greeks who immigrated from the Ottoman Empire in 1827. Graves date back to that time. Originally, seven families moved to this village, a number that grew to a thriving village of 250 families. What remains are about 50 families who trace their ancestry to the Greek mainland.

== Industry ==
A gold mine located in the village was recently sold for around $30 million.

== See also ==
- Kotayk Province
