= Azerbaijan–Greece relations =

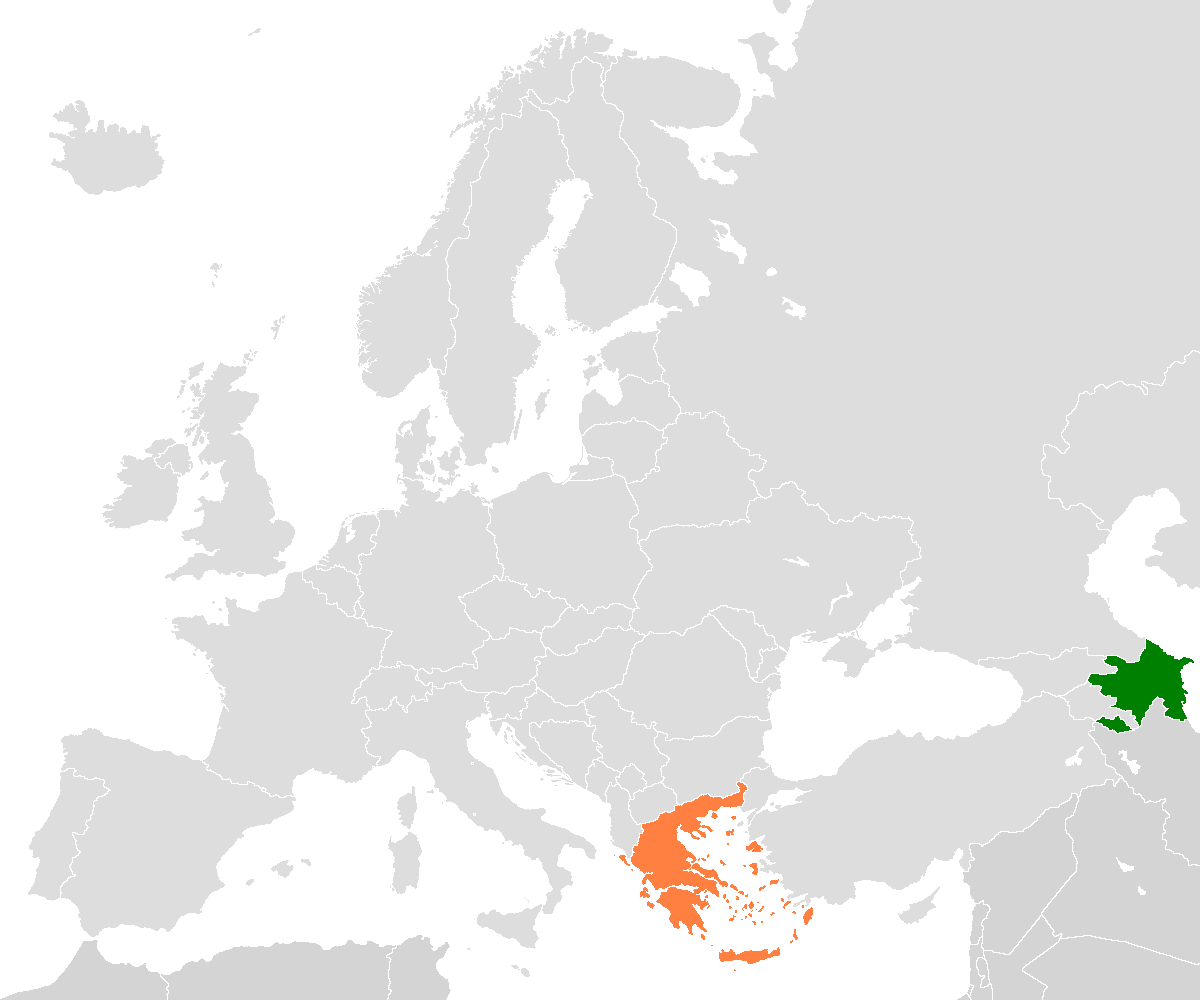

- Azerbaijan: Greece

Diplomatic mission
- Embassy of Azerbaijan, Athens: Embassy of Greece, Baku

Envoy
- Ambassador Arif Mammadov: Ambassador Christos Kapodistrias

In 1991, Azerbaijan regained independence from the Soviet Union, which was recognized by Greece on December 31, 1991. Diplomatic relations were established in 1992. The Greek embassy in Baku was opened in the spring of 1993. The embassy of Azerbaijan in Athens was opened in August 2004.

Both countries are full members of the Council of Europe, the Organization for Security and Co-operation in Europe (OSCE) and the Organization of the Black Sea Economic Cooperation (BSEC). Greece was the first European Union member country that wanted to directly import gas from Azerbaijan. Both countries enjoy recently-developed close relations in trade, culture, and economy. Greek diaspora in Azerbaijan is concentrated in Baku and numbers about 250-300 people, most of them are descendants of the Black Sea Greeks of Asia Minor who in the late 19th and early 20th centuries migrated to Azerbaijan.

However, because of the military partnership between Greece and Armenia and at the same time, the close ties and alliance between Turkey and Azerbaijan, relations between the two countries are distanced and there have been several nationalist tensions.

== Political relations ==
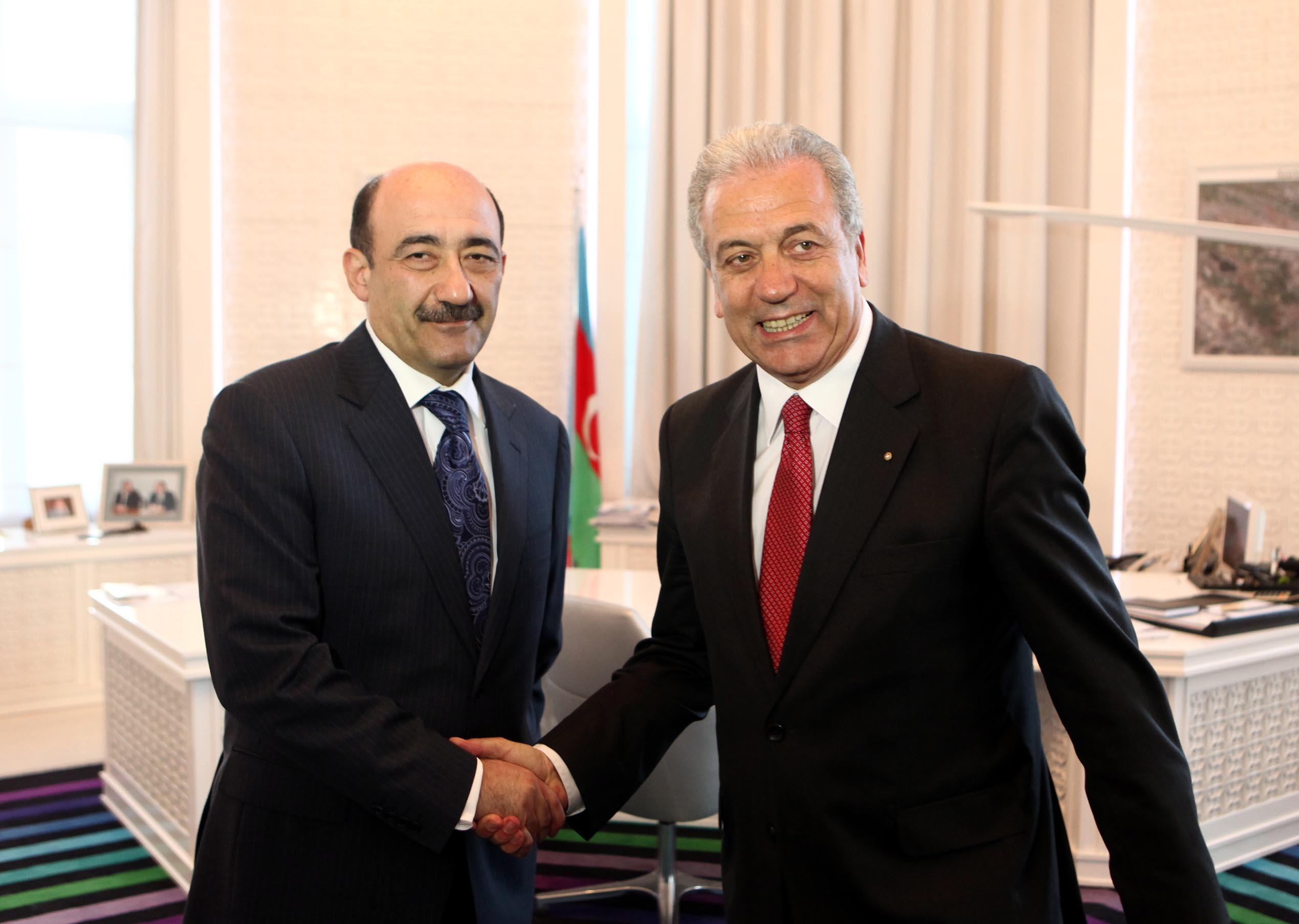
Foreign Minister of Greece Dimitris Avramopoulos (right) meeting with the Minister of Culture and Tourism of Azerbaijan Abulfas Garayev in April 2013

The nations of Azerbaijan and Greece each maintain bi-lateral, diplomatic relations. Each state maintains a full embassy, Azerbaijan in Athens and Greece in Baku. In February 2009, Azerbaijani President Ilham Aliyev visited Greece in order to boost bilateral relations. The leader met with Greek President Karolos Papoulias, as well as the Greek Prime Minister Costas Karamanlis. At the meeting between the officials, the two nations agreed that they must work more closely to get Azeri gas into Greece to help ease recent security issues.

== Economic relations ==
In the past the two nations have made many deals related to the oil industry. In 2007 Greek Development Minister Dimitris Sioufas signed a "memorandum of cooperation" in the sectors of natural gas and oil while in Baku. Sioufas referred to this memorandum as a "new page in economic and energy relations of the two countries."

=== Imports and exports ===
Imports of Azerbaijan
Year	Amount Thousands of USD
2020	13 662,53
2021	20 345,04 ▲
2022	28 372,57 ▲

Exports of Azerbaijan
Year	Amount Thousands of USD
2020	523 303,24
2021	415 415,95 ▼
2022	1 391 812,15 ▲

== Cooperation on Human rights ==
Greek MP Elsa Papadimitriou as Member of the Committee on Legal Affairs and Human Rights of the Parliamentary Assembly of the Council of Europe, visited Azerbaijan to her collaborator Oqtay Asadov the Chairman of Azeri Parliament and Justice Minister Fikrat Mammadov and head of the department for law enforcement Fuad Alasgarov. Finally she attended a seminar with the Chairman of the State Committee for Religious Organizations Hidayat Orujov.

== Tourism ==
In a meeting in New York City, Greek Foreign Minister Dimitris Avramopoulos expressed his interest to Elmar Mammadyarov in developing cooperation with Azerbaijan in the tourism sector. Azeri tourists to Greece rapidly grow, exceeding 225.000 in 2011, with the most popular destination being Santorini.

== Diplomacy ==
Republic of Azerbaijan

- Athens (Embassy)

Republic of Greece

- Baku (Embassy)

== See also ==
- Foreign relations of Azerbaijan
- Foreign relations of Greece
- Azerbaijan-NATO relations
- Azerbaijan–EU relations
- Greeks in Azerbaijan
- Azerbaijanis in Greece
