= Operation Golden Fleece =

Greek non-combatant evacuation operation in Abkhazia

- Part of War in Abkhazia (1992–1993)
- Type: Noncombatant Evacuation Operation
- Location: Sukhumi, Abkhazia; 43°00′12″N 41°00′55″E
- Commanded by: Vasilis Ntertilis
- Objective: Evacuate ethnic Greeks from Abkhazia
- Date: 15–18 August 1993
- Executed by: (Greece) Hellenic Navy
- Outcome: Evacuation of 1,013 civilians
- Casualties: 0
- Location within Abkhazia

Operation Golden Fleece (Greek: Επιχείρηση Χρυσόμαλλο Δέρας) is a codename given to the non-combatant evacuation operation of ethnic Greeks from the port of Sukhumi, Abkhazia. The War in Abkhazia, which began on 14 August 1992, created an atmosphere of lawlessness in the region, resulting in dozens of deaths of Greek civilians. The Greek state decided to intervene in order to evacuate members of the Greek minority in Abkhazia. The operation was carried out by the Hellenic Navy between 15–18 August 1993. It resulted in the evacuation of 1,013 civilians to Alexandroupolis, Greece.

== Background ==
=== Greek settlements in Georgia ===
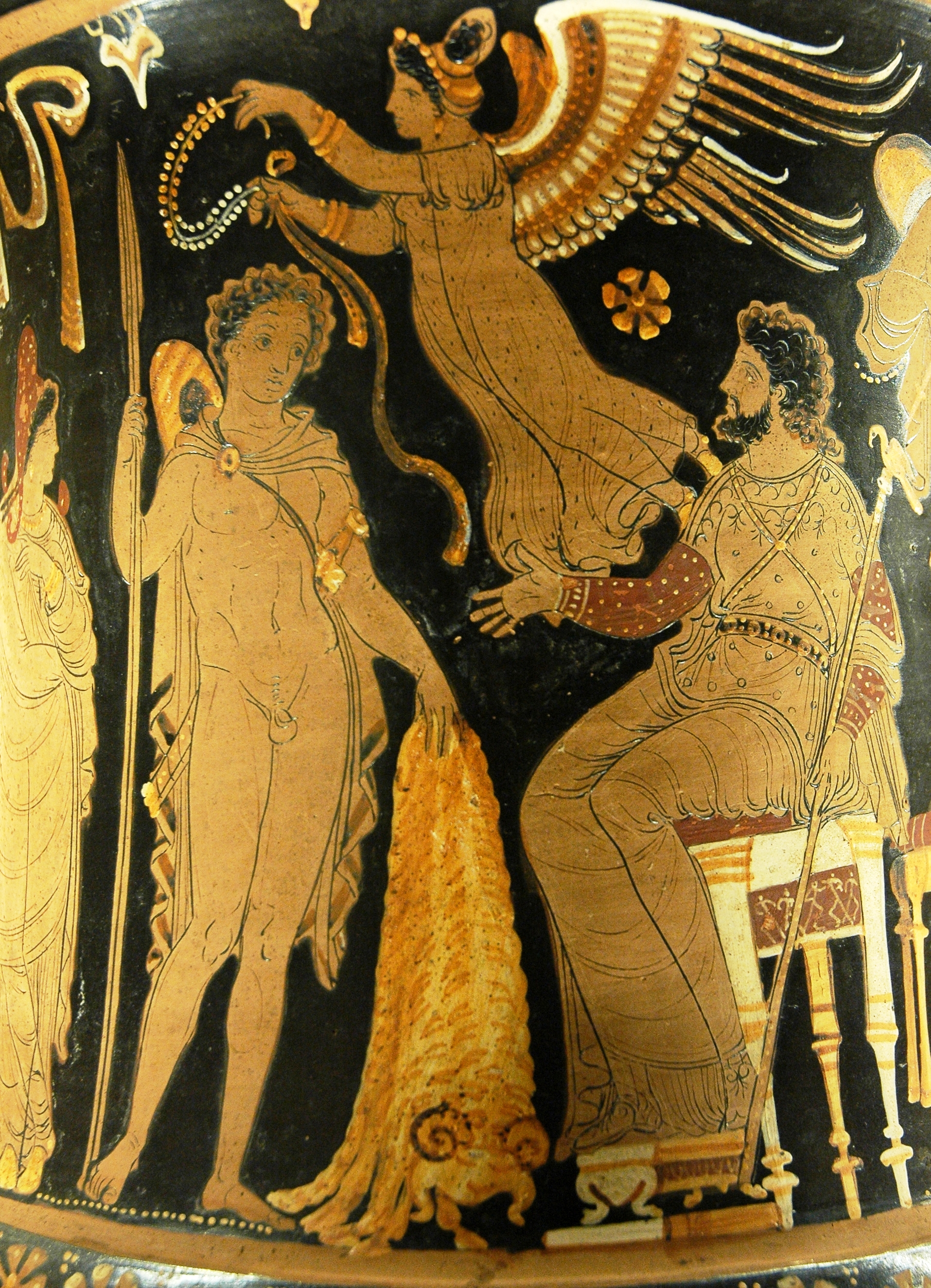
Jason holding the Golden Fleece

Greek ties with the Black Sea region date back to antiquity, as exemplified by the myths of Prometheus and the Argonauts’ quest to retrieve the Golden Fleece from Colchis. During the second Greek colonization period (the 7th to the 6th centuries BC), they founded 60 colonies on the Black Sea coast, Hellenizing some native populations. Greek immigration to the territory of modern Georgia continued in waves throughout the centuries most notably after the Fall of Constantinople, the Treaty of Adrianople (1829) and in the aftermath of the Greek genocide.

The Abkhaz ASSR was an autonomous region on the northwestern edge of Georgia. Multi-ethnic in its composition, until the 1930s it had an approximately even population of Georgians, Abkhazians, Russians, Greeks and Armenians. In 1949, Soviet authorities forcibly transferred Greek citizens of the Abkhaz ASSR they deemed disloyal to the Asian parts of the country. Some Greeks were allowed to return in 1959. In August 1992, the Greek minority in Abkhazia numbered 15,000 people, most of whom were returnees of the 1949 deportations.

=== Abkhazia conflict ===
Ethnic tensions between Abkhazians and Georgians flared up in the aftermath opening of a branch of Tbilisi State University in Sukhumi, which resulted in the 1989 Sukhumi riots. The power-sharing agreement was reached in 1991 under Georgian president Zviad Gamsakhurdia. However, The outbreak of civil war in Georgia emboldened Abkhazian separatists. In July 1992, the Abkhazian Supreme Council restored the 1925 Abkhazian constitution, effectively declaring sovereignty from Georgia. On 14 August 1992, Georgian troops entered Abkhazia to rescue Georgian officials taken hostage and protect the railway, but encountered resistance from Abkhaz militias.

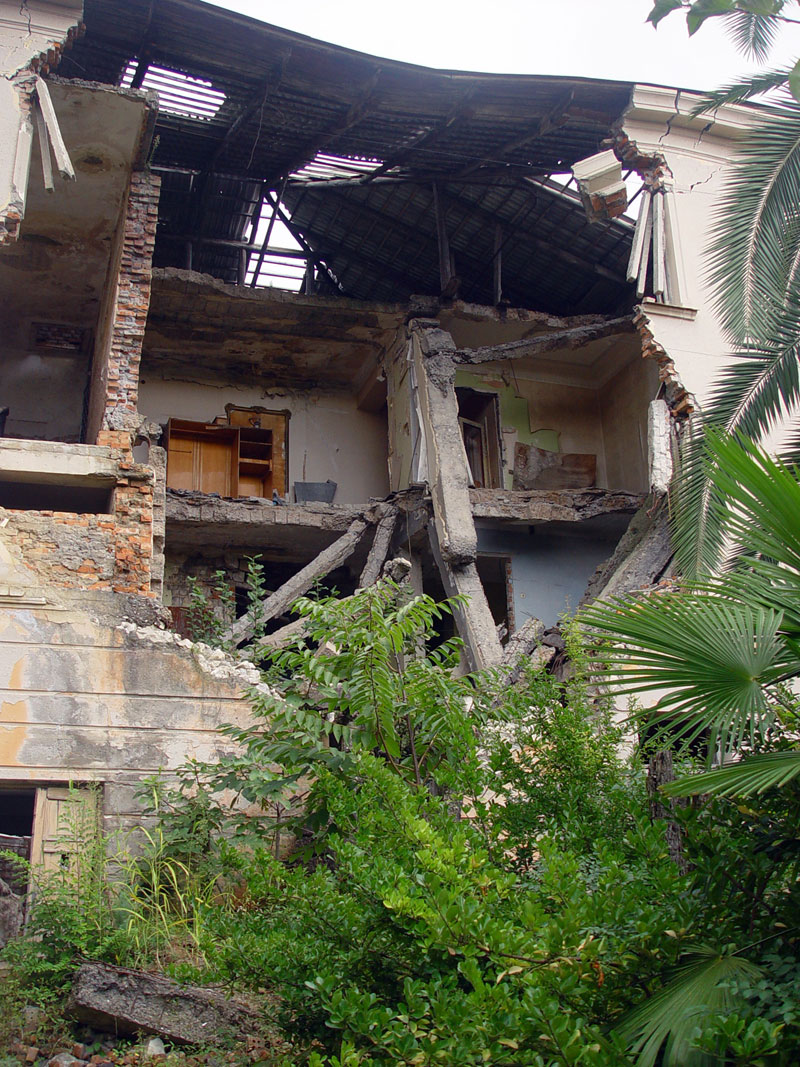
A house in central Sukhumi which was destroyed during clashes in 1992

By 18 August 1992, the Georgian army took control of a large part of Abkhazia, including Sukhumi. The Abkhazian separatist government was forced to evacuate to Gudauta. The separatists had gained the support of militants from the Confederation of Mountain Peoples of the Caucasus and the Russian military forces. The war created an atmosphere of lawlessness in the region. Refugees reported that artillery bombardments had damaged housing, while groups of bandits and rogue Georgian and Abkhazian soldiers operated with impunity. These criminal elements engaged in the robbery, murder and rape of civilians and ejected them from their houses. Russia and Israel immediately launched non-combatant evacuation operations for the members of their respective populations. The first Greek refugees fled to former Soviet states, mainly to southern Russia and then tried to migrate to Greece either legally or via travel visas.

During the course of the Battle of Sukhumi, 30 Greeks were killed by paramilitary organizations and 22 died as a result of artillery bombardments. Total Greek casualties across Abkhazia during the war may number over 200 dead, according to verbal statements from refugees.

=== Greece's involvement ===
During the Cold War, Greek foreign policy was focused on the Cyprus problem and its relations with its Balkan neighbors, while the Black Sea region was largely ignored. After hostilities broke out in August 1992, the Greek state failed to react quickly to the unfolding situation. Greek immigration authorities arrested and even deported refugees citing the fact that their residence permits had expired. On 1 November 1992, refugee organizations sent a protest note to the Greek government demanding the evacuation of ethnic Greek civilians from Abkhazia and the legalization of arriving refugees. Pontic Greek organizations launched demonstrations in Athens and Thessaloniki and petitioned Konstantinos Mitsotakis's government to evacuate the members of Greek community from Abkhazia. The largest demonstration took place in central Athens in April 1993 and involved 5,000 protesters. On 20 February 1993, representatives of the Greek minority in Russia and Georgia met with deputy Foreign Minister Virginia Tsouderou and demanded an intervention by the Greek state.

== Operation ==
In July 1993, Tsouderou ordered the evacuation of ethnic Greeks from Abkhazia. On 21 July, a diplomatic task force which included the Consul at the Embassy of Greece in Moscow Dionyssios Kalamvrezos (who had the political command and coordinated the operation), the Military Attaché at the Embassy, Colonel Georgios Kousoulis, the representative of the National Foundation for the Reception of Repatriated Greeks (EIYAPOE), Adamantios Mitsotakis and the staff member at the Embassy, Prodromos Teknopoulos, traveled from the Embassy of Greece in Moscow to Tbilisi and began planning Operation Golden Fleece. The task force made the decision to travel to Sukhumi, coordinate the evacuation with the local Greek community and to expedite the process of issuing Greek identity cards and exit permits to the evacuees. Fighting in the vicinity of Sukhumi prevented the diplomats from immediately proceeding to their destination. They visited Adjara and spoke with the head of the Greek community in Sochi, handing over documents to refugees who had fled to the two regions. On 31 July, the task force reached Sukhumi and established its headquarters in an inn guarded by a Russian paratrooper battalion.

An improvised embassy was established in a house in the center of the city. Greek diplomats then visited all the suburbs of Sukhumi and seven surrounding villages under an armed convoy of Georgian policemen. The task force collected the necessary documents to issue identity cards and surveyed the port to facilitate the evacuation. Power cuts and a night curfew complicated the operation and forced the Greek officials to work under candle light. On 9 August, Russian diplomats assured the Greek side that the paratroopers would assist in the evacuation if necessary. The same day, the private ferry Viscountes departed from the port of Piraeus for Sukhumi. Its civilian crew was supplemented by 20 soldiers from the Underwater Demolition Command, two Hellenic Navy doctors and three nurses dressed in civilian clothing. On 12 August, 11 Greek military policemen led by Captain Vasilis Ntertilis (who had command of the operation) arrived in Sukhumi from Georgia and finalized the evacuation plan which was approved by Georgian authorities.

At some point, Viscountes was stopped by an Abkhazian improvised patrol boat whose crew boarded her. After brief negotiation and a bribe of cigarettes, the rebels allowed the ship to continue to its destination. At 5 am on 15 August, the military police team secured the only entrance to the harbor. Viscountes anchored in the port of Sukhumi several hours later. After unloading 14 tons of humanitarian aid, its crew began processing the refugees who had gathered in the harbor. Greek navy personnel often had to intervene, verbally driving away unidentified armed men who tried to meddle into the crowd of the evacuees. By 5 pm, a total of 1,013 people boarded the ship which departed for Greece an hour later. No casualties were reported during the course of the operation. Gunshots and grenade explosions were heard by the ship's crew shortly after its departure. The commander of the Abkhazian Navy, Ali Aliyev, ordered his troops to allow the Greek ship safe passage. Viscountes reached Alexandroupolis on 18 August, where all the refugees disembarked.

== Aftermath ==
Some 1,484 Greeks chose not to take part in the evacuation, either because they believed that hostilities were on the verge of ending or because they did not wish to abandon their properties. They either remained in Abkhazia or were temporarily displaced to Georgia or Russia. On 27 September 1993, Sukhumi was captured by the Abkhazians, leading to many civilian casualties; including victims from the Greek minority. By 30 September, Abkhazian rebels had pushed Georgian troops out of most of Abkhazia; ultimately winning the war. After the fall of Sukhumi, Abkhazian president Vladislav Ardzinba called upon the refugees to return and "help rebuild the country"; he also appointed two ethnic Greeks into his cabinet of ministers.

At the time, Operation Golden Fleece was the largest and most complex humanitarian mission carried out by the Greek state beyond its borders. Its success boosted the Greek government's prestige on the international diplomatic arena and among the Greek diaspora.

== Sources ==
- Agtzidis, Vlasis (1993). Ο πόλεμος στην Αμπχαζία και οι συνέπειές του στην ελληνική κοινότητα [The war in Abkhazia and its consequences on the Greek community]. Athens: Hellenic Ministry of Foreign Affairs Report.
- Avidza, Aslan (2013). Проблемы военно-политической истории Отечественной войны в Абхазии (1992-1993 гг.) [Issues of the military-political history of the Patriotic War in Abkhazia (1992-1993)] (in Russian). Vol. II. Sukhumi: Abkhaz Institute of Humanitarian Research.
- Kalamvrezos, Dionysios (1997). "Μικρό Χρονικό της Επιχείρησης Χρυσόμαλλο Δέρας" [A Short Chronicle of the Operation Golden Fleece]. In Agtzidis, Vlasis (ed.). Οι Άγνωστοι Έλληνες του Πόντου [The Unknown Greeks of Pontus] (in Greek). Etairia Meletis Ellinikis Istorias. pp. 253–259. ISBN 978-8-88-888355-7.
- Kalamvrezos, Dionysios (2015). Ο ελληνισμός και οι εξελίξεις στη Ρωσία και στις άλλες χώρες της τ. ΕΣΣΔ μετά το 1991: κρίσεις, ελληνικές παρεμβάσεις, προοπτικές [The greek diaspora in Russia and other countries of the former USSR after 1991: crises, Greek policies, prospects] (PhD thesis) (in Greek). National and Kapodistrian University of Athens. pp. 1–626.
- Karagiannis, Emmanuel (2013). "Greek Foreign Policy toward the Black Sea Region: Combining Hard and Soft Power". Mediterranean Quarterly. 24 (3): 74–101. doi:10.1215/10474552-2339471.
- Kotsionis, Panagiotis (2006). Λαοί και πολιτισμοί στην πρώην Σοβιετική ένωση. Η Ελληνική Παρουσία [People and Cultures in the former Soviet Union. The Greek Presence] (in Greek). Athens: typothito - Giorgos Dardanos. ISBN 960-8041-04-X.
- O'Ballance, Edgar (1996). Wars in the Caucasus, 1990–95. London: Palgrave Macmillan. ISBN 978-0-333-67100-9.
