= Greeks in Azerbaijan =

The Greeks in Azerbaijan have not formed a large community in comparison to those in neighbouring Georgia and Armenia. It was composed mainly of Pontic Greek immigrants from the Ottoman Empire.

== History ==
=== Under the Russian Empire ===
Initially, these immigrants arrived in the 1830s and settled in the village of Mehmana on the banks of the Tartar river. On 23 May 1830, the Georgian exarch appointed archpriest Vasily Andrianov to lead the religious community of Mehmana.

In 1851, Trebizond-born Charalambos Koundourov (locally known as Usta Allahverdi) built two copper smelteries near Ordubad where the core staff consisted of Greek labourers. Ten years later, a school and a church for the Greek community were built there as well. The church was headed by Nikolaos Lavos. Koundourov's sons owned the smelteries after his death until the October Revolution.

Local Greeks were also prominent in architecture and construction. The Saint Nicholas Church in Baku and an Orthodox church in Altiaghaj were designed and built in the 1850s by Greek architects and contractors.

Greeks had not started immigrating to Baku, the present-day capital of Azerbaijan, until the oil boom of the late nineteenth and early twentieth centuries. Statistical records from 1886 revealed no Greek population in the Baku Governorate, but the picture changed in 1897 when the census indicated 278 Greeks in the Baku Governorate and 658 in the Elisabethpol Governorate (compared to 102 in 1886). The immigrants consisted mainly of general labourers and retailers and included both Turkish citizens and natives of the Greek settlements elsewhere in the Caucasus.

In 1907, the city of Baku alone had an estimated Greek population of 800, most of whom had immigrated from Asia Minor and therefore could not execute religious services in Russian Orthodox churches where the working languages were Old Church Slavonic and Russian. Thus the Greek Benevolent Society of Baku received a permission to construct a Greek Orthodox church in Baku. The number of Greeks in Baku did not change much according to the 1917 official statistical data. According to Russian ethnographist Andrei Popov, there were 2,161 Greeks living in eight cities and villages across the Governorates of Baku and Elisabethpol as of 1919.

=== Soviet period ===
Historical population
| Year | Pop. | ±% |
|---|---|---|
| 1939 | 1,248 | — |
| 1959 | 839 | −32.8% |
| 1970 | 820 | −2.3% |
| 1979 | 648 | −21.0% |
| 1989 | 583 | −10.0% |
According to official census data:

Another wave of Greek immigration took place in the aftermath of World War I and the establishment of Soviet rule in Baku in 1920. By 1923, Azerbaijan's Greek population rose to over 1,000, of which 58 people lived in the pioneer settlement of Mehmana. The building of the Greek philanthropic association located on Millionnaya Street (presently Amirov Street) in Baku housed an amateur Greek theatre, a church, a library and a primary school which had 89 students in 1921. There was a community football club named Embros.

Nearly a third of Azerbaijan's Greek population chose to retain foreign citizenship. By 1937, 95% of foreign citizens residing in Azerbaijan were Greeks. This factor, as well as the Soviet Union's changing attitude toward its Greek population led to Greeks of Baku being a target of repression and forced relocation. In 1937–1938, many members of the community were arrested and some later executed. Among the victims was actress Pamphylia Tanailidi. By 1939, with the help of the Greek embassy in the USSR, most foreign citizens of Greek origin left Baku for Greece. Two more waves of repression resulting in relocation to Central Asia and Siberia targeted Greeks of Azerbaijan with Soviet citizenship and took place in 1942 and 1949 respectively, as part of the Bolshevik campaign of "clearing the Caucasus from the politically untrustworthy elements."

=== Since independence ===
Following the collapse of the Soviet Union, in the midst of political instability over 100 of the remaining Greeks left Azerbaijan. The Greek population of the village of Mehmana fled during the First Nagorno-Karabakh War. In 1994, a Greek cultural centre was established in Baku at the initiative of the Greek ambassador. In 1997, it was reorganized into the Argo Greek Society. The community, which has largely lost the Pontic language, presently numbers 535 people, both Greeks and descendants of mixed families.

== See also ==
- Azerbaijan–Greece relations
- Greek diaspora
- Ethnic groups in Azerbaijan
- Greeks in Armenia
- Greeks in Georgia
- Greeks in Russia
- Greeks in Turkey
