= Greeks in Georgia =

Ethnic group in Georgia

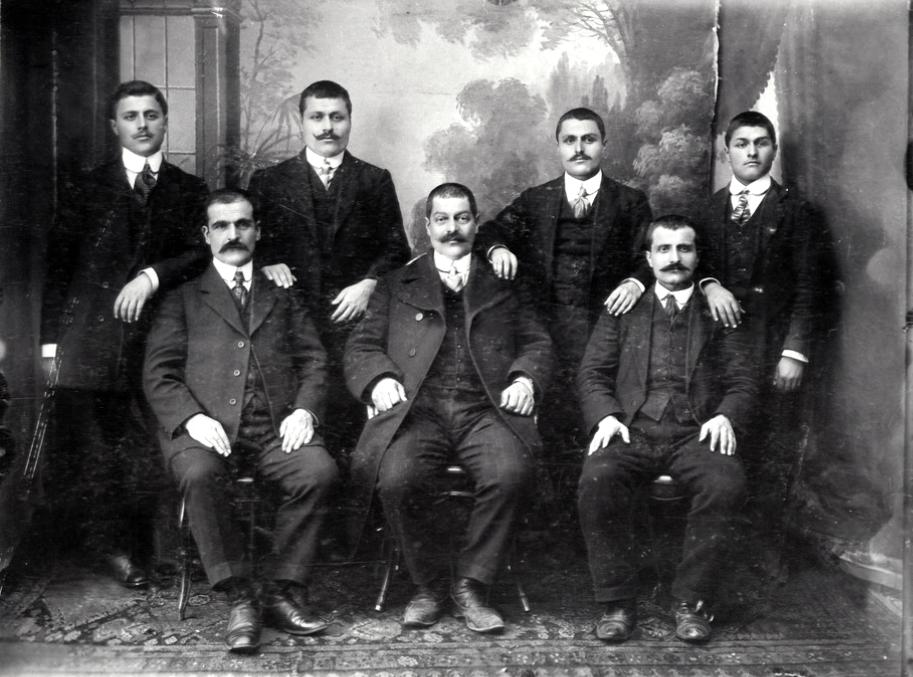
- Pontic Greeks in Batumi in the early 20th century

Total population
- 5,544 (2014, census)

The population of Greeks in Georgia (Georgian: ბერძნები საქართველოში, romanized: berdznebi sakartveloshi; Greek: Έλληνες στην Γεωργία, romanized: Éllines stin Georgía), which in academic circles is often considered part of the broader, historic community of Pontic Greeks or—more specifically in this region—Caucasus Greeks, is estimated at between 15,000 and 20,000 people to 100,000 (15,166 according to the latest census) down from about 100,000 in 1989. The community has dwindled due to the large wave of repatriation to Greece as well as emigration to Russia, and in particular Stavropol Krai in the North Caucasus region of southern Russia. The community has established the Union of Greeks in Georgia and there is a cultural centre and a newspaper entitled Greek Diaspora.

== History ==
=== Antiquity and Medieval eras ===
Greek population 6th century BC

The Greek presence in Georgia, specifically in its western part (ancient Colchis), is attested to the 7th century BC, as part of the Old Greek Diaspora and has traditionally been concentrated in the Black Sea coast. According to one version, which nowadays doesn't enjoy much currency, the English name of the country (which is called Sakartvelo in Georgian) is Greek in origin and means agriculture. The Greeks are known as Berdzeni (ბერძენი) in Georgian, a unique exonym, deriving from the Georgian word for "wise," a name commonly attributed to the notion that philosophy was born in Greece. Medieval Georgians customarily applied this name to the Byzantines. Greek artists, artisans, and Greek Orthodox clergymen were frequently seen in medieval Georgia. There was also a high degree of intermarriages between noble families, and several Georgian aristocratic houses, such as the Andronikashvili, claimed Pontic Greek descent.

=== Ottomans ===
Far more significant in increasing the Greek presence in Georgia was the settlement there of Pontic Greeks and Eastern Anatolia Greeks. Large-scale Pontic Greek settlement in Georgia followed the Ottoman conquest of the Empire of Trebizond in 1461, when Greek refugees from the eastern Black Sea coastal districts, the Pontic Alps, and then Eastern Anatolia fled or migrated to neighbouring Georgia and established the early nucleus of those later defined as Caucasus Greeks. These Pontic Greeks and their descendants who settled in Medieval Georgia often intermarried with their fellow-Eastern Orthodox Georgians and with those local Armenians and Ossetians who were mainly Oriental Orthodox, as well as with later waves of Greek refugees and Russian settlers following the annexation of Georgia by the Russian Empire in 1801. However, it is difficult to verify the numbers of all such waves of Pontic Greeks from the Pontic Alps region to Georgia and the South Caucasus in general between circa 1520 and 1800, which according to Anthony Bryer is the most obscure period in the history of Pontus and the Pontic Greeks, owing to the scarcity of contemporary Greek and Ottoman Turkish sources on the subject.

Modern historians suggest that following the Ottoman conquest of 1461, many, if not most Pontic Greeks retreated up into the highlands, where it was easier to maintain their culture and freedom from the encroachments of the Ottoman authorities. This movement was reinforced in the early 1600s by the growing power along the coastal valleys districts of the derebeys ('valley lords'), which further encouraged Pontic Greeks to retreat away from the coast deeper into the highlands and up onto the eastern Anatolian plateau, before some moved further east into the neighbouring Lesser Caucasus around Kars and southern Georgia. Modern historians also suggest that a major migratory movement of Pontic Greeks onto the eastern Anatolian plateau and the Lesser Caucasus occurred in the reign of Sultan Mehmed IV (1648–1687), during which a common pattern was initiated in Ottoman history: the Ottomans and their clients the Crimean Tatars suffered a string of severe defeats at the hands of the expansionist Russian Empire and followed this up with a wave of repression against the Greeks of both the southern Balkans and the Pontic Alps region, on the pretext that Greek statesmen and traders had colluded with the Tsar. As a result, many Pontic Greeks felt pressured into following their cousins who had left Pontus as refugees in previous generations, and so they too decided to migrate to southern Russia or neighbouring Georgia and the South Caucasus.

However, the pre-19th century presence of Pontic Greeks in Georgia was complicated by the fact that following the Ottoman conquest of Georgia in 1578 during Lala Mustafa Pasha's Caucasian campaign many Greek Muslims (usually Pontic Greeks from northeastern Anatolia who had "turned Turk") settled in the country as representatives of Ottoman authority. These islamized and turkicized Pontic Greeks generally either assimilated into Georgia's Turkish-/Azeri-speaking population (such as those later defined as Meskhetian Turks, many of whom were actually of islamized Georgian origin), emigrated as refugees back into Anatolia following the Russian annexation of Georgia in 1801, or reverted to their Greek Orthodoxy following the annexation and reintegrated into the country's other Christian communities, including those in the South Caucasus region later defined as Caucasus Greeks.

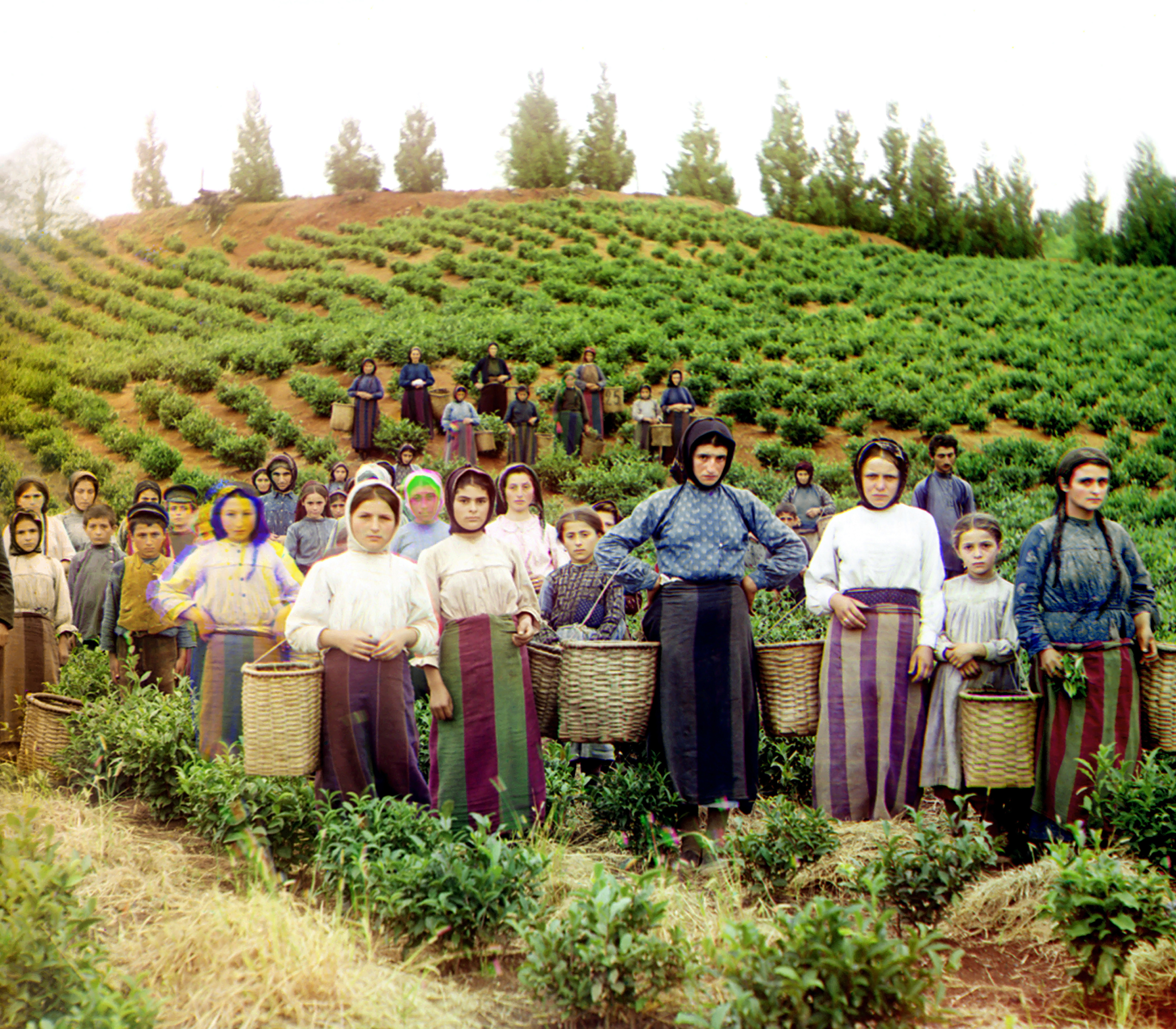
Ethnic Greek women and children harvesting tea in Chakva, Georgia, between 1905 and 1915. Photograph by Sergei Mikhailovich Prokudin-Gorskii

However, the largest number of Pontic Greeks who settled in Georgia according to widely attested documentary evidence did so in the early modern period and first half of the 19th century. In 1763, 800 Greek households from the Ottoman Empire’s Gümüşhane Province were transplanted by King Heraclius II of Georgia to develop silver and lead mining at Akhtala and Alaverdi (now in Armenia). Their descendants survive in Georgia's Marneuli district. The next major movement into Georgia of Pontic Greeks fleeing Ottoman repression occurred following the Greek War of Independence. Many of these were the Christian, but largely Turcophone Greeks known as Tsalka Greeks, who mainly speak the Tsalka language and who settled in the latter-day Tsalka district on the territory of the depopulated medieval Georgian province of Trialeti, then part of the Russian Empire. But the largest wave that is widely attested and also traditionally cited by many Greeks in Georgia themselves, was that of Pontic Greeks from the regions of Gümüşhane and Erzurum who had fled with their families to avoid likely Turkish reprisals following the withdrawal of the Russian army, which many of them had welcomed or collaborated with during its occupation of eastern Anatolia in the Russo-Turkish War of 1828–1829. These later waves of Pontic Greek refugees generally settled in villages in southern Georgia, where the main centres Armenian settlement were also concentrated, and assimilated into the preexisting Pontic Greek refugee communities that had already established themselves in the country between the late-15th and late-18th centuries.

When these later migrants and refugees settled in Georgia they naturally assimilated through intermarriage with the smaller nucleus of Pontic Greeks settled there in the post-Byzantine and Ottoman period, as well as with the other Christian communities in the country, particularly with their fellow Greek Orthodox Georgians and Russians, and to a lesser extent also with those Ossetians and Armenians who were Oriental Orthodox. But because of the prestige and domineering nature of Byzantine and Christian Greek culture, these Pontic Greek communities tenaciously maintained their Greek culture and identity and their use of the Pontic Greek language, generally disregarding the language and culture of any other non-Hellenic but Christian ethnic groups of Georgia and the South Caucasus they had intermarried with, with the exception of Russian, which the Pontic Greeks of Georgia had had to learn for official and everyday purposes in the Russian Empire period.

The Pontic Greek refugees also settled in the former Russian Caucasus province of Kars Oblast following the Russian empire's acquisition of a large area of northeastern Anatolia from the Ottoman Empire in 1878, and also along Georgia's Black Sea coastline, where they formed a substantial and active community in the maritime towns. Many of these Caucasus Greeks who settled in the now Russian-controlled province of Kars Oblast had actually come from the communities settled in Georgia rather than directly from their ancestral homes in northeastern Anatolia. They were settled in Kars Oblast as a part of a planned Russian policy to Christianize a hitherto largely Muslim province, from which many Muslims had abandoned their lands following the Russian conquest and resettled in Ottoman territory. By 1989, the largest Greek communities of Georgia were concentrated in Tsalka, Tbilisi, and Abkhazia, comprising 38.6%, 21.6% and 14.6% of all Georgian Greeks, respectively. Although Georgians and Greeks share many cultural traits, the Greek community of Georgia became more integrated with the Russians in the later centuries of the Russian empire and during the Soviet era. Many of them attended Russian schools, and spoke Russian as their secondary or even primary language, and frequently intermarried with partners of Russian origin. The post-Soviet civil strife and economic crisis forced many Greeks to emigrate abroad permanently, or on seasonal works. As a result, their number dropped to 15.166 (3,792 of them living in Tbilisi) as of the 2002 Georgia census (which does not include the data from a large part of breakaway Abkhazia).

Historical population
| Year | Pop. | ±% |
|---|---|---|
| 1939 | 84,636 | — |
| 1959 | 72,938 | −13.8% |
| 1970 | 89,246 | +22.4% |
| 1979 | 95,105 | +6.6% |
| 1989 | 100,324 | +5.5% |
| 2002 | 15,166 | −84.9% |

Sokhumi once had the Greek names Sevastopolis and Dioskurias, however the Greek population of Abkhazia dates mostly from the Ottoman-Russian wars of the 19th century. They consisted mostly of Pontic Greeks from the southeast corner of the Black sea known as the Pontus near the ancient city of Trebizond. The Soviet authorities referred to them as greki, although in their own Greek dialect they called themselves Romaioi, meaning they were descendants of the Roman empire of Byzantium.

=== Twentieth century ===
After World War II, ethnic Greeks of the Abkhaz ASSR were deported from 1949-1950 on the order of Joseph Stalin who referred to them as "stateless cosmopolitans". They were allowed to return in the late 1950s, however their number never reached pre-deportation level.

Most of the Greeks fled Abkhazia (mostly to Greek Macedonia and Southern Russia) during and after the 1992–1993 war so that their number dropped from 14,664 in 1989 to just 1,486 in 2003. Greece carried out a humanitarian operation, Operation Golden Fleece, evacuating 1,015 Greeks who had decided to abandon their homes in Abkhazia on August 15, 1993.

Until thirty years ago Greeks made up 70% of the 30,000 strong population of the Georgian city of Tsalka and villages in the surrounding plateau. Many of these were actually Turkish-speaking but Eastern Orthodox Greeks referred to as Urums. Today only about 2,000 of the Tsalka Greeks remain, mostly elderly, as most chose to migrate to Greece, and in particular to Greek Macedonia in Northern Greece. Many Greek Georgians returning to the country for Greek Easter find their homes looted or occupied by squatters, mostly immigrants from other regions of the country, who refuse to allow them entry. Consequently, the number of Greeks returning to Georgia has decreased. Some have claimed that the difficulties they face in reclaiming the homes are part of a deliberate attempt by the Georgian government to uproot the community in favour of ethnic Georgians. Instances of violence, related to the above have sometimes resulted in the death of elderly Greeks while more have been injured. The Georgian government had to twice dispatch a Special Forces unit to prevent further outbreaks of inter-communal violence. In 2005 the Council of Greeks in Georgia has appealed to the World Council of Hellenes, SAE, registering their fear caused by the increasing instances of previously rare ethnic violence against them. The matter was also discussed in the parliament of Greece.

== See also ==
- Georgians in Greece
- Saberdzneti
- Georgia–Greece relations
- Pontic Greeks
- Caucasus Greeks
- Greeks in Armenia
- Greeks in Azerbaijan
- Pontic Greek (language)
- Georgian Byzantine-Rite Catholics
- Greeks in Russia
- Greeks in Turkey
- Greek Diaspora
- Urums
