= Mehmana =

Mehmana Մէհմանա Μεχμανά
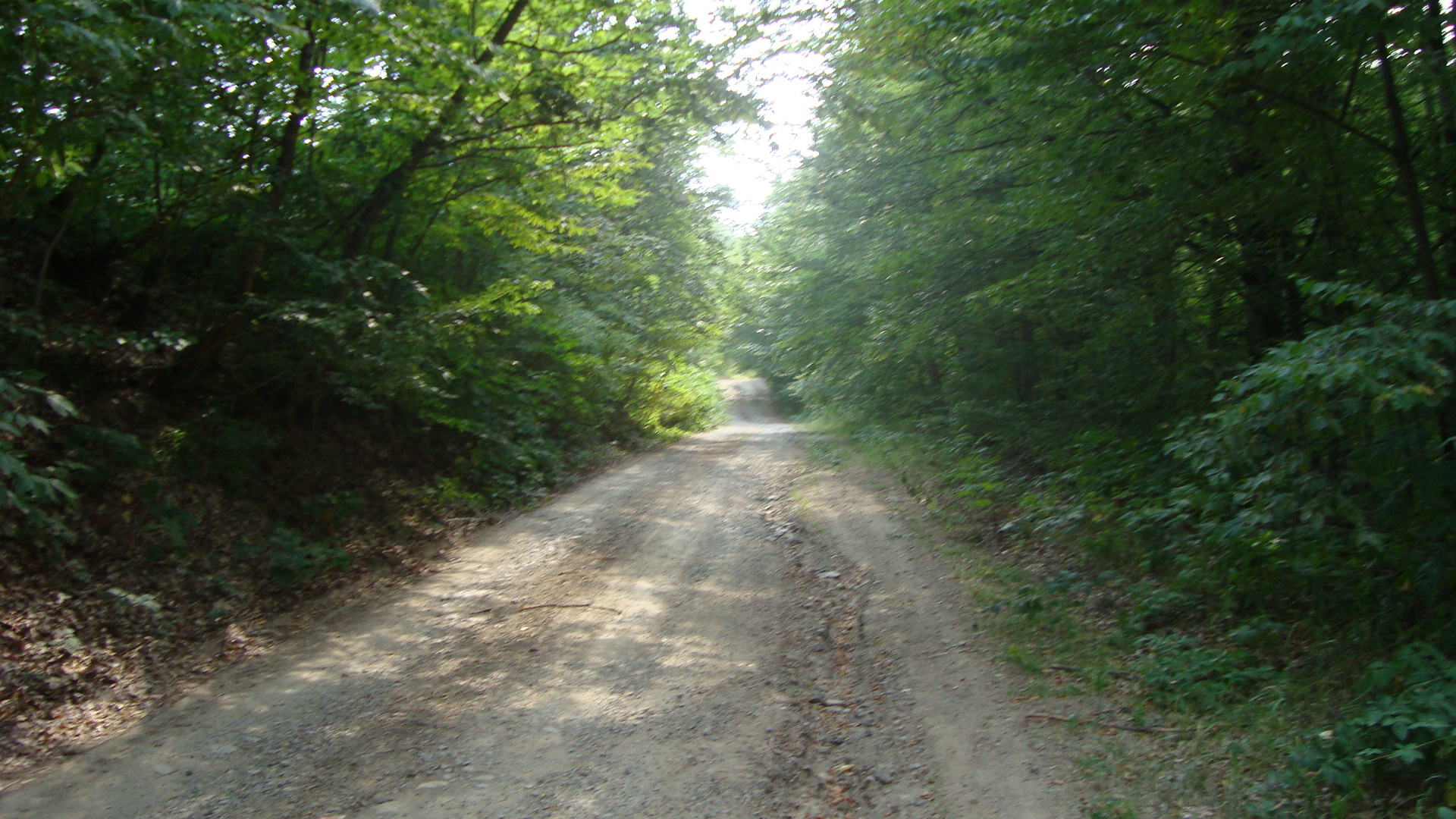

- Location within Azerbaijan Location within East Zangezur Economic Region
- Coordinates: 40°09′10″N 46°40′09″E
- Country: Azerbaijan
  - District: Aghdara

Population (2015)
  - Total: 26
- Time zone: UTC+4 (AZT)

Mehmana (Armenian: Մեհմանա, Greek: Μεχμανά) is a village located in the Aghdara District of Azerbaijan, in the region of Nagorno-Karabakh. Until 2023 it was controlled by the breakaway Republic of Artsakh. The village had an ethnic Armenian-majority population until the expulsion of the Armenian population of Nagorno-Karabakh by Azerbaijan following the 2023 Azerbaijani offensive in Nagorno-Karabakh.

== History ==
Metal ore has historically been mined in the area of the village, including silver and lead. From the beginning of the 19th century, Pontic Greeks from present-day Turkey settled in Mehmana, with many coming to mine the ore found in the area.

During the Soviet period, the village was part of the Mardakert District of the Nagorno-Karabakh Autonomous Oblast. During the First Nagorno-Karabakh War, the village was captured by Azerbaijani forces during the Mardakert and Martuni Offensives, and was almost completely destroyed, with the population fleeing and many moving to Greece. After the war, Artsakh rebuilt six houses in the village. As of 2010, only one Greek resident remains in Mehmana.

== Historical heritage sites ==
Historical heritage sites in and around the village include tombs from the 2nd–1st millennia BCE, a 12th/13th-century cemetery, the church of Surb Astvatsatsin (Armenian: Սուրբ Աստվածածին, lit. 'Holy Mother of God') built in 1228, the Panaya Church (Armenian: Պանայա Եկեղեցի) built in 1249, and a 13th-century khachkar.

== Economy and culture ==
The population is mainly engaged in agriculture and animal husbandry. As of 2015, the village has a municipal building, and an aid station.

== Demographics ==
The village had 27 inhabitants in 2005, and 26 inhabitants in 2015.

== Gallery ==
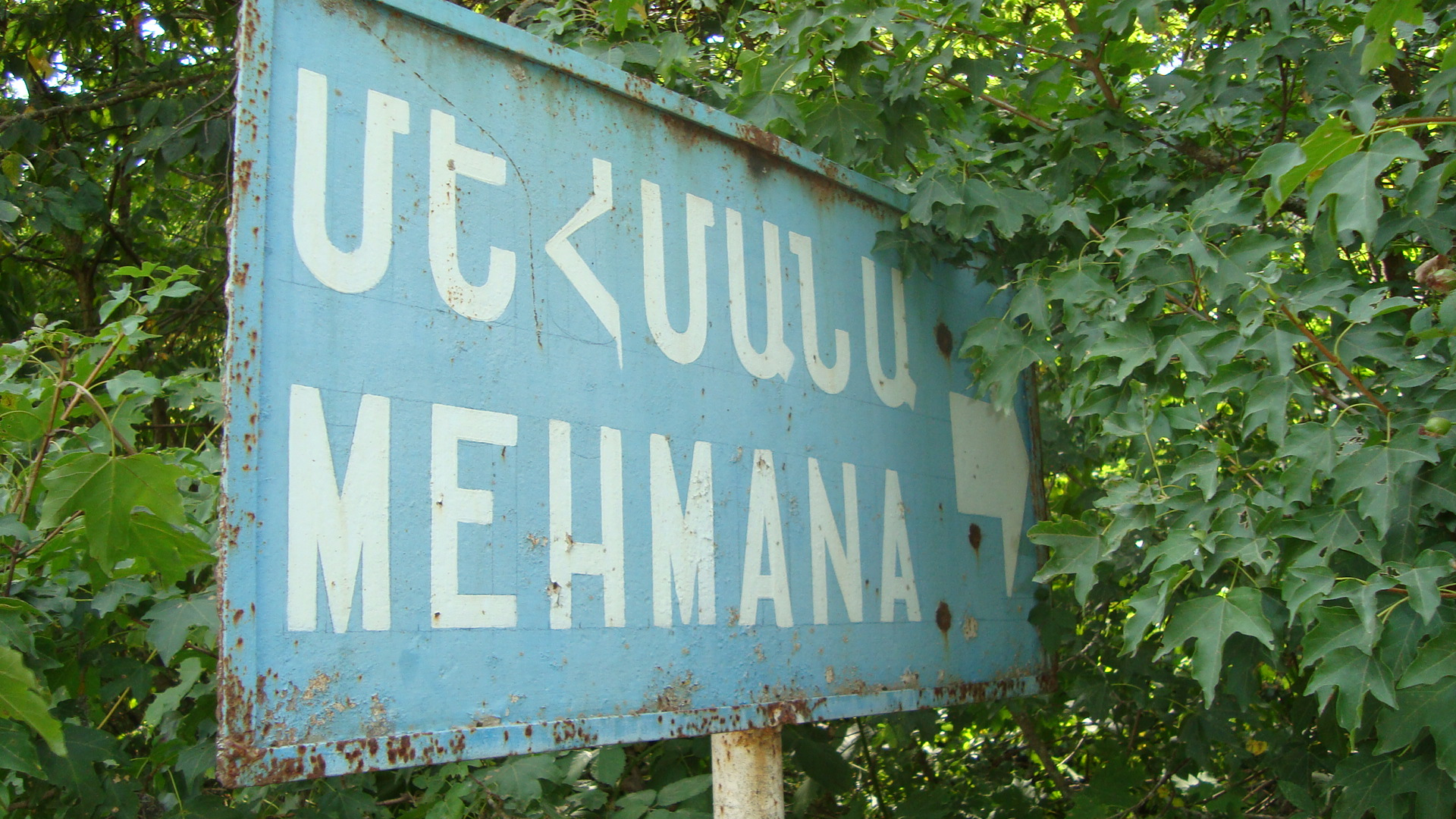
Sign reading "Mehmana" in Armenian

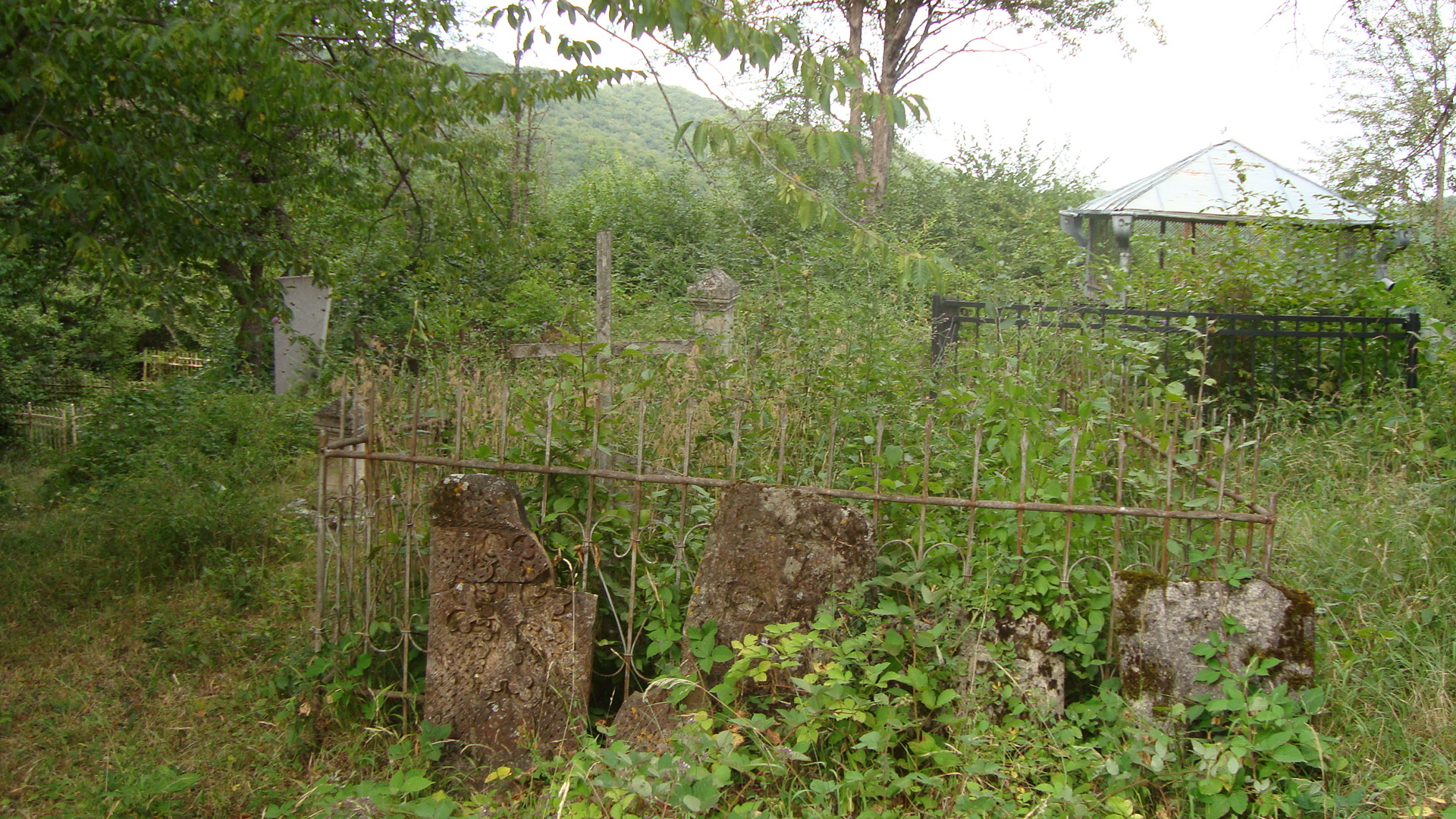
Cemetery

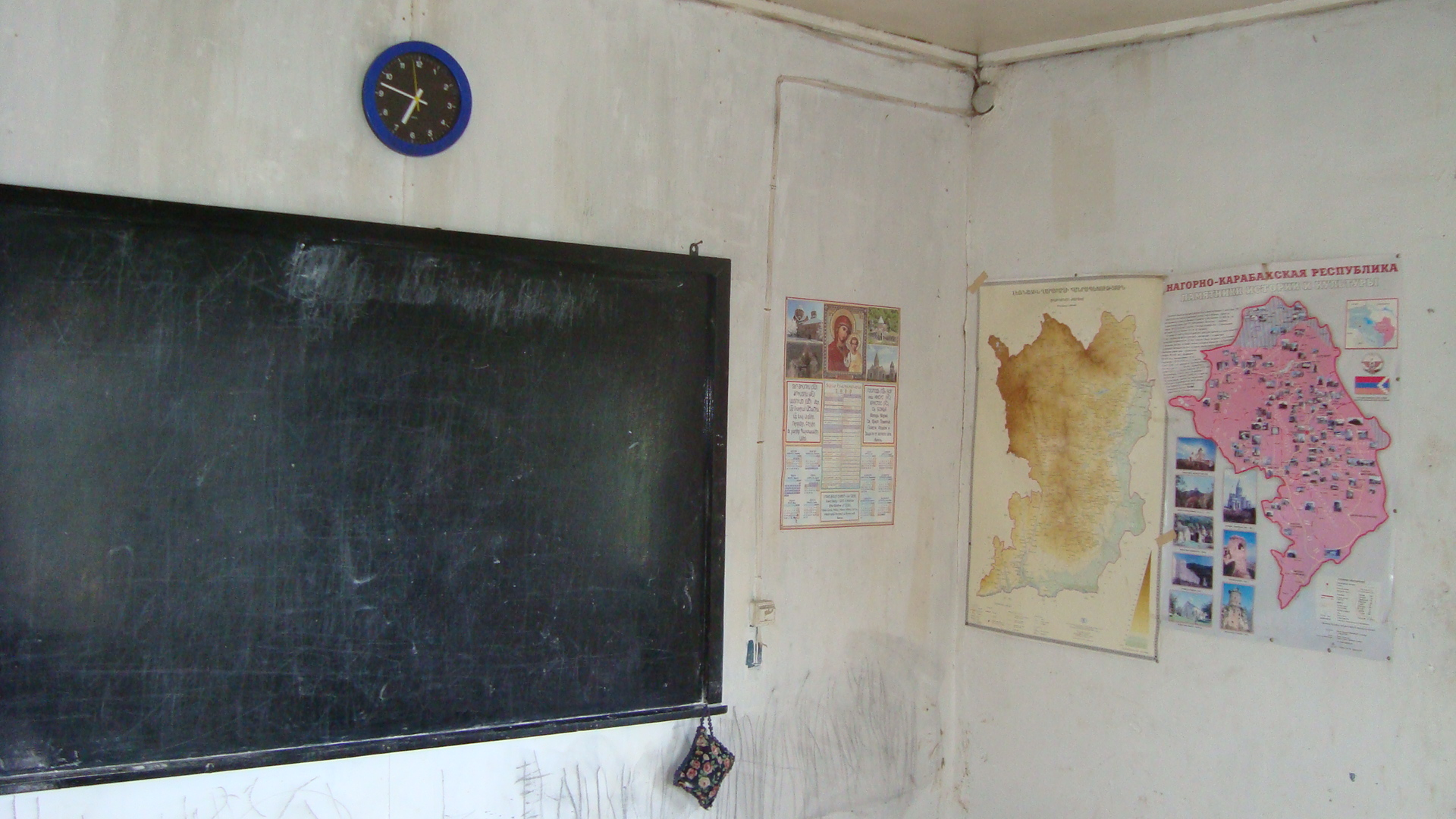
Mehmana school
