= Greeks in Armenia =

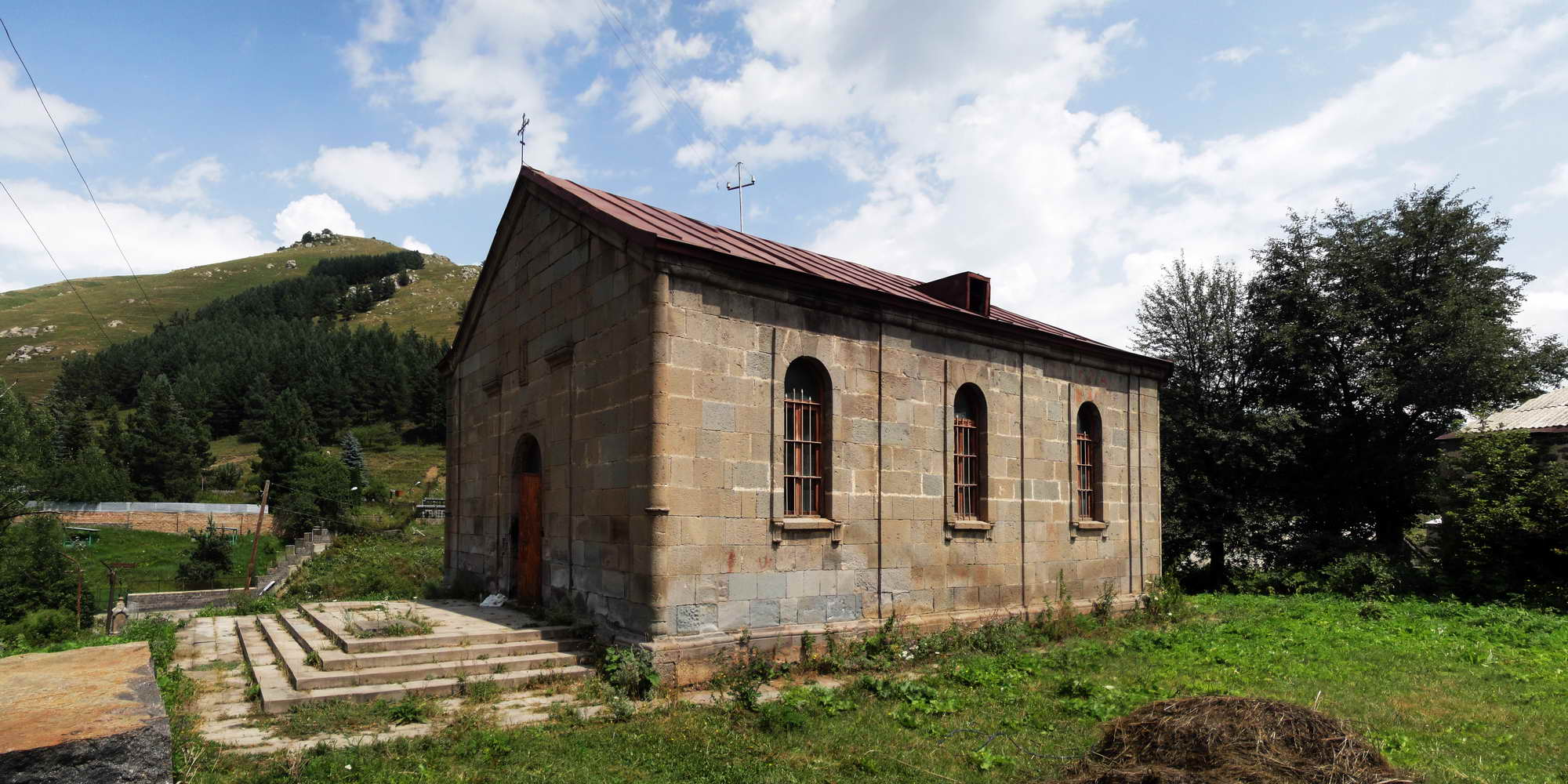
- Greek Church in Hankavan

Total population
- 364 (2022, census)

Regions with significant populations

Languages
- Greek; Armenian; Russian

Religion
- Eastern Orthodox Christianity

Related ethnic groups
- Greek diaspora

The Greeks in Armenia (Armenian: Հույները Հայաստանում, romanized: Huynery Hayastanum; Greek: Έλληνες στην Αρμενία, romanized: Éllines stin Armenía), like the other groups of Caucasus Greeks such as the Greeks in Georgia, are mainly descendants of the Pontic Greeks, who originally lived along the shores of the Black Sea, in the uplands of the Pontic Alps, and other parts of northeastern Anatolia. In their original homelands these Greek communities are called Pontic Greeks and Eastern Anatolia Greeks respectively. Seafaring Ionian Greeks settled around the southern shores of the Black Sea starting around 800 BC, later expanding to coastal regions of modern Romania, Russia, Bulgaria and Ukraine. The Pontic Greeks lived for thousands of years almost isolated from the Greek peninsula, retaining elements of the Ancient Greek language and making Pontic Greek unintelligible to most other modern Hellenic languages. They were joined in the region by later waves of Greeks in the Hellenistic, Roman, and Byzantine period, ranging from traders, scholars, churchmen, mercenaries, or refugees from elsewhere in Anatolia or the southern Balkans.

== Modern ==
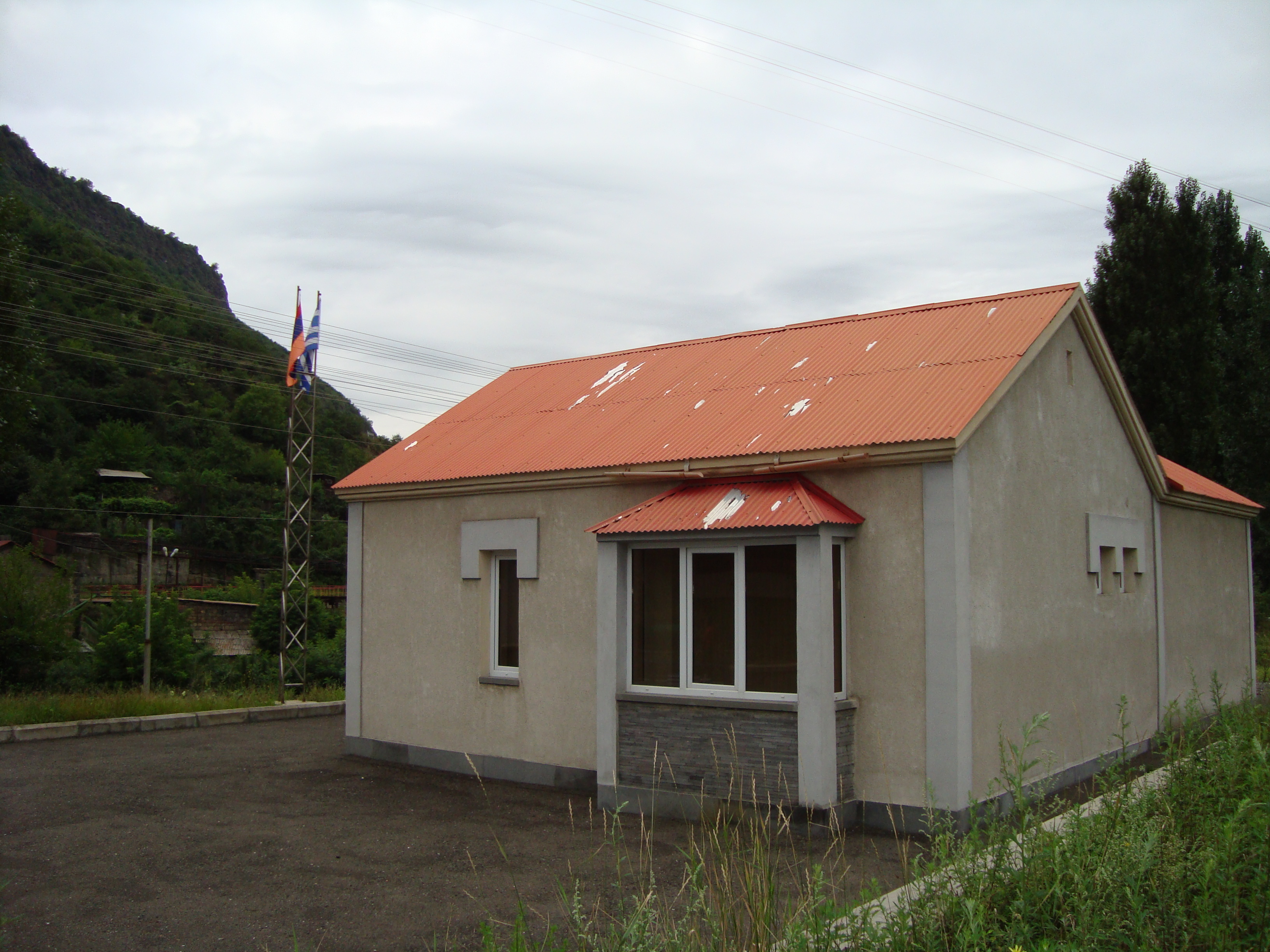
The Greek diaspora centre in Alaverdi

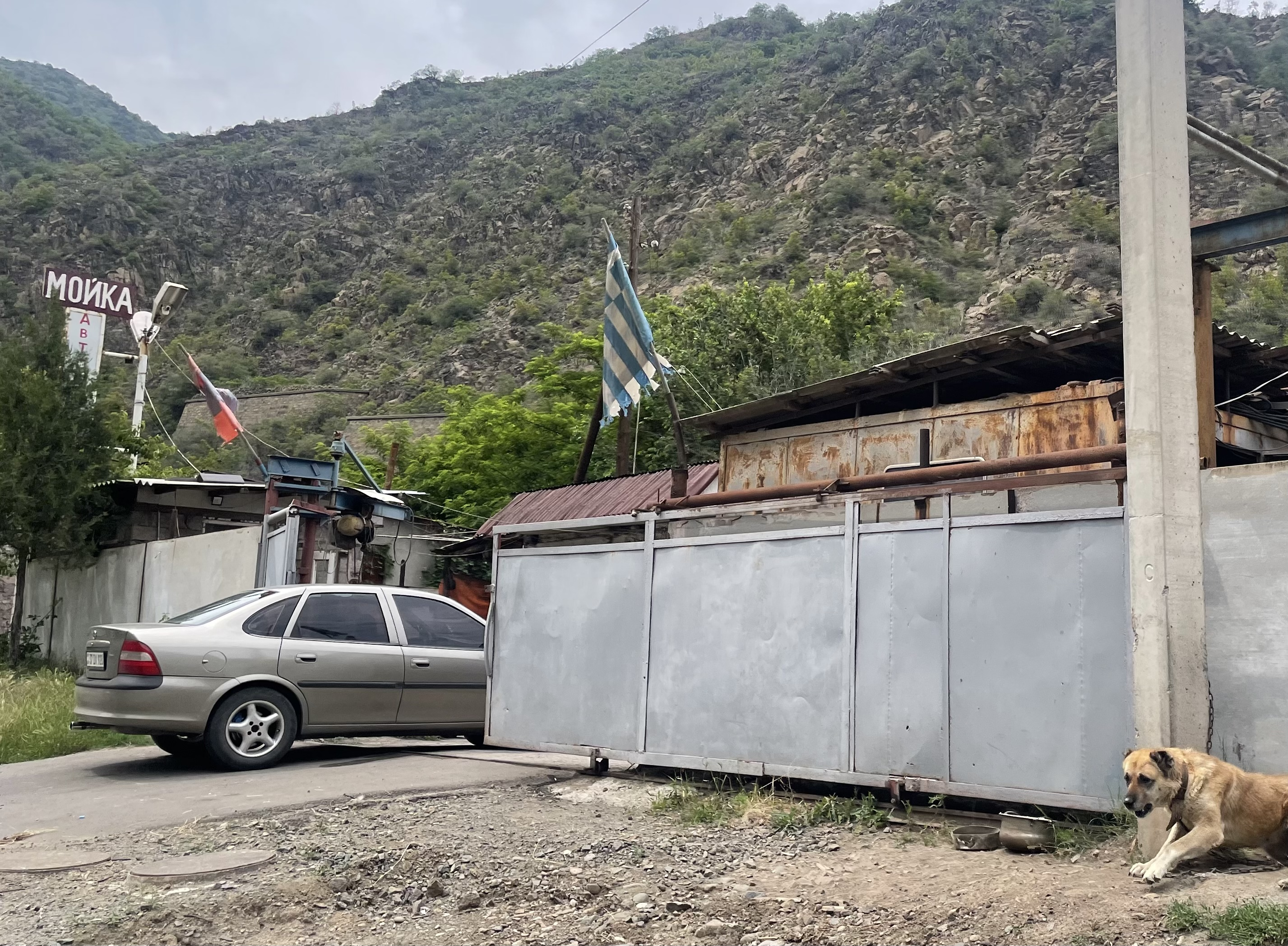
Flag of Greece at a local Greek-owned car service in Lori Province

Several villages with a large proportion of ethnic Greek Armenians are found in areas along Armenia's northern border with Georgia, in the northern part of the Lori marz (province). The largest communities can be found in Alaverdi and Yerevan, followed by Vanadzor, Gyumri, Stepanavan, Hankavan and Noyemberyan. Ethnic Greeks in Armenia numbered around 1,800 to over 4,000. Their numbers have been greatly reduced since the end of the Soviet Union due to emigration for economic reasons to other former Soviet republics and to Greece. Greeks and Armenians also live together in mixed communities north of the Armenian border in Georgia - but there too numbers have been greatly reduced due to emigration. Yaghdan in Lori Province has been described as the last remaining Greek village in Armenia.

Armenia's Greeks, as in the whole of Transcaucasia, speak the Pontic dialect, an extension of the Ionic dialect of the ancient Greek language. A certain layer is occupied by the migrants from Trabzon and Kars region in the 19th – 20th century. (endoethnonym: Romeyus). All Armenia's Greeks are fluent in both Armenian and Russian. The Greek population in Armenia today is about 6,000.

== Demographics ==
Historical population
Year	Pop.	±%
1926	2,980	—
1939	4,181	+40.3%
1959	4,976	+19.0%
1970	5,690	+14.3%
1979	5,653	−0.7%
1989	4,650	−17.7%
2011	900	−80.6%
2022	364	−59.6%

== See also ==
- Armenia–Greece relations
- Armenians in Greece
- Caucasus Greeks
- Greeks in Georgia
- Greeks in Azerbaijan
- Pontic Greeks
