= Urum =

Urum may refer to:

- The ancient Mesopotamian city of Urum,
- Urum people, several groups of Turkic-speaking Greeks in the Crimea and Georgia
  - Urum language
- Urum al-Jawz, a village in Idlib Governorate in northern Syria
- Urum al-Kubra, a town in Aleppo Governorate in northern Syria
- Urum al-Kubrah Subdistrict
- Urum al-Sughra, a village in Aleppo Governorate in northern Syria
- A Mongolian clotted cream often eaten on bread with sugar
- An Old English pronoun
