= Kitirler, Gerede =

One of the five historic neighbourhoods of Gerede

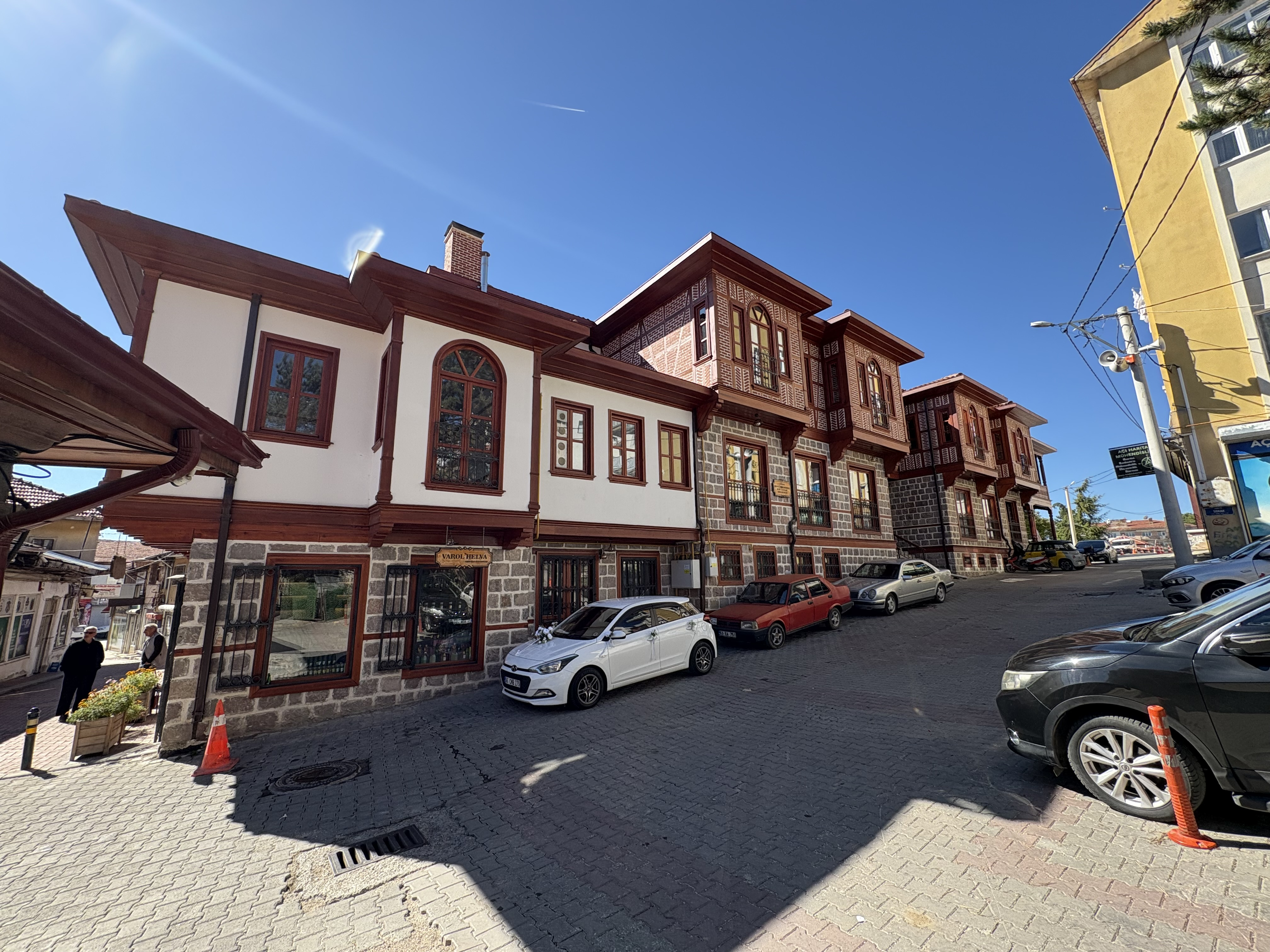
Arasta Bazaar

Kitirler is one of the five historic neighbourhoods of Gerede, the administrative centre of Gerede District in Bolu Province in Turkey. The other historical neighbourhoods are named Orta, Demirciler, Seviller and Kabiller. Its population is 2,603 (2024).

== History ==
Kitirler is one of the neighbourhoods that make up the historical town of Gerede. Gerede is considered to be the continuation of the ancient city of Krateia (Κρατεία), which was a former bishopric centre. According to the 1831 Ottoman census, Kitirler consisted of 70 households. At that time, the Ottoman administration only recorded the male population, and 160 men were registered in the neighbourhood. Accordingly, if the number of women is added to the number of men, it can be concluded that the total population of Kitirler was approximately 320 people. By 1841, the population of Kitirler had not increased; on the contrary, it had decreased by approximately 8 people.

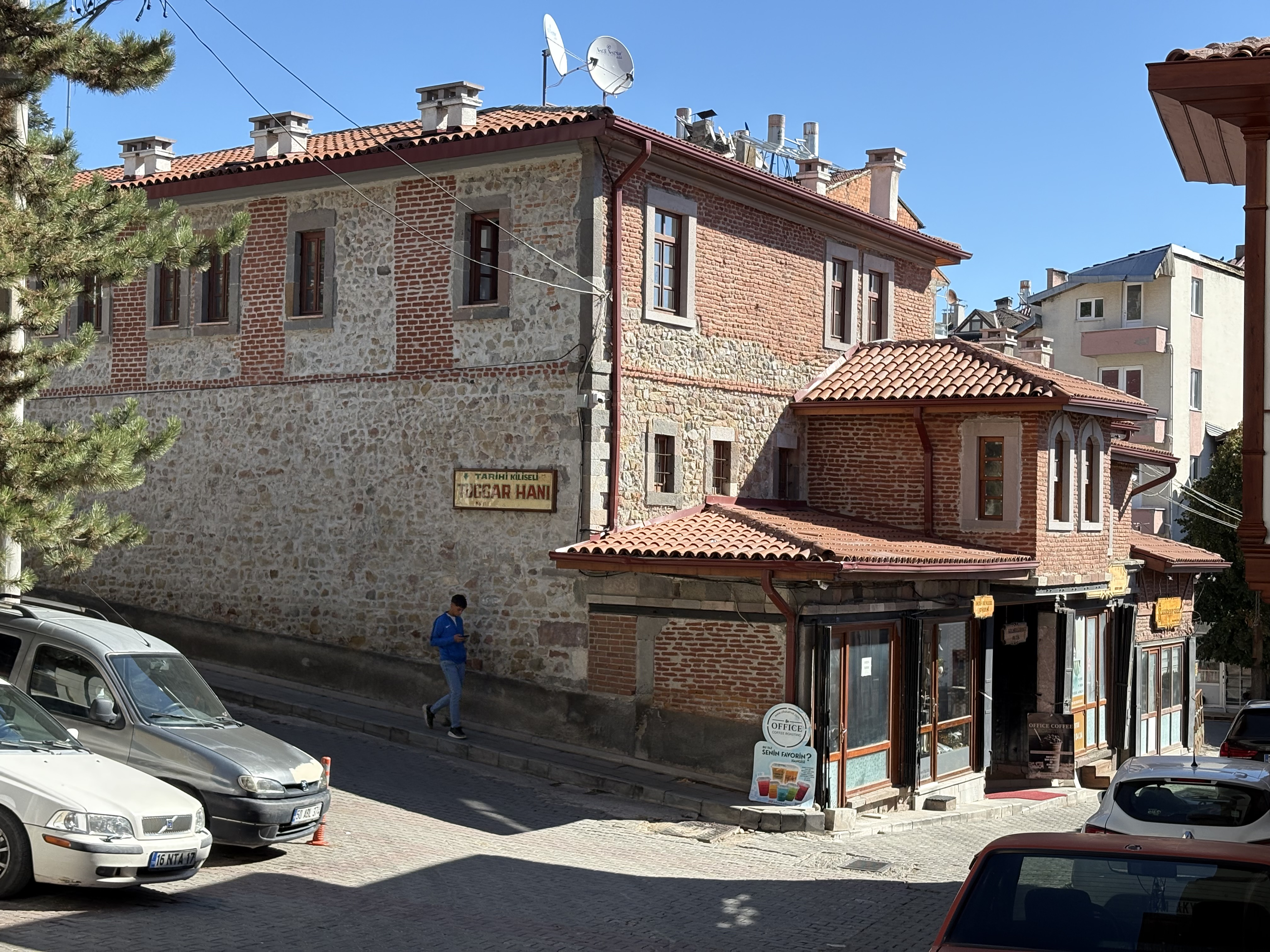
Kiliseli Tüccar Hanı

Today, Kitirler is one of the eight neighbourhoods of the city of Gerede and is located in the centre of the city. The Yukarı Tarihi Hamam ("Upper Historical Bathhouse"), which was restored and reopened in 2024, is located here. The historical structure known as Kiliseli Han or Kiliseli Tüccar Hanı is also within the boundaries of this neighbourhood. It is believed that this structure was a monastery during the Byzantine period. Indeed, traces of this have survived to the present day in the structure, which was used as a han during the Ottoman period and has now been converted into a hotel. On the lintel of the window on one side of the building, the inscription ‘Maşallah 1315’ (1898 AD) is located on the keystone of the central window, while a cross motif is found on the keystone on the right side of the façade. The Historical Arasta Bazaar is also located in the Kitirler. The Clock Tower in Kitirler was built in 1882 by Ahmet Usta. The tower is a wooden square tower and has been repaired from time to time.

== Gallery ==
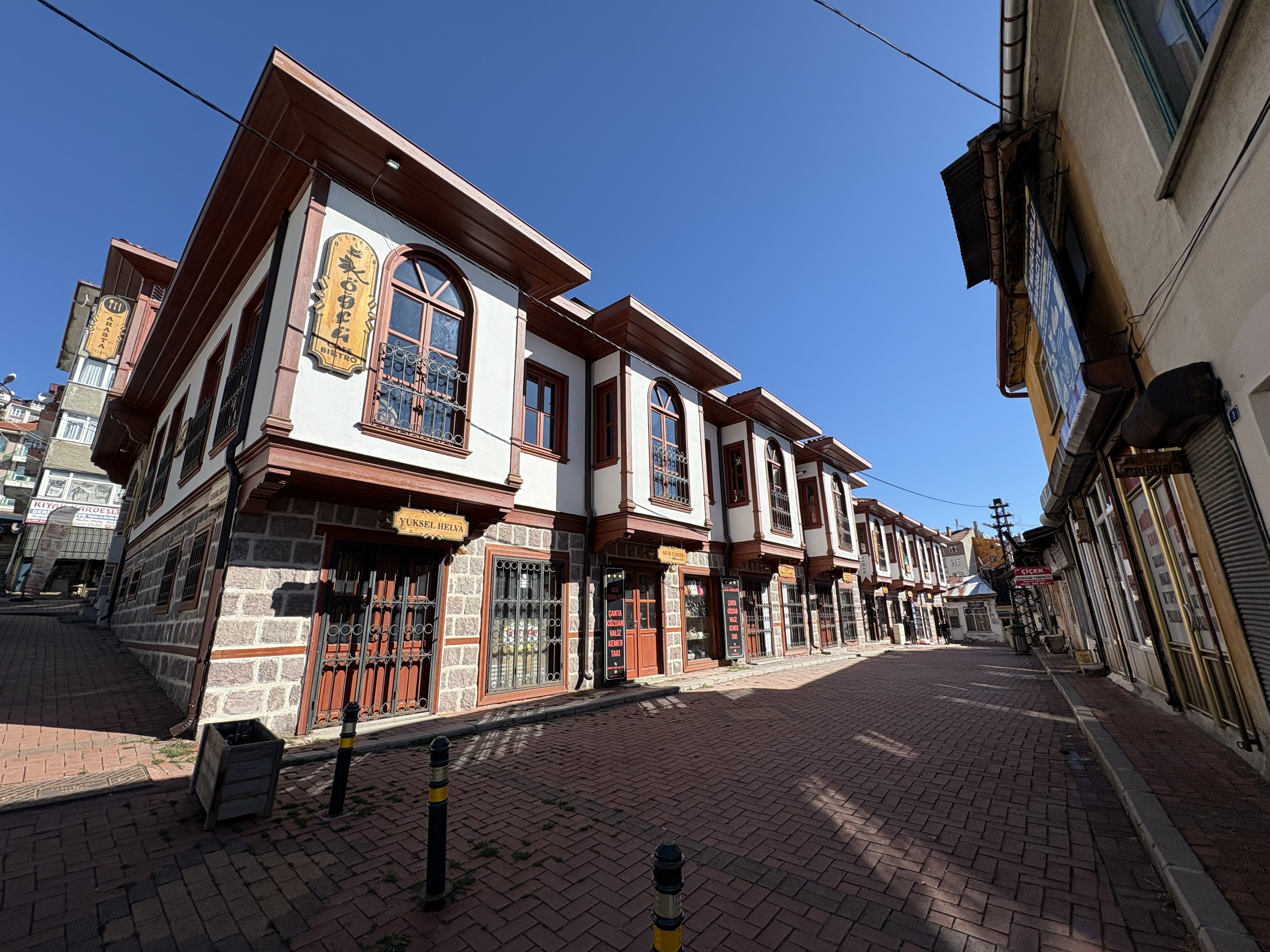
View of Arasta Çarşısı, from the south-west

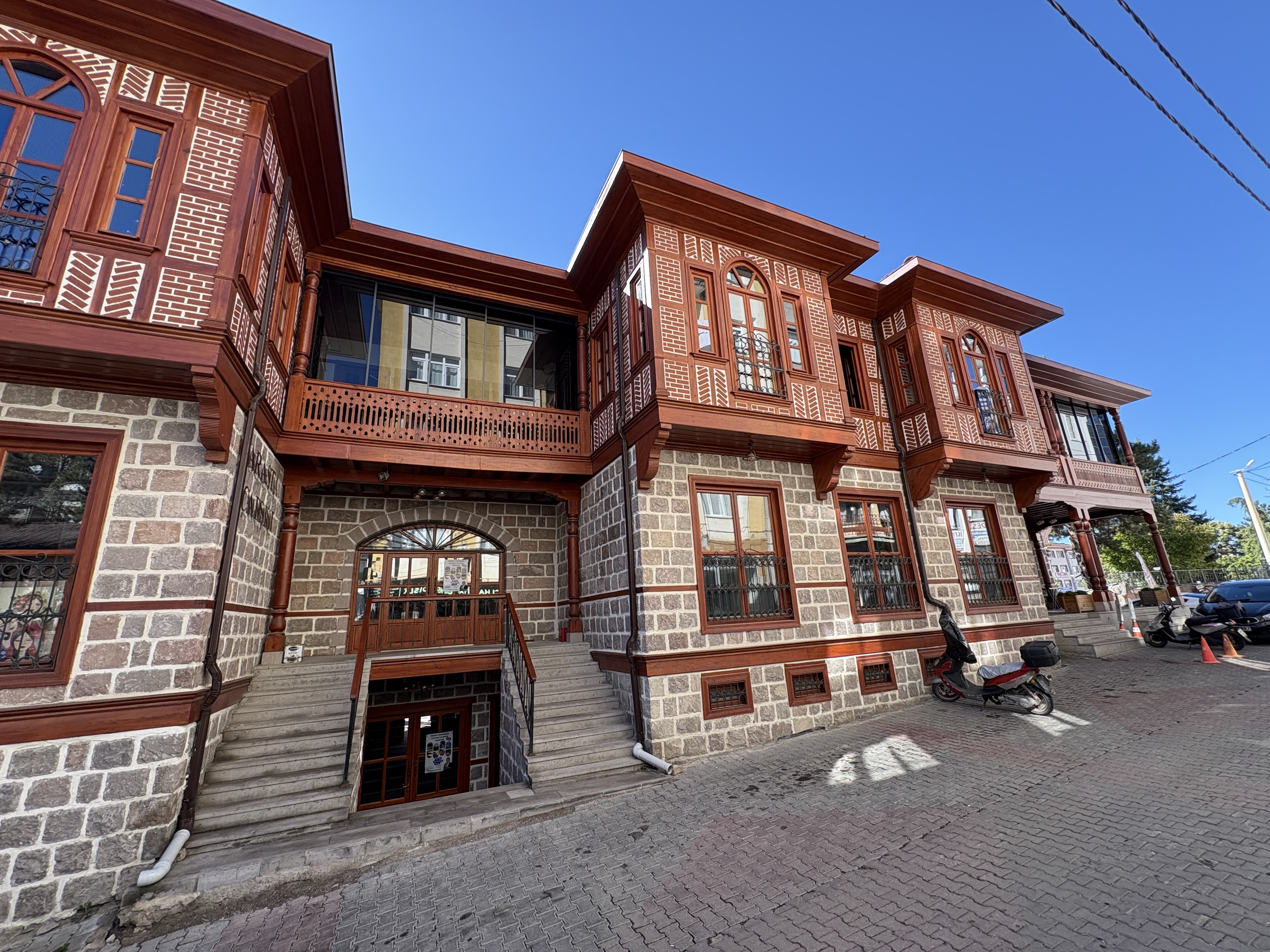
View of Arasta Çarşısı, from the north

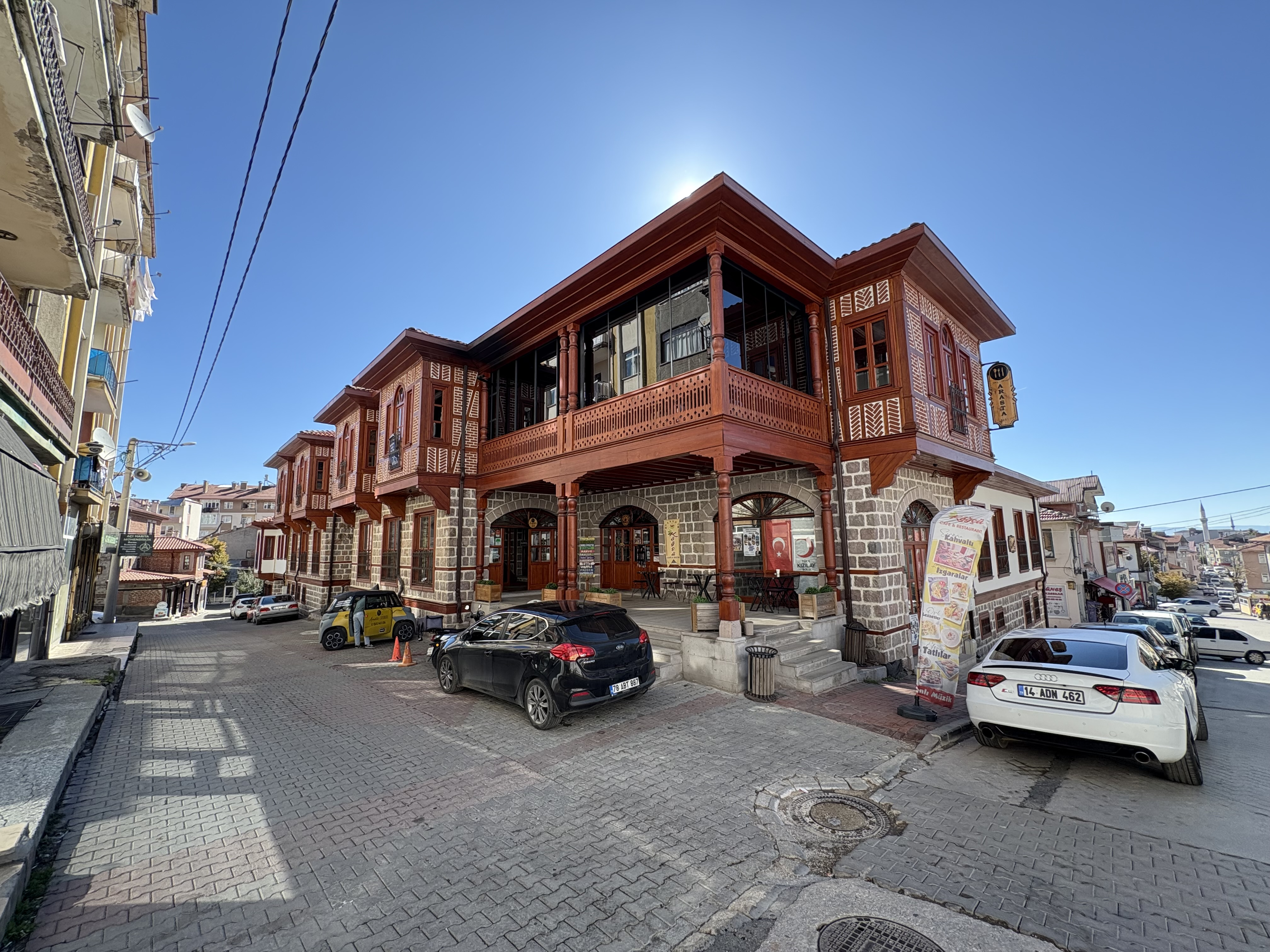
View of Arasta Çarşısı, from the north-west

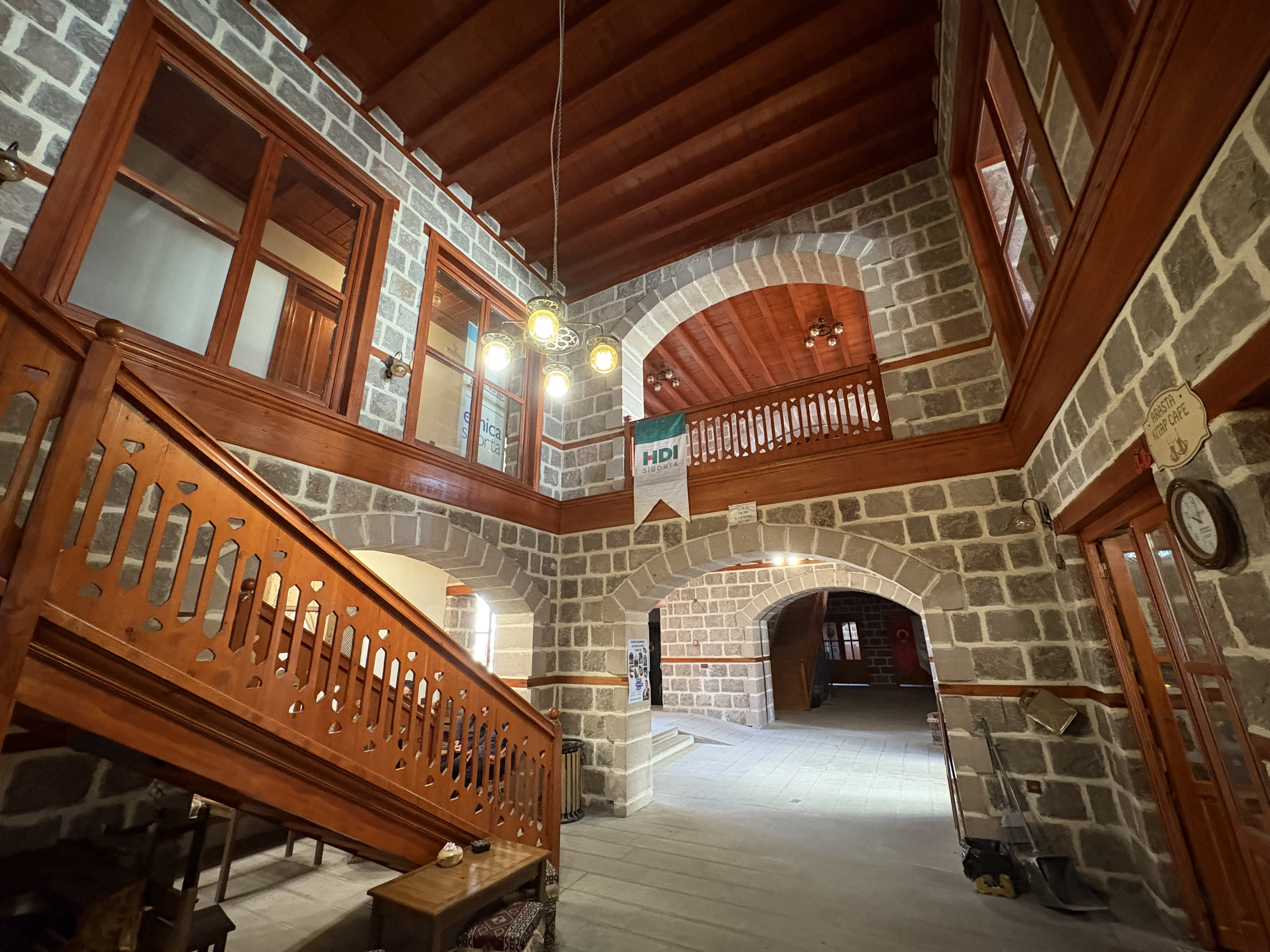
View of Arasta Çarşısı, interior

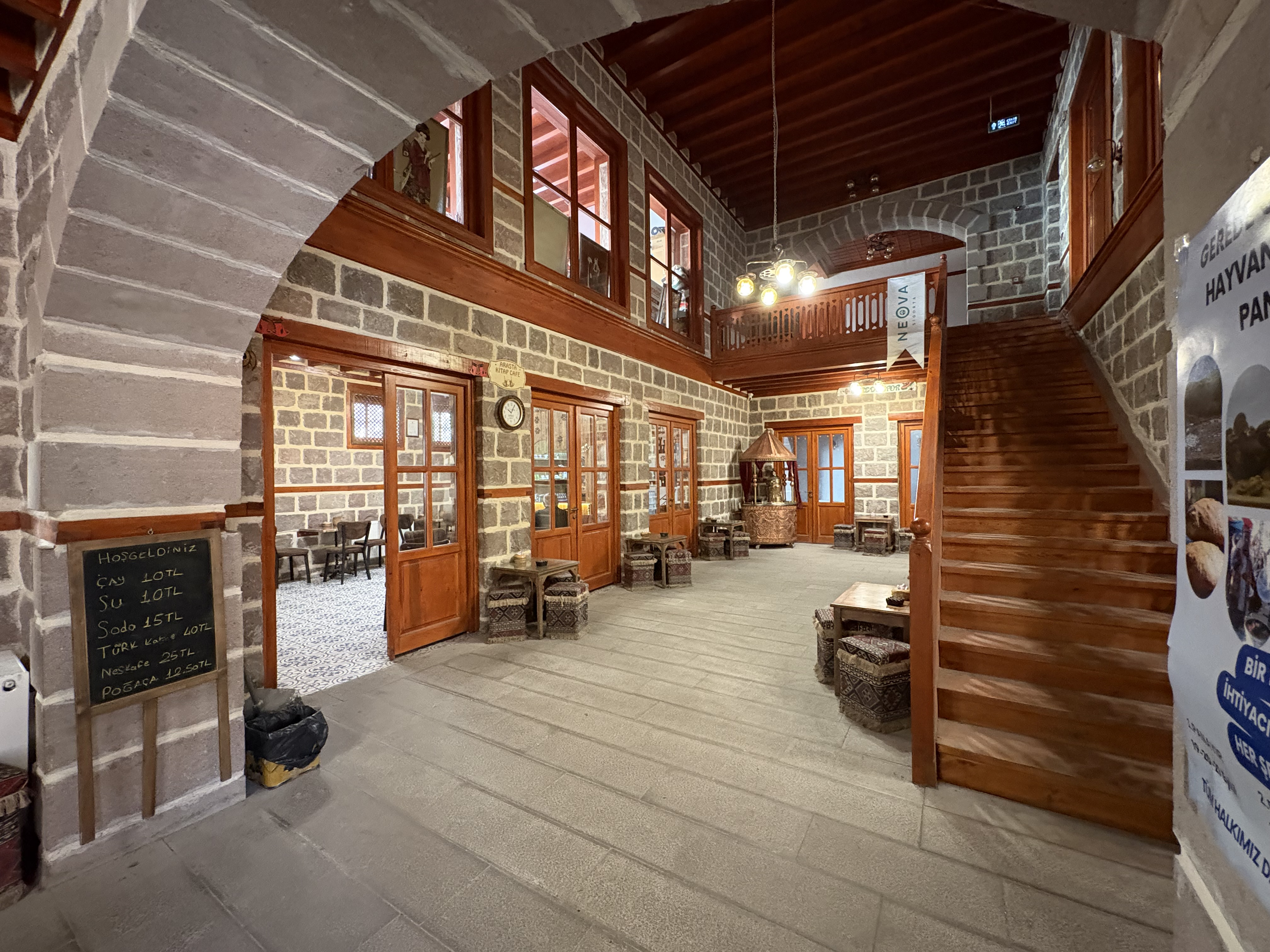
View of Arasta Çarşısı, interior

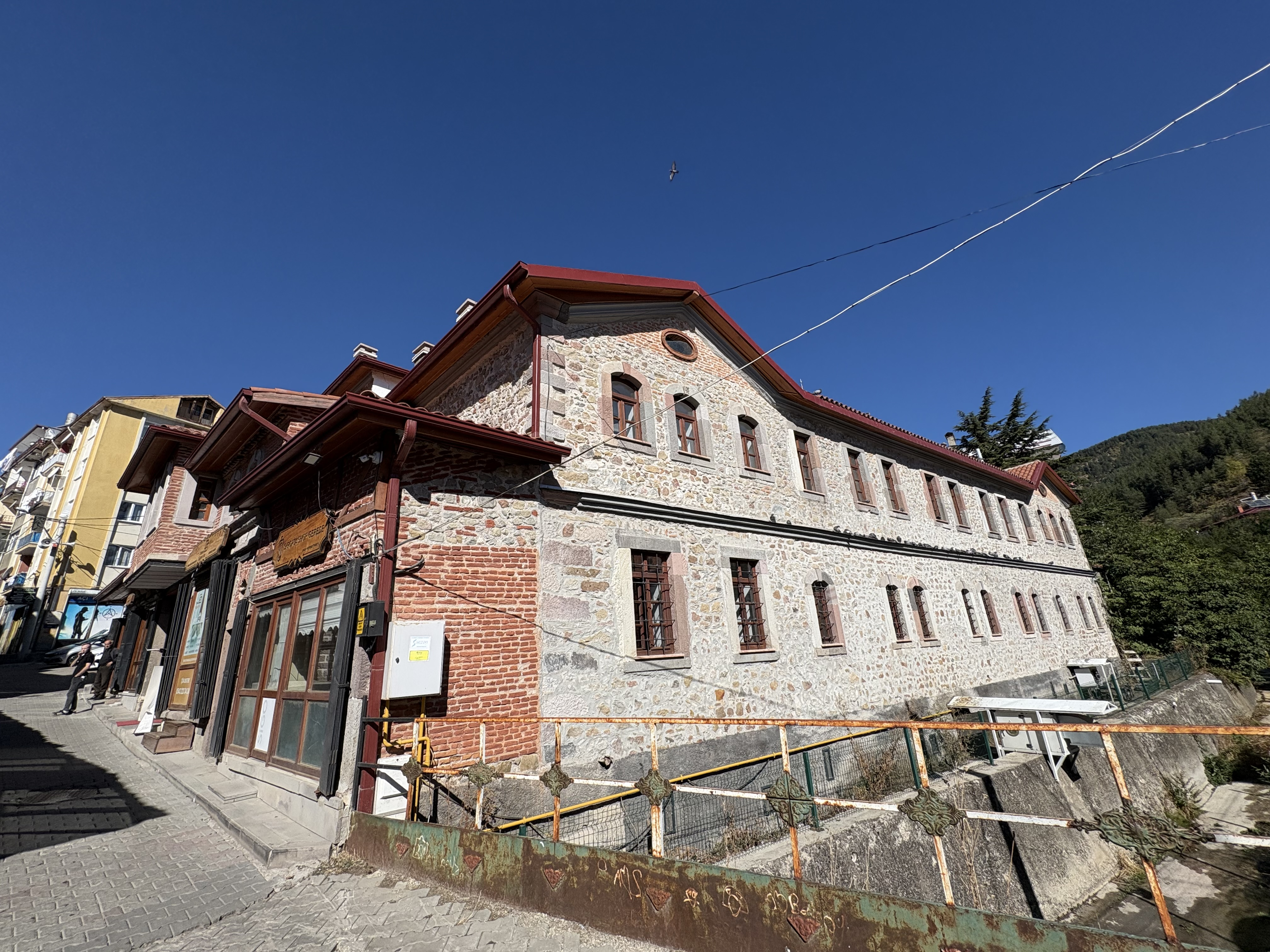
Kiliseli Tüccar Hanı, view from the east

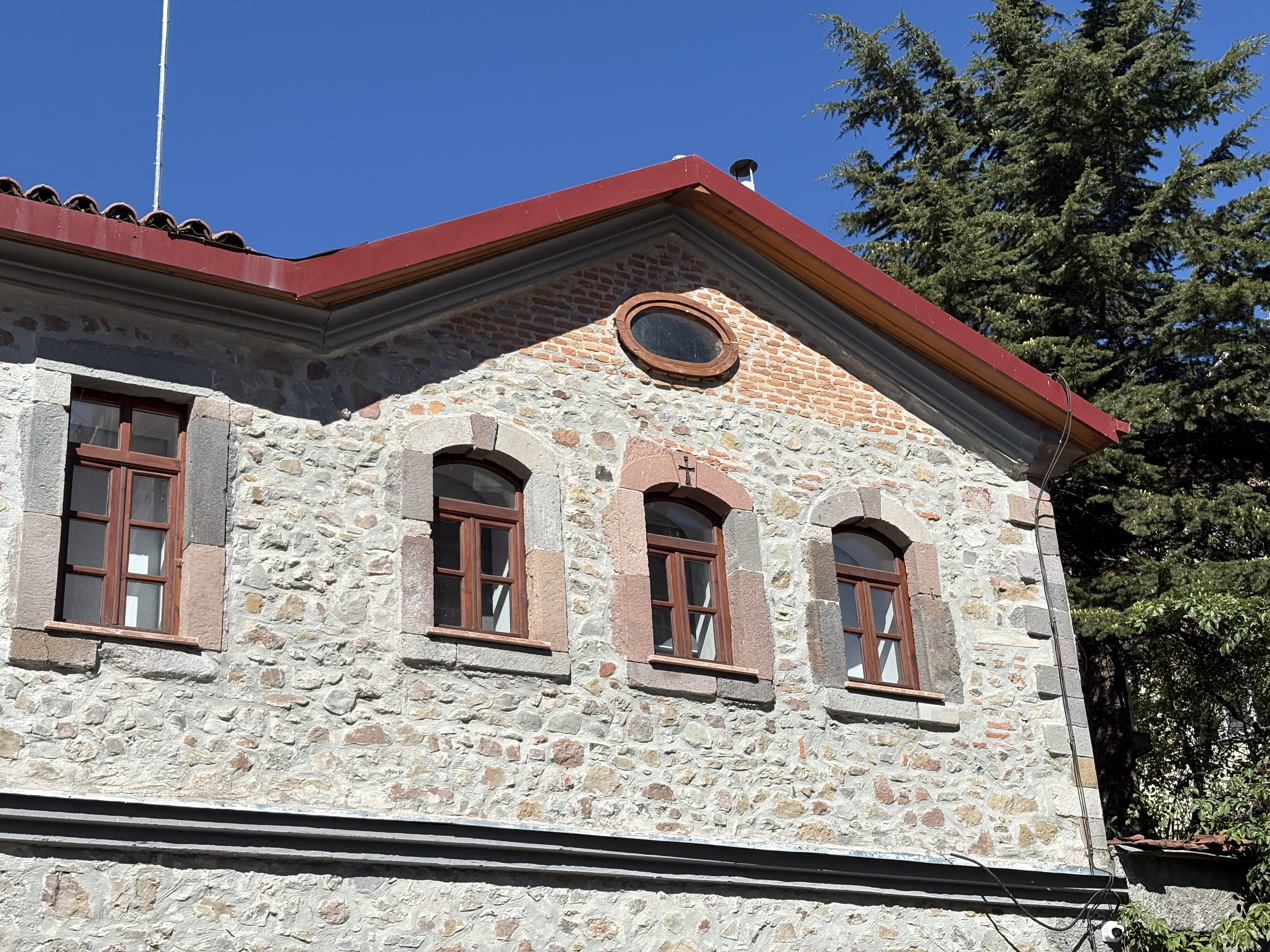
Kiliseli Tüccar Hanı, view of the northern end of the eastern façade with cross

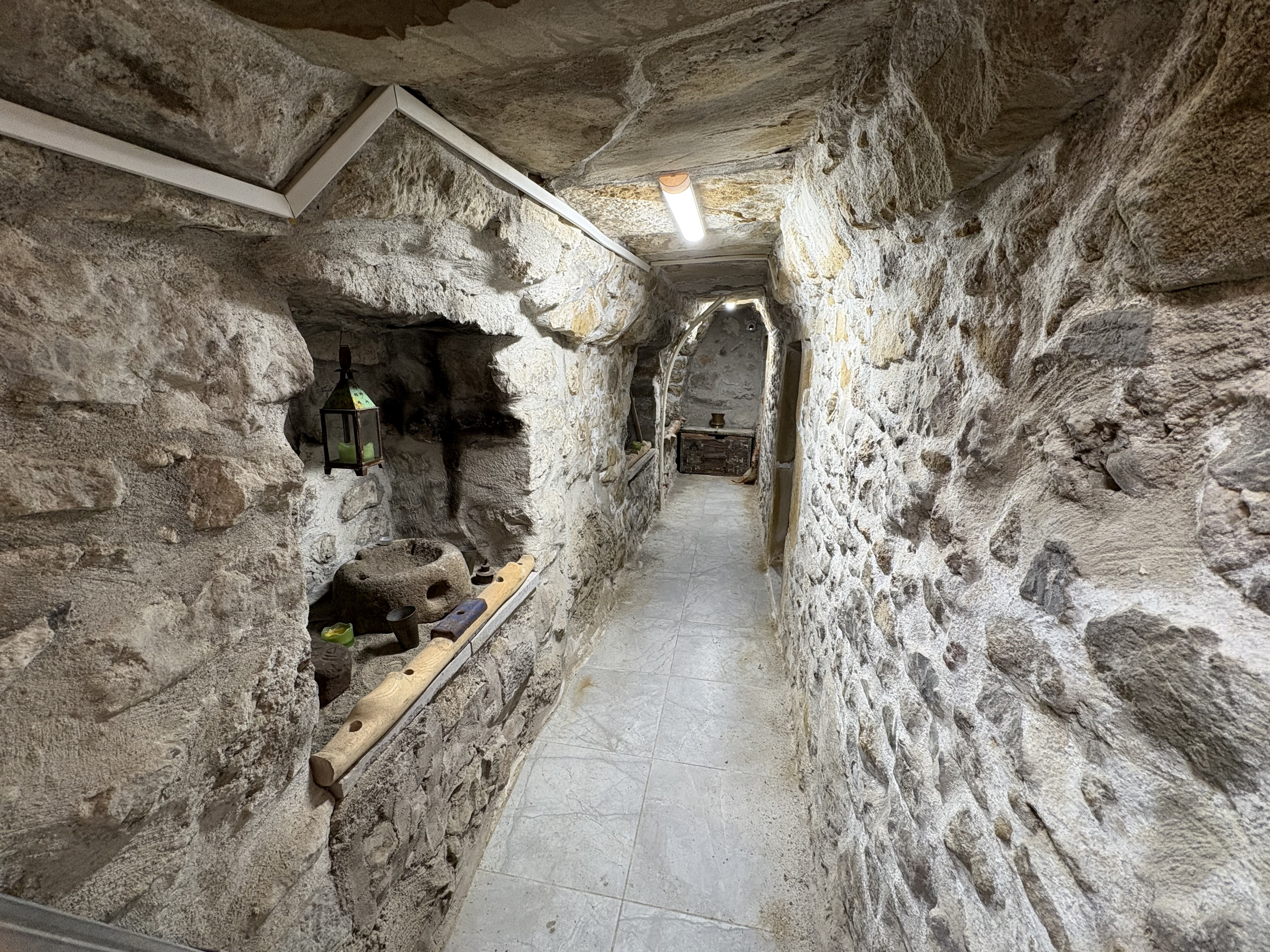
Kiliseli Tüccar Hanı, subterranean chamber with niches

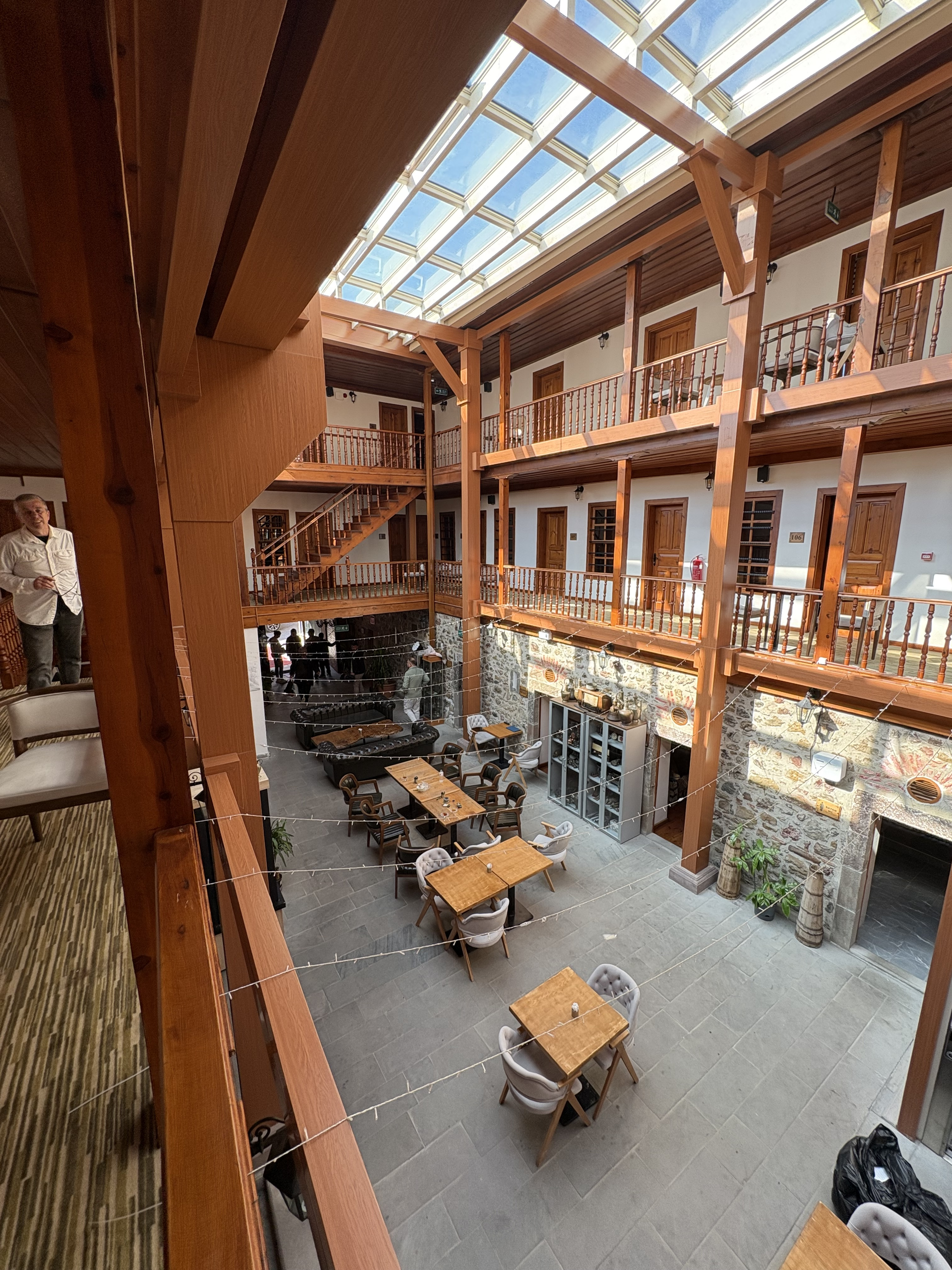
Kiliseli Tüccar Hanı, interior

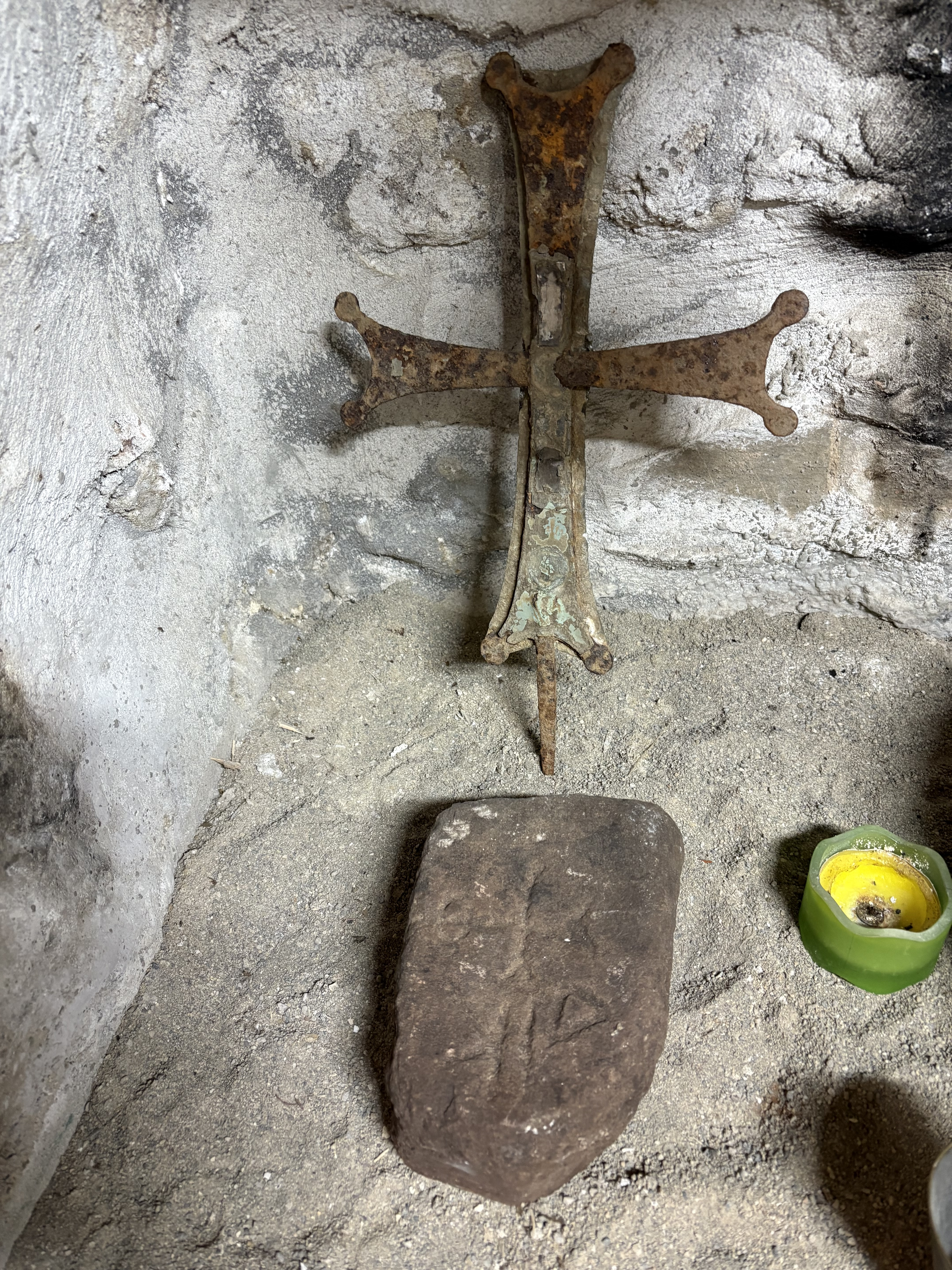
Kiliseli Tüccar Hanı, cross and other liturgical objects in the subterranean chamber

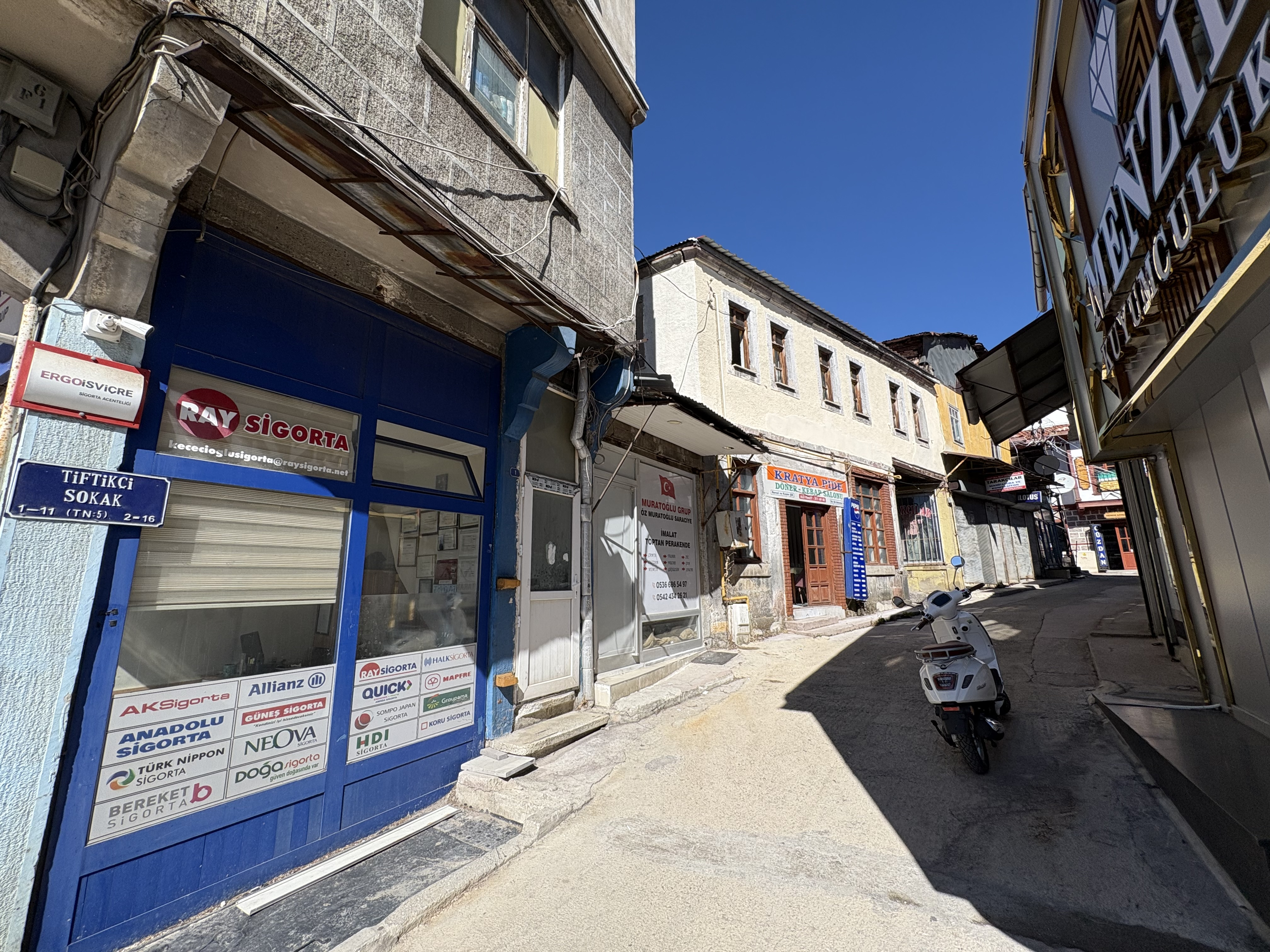
Kitirler neighborhood, Tiftikçi Street

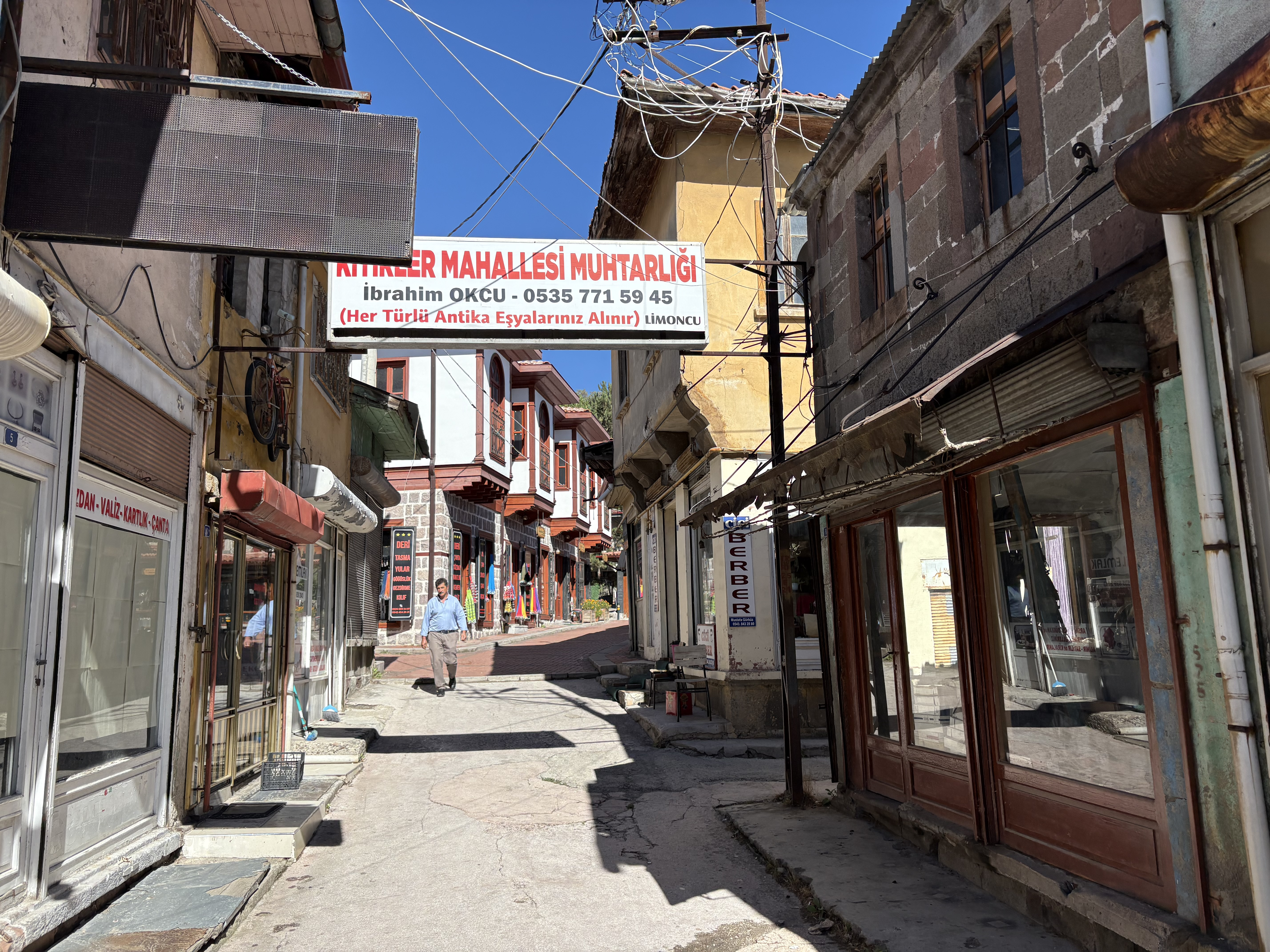
Kitirler neighborhood, Eskiciler Street
