= Kabiller, Gerede =

One of the five historic neighbourhoods of Gerede

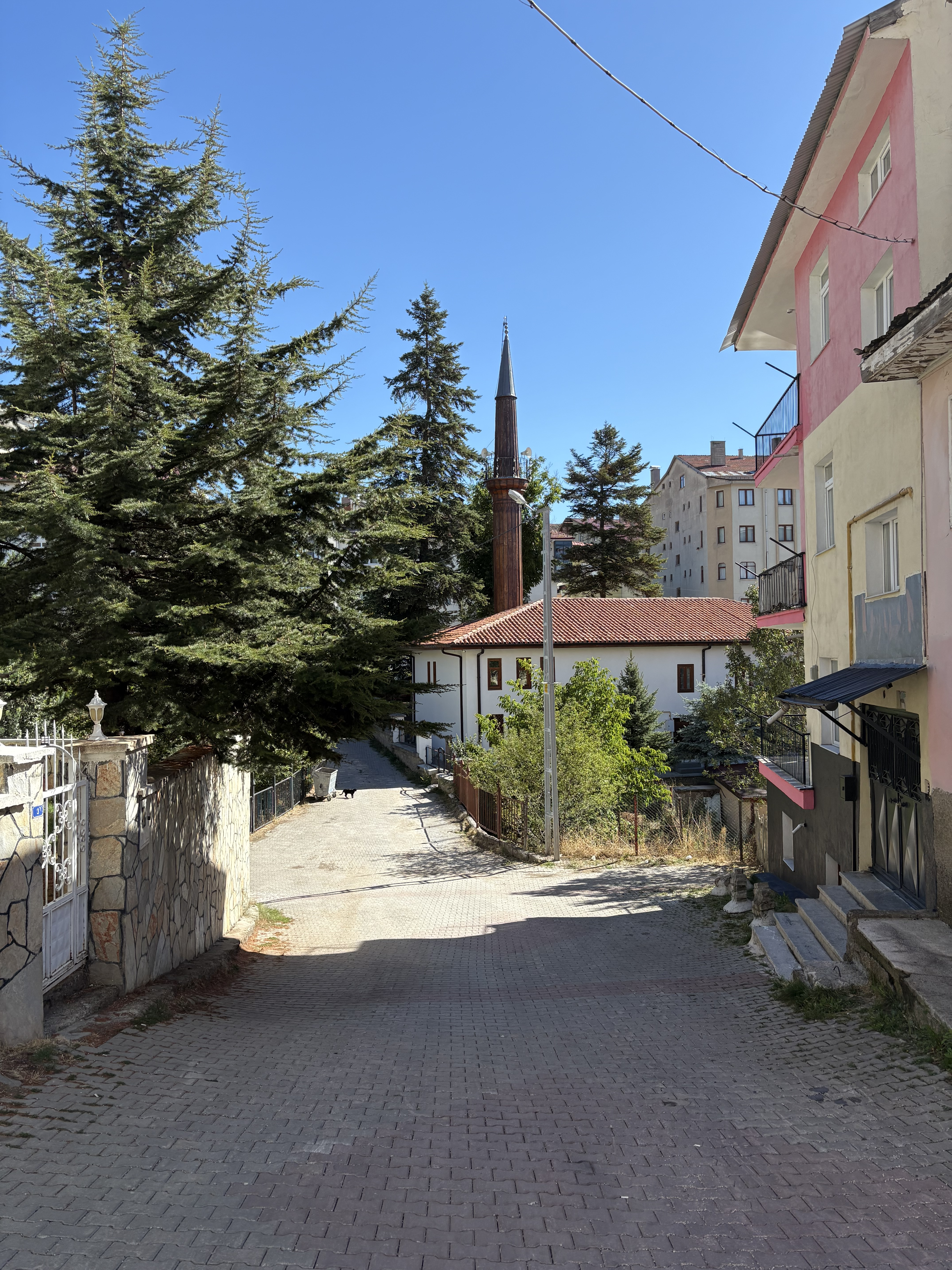
Yukarı Tekke Mosque, view from the south

Kabiller is one of the five historic neighbourhoods of Gerede, the administrative centre of Gerede District in Bolu Province in Turkey. The other historical neighbourhoods are named Kitirler, Orta, Demirciler and Seviller. Its population is 1,400 (2024).

== History ==
Kabiller is one of the neighbourhoods that make up the historical town of Gerede. Gerede is considered to be the continuation of the ancient city of Krateia (Κρατεία), which was a former bishopric centre. According to the 1831 Ottoman census, Kabiller consisted of 42 households. At that time, the Ottoman administration only recorded the male population, and 99 men were registered in the neighbourhood. Accordingly, if the number of women is added to the number of men, it can be concluded that the total population of Kabiller was approximately 180 people. By 1841, the population of Kabiller had not increased; on the contrary, it had decreased by approximately 16 people.

The most important historical structure in the Kabiller neighbourhood is the Yukarı Tekke Mosque. The mosque, which has a rectangular plan, is a mud-brick structure. The tomb (türbe) adjacent to the mosque, however, is built of cut stone. The date of the mosque's construction is unknown. An inscription above the tomb's door states that Abdullah Efendi passed away in the 1267 AH (1850/1851). There is also an old cemetery in the courtyard of the mosque.

== Gallery ==
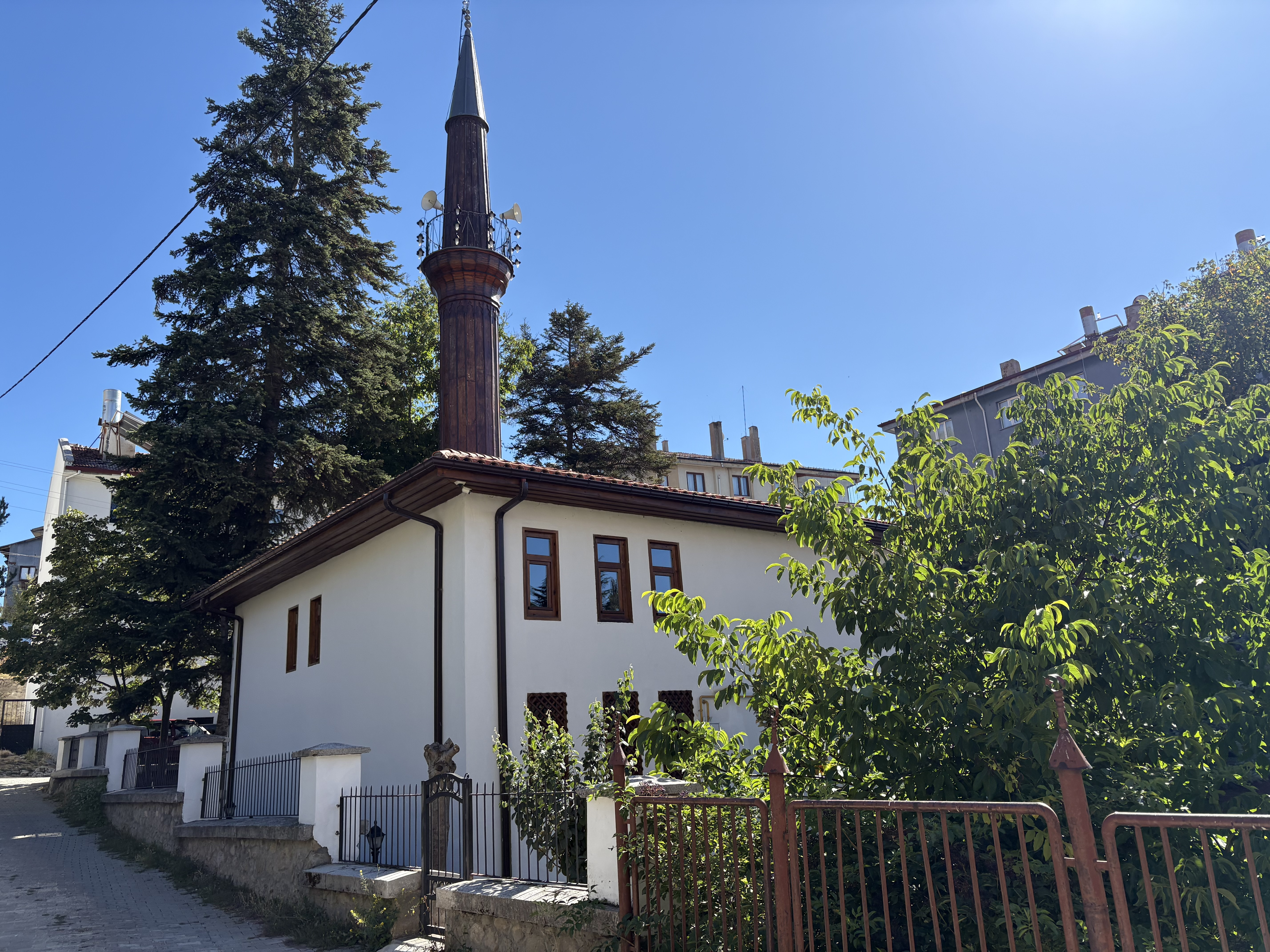
Yukarı Tekke Mosque, view from the south-west

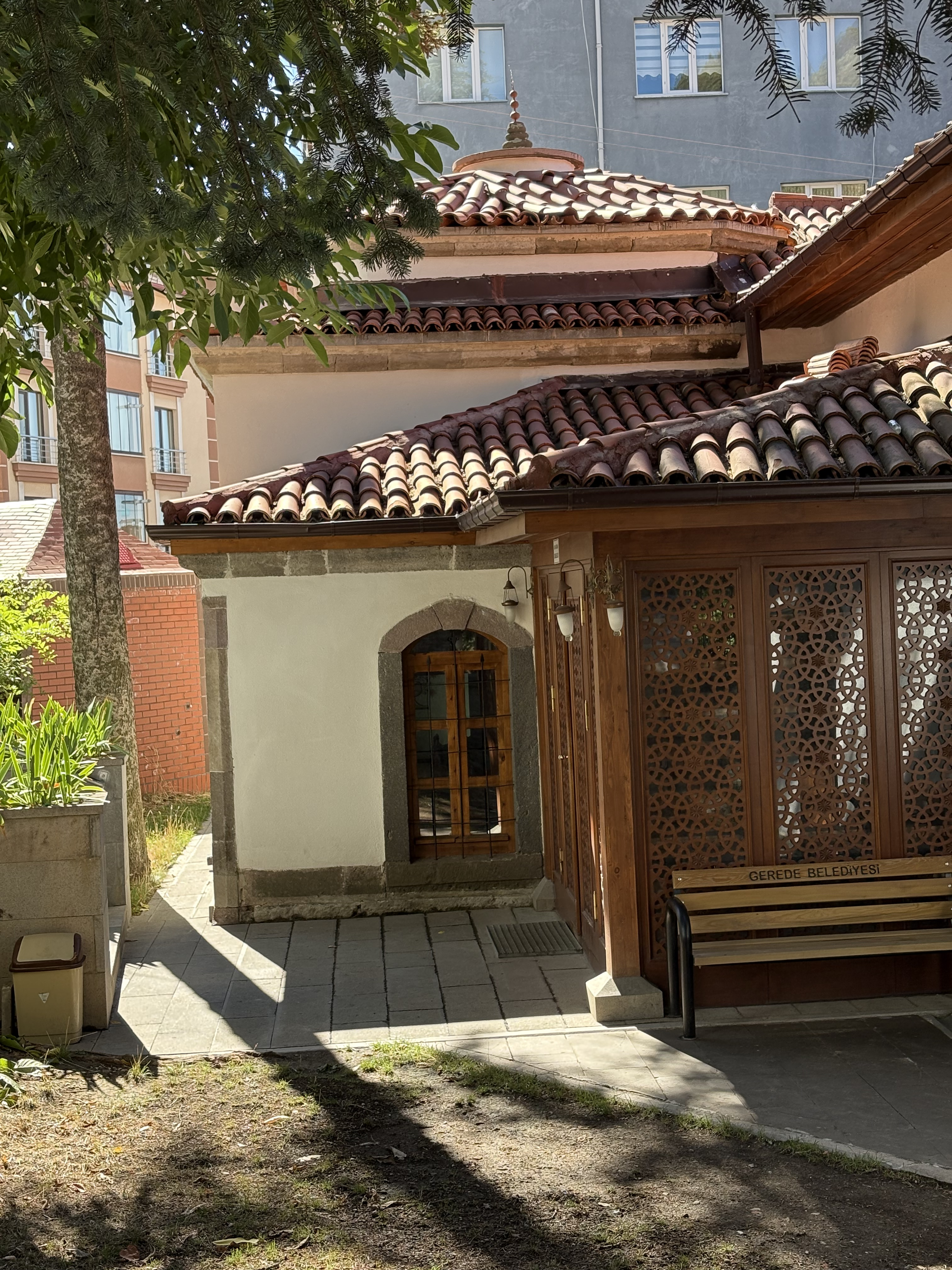
Yukarı Tekke Mosque, view of the tomb

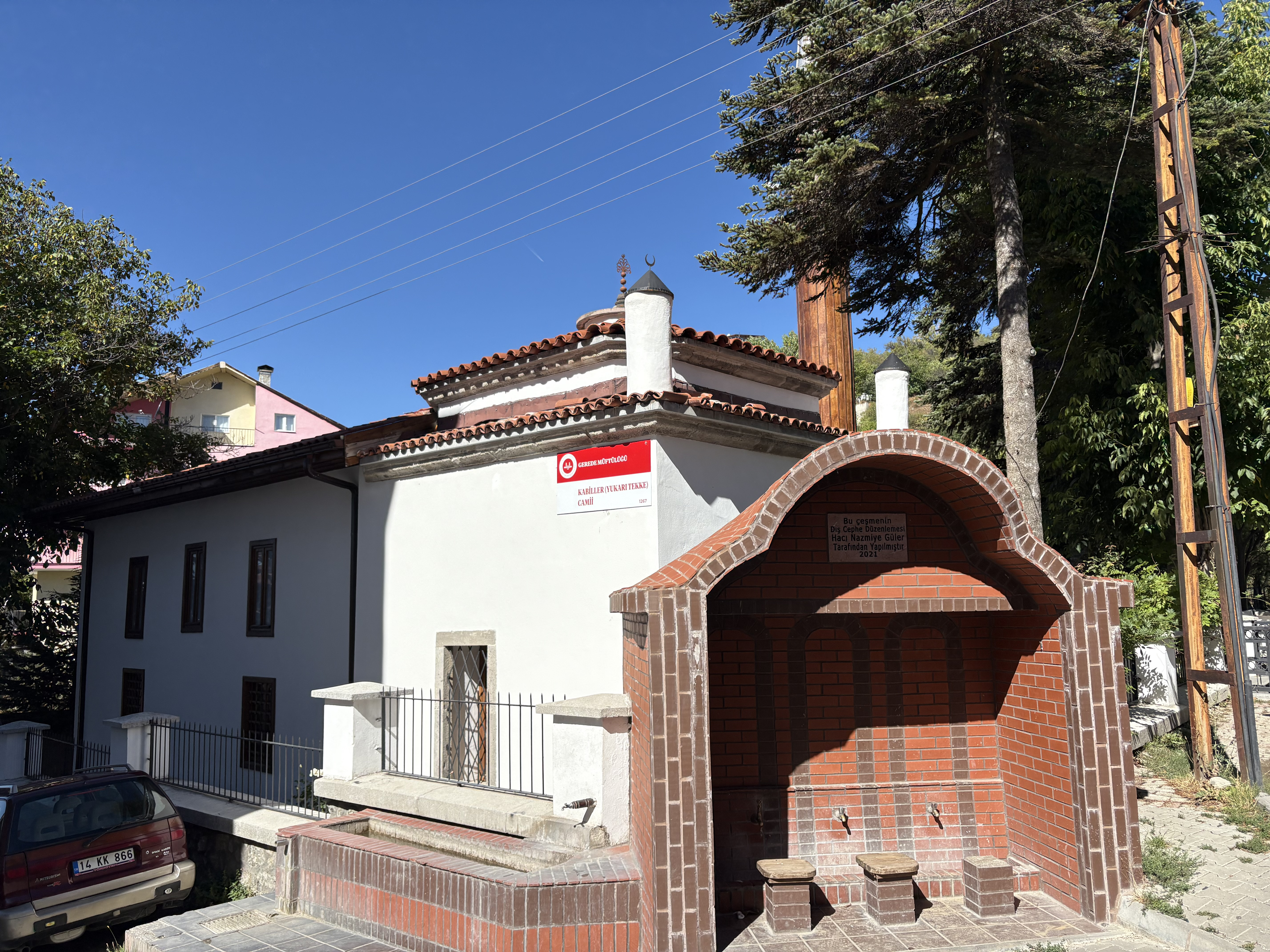
Yukarı Tekke Mosque, view from the north-east

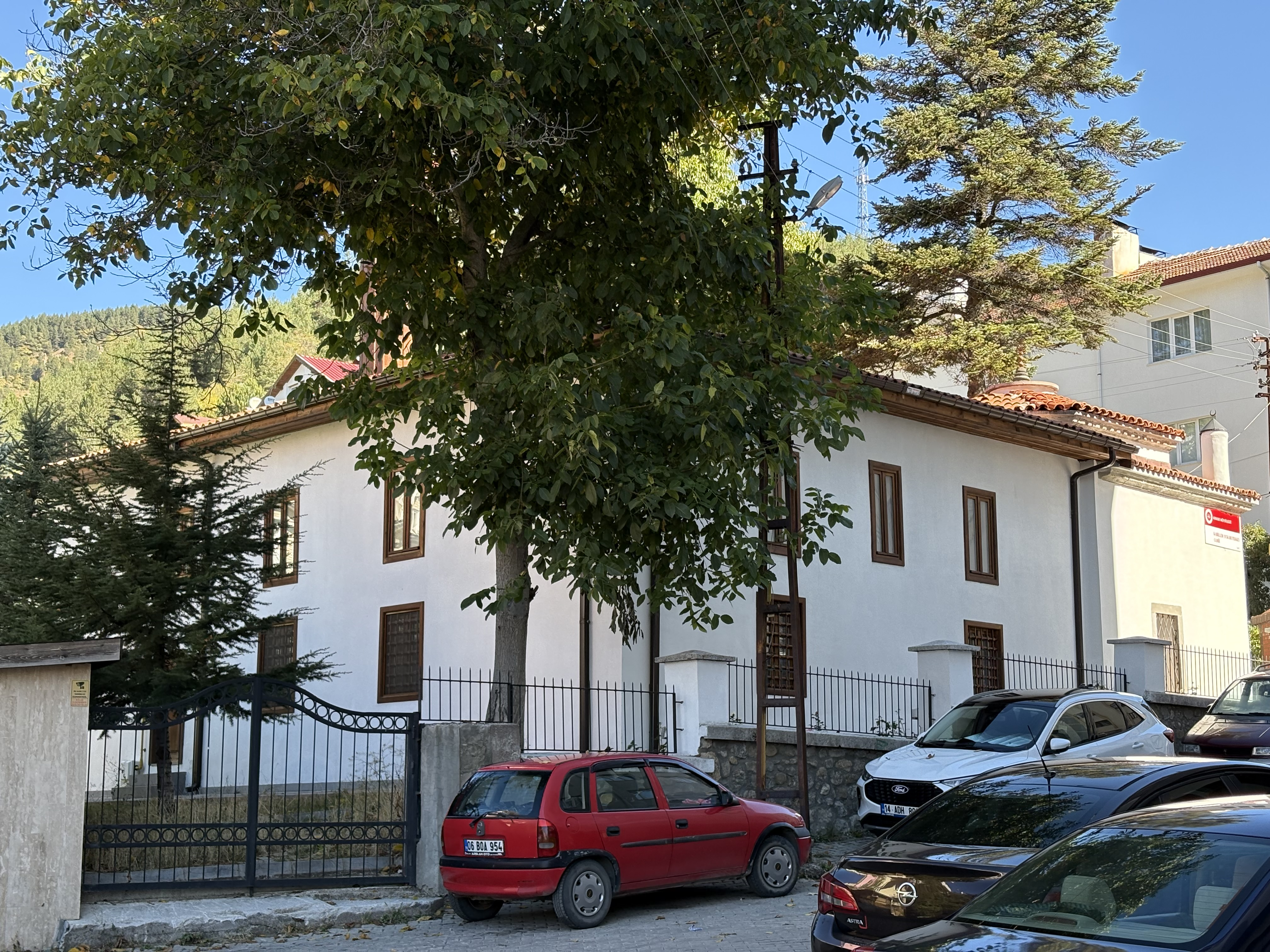
Yukarı Tekke Mosque, view from the south-east

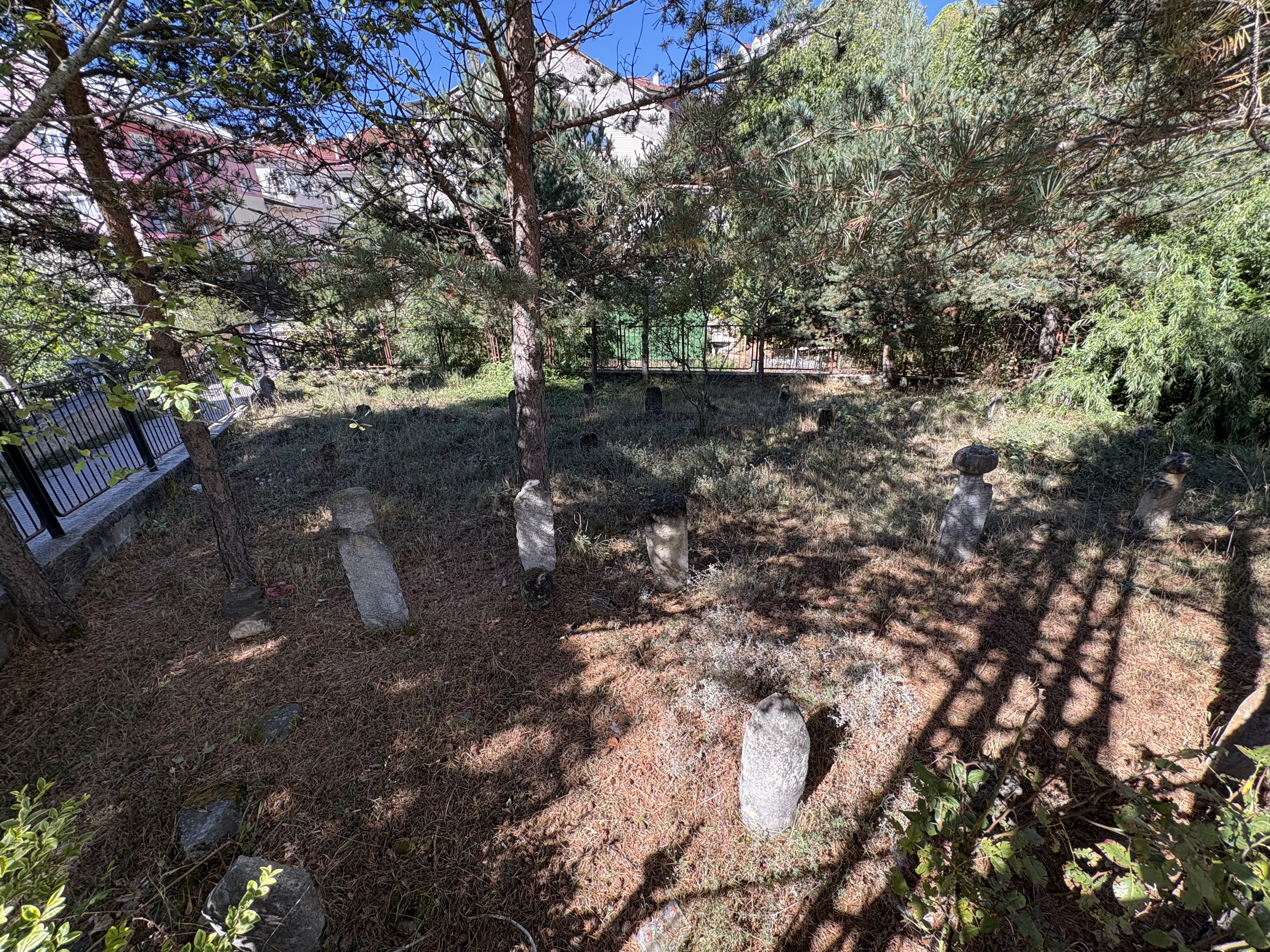
Cemetery next to Yukarı Tekke Camii
