= Seviller, Gerede =

Seviller is one of the five historic neighbourhoods of Gerede, the administrative centre of Gerede District in Bolu Province in Turkey. The other historical neighbourhoods are named Kitirler, Orta, Demirciler and Kabiller. Its population is 4,555 (2024).

== History ==
Seviller is one of the neighbourhoods that make up the historical town of Gerede. Gerede is considered to be the continuation of the ancient city of Krateia (Κρατεία), which was a former bishopric centre. According to the 1831 Ottoman census, Seviller consisted of 97 households. At that time, the Ottoman administration only recorded the male population, and 229 men were registered in the neighbourhood. Accordingly, if the number of women is added to the number of men, it can be concluded that the total population of Seviller was approximately 458 people. By 1841, the population of Seviller had not increased; on the contrary, it had decreased by approximately 22 people.

The most important historical structure in the Seviller neighbourhood is the Aşağı Tekke Mosque. However, this structure was completely destroyed in the 1944 earthquake and was later rebuilt. In the courtyard of the mosque is the tomb of Hacı Halil Efendi, a sheikh of a religious order. The inscription on the tomb bears the date of 1259 AH (1843/1844).
