= Uum =

Uum or UUM may refer to:

- The University of Ulster's Magee College
- Universiti Utara Malaysia, the Northern University of Malaysia in Kedah
- UUM, the U.S. Department of Defense designation for a submarine-launched anti-submarine missile
- Urum (ISO code uum), a Turkic language spoken by ethnic Greeks
