= Fedir Khrystenko =

Ukrainian politician

- Федір Христенко
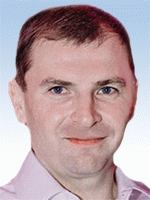
- Official portrait, 2019

People's Deputy of Ukraine
- Incumbent
- Assumed office 29 August 2019
- Preceded by: Serhiy Klyuyev
- Constituency: Donetsk Oblast, No. 46

Personal details
- Born: 11 October 1983 (age 42) Starohnativka, Donetsk Oblast, Ukrainian SSR, Soviet Union (now Ukraine)
- Party: Independent (since 2022)
- Other political affiliations: Opposition Platform — For Life (until 2022)
- Education: Donetsk National University

Fedir Volodymyrovych Khrystenko (Ukrainian: Федір Володимирович Христенко; born 11 October 1983) is a Ukrainian politician currently serving as a People's Deputy of Ukraine from Ukraine's 46th electoral district since 29 August 2019. Formerly a member of Opposition Platform — For Life, he is currently an independent since 2022.

== Early life and career ==
Fedir Volodymyrovych Khrystenko was born on 11 October 1983 in the village of Starohnativka, in Ukraine's eastern Donetsk Oblast. He is a graduate of Donetsk National University. He is the founder of Istholdkapital TOK. Before founding Istholdkapital, Khrystenko was involved in the transportation industry.

== Political career ==
In the 2019 Ukrainian parliamentary election, Khrystenko ran for the position of People's Deputy of Ukraine in Ukraine's 46th electoral district. He was the candidate of Opposition Platform — For Life (OPZZh). Khrystenko was successfully elected, defeating Servant of the People candidate Rodion Voshchanov with 38.01% of the vote to Voshchanov's 25.60%. In the Verkhovna Rada (Ukraine's parliament), he is a member of the Verkhovna Rada Committee on Agriculture and Land Policies. He is considered to have been associated with Dmytro Firtash's group within OPZZh.

During 2019, Khrystenko only proposed one bill. The same year, he declared his assets to be ₴114 million in cash.

On 22 February 2022, just prior to the 2022 Russian invasion of Ukraine, Khrystenko did not vote for a bill in the Verkhovna Rada to condemn the recognition of the Donetsk People's Republic and the Luhansk People's Republic by Russia. It was reported by the anti-corruption non-governmental organisation Chesno that Khrystenko and his wife had fled Ukraine following the beginning of the invasion, and that Khrystenko had not been present for any meeting of the Verkhovna Rada since the invasion. Khrystenko was subsequently reported to be living in the United Arab Emirates but was eventually arrested in Ukraine in unspecified circumstances on charges of treason. The Security Service of Ukraine had previously accused Khrystenko of working with the Russian Federal Security Service to establish an "influence mechanism" over the leadership of an unspecified law enforcement agency between 2020 and 2021 to enable Russia to obtain sensitive information.

=== Moscow party scandal ===
In 2020, Khrystenko became the centre of a scandal after it was reported by the Anti-Corruption Action Center that Khrystenko's wife had spent US$1 million on a party in Moscow including Russian musical artists Nikolay Baskov, Philipp Kirkorov, Grigory Leps, and Aleksandr Revva. This was in spite of the fact that Khrystenko had not reported any significant change in his assets. Following the Anti-Corruption Action Center reporting the incident to the National Agency for Prevention of Corruption, it was announced that the agency was investigating the incident.
