= Urums =

Turkic-speaking Greek Orthodox group

Total population
- >192,700

Regions with significant populations
- Greece, Russia, Georgia, Ukraine

Languages
- Urum, Tsalka

Religion
- Eastern Orthodoxy

Related ethnic groups
- Other Ukrainian Greeks, Pontics, Caucasian Greeks, Crimean Tatars, Crimean Karaites, Krymchaks, Meskhetian Turks

Urums (/ʊəˈruːm/, /ʊˈruːm/; Greek: Ουρούμ, Urúm; Turkish and Crimean Tatar: Urum, IPA: [uˈɾum]) are several groups of Turkic-speaking Greek Orthodox people native to Crimea, northeastern Turkey and Transcaucasia. The emergence and development of the Urum identity took place from 13th to the 17th centuries. Bringing together the Crimean Greeks along with Greek-speaking Crimean Alans and Crimean Goths, with other indigenous groups that had long inhabited the region, resulting in a gradual transformation of their collective identity.

== History ==
There are different theories postulating how the Urums may have originated. One hypothesis is that Crimean Urums arose as a result of some Crimean Greeks converting to using the Crimean Tatar language. Another theory is that the Urums arose as a result of the adoption of Christianity by a group of Crimean Tatars. Some also speculate that the Urums from Crimea/Ukraine and Georgia have the same origins from Anatolia, with some even going as far to say that the two Urum groups speak the same language; however, the latter is not supported with the available linguistic data.

== Etymology ==
The term Urum is derived from the Arabic word روم (rūm), meaning Roman and subsequently Byzantine and Greek, with a prothetic u in some Turkic languages. In Ottoman Turkish under the Ottoman Empire, Rum denoted Orthodox Christians living in the Empire; in modern Turkish, Rum denotes Greeks living in Turkey and Cyprus. The word "Urum" involves a prothetic u- that generally appears in Turkic language loanwords initially starting with a r-. The common use of the term Urum appears to have led to some confusion, as most Turkish-speaking Greeks were called Urum.

The term is used by the following sub-ethnic groups of Greeks as a way of ethnic self-identification:

- Crimean-Tatar speaking Greeks of North Azov (Ukraine) (Crimean Greeks)
- Turkish speaking Greeks of Tsalka (Georgia) (see Caucasus Greeks)

== North Azovian Urums ==
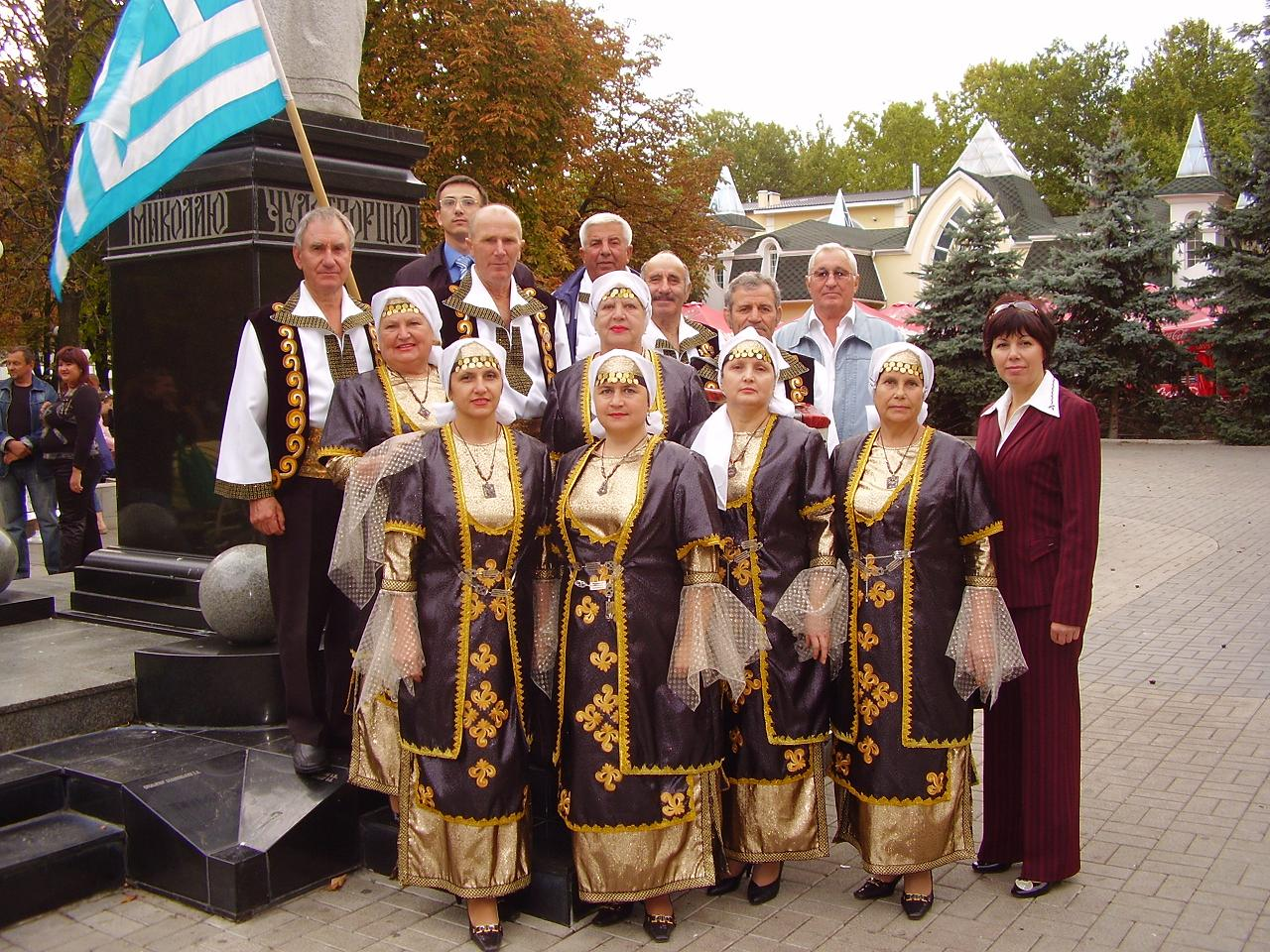
A group of Urums from Donetsk Oblast.

The Greeks of Crimea (and later of the adjacent Azovian region; present-day Donetsk Oblast, Ukraine) were represented by two groups: the Hellenic-speaking Romaioi, whose dialect is known as Rumeíka, a.k.a. Mariupol Greek, and the Turkic-speaking Urums (also called Graeco-Tatars). Both groups populated the region over the course of many centuries, and consist of both the descendants of the ancient (4th century BC – 4th century AD) Greek and Byzantine Christian Greek colonizers of the northern shores of the Black Sea and interior of southern Russia and Ukraine, and also of Pontic Greeks who fled as refugees or economic migrants from northeastern Anatolia between the fall of the Empire of Trebizond to the Ottomans in 1461 and the 1828-29 Russo-Turkish War. Some Greek settlers of the Crimea region gradually adopted the Crimean Tatar language as a mother tongue.

In 1777, after the annexation of Crimea by the Russian Empire, Empress Catherine the Great ordered all Greeks from the peninsula to settle in the North Azov region around Mariupol, and they have been known as the North Azovian Greeks (приазовские греки / priazovskie greki) henceforth. Some linguists believe that the dialect spoken by the North Azovian Urums differs from the common Crimean Tatar language on a more than just dialectical level and therefore constitutes a separate language unit within the Kypchak language sub-group (see Urum language).

Urums practice Eastern Orthodox Christianity. Throughout history, they represented an isolated cultural group and rarely settled in towns populated by the Romaioi, despite sharing Greek heritage with them. Unlike Greek, Urum has never been a language of secondary education in Ukraine. Turkologist Nikolai Baskakov estimated that by 1969, 60,000 people spoke Urum as a native language. According to the All-Ukrainian Population Census of 2001, only 112 of the Donetsk Oblast's 77,516 Greeks listed languages other than Greek, Ukrainian and Russian as their mother tongue.

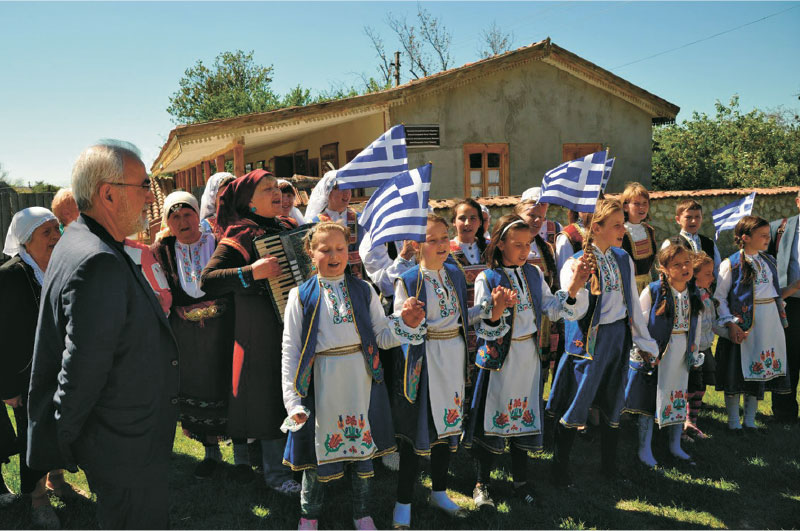
A group of Urums from Crimea waving Greek flags.

== Tsalka Urums ==
Tsalka Urums are sometimes referred to as the Trialeti Greeks or the Transcaucasian Turcophone Greeks, Pontic Greeks and Caucasus Greeks, or Τσαλκαλίδες (Tsalkalides), a name that refers to the Georgian town of Tsalka, where Urums once made up the largest ethnic community.

Between the fall of the Empire of Trebizond to the Ottomans in 1461 and the Russian annexation of Georgia in 1801 there had been several waves of Pontic Greeks who left the eastern Black Sea coastline and the highlands of the Pontic Alps, and then settled as refugees or economic migrants in the South Caucasus, mainly Georgia. The largest and most recent waves came in the late 18th and especially the early 19th century, when the South Caucasus experienced mass migrations of Greeks from the Ottoman Empire, mainly from the region of Pontus, as well as the vilayets of Sivas, Erzurum, and Kars in northeastern Anatolia. This wave of Greek emigrants is particularly associated with the 1828-29 Russo-Turkish War, when many Pontic Greeks collaborated with or welcomed the Russian army that had occupied the region and then, to escape likely Turkish reprisals, followed it with their families when it withdrew back into Russian territory.

Many Pontian Greeks spoke Turkish either as Greek-Turkish bilinguals, or as a mother tongue due to linguistic assimilation processes that isolated groups of the Anatolian Greeks were exposed to.

According to Andrei Popov, throughout the 19th century hundreds of Turkish-speaking Greek Orthodox families from Erzurum, Gümüşhane and Artvin moved to Southern Russia and settled on the Tsalka Plateau, in present-day Georgia. During the Soviet era they populated over 20 villages in Georgia's Tsalka, Dmanisi, Tetritsqaro, Marneuli, and Akhaltsikhe regions. In 1926, there were 24,000 Greeks living in Tiflis and the neighbouring area with 20,000 of them being Turcophone.

Tsalka language, the dialect spoken by the Tsalka Urums, is similar to that of the Meskhetian-Ahiska Turks, an Eastern Anatolian dialect of Turkish, which hails from the regions of Kars, Ardahan, and Artvin. The Turkish Meskhetian-Ahiska dialect has also borrowed from other languages (including Azerbaijani, Georgian, Kazakh, Kyrgyz, Russian, Uzbek) which the Meskhetian-Ahiska Turks have been in contact with during the Russian and Soviet rule. However some linguists, like Nikolai Baskakov, classify it as a separate Oghuz language due to differences in phonetics, vocabulary and grammar. Present-day Tsalka language is also thought by some to be phonetically closer to Azeri than to the literary Turkish, which leads them to believe that it is rather a dialect of Azeri. Late Soviet censuses also showed Azeri as the mother tongue of the Tsalka Urums, however this may have been done simply due to the Soviets' somewhat unfavourable attitude towards Turkish culture. No secondary education in Urum Turkish has been available; its speakers attended schools where subjects were taught in Azeri and later in Russian.

The Tsalka Urums themselves call their language bizim dilja (turk. 'our language') or moussourmanja (turk. 'Muslims' language). Nowadays, the majority speaks Russian. Also starting from the 1960s, there has been a modest cultural revival among the Turcophone Greeks. Historian Airat Aklaev's research showed that 36% of them considered Greek their mother tongue despite not speaking it; 96% expressed a desire to learn Greek.

A documentation project on the language of Caucasus Urum people compiled a basic lexicon, a sample of translations for the study of grammar, and a text collection. The website of the project contains further information about the language and the language community.

After the dissolution of the Soviet Union, serious migration did take place, so Greeks are no longer the largest ethnic group in Tsalka. Between 1989 and 2002, their population declined from 35,000 to 3,000. Many emigrated to Greece, particularly Thessaloniki and other parts of Greek Macedonia in Northern Greece, and also to the relatively near the North Caucasus region of Krasnodar Krai and other parts of Southern Russia (particularly the cities of Krasnodar, Abinsk, Sochi, and Gelendzhik).

== Religion ==
By religion, the majority of Urums are Greek Orthodox Christians. Urums tend to practice their religion in Greek, Georgian or Russian Orthodox churches. Despite there not being any liturgical practices in the Urum language, 60% (18/30 respondents) of native Urum speakers reported that they use Urum in praying. 23% of Urum vocabulary in the field of religion or belief are said to be loanwords - much less than the average across world languages, being estimated to be 43%. According to legend common among the Urums of Georgia, long before they left Turkey, the Orthodox Greeks were forced to make a choice between their language and faith. Being devout Christians, they chose to keep their Orthodox faith and thus relinquished their language. However, most historians consider this to be a myth.

== Language ==
The language of the North Azov Urums is a Turkic language belonging to the West Kipchak branch. It has been written with the Greek alphabet, and between 1927 and 1937 it was written with Yañalif, and it was taught in some schools. After Yañalif's replacement by the Cyrillic script in 1940, the Urum language was to only be written in Cyrillic. Urum is considered by some to be a dialect of Crimean Tatar.

Much of Urum's religious vocabulary is descended from words of Turkic origin, for example, Allah for ‘God’ or cänäm for ‘hell’ (compare Turkish allah, cehennem). However, Russian loanwords are restricted to narrow Christian terms, e.g., gimn meaning ‘hymn’, derived from Russian gimn (Гимн) and episkop meaning ‘bishop’, derived from Russian episkop (Епископ).

The Tsalka Urum language belongs to the Oghuz branch of the Turkic language and displays substantial similarities with the Turkish dialects of Anatolia (e.g. in vocal harmony), but also with Russian (e.g. in the use of subordinate clauses).

== See also ==
- Greeks in Georgia
- Ukrainian Greeks
- Pontic Greeks
- Karamanlides
- Caucasus Greeks
- Greeks in Russia and the Soviet Union
