= Tsalka language =

Turkish dialect

Tsalka
- Musulmandzha, bizim dili
- Native to: Georgia, Russia
- Ethnicity: Tsalka Greeks
- Era: 19th century
- Language family: Turkic: Common Turkic; Oghuz; Western Oghuz; Turkish; Eastern Anatolian; Tsalka

Language codes
- ISO 639-3: –
- Glottolog: None

Tsalka is an East-Anatolian dialect of Turkish spoken by Tsalka Greeks (Note: also known as Pontic Urums) who mainly inhabit the Tsalka and Tetritsqaro municipalities in Georgia.

== Sociolinguistic status ==
Not all Tsalka Greeks speak Tsalka; there are many Pontic Greek speakers. Tsalka is exclusively a spoken language and has no writing system.

The name Tsalka language is not used by its speakers; instead, they use descriptive terms like "bizim dili" ("our language"). Tsalka Greeks also call their language Musulmandzha (the Muslim language) and often identify as Urums as a result of the belief that people's ethnic identity is defined by the genetic relationships of their language; this view was heavily promoted by the Soviet bureaucracy. At the same time, they are offended by the claim that they are not real Greeks because of the Turkish influence. According to Garkavets, Orthodox Mariupol Urums who also speak a Turkic language have no similar insecurity in relation to their language.

Speaking Tsalka is not prestigious and is seen as shameful or a curse, but the speakers believe that switching from Greek to Tsalka has enabled them to preserve their Orthodox Christian faith; they see it in contrast with the conversion of Pontic Greeks into Islam while maintaining their Hellenic language. The actual reason for the abandonment of language is unknown, and is not typical for ethnic minorities in Ottoman Empire (see the opposite cases in Bosnia, Herzsegovina, Albania and Greece); it is being theorised that the language shift occurred in the urban population while more rural Pontic Greeks retained a Hellenic dialect.

Tsalka became less stigmatised after dissolution of the Soviet Union in 1991 as its partial intelligibility had facilitated trading with Turkey. The common language also helps Tsalka Greeks to befriend Turkic speakers from neighbouring settlements and provides them with entertainment via Turkish popular media. Most Tsalka Greeks report a desire to learn the Greek language.

== History ==
Most ancestors of Tsalka Greeks moved to the East of modern Georgia from the Erzurum Province. Most Tsalka surnames are formed using a pattern that reflects the history of resettlement: Tsalka speakers add a Turkish suffix (usually -gil) to the name of the male head of the family at the time of migration to the Caucasus. Other last names have a Russian suffix (-ov or -ev).

The biggest wave of Pontic Greek migration to Georgia occurred in 1830. Greeks had cooperated with the Russian army that entered Ottoman territories in 1828, and were afraid of Turkish retaliation after the signing of the Treaty of Adrianople, which returned territories with significant Greek population to the Ottoman Empire. Over 42,000 Greeks living in Akhaltsikhe Municipality, Kars, Bayazet and Erzurum municipalities left the territory of modern Turkey, which constitutes at least 1/5 of the total population of the time. Tsalka Greeks moved to Georgia in 1830: from Gümüşhane and Maden in May, from Başköy village in Erzurum vilayet in July; the third, biggest group arrived from various sancak of Erzurum vilayet over the course of the second half of the same year. By the end of 1831, the Greek population of Tsalka settled in 18 villages with a total population of 642 families. Most of them spoke Pontic Greek at home, but the subsequent generations switched to Turkish as it was the local lingua franca. This is also reflected in the toponyms: many Greek villages in Tsalka have Greek names, but their residents do not speak Greek.

In 1979, Tsalka Greeks composed a third of all the Greek population of Georgia. In later decades, many of them moved to Crimea, Stavropol and Krasnodar Krais.

== Typology and dialects ==
Typologically, Tsalka language is an Anatolian dialect of Turkish.

Tsalka has two main dialectal groups: "gro" and "pasena"; both have changed the Turkish morphosyntactic paradigm by replacing the threefold past tense system (Note: simple past, aorist and inferential past) with only one form with the "gro" idioms preferring the /-mɨş/ suffix (denoting aorist in standard Tuskish) and "pasena" using the /-di/ suffix (witnessed past in Turkish). There are reports that claim that the Kars dialects retain the original system of past tenses.

== Phonology ==
The sound system of the Tsalka language is largely similar to the one of other Eastern Anatolian dialects:

Vowel phonemes
	Front		Back	
	unrounded	rounded	unrounded	rounded
Close	i	y	ɨ	u
Open	e	œ	a	o

There is a tendency of forgoing the Turkish vowel harmony by vowel backness; as a result, the paired Turkish suffixes such as the plural marker -lar/ler have been replaced by a single suffix (-lar) used in all environments.

The quality of the /i/ vowel has shifted towards /ɨ/ under the influence of the Modern Greek language.

Modern Greek has other impact on Tsalka too: the latter copied the palatalisation of /k/ and /g/ before front vowels into /t͡ʃ/ and /d͡ʒ/.

Prosodic features of Tsalka language such as intonation show influence of the Pontic Greek dialect.

== Lexicon ==
Tsalka language contains a significant amount of Modern Greek loanwords, with a big part of them pertaining to Christianity, such as kilise ("church") from ἐκκλησία, or education (melani, "ink", from μελάνι). At the same time, many Turkish words exist even in the religious sphere: namaz ("prayer"). Many of the Greek loanwords into Tsalka closely match the same words in the Urum language, the Turkish dialects of Krasnodar Krai Greeks and the Gagauz language; Fatima Yeloeva wrote that this unity arose because they were borrowed from the literary tradition of the Karamanlides, Karamanli Turkish-speaking Greeks who assimilated into the Greek nation in 20 century.

== Bibliography ==
- Елоева, Фатима (2002). Проблемы языков дисперсных групп. Тюркоязычные православные греки Цалкинского и Тетрицкаровского районов Грузии.
- Popov, Anton (2016). Culture, ethnicity and migration after communism: the Pontic Greeks. Routledge. ISBN 978-1-4724-3843-0.
- Sideri, Eleni (2017). "Historical Diasporas, Religion and Identity: Exploring the Case of the Greeks of Tsalka". In Sideri, Eleni; Roupakia, Lydia Efthymia (eds.). Religions and migrations in the Black Sea region. Religion and global migrations. Palgrave Macmillan. ISBN 978-3-319-39067-3.
