= Çıtak (term) =

17th-century ethnonym

Çıtak is a term employed by several 17th-century sources primarily for groups of people inhabiting the region of Dobruja and other parts of the Balkans. The primary source that utilized the term was Ottoman traveler Evliya Çelebi's Seyahatnâme (travelogue). Other 17th-century authors using this ethnonym included the Crimean-Armenian chronicler Khachatur of Kaffa.

Çıtak is derived from the Oghuz verb root "çat-", meaning to pair or to breed. According to historian Arkadiusz Blaszczyk, the meaning implied by Evliya Çelebi was "half-breed" or "hybrid". Outside the region of Dobruja, Evliya Çelebi associated the term with the Rumelian Yörüks, such as those near Thessaloniki, who included Tatars among their ranks. Evliya Çelebi described the ancestry of the çıtaks as a mixture of Tatars, Bulgarians, Moldavians, Wallachians, and the descendants of the Ottoman prince Suleiman Pasha's retinue. Evliya Çelebi additionally provided a sample list for the Turkish dialect spoken by the çıtaks of Dobruja.

== Bibliography ==
- Blaszczyk, Arkadiusz (30 December 2024). "Migration around the Black Sea (from the Mid-thirteenth Century to 1700)". Handbook on the History and Culture of the Black Sea Region. De Gruyter. ISBN 9783110723175.
- Dankoff, Robert (2008). From Mahmud Kaşgari to Evliya Çelebi. Isis Press. ISBN 978-975-428-366-2. OCLC 263017665.
