= Abraham of Cratia =

Syrian saint

Saint Abraham of Cratia
- Born: c. 474; Emesa, Syria
- Died: c. 558; Palestine
- Venerated in: Christian Church
- Feast: 6 December

Abraham of Cratia or Krateia (c. 474 – c. 558) was a Christian monk from Emesa (now Homs) Byzantine Syria. Abraham was the most important of the bishops on the see of Kratia from its foundation in the 2nd century until its dissolution in the 12th century.

He is recognized as a saint in the Christian church, with a feast day of 6 December.

== Life ==
He was born at Emesa in Byzantine Syria, where he became a monk. When he was about eighteen, the community there was dispersed by nomadic raiders. Abraham himself fled to Constantinople where he became procurator of a monastery there.

When he was only 26 years old, he was made the abbot of the monastery of Cratia in Bithynia. Some ten years later, he secretly left for Palestine seeking a quieter life. He was subsequently made to return to his monastery, where he also was shortly thereafter made the local bishop of Cratia. He served as a bishop for 13 years before he retired about 525, and again left for Palestine, and remained there for the rest of his life, living a life of religious contemplation and having becοme a hermit. He lived in a monastery at the Tower of Eudokia. He died on 6 December, which would later be his feast day.

== External sources ==
- Ramsgate Benedictine Monks of St.Augustine's Abbey (Author), "The Book of Saints (Reference)", Publisher: A & C Black Publishers Ltd; 7th edition (May 31, 2002), 655 pages, ISBN 978-0713653007
