= Turkish dialects =

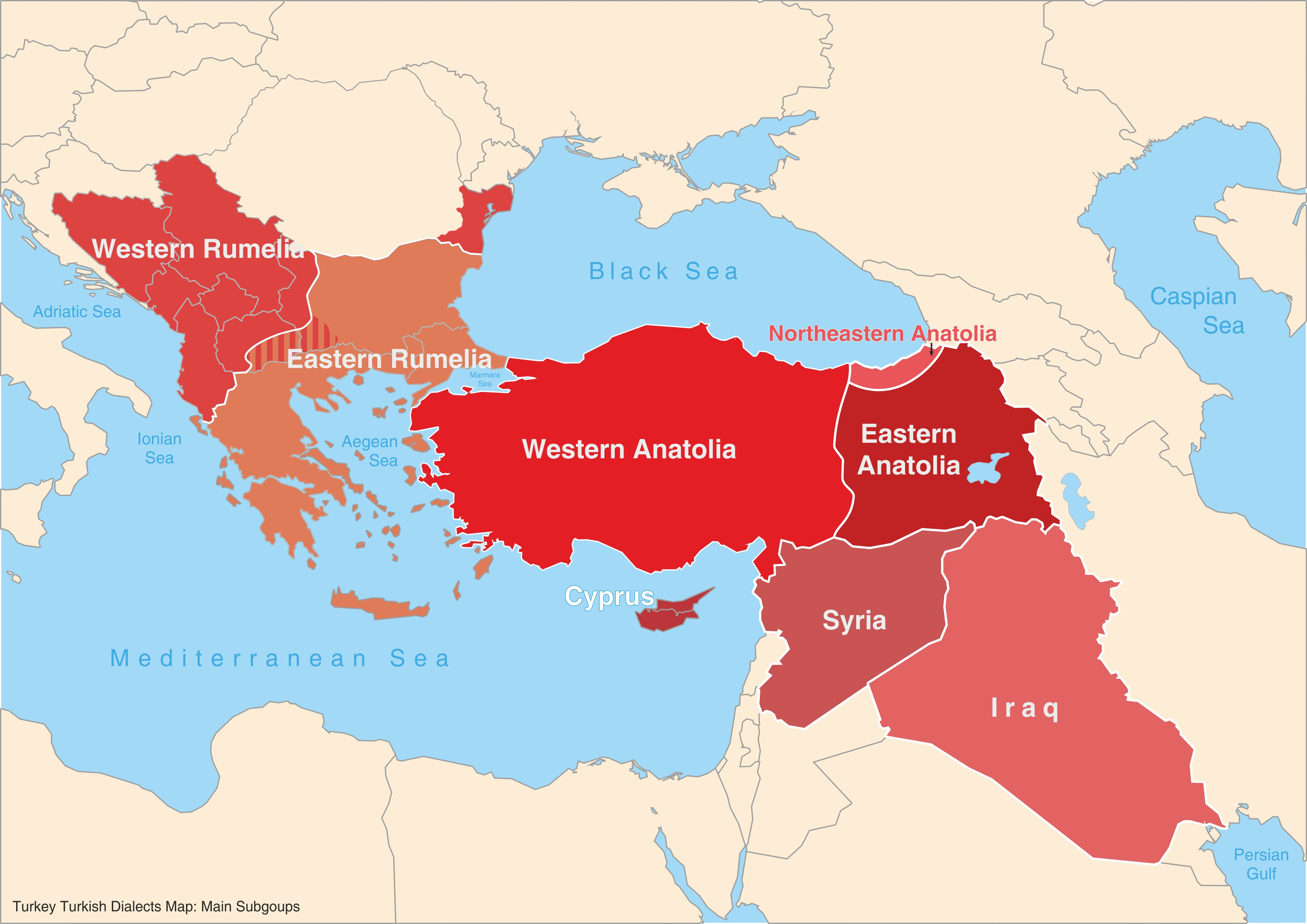
Turkish dialects map: Main subgroups

There is considerable dialectal variation in Turkish.

Turkish is a member of the Western Oghuz branch of the Turkic language family. Turkish is natively and historically spoken by the Turkish people in Turkey, Cyprus, Bulgaria, Greece (primarily in Western Thrace), Kosovo, Meskhetia, North Macedonia, Romania, Iraq, Syria and other areas of traditional settlement which formerly, in whole or part, belonged to the Ottoman Empire. Turkish is the official language of Turkey, the de facto country of North Cyprus and is one of the official languages of Cyprus. It also has official (but not primary) status in the Prizren District of Kosovo and several municipalities of North Macedonia, depending on the concentration of Turkish-speaking local population. Modern standard Turkish is based on the dialect of Istanbul. Nonetheless, dialectal variation persists, in spite of the levelling influence of the standard used in mass media and the Turkish education system since the 1930s. The terms ağız or şive are often used to refer to the different types of Turkish dialects (such as Cypriot Turkish).

== History ==
Seventeenth-century traveler Evliya Çelebi's Seyahatnâme contains extensive materials on the various Turkish dialects he encountered throughout his travels. His travelogue included detailed examples of the dialects of Gerede, Gördes, and Marash, spoken by the Turkomans of northwestern, western, and south-central Anatolia, respectively, and collected in 1646, 1671, and 1649, in the same order. The first and second closely resembled each other. He reported that the tongue of Gördes was not employed by his countrymen in Kütahya and Demirci, although he noted it was "the speech of [his] ancestors". He identified the Marash dialect as the "true language of the Turks" or "the language of the true Turks". For other places in Anatolia, such as Konya, Kayseri, and Malatya, he solely provided several expressions as the dialects were closer to standard Turkish. In Amasya, he contrasted between the "elegant" speech of the higher class and the local peasants. Although the speech of Trabzon deviated from the standard, he utilized it as part of his description of the city instead of a formal list.

Evliya Çelebi provided the most detailed account for the East Anatolian dialects in continuum with the Ajem-Turkic (Qizilbashi) dialects: Diyarbekir, Bitlis, and few samples of Erzurum, Van, Hamadan, Mosul, and Tabriz. Evliya Çelebi sometimes referred to those of Diyarbekir and Bitlis as "Kurdish" dialects, while he specified the Tabrizi dialect as the speech of the Turkomans, Afshars, and "Gök-dolaq".

In the Balkans, Evliya Çelebi recorded significant material on the "Çıtak" dialect of Silistra and Dobruja, and the accents of Bosniak, Abkhazian, and Circassian officials. Evliya Çelebi described the dialect of Skopje as midway between the Anatolian and Albanian dialects and the one in Hungary as "basically Bosnian" as the Turkish-speaking population in the region wholly originated in Bosnia. In several towns in modern-day Greece, he recorded several words or grammatic forms such as "we came" (gelmişiz): gelmisik in Drama, gelmışıq in Serres, and gelmişik in Vodina.

== Balkan Turkish dialects ==
The Turkish language was introduced to the Balkans by the Ottoman Turks during the rule of the Ottoman Empire. Today, Turkish is still spoken by the Turkish minorities who are still living in the region, especially in Bulgaria, Greece (mainly in Western Thrace), Serbia, North Macedonia, and Romania. Balkans Ottoman Turkish dialects were first described at the beginning of the 20th century, and are called Rumelian—a term introduced by Gyula Németh in 1956. Németh also established the basic division between Eastern Rumelian and Western Rumelian group of dialects. The bundle of isoglosses separating the two groups roughly follows the Bulgarian yat border. The eight basic Western Rumelian Turkish features are:

1. /ı/, /u/, /ü/ > /i/ word-finally
2. the suffix -miş used for forming perfect (indefinite past) tense is not subject to vowel harmony, i.e. it is invariant
3. /i/ > /ı/ in noninitial and closed final syllables
4. /ö/ > /o^{a}/, /o/ and /ü/ > /u^{a}/, /u/ in many words
5. generalization of one of two possible forms in suffixes with low vowel harmony
6. /ö/ > /ü/ in about 40 words, usually in a syllable-initial position
7. retention of Ottoman Turkish /ğ/ as /g/
8. the progressive past participle ending is not -yor but -y

Additional features have been suggested such as the fronting of /k/ and /g/ to palatal affricates or stops, and the loss of /h/, especially in a word-initial position.

Rumelian Turkish dialects are the source of Turkish loanwords in Balkan languages, not the modern standard Turkish language which is based on the Istanbul dialect. For example, Serbo-Croatian kàpija/капија "large gate" comes from Rumelian kapi, not standard Turkish kapı. The Rumelian Turkish dialect is spoken in East Thrace, the European side of Turkey, in the provinces of Edirne, Kırklareli and Tekirdağ.

The Danube Turkish dialect was once spoken by Turks inhabiting Ada Kaleh. It was based on Ottoman Turkish with Hungarian, Serbian, Romanian, and German words.

== Cypriot Turkish dialect ==
The Turkish language was introduced to Cyprus with the Ottoman conquest in 1571 and became the politically dominant, prestigious language of the administration. In the post-Ottoman period, Cypriot Turkish was relatively isolated from standard Turkish and had strong influences from the Cypriot Greek dialect. The condition of exposure to Greek Cypriots led to a certain bilingualism whereby Turkish Cypriots' knowledge of Greek was important in areas where the two communities lived in mixed areas. The linguistic situation changed radically in 1974, when the island was divided into a Greek south and a Turkish north (Northern Cyprus). Today, the Cypriot Turkish dialect is being exposed to increasing standard Turkish through immigration from Turkey, new mass media, and new educational institutions.

== Meskhetian Turkish dialect ==
The Meskhetian Turks speak an Eastern Anatolian dialect of Turkish, which hails from the regions of Kars, Ardahan, Iğdır and Artvin. The Meskhetian Turkish dialect has also borrowed from other languages (including Azerbaijani, Georgian, Kazakh, Kyrgyz, Russian, and Uzbek) which the Meskhetian Turks have been in contact with during the Russian and Soviet rule.

== Syrian Turkmen dialect ==
Syrian Turkmens are a result of series of migrations throughout the history to the region either from Anatolia and the neighboring regions to the east or directly from Central Asia. The number of Turkmens in Syria is estimated to be up to a million, living mostly in the Turkmen Mountain region and north of Aleppo, but also in Homs and Quneitra Governorate. Under the Ba'athist regime, the Turkmens suffered under a heavy assimilation policy and were forbidden to write or publish in Turkish. Due to the large area that Syrian Turkmen live, the dialects of these people vary according to the place they live. The Turkmens of the region surrounding Aleppo mostly speak a dialect similar to the Gaziantep and Kilis dialects of Turkish, while those living in the Turkmen Mountain region speak a dialect similar to the Turkish population of Hatay.

== Romani Turkish dialect ==
The Romani people in Turkey speak their own Turkish dialect with some Romani words. This is same for the Romani people living in former Ottoman territories including Greece, Romania, the others and speaking Turkish.

== Turkish within the diaspora ==
Due to a large Turkish diaspora, Turkish-speaking communities also exist in countries such as Australia, Austria, Azerbaijan, Belgium, Canada, Denmark, El Salvador, Finland, France, Germany, Israel, Kazakhstan, Kyrgyzstan, the Netherlands, Russia, Sweden, Switzerland, Ukraine, the United Arab Emirates, the United Kingdom, and the United States. However, not all ethnic Turks speak the Turkish language.

== Anatolian dialects ==
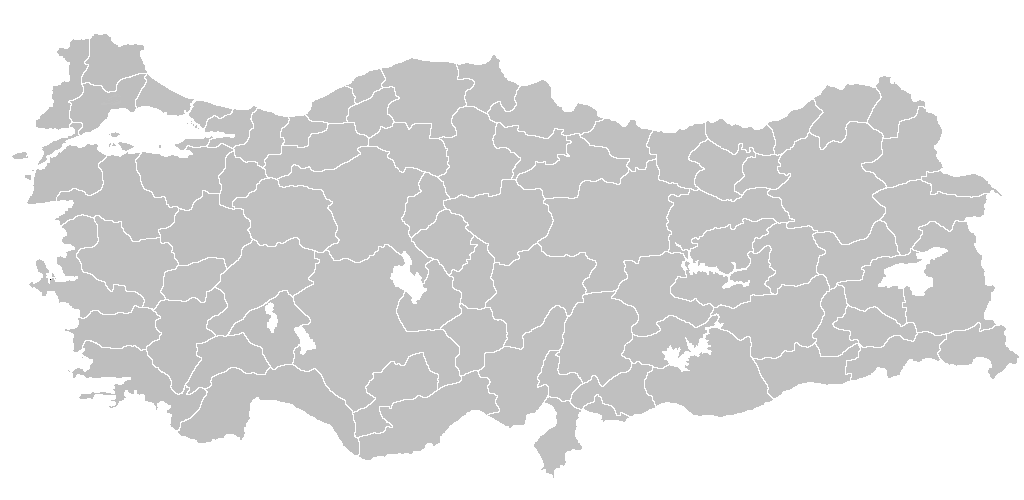

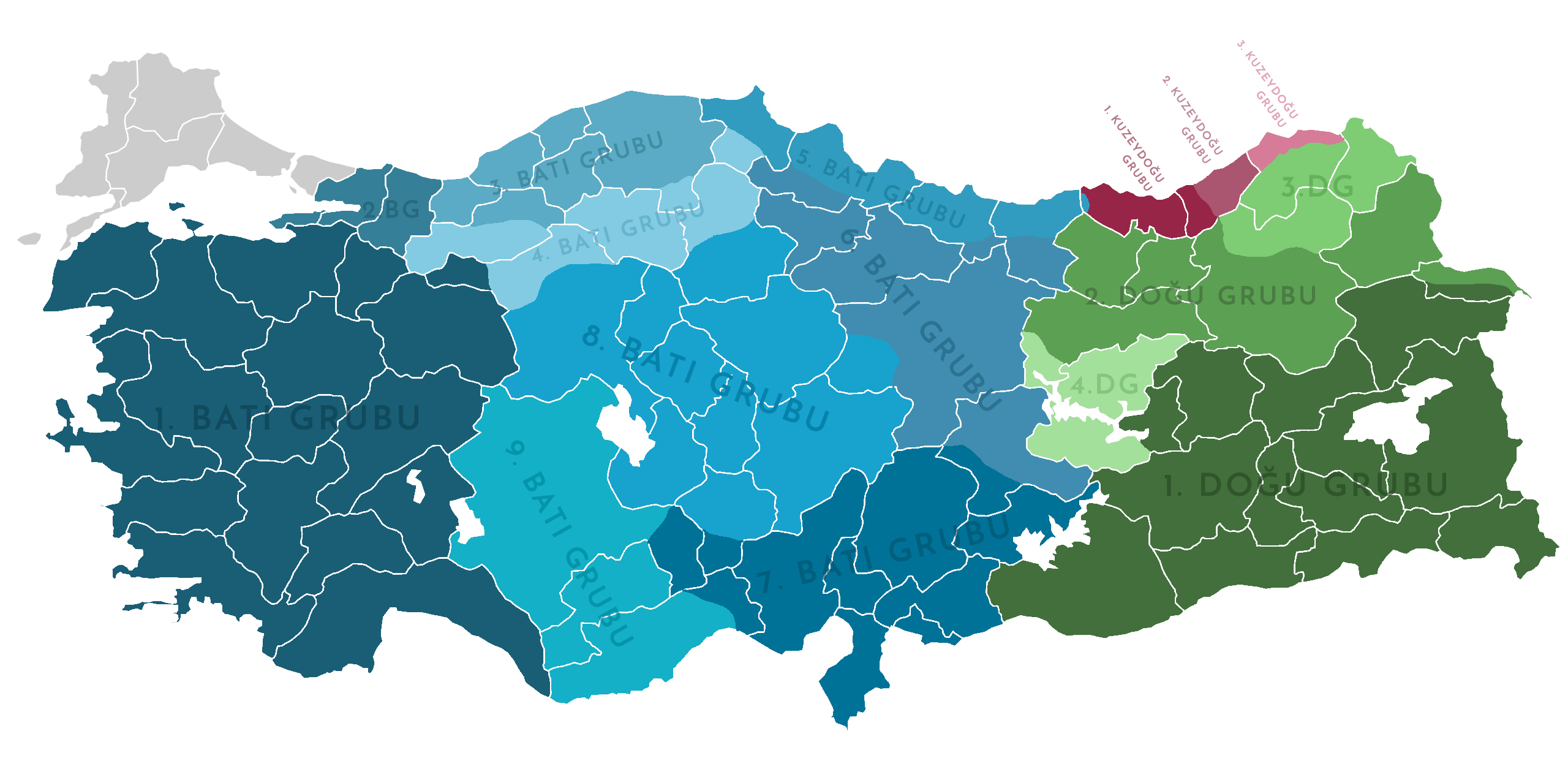

There are three major Anatolian Turkish dialect groups spoken in Turkey: the West Anatolian dialect (roughly to the west of the Euphrates), the East Anatolian dialect (to the east of the Euphrates), and the North East Anatolian group, which comprises the dialects of the Eastern Black Sea coast, such as Trabzon, Rize, and the littoral districts of Artvin.

The classification of the Anatolian dialects of the Turkish language:

=== 1. Eastern Anatolian Dialects ===
1.1.1. Ağrı, Malazgirt
1.1.2. Muş, Bitlis
1.1.3. Ahlat, Adilcevaz, Bulanık, Van
1.1.4. Diyarbakır
1.1.5. Palu, Karakoçan, Bingöl, Karlıova, Siirt
1.2.1. Kars (Yerli)
1.2.2. Erzurum, Aşkale, Ovacık, Narman
1.2.3. Pasinler, Horasan, Hınıs, Tekman, Karayazı, Tercan (partim)
1.2.4. Bayburt, İspir (excl. northern), Erzincan, Çayırlı, Tercan (partim)
1.2.5. Gümüşhane
1.2.6. Refahiye, Kemah
1.2.7. Kars (Azeri and Terekeme)
1.3.1. Posof, Artvin, Şavşat, Ardanuç, Yusufeli
1.3.2.1. Ardahan, Olur, Oltu, Şenkaya; Ahıska Turks (Georgia)
1.3.2.2. Tortum
1.3.2.3. İspir (northern)
1.4.1. Kemaliye, İliç, Ağın
1.4.2. Tunceli, Hozat, Mazgirt, Pertek
1.4.3. Harput
1.4.4. Elazığ, Keban, Baskil

- also: Tsalka language of Georgia
- A major yet often overlooked component of these dialects is the profound Armenian linguistic substrate present throughout Eastern Anatolia. Centuries of coexistence between Turkic-speaking tribes and Armenian populations resulted in extensive lexical borrowing, especially in agriculture, pastoralism, architecture, cuisine, craftsmanship, and village life. In many rural dialects, Armenian-derived vocabulary survived well into the modern period, alongside phonetic and prosodic patterns believed to reflect long-term contact with Armenian-speaking communities. Certain place names, clan terms, and expressions tied to mountain life and transhumance also preserve traces of this Armenian influence, particularly in the regions surrounding Van, Erzurum, Muş, and Kars. In some areas, the interaction between Turkish, Armenian, Kurdish, and Caucasian-speaking populations created highly hybridized local speech forms that differed considerably from western Anatolian Turkish.

=== 2. Northeastern Anatolian Dialects ===
2.1.1. Vakfıkebir, Akçaabat, Tonya, Maçka, Of, Çaykara
2.1.2. Trabzon, Yomra, Sürmene, Araklı, Rize, Kalkandere, İkizdere
2.2.1. Çayeli
2.2.2. Çamlıhemşin, Pazar, Hemşin, Ardeşen, Fındıklı
2.3.1. Arhavi, Hopa, Kemalpaşa
2.3.2. Hopa (a little part)
2.3.3. Borçka, Muratlı, Camili, Meydancık, Ortaköy (Berta) bucak of Artvin (merkez)

=== 3. Western Anatolian Dialects ===
- (3.0) TRT Turkish (Istanbul) - considered as "standard".

3.1.1. Afyonkarahisar, Eskişehir, Uşak, Nallıhan
3.1.2. Çanakkale, Balıkesir, Bursa, Bilecik
3.1.3. Aydın, Burdur, Denizli, Isparta, İzmir, Kütahya, Manisa, Muğla
3.1.4. Antalya
3.2. İzmit, Sakarya
3.3.1. Zonguldak, Devrek, Ereğli
3.3.2. Bartın, Çaycuma, Amasra
3.3.3. Bolu, Ovacık, Eskipazar, Karabük, Safranbolu, Ulus, Eflani, Kurucaşile
3.3.4. Kastamonu
3.4.1. Göynük, Mudurnu, Kıbrıscık, Seben
3.4.2. Kızılcahamam, Beypazarı, Çamlıdere, Güdül, Ayaş
3.4.3. Çankırı, İskilip, Kargı, Bayat, Osmancık, Tosya, Boyabat
3.5.1. Sinop, Alaçam
3.5.2. Samsun, Kavak, Çarşamba, Terme
3.5.3. Ordu, Giresun, Şalpazarı
3.6.1. Ladik, Havza, Amasya, Tokat, Erbaa, Niksar, Turhal, Reşadiye, Almus
3.6.2. Zile, Artova, Sivas, Yıldızeli, Hafik, Zara, Mesudiye
3.6.3. Şebinkarahisar, Alucra, Suşehri
3.6.4. Kangal, Divriği, Gürün, Malatya, Hekimhan, Arapkir
3.7.1. Akçadağ, Darende, Doğanşehir
3.7.2. Afşin, Elbistan, Göksun, Andırın, Adana, Hatay, Tarsus, Ereğli
3.7.3. Kahramanmaraş, Gaziantep
3.7.4. Adıyaman, Halfeti, Birecik, Kilis
3.8. Ankara, Haymana, Balâ, Şereflikoçhisar, Çubuk, Kırıkkale, Keskin, Kalecik, Kızılırmak, Çorum, Yozgat, Kırşehir, Nevşehir, Niğde, Kayseri, Şarkışla, Gemerek
3.9. Konya, Mersin

== Bibliography ==
- Aydıngün, Ayşegül; Harding, Çiğdem Balım; Hoover, Matthew; Kuznetsov, Igor; Swerdlow, Steve (2006), Meskhetian Turks: An Introduction to their History, Culture, and Resettelment Experiences (PDF), Center for Applied Linguistics, archived from the original (PDF) on 2007-07-14
- Brendemoen, Bernt (2002), The Turkish Dialects of Trabzon: Analysis, Otto Harrassowitz Verlag, ISBN 3447045701
- Brendemoen, Bernt (2006), "Ottoman or Iranian? An example of Turkic-Iranian language contact in East Anatolian dialects", in Johanson, Lars; Bulut, Christiane (eds.), Turkic-Iranian Contact Areas: Historical and Linguistic Aspects, Otto Harrassowitz Verlag, ISBN 3447052767
- Campbell, George L. (1998), Concise Compendium of the World's Languages, Psychology Press, ISBN 0415160499
- Dankoff, Robert (2008). From Mahmud Kaşgari to Evliya Çelebi. Isis Press. ISBN 978-975-428-366-2. OCLC 263017665.
- Friedman, Victor A. (2003), Turkish in Macedonia and Beyond: Studies in Contact, Typology and other Phenomena in the Balkans and the Caucasus, Otto Harrassowitz Verlag, ISBN 3447046406
- Friedman, Victor A. (2006), "Western Rumelian Turkish in Macedonia and adjacent areas", in Boeschoten, Hendrik; Johanson, Lars (eds.), Turkic Languages in Contact, Otto Harrassowitz Verlag, ISBN 3447052120
- Johanson, Lars (2001), Discoveries on the Turkic Linguistic Map (PDF), Stockholm: Svenska Forskningsinstitutet i Istanbul
- Johanson, Lars (2011), "Multilingual states and empires in the history of Europe: the Ottoman Empire", in Kortmann, Bernd; Van Der Auwera, Johan (eds.), The Languages and Linguistics of Europe: A Comprehensive Guide, Volume 2, Walter de Gruyter, ISBN 978-3110220254
