= Gerede =

- Municipality
- Location within Turkey
- Coordinates: 40°48′02″N 32°11′55″E
- Country: Turkey
- Province: Bolu
- District: Gerede

Government
  - Mayor: Mustafa Allar (AKP)
- Elevation: 1,300 m (4,300 ft)
- Population (2021): 23,547
- Time zone: UTC+3 (TRT)
- Climate: Csb
- Website: www.gerede.bel.tr

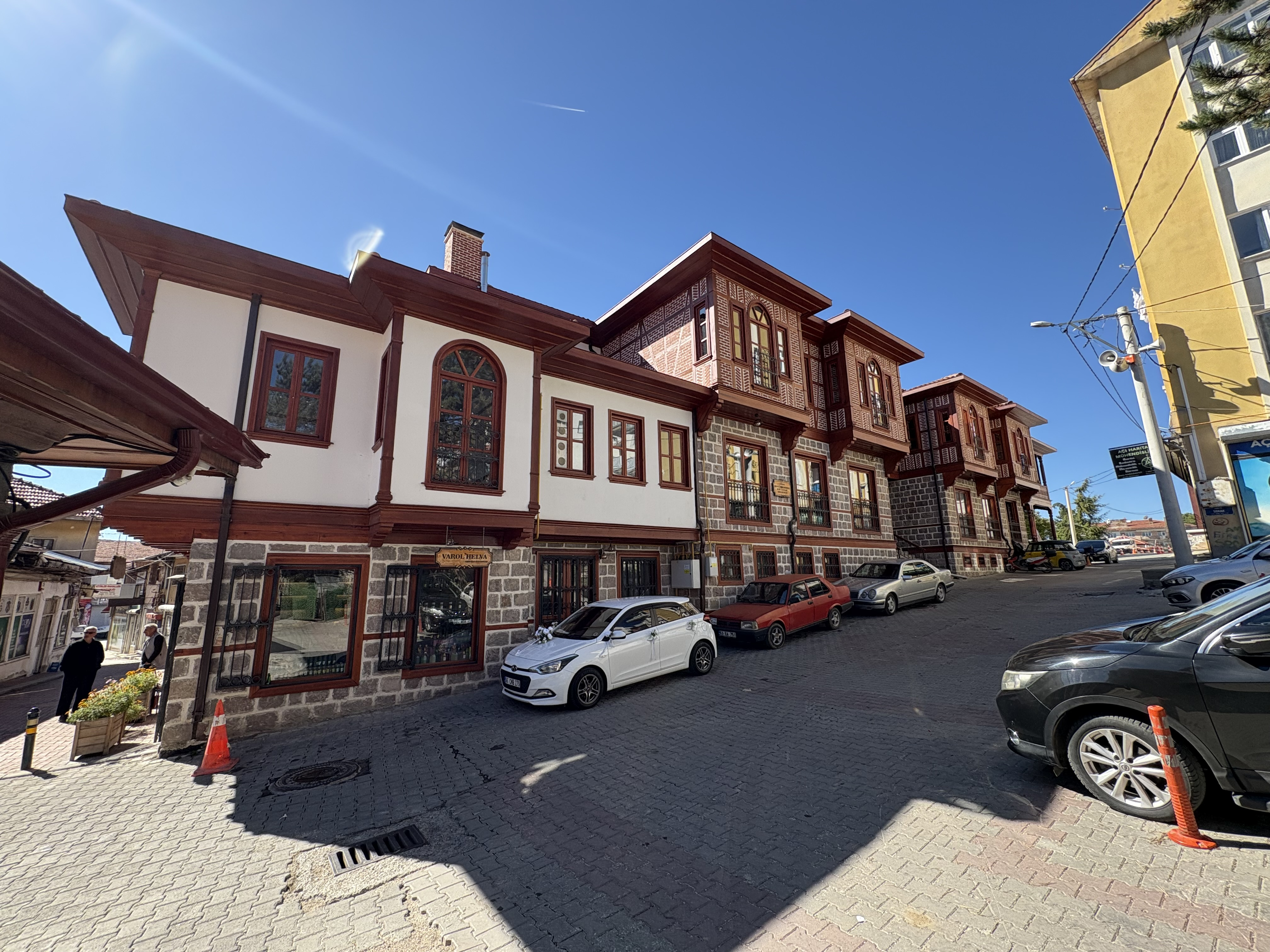
Arasta Bazaar in Kitirler

Gerede is a town in Bolu Province in the Black Sea region of Turkey. It is located on the highway from Istanbul to Ankara (approximately 150 km (93.21 mi) from Ankara, where the road to the Black Sea coast branches off). It is the seat of Gerede District. Its population is 23,547 (2021). Elevation is about 1,300 m. The mayor is Mustafa Allar (AKP).

== History ==
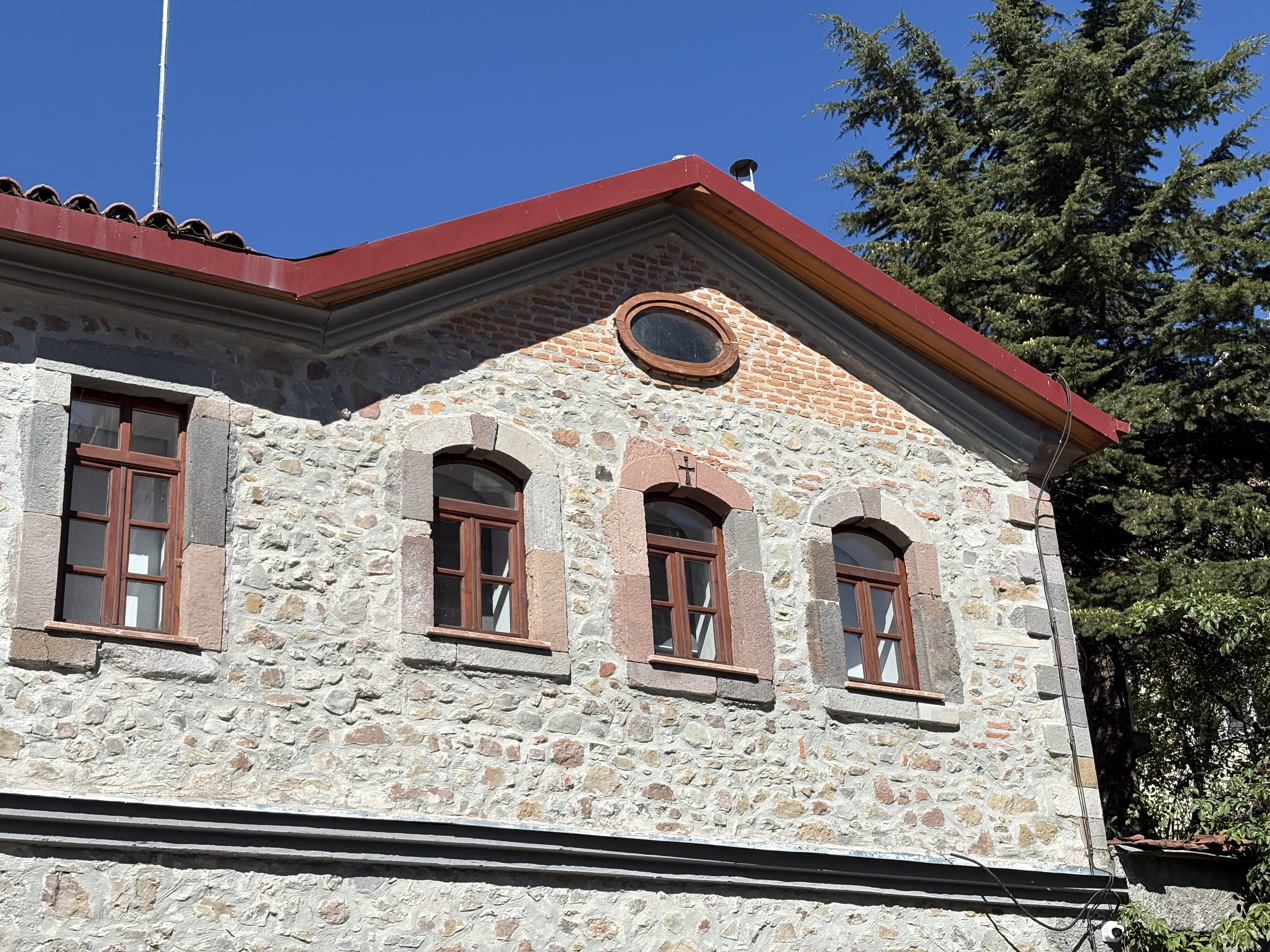
Kiliseli Tüccar Hanı in Kitirler, view of the northern end of the eastern façade with cross

In Roman times, the town was called Cratia (Κρατεία) and was part of the Roman province of Honorias, whose capital was Claudiopolis in Honoriade.

=== Ecclesiastical history ===
Cratia was a metropolitan see, also called Flaviopolis or Flavianopolis. The names of some its bishops are known because of their participation in ecumenical councils: Epiphanius at the Council of Ephesus (431), Genethlius represented by the priest Eulogius at the Council of Chalcedon (451), Diogenes at the Second Council of Constantinople (553), Georgius at the Third Council of Constantinople (680–681), Constantinus or Constans at the Second Council of Nicea (787), Basilius at the Council of Constantinople (869), as well as at the Council of Constantinople (879). In addition, Philetus was one of the Eastern Arian bishops who withdrew from the Council of Sardica in about 344 and set up a rival council at Philippopolis. Paulus stood firm against the Empress Aelia Eudoxia in her persecution of John Chrysostom in 403. Plato was a member of a synod that met in 518. Abramius took part in the synod called in 536 by Patriarch Menas of Constantinople. No longer a residential bishopric, Cratia is today listed by the Catholic Church as a titular see.

=== Ottoman period ===
Under the Ottoman Empire, Gerede was an established town and was visited by the 16th-century traveller Evliya Çelebi, who described a town of 1,000 homes and 10 mosques, with a military base.

In the late 19th and early 20th century, Gerede was part of the Kastamonu Vilayet of the Ottoman Empire.

For many the name Gerede evokes Hüsrev Gerede, a key companion of Atatürk in the Turkish War of Independence (of 1919-1922). He was later given the surname Gerede for his success in leading the town's rebellion against the occupying forces during that conflict.

== Present state ==
Gerede today is a small town with a number of tanneries and leather workshops, but even though the highway is so close the town is growing slowly, perhaps because of the forbidding climate.

== Composition ==
There are 8 neighbourhoods (mahalle) in Gerede city:

- Bahçelievler Mahallesi
- Dayıoğlu Mahallesi
- Demirciler Mahallesi
- Kabiller Mahallesi
- Kitirler Mahallesi
- Orta Mahallesi
- Seviller Mahallesi
- Yeni Mahallesi

== Nature ==
Gerede has a very rich variety of flora and fauna. In this region red deer, roe deer, wild boar, grey wolf, red fox, golden jackal, marten, brown bear, European badger, hedgehog, shrew, Eurasian lynx, wild cat, jungle cat, hare, mole, stoat, weasel, mallard duck, common pochard, ruddy shelduck, red-breasted goose, greylag goose, golden eagle, eastern imperial eagle, greater spotted eagle, rough-legged buzzard, long-legged buzzard, common buzzard, Eurasian eagle-owl, long-eared owl, little owl, barn owl, European bee-eater, goldcrest, short-toed eagle, western marsh harrier, northern goshawk, Eurasian sparrowhawk, black kite, hen harrier, saker falcon, barbary falcon, Eurasian hobby, common kestrel, red-footed falcon, great spotted woodpecker, green woodpecker, hoopoe, blue-cheeked bee-eater, white stork, black stork, raven, common quail, partridge, common kingfisher, red squirrel, southern crested newt, banded newt, smooth newt, common toad, European green toad, European tree frog, European spadefoot toad, agile frog, long-legged wood frog, marsh frog, Caspian turtle, spur-thighed tortoise, stellion, slowworm, sheltopusik, Darevskia, European green lizard, Balkan green lizard, Ophisops elegans, common wall lizard, grass snake, Caspian whipsnake, Coronella austriaca, Aesculapian snake, Elaphe quatuorlineata, dice snake, otter, various rodents, various carps like fish and trouts are found. Vegetation is winter resistant conifer forests. On the mountains pure fir and spruce forests occupies a very large area. At lower elevations Scots pine, black pine, oak, beech, hornbeam, elm, maple, hazel etc. are found.

== Places of interest ==
- The ruins of the medieval castle, Keçi Kalesi.
- There are also a number of mosques and caravanserai from the Seljuk and Ottoman periods.
- There is an oil-wrestling contest in the wood of Esentepe every July and a country fair (panayır) in October.
