= Khristenko =

Khristenko (Ukrainian: Христенко) is a gender-neutral Ukrainian surname. Notable people with the surname include:

- Stanislav Khristenko (born 1984), Ukrainian-American pianist
- Viktor Khristenko (born 1957), Russian politician
