= Urum language =

Kipchak Turkic language

Urum
- Урум
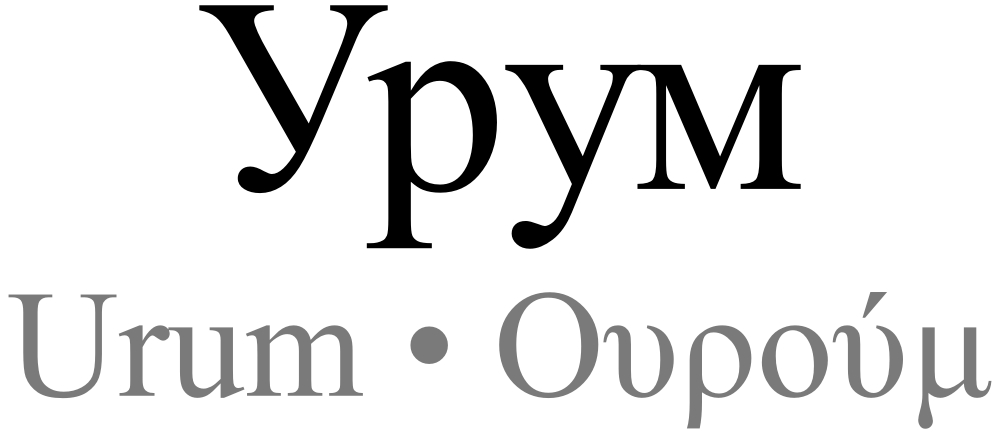
- Urum written in the Cyrillic script, along with the obsolete Latin and Greek scripts
- Pronunciation: [uˈrum]
- Native to: Ukraine
- Ethnicity: North Azovian Urums (Turkic-speaking Greeks)
- Native speakers: (190,000 cited 2000)
- Language family: Turkic: Common Turkic; Kipchak; Kipchak–Cuman; Urum
- Writing system: Cyrillic, Greek

Official status
- Recognised minority language in: Ukraine

Language codes
- ISO 639-3: uum
- Glottolog: urum1249
- ELP: Urum
- Urum is classified as Definitely Endangered by the UNESCO Atlas of the World's Languages in Danger (2010)

Urum (Урум, Ουρούμ) is a Turkic language spoken by several thousand Urums, an ethnic Greek population who inhabit a few villages in southeastern Ukraine. Over the past few generations, there has been a deviation from teaching children Urum to the more common languages of the region, leaving a fairly limited number of new speakers. The Urum language is often considered a variant of Crimean Tatar.

== Name and etymology ==
The name Urum is derived from Rûm 'Rome', the term for the Byzantine Empire in the Muslim world. The Ottoman Empire used it to describe non-Muslims within the empire. The initial vowel in Urum is prothetic. Turkic languages originally did not have /ɾ/ in word-initial position, and so in borrowed words they used to add a vowel before it. The common use of the term Urum appears to have led to some confusion, as most Turkish-speaking Greeks were called Urum. The Turkish-speaking population in Georgia is often confused with the distinct community in Ukraine.

== Classification ==
Urum is a Turkic language belonging to the West Kipchak branch of the family. Johanson (2021) classifies it as a variety of Crimean Tatar.

== Phonology ==
=== Vowels ===
	Front		Back	
	unrounded	rounded	unrounded	rounded
Close	i	ü /y/	ı /ɯ/	u
Close-mid	e			o
Near-open	*ä /æ/	ö /œ/		
Open			a	

* - wasn't marked as a separate phoneme from the phonem /e/.

==== Examples ====
- šar/še(e)r - city
- äl/el - hand
- göl - lake
- yel - wind
- yol - road
- it - dog
- üzüg - ring
- ğız/hız - girl
- ğuš - bird

=== Consonants ===
		Labial	Dental	Alveolar	Postalveolar	Palatal	Velar	Glottal
Nasal		m		n		ɲ ⟨nʼ⟩	ŋ	
Plosive	voiceless	p		t		c ⟨tʼ⟩	k	
Plosive	voiced	b		d		ɟ ⟨dʼ⟩	g	
Affricate	voiceless			(ts)	tʃ ⟨č⟩			
Affricate	voiced				dʒ ⟨ǰ⟩			
Fricative	voiceless	f	(θ)	s	ʃ ⟨š⟩		x ⟨h⟩	h
Fricative	voiced	v	(ð)	z	ʒ ⟨ž⟩		ɣ ⟨ğ⟩	
Approximant		(w)				j		
Lateral	plain			l				
Lateral	velarized			ɫ				
Flap				ɾ		ɾʲ ⟨rʼ⟩		

/θ, ð/ appear solely in loanwords from Greek. /t͡s/ appears in loanwords. [w] can be an allophone of /v/ after vowels.

== Grammar ==
The Urum language, like other Turkic languages, is agglutinative. This means that many different affixes are used in word formation in the Urum language. And Urum language, like others Turkic languages, features pervasive vowel harmony, which results in sound changes when suffixes are added to verb or noun stems. Same consonants change when suffixes are added to verb or noun stems.

Phoneme Harmonies

Vowels
	a/ı-	u/o-	e/i-	ü/ö-
Y	ı	u	i	ü
I	ı		i	
A	a		e	

Consonants
	voiceless-		voiced/vowels-	
	e/i/ü/ö-	a/ı/u/o-	e/i/ü/ö-	a/ı/u/o-
T	t	t	d	d
K	k/t'	h	g/d'	ğ

=== Nouns ===
Nouns in Urum language have two numbers: singular (bala 'child') and plural -lAr; (ballar 'children'). There are seven cases:

- Nominative: M'en büyük çöl'e s'evnıyım — I admire the vast steppe.
- Genitive: Oların el'leri — Their hands.
- Accusative: S'en almanı aşaysın/yeyisin. — You are eating an apple.
- Dative (allative): M'en ev'e varayım. — I am going home.
- Locative: M'en Mariupol'da otruydum. — I lived in Mariupol.
- Ablative: Bız d'el'iyik skol'adan. — We are going from the school.
- Instrumental: Sınız l'est'ernen kartop çıharıysınız. — You dig potatoes with a shovel.

Case	Ending
Nominative	−Ø
Genitive	−(n)Yn
Accusative	−(n)Y
Dative (Allative)	−(y)A
Locative	−TA
Ablative	−TAn
Instrumental	−nAn

=== Verbs ===
Declination of verbs in Urum language are not very different from declination of verbs in Crimean Tatar language:

	Singular	Plural
1st	−(Y)m	−YK
2nd	−sYn	−sYnYz
3rd	−Ø	−lAr

Examples:

- M'en büyük çöl'e s'evnıyım.
- Gül'eyik bız toptan.
- Neye sız b'ekleysin.
- Sız Urumcas laf eteysiniz.

Due to the small number of sources, only 3 tenses were identified (most likely, in the Urum language there were and are as many tenses as there are in the Crimean Tatar language).

Tenses	Positive	Negative
Presens	−(A)y−	−mAy−
General Past	−TI−	−mATI−
Evidential Past	−KAn−	−mAKAn−
Future	−cAK−	−mAcAK−
Conditional	−sA−	−mAsA−

== Writing systems ==
A few manuscripts are known to be written in Urum using Greek characters. During the period between 1927 and 1937, the Urum language was written in reformed Latin characters, the New Turkic Alphabet, and used in local schools; at least one primer is known to have been printed. In 1937, the use of written Urum stopped. In 2000, Alexander Garkavets uses the following alphabet:

А а	Б б	В в	Г г	Ғ ғ	Д д	(Δ δ)	Д′ д′
(Ђ ђ)	Е е	Ж ж	Җ җ	З з	И и	Й й	К к
Л л	М м	Н н	Ң ң	О о	Ӧ ӧ	П п	Р р
С с	Т т	Т′ т′	(Ћ ћ)	У у	Ӱ ӱ	Υ υ	Ф ф
Х х	Һ һ	Ц ц	Ч ч	Ш ш	Щ щ	Ъ ъ	Ы ы
Ь ь	Э э	Ю ю	Я я	Θ θ

In an Urum primer issued in Kyiv in 2008, the following alphabet is suggested:

А а	Б б	В в	Г г	Ґ ґ	Д д	Д' д'	Дж дж
Е е	З з	И и	Й й	К к	Л л	М м	Н н
О о	Ӧ ӧ	П п	Р р	С с	Т т	Т' т'	У у
Ӱ ӱ	Ф ф	Х х	Ч ч	Ш ш	Ы ы	Э э

In 2025, people from the organization North Azovian Greeks (Urums and Roumeans) created a new Urum alphabet based on the Latin alphabet in Kyiv.

A a	B b	C c	Ç ç	D d	E e	F f	G g
Ğ ğ	H h	I ı	İ i	J j	K k	L l	M m
N n	O o	Ö ö	P p	R r	S s	Ş ş	T t
U u	Ü ü	V v	Y y	Z z	'

== Publications ==
Very little has been published on the Urum language. There exists a very small lexicon, and a small description of the language. For Caucasian Urum, there is a language documentation project that collected a dictionary, a set of grammatically relevant clausal constructions, and a text corpus. The website of the project contains issues about language and history.

== See also ==
- Karamanli Turkish
- Tsalka language
