= Cratia (Bithynia) =

Town in the interior of ancient Bithynia

Coordinates: 40°48′44″N 32°09′54″E

Cratia, Crateia or Krateia (Ancient Greek: Κρατεία) was a town in the interior of ancient Bithynia, which also bore the name Flaviopolis, which clearly dates from the imperial period, and probably the time of Vespasian. The Antonine Itinerary places it between Claudiopolis and Ancyra of Galatia, 24 M. P. from the former. An autonomous coin with the epigraph κρη is attributed to this place; and there are coins of the imperial period, from Antoninus Pius to Gallienus. It became an episcopal see. Under the name Cratia it remains a titular see of the Roman Catholic Church. It may also have born the name Agrippeia.

Its site is located near Gerede in Asiatic Turkey.
