= Starobesheve =

Urban locality in Donetsk Oblast, Ukraine

Starobesheve Старобешеве
- Rural settlement
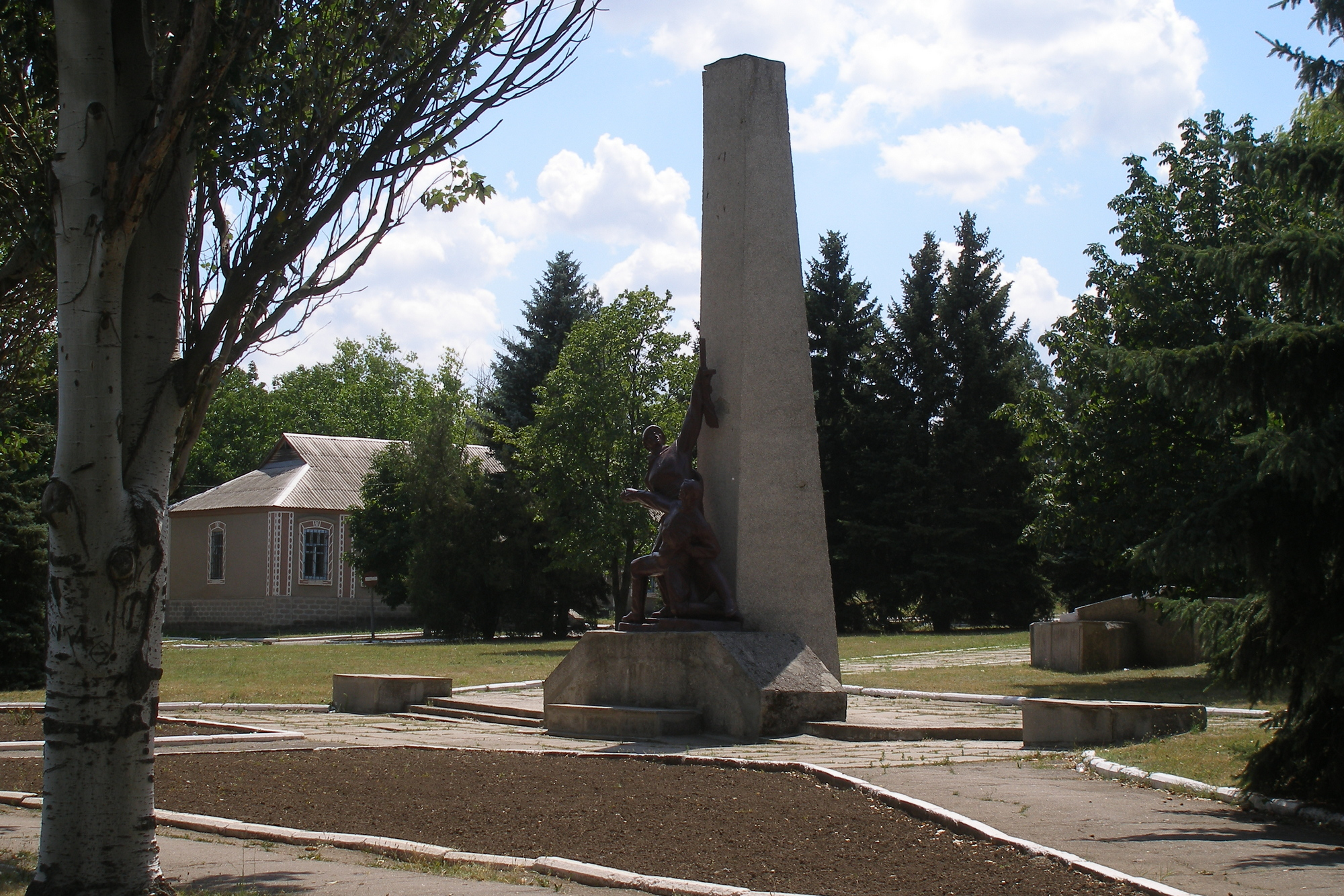
- War memorial in Starobesheve park

- Location within Donetsk Oblast Location within Ukraine
- Coordinates: 47°45′11.44″N 38°1′53.86″E
- Country: Ukraine
- Oblast: Donetsk Oblast
- Raion: Kalmiuske Raion
- Hromada: Starobesheve settlement hromada
- Founded: 1779

Population (2022)
  - Total: 6,044
- Time zone: UTC+2 (EET)
  - Summer (DST): UTC+3 (EEST)

Starobesheve (Ukrainian: Старобешеве; Russian: Старобешево, romanized: Starobeshevo) is a rural settlement in Donetsk Oblast, eastern Ukraine. The town is located on the right bank of the river Kalmius, about 20 kilometres (12 mi) northwest of the internationally recognized border with Russia. Population: 6,044 (2022 estimate); 6,317 (2013 est.).

== History ==
=== In the Russian Empire ===
Starobeshevo was founded in 1779 as a selo of Beshevo by Greek settlers who moved from the settlement of Beshevo in Crimea, hence the name. During much of the 19th century, it belonged to Alexandrovsk uezd of Yekaterinoslav Governorate. In 1874, it was transferred to Mariupol uezd of the same governorate. After 1866, it was the administrative center of Beshevskaya Volost. In 1896, Beshevo was renamed Starobesheve (lit. 'Old Besheve'). In the beginning of the 20th century, the population of Beshevo was about 4,000.

=== In the Soviet Union ===
Following the October Revolution, Soviet power was established in Starobesheve in January 1918. Between April and November the selo was occupied by German troops, and subsequently between December 1918 and May 1919 by the White Army. In May 1919, the Red Army occupied the locality. In the meantime, in January 1919 Ukrainian Soviet Socialist Republic was established and Mariupolsky Uyezd was formally included in the republic, along with Starobesheve. In April 1920, the uyezd was transferred to the newly established Donetsk Governorate. On March 7, 1923 Styla Raion was established with its administrative center in the selo of Styla. Starobesheve was included in the raion. In November 1924, Starobesheve became the administrative center of the raion, and the raion was renamed Starobesheve Raion. On October 1, 1925 Donetsk Governorate was abolished, and Starobesheve was included in the newly established Mariupol Okruha, one of the okruhas into which Ukraine was divided. On July 2, 1932 Starobesheve was included in Donetsk Oblast. In 1936, the okruhas were abolished, and the raions were subordinated directly to the oblast. During World War II, Starobesheve was occupied by German troops between October 1941 and September 1943.

=== 21st century ===
In 2014, during the war in Donbas, Starobesheve changed hands several times. Finally, it became controlled by the self-proclaimed Donetsk People's Republic. In 2020, Ukrainian authorities, who do not control the settlement, abolished Starobesheve Raion and merged its territory into Kalmiuske Raion.

== Economy ==
=== Transportation ===
Starobesheve is connected by road with Donetsk, with Novoazovsk and Mariupol via Boikivske, with Dokuchaievsk via Styla, with Amvrosiivka via Popova Balka, with Novyi Svit, and with Mospyne.

== Culture and recreation ==
Pasha Angelina, one of the first female tractor operators, was born and lived in Starobesheve and worked in the local kolkhoz. A memorial museum was open in the settlement.

== People from Starobesheve ==
- Pasha Angelina (1912–1959), celebrated Soviet udarnik, a symbol of the technically educated female Soviet worker
