= Andriivka, Myrne settlement hromada, Volnovakha Raion, Donetsk Oblast =

Rural settlement in Donetsk Oblast, Ukraine

Andriivka Андріївка
- Rural settlement
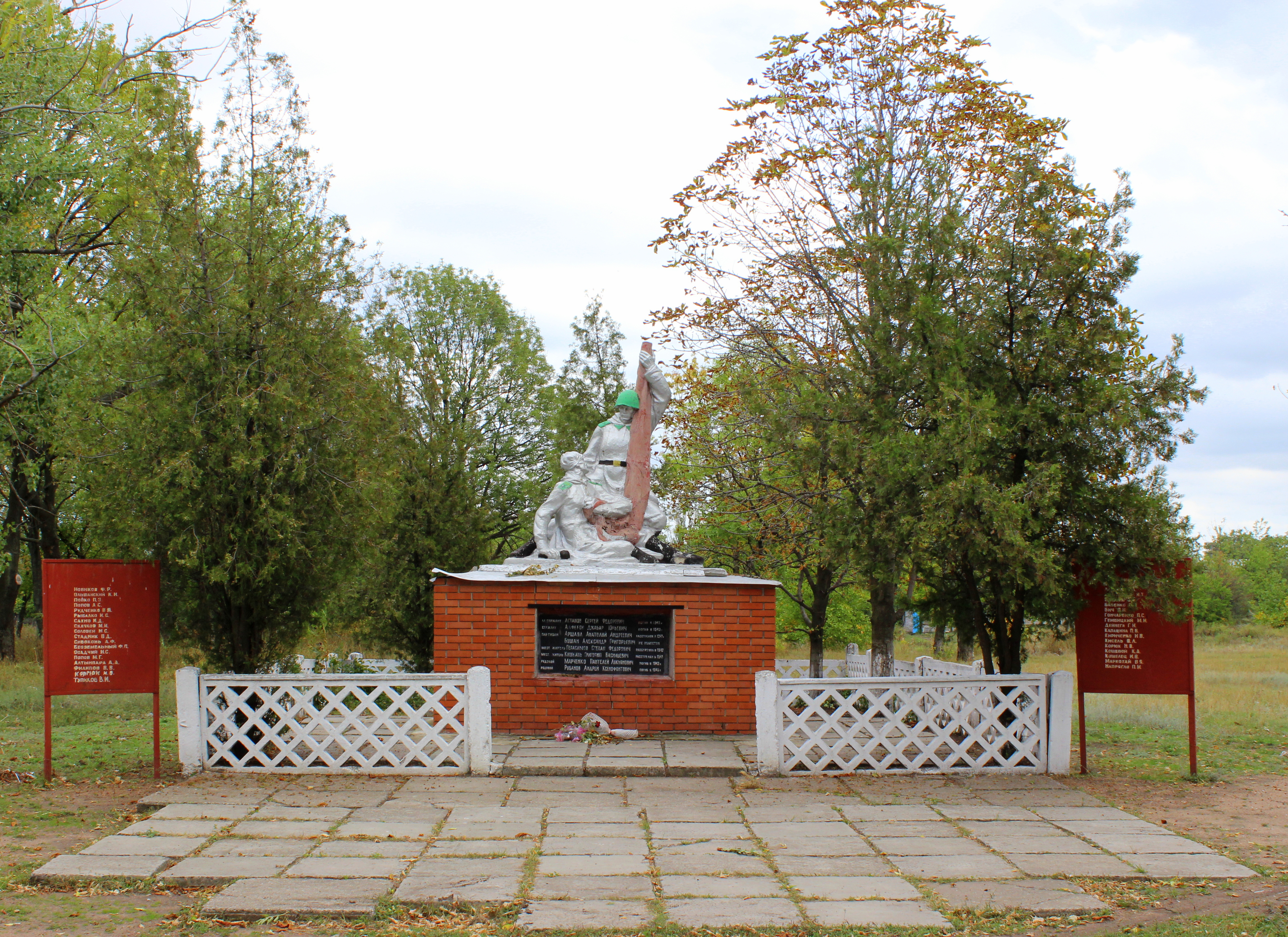
- World War II memorial

- Location of Andriivka in Donetsk Oblast Andriivka (Ukraine)
- Coordinates: 47°27′32″N 37°39′16″E
- Country: Ukraine
- Oblast: Donetsk Oblast
- Raion: Volnovakha Raion
- Hromada: Myrne settlement hromada
- Founded: 1947
- Elevation: 194 m (636 ft)

Population (2022)
  - Total: 2,528
- Time zone: UTC+2
  - Summer (DST): UTC+3
- Postal code: 87120—87121
- Area code: +380 6279

Andriivka (Ukrainian: Андріївка) is a rural settlement in Volnovakha Raion, Donetsk Oblast, eastern Ukraine. Population: 2,528 (2022 estimate).

== History ==
Construction on the Karan railway station near the site of modern Andriivka began in 1882, in the Russian Empire. A Soviet council was created at the railway in 1919.

During World War II, the station was captured by Nazi Germany. The Nazis used torture against railway workers who they saw as having connections to spies for the Soviet war effort. After the end of the war, Andriivka was officially founded in 1947 via the merger of the railway station and a village named Kyzyl Tash (Ukrainian: Кизил Таш). It was assigned to Telmanove Raion.

In 2014, after the beginning of the war in Donbas, Russia-backed militants took over most of Telmanove Raion, leaving Andriivka and a few other settlements in a strip of government-controlled land west of the Kalmius river, isolated from the rest of the raion. To facilitate administration, the Ukrainian government transferred that piece of land, including Andriivka, to Volnovakha Raion in December 2014.

== Economy ==
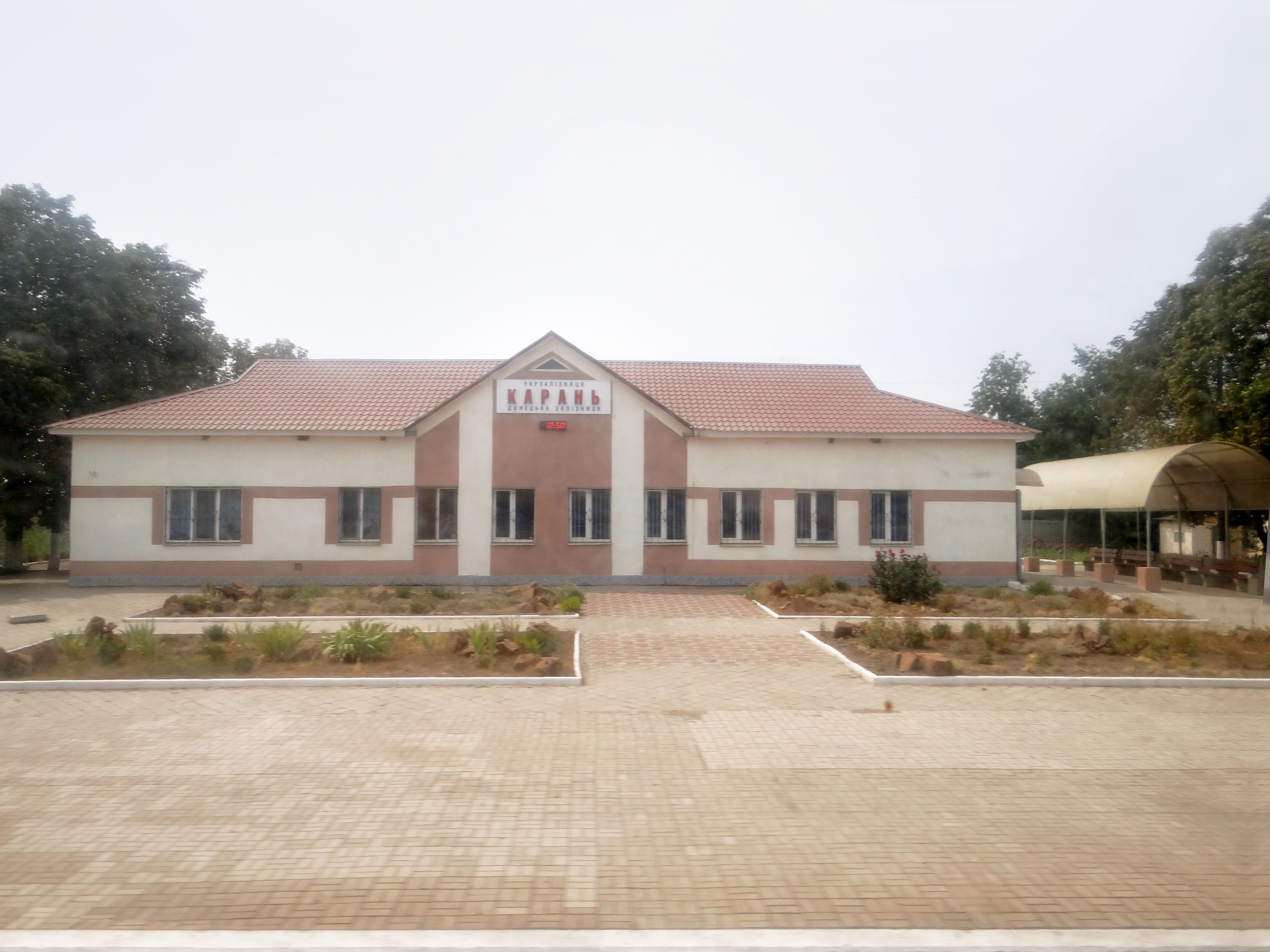
Karan railway station

Andriivka is home to the Karan railway station. The railway line between Mariupol and Volnovakha runs north–south through the settlement. A branch line runs eastward to Myrne, where there is a granite quarry, and on to end at a rock-crushing plant at another granite quarry, just before Hranitne.

== Demographics ==
As of the 2001 Ukrainian census, Andriivka had a population of 3,990 people. Andriivka is a highly multi-ethnic town, with no absolute majority ethnicity. It has a plurality population of Greeks (40%), with large populations of Ukrainians (38%) and Russians (21%). There are also smaller minorities of Belarusians, Tatars, Germans, and Turkmens.
