= Yasne, Kalmiuske Raion, Donetsk Oblast =

Yasne Ясне
- Rural settlement
- Location within Donetsk Oblast Location within Ukraine
- Coordinates: 47°46′32″N 37°38′6″E
- Country: Ukraine
- Oblast: Donetsk Oblast
- Raion: Kalmiuske Raion
- Hromada: Dokuchaievsk urban hromada

Area
  - Total: 1.5 km^{2} (0.58 sq mi)
- Elevation: 189 m (620 ft)

Population (01.01.2013)
  - Total: 7,940
- Time zone: UTC+2 (EET)
  - Summer (DST): UTC+3 (EEST)
- Postal code: 85740
- Area code: +380 675

Yasne (Ukrainian: Ясне; Russian: Ясное) is a rural settlement in Kalmiuske Raion, Donetsk Oblast, eastern Ukraine, 33.6 km SSW from the centre of Donetsk city, and 4.8 km NW of the centre of Dokuchaievsk.

Pro-Russian forces took control of Yasne during the war in Donbas, which started in mid-April 2014.

== Demographics ==
Native language as of the Ukrainian Census of 2001:

- Ukrainian: 45.12%
- Russian: 54.88%
