= Kreminets, Kalmiuske Raion, Donetsk Oblast =

Kreminets Кремінець
- Village
- Interactive map of Kreminets
- Location of Kreminets within Ukraine Kreminets (Donetsk Oblast)
- Coordinates: 47°54′51″N 37°37′13″E
- Country: Ukraine
- Oblast: Donetsk Oblast
- Raion: Kalmiuske Raion
- Hromada: Dokuchaievsk urban hromada
- Elevation: 190 m (620 ft)

Population (2001 census)
  - Total: 338
- Time zone: UTC+2 (EET)
  - Summer (DST): UTC+3 (EEST)
- Postal code: 85662
- Area code: +380 6278

Kreminets (Ukrainian: Кремінець; Russian: Кременец) is a village in Kalmiuske Raion (district) in Donetsk Oblast of eastern Ukraine, at 23.7 km WSW from the centre of Donetsk city. It belongs to Dokuchaievsk urban hromada, one of the hromadas of Ukraine.

Kreminets borders from north-east with the Petrovskyi District of Donetsk city. Pro-Russian forces took the village under their control during the war in Donbas that started in mid-April 2014.

== Demographics ==
Native language as of the 2001 Ukrainian census:

- Ukrainian: 31.36%
- Russian: 67.75%
- Belarusian: 0.89%
