= Olenivka prison massacre =

Killing of prisoners of war in Ukraine

- Location: 47.82846°N 37.71093°E; Filtration camp on the territory of the former Volnovakha corrective colony (№120); Molodizhne, Donetsk Oblast, Ukraine (Note: At the time occupied by Russia, nominally controlled by the Donetsk People's Republic.)
- Date: 29 July 2022
- Attack type: False flag prisoner massacre; Russian war crime in the Russo-Ukrainian War
- Weapon: Thermobaric artillery
- Deaths: 53–62+
- Injuries: 75–130+
- Perpetrator: Russian Armed Forces

On 29 July 2022, Russian Armed Forces shelled a building housing Ukrainian prisoners of war in a Russian-operated prison in Molodizhne near Olenivka, Donetsk Oblast, as a false flag operation during the Russian invasion of Ukraine, killing 53 to 62 Ukrainian prisoners of war (POWs) and leaving 75 to 130 wounded. The prisoners were mainly soldiers belonging to the Azov regiment who had defended the Azovstal complex, the last Ukrainian stronghold in the siege of Mariupol.

The General Staff of the Ukrainian Armed Forces said that the Russians blew up the barracks in order to cover up the torture and murder of Ukrainian POWs that had been taking place there, and Ukrainian authorities provided what they said were satellite images of pre-dug graves and intercepted communications indicating Russian culpability, while Russians suggested that a HIMARS rocket was shot from Ukrainian territory. Independent investigations based on the work of forensic and weapons experts, as well as satellite images, found that the Russian version of events is very likely fabrication and disinformation, as there is virtually no chance that the damage was caused by a HIMARS rocket and instead evidence suggests the prison was blown up by a bomb detonated within the building.

On 3 August 2022, the UN Secretary-General Antonio Guterres announced his decision to establish a fact-finding mission, as requested both by Russia and Ukraine. However, Russia refused to cooperate with the UN and International Red Cross, and the fact-finding mission was disbanded. In July 2024, the Associated Press (AP) interviewed over a dozen people with direct knowledge about the attack, all of them describing the evidence pointing towards Russia being responsible. AP also obtained an internal UN analysis that pointed to Russia as the culprit.

== Explosion ==
According to witness statements, the Russian administration of the camp in July 2022 started converting one of the large workshop buildings to a barrack, which involved bringing dozens of bunk beds and mattresses. The beds were placed without any spacing between them and so densely that movement between them was impossible, access to the block of beds was only from the sides. On 28 July over 200 Ukrainian prisoners were brought to the barrack. On the evening of 29 July around 23:00 a "Grad" MLRS launcher started firing in the vicinity of the camp. Shortly after two explosions were heard from the new barrack, leaving a large number of prisoners killed or wounded. Many wounded prisoners died because they were unable to evacuate due to the dense placement of beds. Following the explosion, the prison commander prevented ambulances from entering the colony and banned Ukrainian medic-prisoners from helping the injured.

On the night of 29 July 2022, a single barracks in a prison in Molodizhne was damaged by an explosion, killing and wounding a number of prisoners kept inside. The prison is near Olenivka, a settlement southwest of Donetsk controlled by the Russian-controlled Donetsk People's Republic (DPR). Russian casualty tallies suggest 53 Ukrainian POWs died, and another 75 were wounded (a Russian communiqué initially suggested 40 dead and 75 wounded, in addition to 8 guards). The Ukrainian side suggested that about 40 people were dead and 130 were wounded. Ultimately, 53 were confirmed dead, 9 of which survived the initial attack but died due to lack of medical assistance.

Many captive Azov fighters were in the destroyed barracks, brought there a few days earlier. Denis Pushilin, the leader of DPR, suggested that among the 193 inmates at the detention facility, there were no foreigners, but did not specify the number of Ukrainians held captive. Russian officials released a list of deceased POWs, Ukrainian officials said they were unable to verify the list.

On the day the prisoners were killed, the Russian embassy in London tweeted that the Azov Regiment fighters "deserve execution, but death not by firing squad but by hanging, because they're not real soldiers. They deserve a humiliating death". Four days after the explosion, the Russian supreme court declared the Azov Regiment a terrorist organization, and in response Ukrainian intelligence said that this was intended to justify the Olenivka prison massacre and other atrocities against Ukrainian POWs.

== Investigations ==
=== By journalists ===
Russian authorities stated that the Ukrainian forces attacked the prison with Ukrainian prisoners of war using HIMARS rocket systems. As the Russian side released videos and photos from inside the barracks, a CNN analysis noted that the Russian version of events is very likely a fabrication as there is virtually no chance that the damage was caused by a HIMARS rocket. According to the analysis the most likely cause of the explosion was an incendiary device detonated from inside the prison warehouse. The Institute for the Study of War said that available visual evidence supports the Ukrainian version of the events as the character of explosions was not consistent with a HIMARS strike, but that it could not say with certainty which side is responsible.

InformNapalm, a Ukrainian volunteer initiative, assigned the blame to the Russians by suggesting that they used a thermobaric RPO-A Shmel rocket or an MRO-A rocket and waited for the captives to burn alive.

In July 2024, the Associated Press interviewed over a dozen people with direct knowledge of details concerning the attack, including investigators, survivors and families of the dead and missing. All described evidence they believe points to Russia being responsible. An obtained internal United Nations analysis also pointed to Russia as the culprit.

In January 2025 Ukrainian journalist group ZMINA published a detailed reconstruction of the events based on witness statements and video evidence published by Russian TV, and a detailed list of Russian military and prison personnel who participated in the massacre.

=== By Ukrainian authorities ===
Prosecutor General of Ukraine Andrii Kostin stated that "according to preliminary data from international experts, prisoners in the occupied Olenivka penal colony were killed with thermobaric weapons”.

The Security Service of Ukraine (SBU) released recordings of taped telephone conversations between Russian soldiers, which suggested that the Russians had planted an explosive inside the building. The SBU added that from available video evidence, some windows were left intact and that no eyewitness accounts mention any shelling or sounds that would have normally accompanied it, which also suggests that no rocket had struck the detention facility. According to Ukraine's Ministry of Defense Intelligence Directorate, the explosion was carried out by the Wagner Group, a Russian government-backed private military company accused of war crimes in Africa, Syria, and Ukraine.

=== By UN and International Criminal Court ===
Ukraine's Foreign Ministry appealed to the International Criminal Court regarding the attack, which it called a Russian war crime, and Russia said it was starting its own investigation. Russian and Ukrainian officials also called for the International Red Cross and the United Nations to intervene. Late in the evening of 30 July Russia declared it will allow the representatives of these organisations on the site. However, ICRC (International Committee of the Red Cross) declared it did not receive invitation, nor a response to their own request to visit the site. By October 2022 no international observers or humanitarian organizations were allowed into Olenivka or granted access to the survivors, and Russian side has never published a detailed list of killed and wounded, or notified their relatives, or ICRC who has officially registered them as prisoners of war during their surrender in Mariupol.

On 3 August 2022, UN secretary-general Antonio Guterres announced his decision to established a fact-finding mission, as requested both by Russia and Ukraine. Guterres disbanded the fact-finding mission into the attack on 3 January 2023 (according to a UN spokesman) "as the UN mission cannot deploy to the site."

In March 2023, the Office of the United Nations High Commissioner for Human Rights's report on the treatment of POWs during the Russo-Ukrainian War claimed to have uncovered new details surrounding the massacre, which suggest Russian culpability. These involve the moving of prison guards away from the barracks, the digging of a fortified trench for the guards, the wearing of bullet-proof vests and helmets by the guards, and the firing of a newly deployed BM-21 Grad rocket system to cover the sounds of the explosions.

On 25 July 2023, the UN officially rejected Russia's claims that the explosion was caused by a Ukrainian HIMARS rocket.

On 4 October 2023, UN report on the case indicates that the explosion would not be compatible with that of a HIMARS and that "the pattern of structural damage appeared consistent with a projected ordnance having travelled with an east-to-west". The report also accused Russia of keeping prisoners in colony too close to the front line, exposing them to the risk of being hit.

== Reactions ==
In a statement issued on 29 July 2022, Josep Borrell, the top foreign relations official of the European Union, blamed Russia for the attack and called it a "horrific atrocity" and a "barbaric act". Officials in Estonia, the United Kingdom and France expressed a similar attitude.

The White House on 2 August 2022 mentioned that new intelligence information hints that Russia is working to fabricate evidence concerning the massacre.

== Further events ==
On 11 October 2022, the bodies of 62 soldiers, including prisoners of war killed in Olenivka, were returned to Ukraine.

On 9 December 2024, the former head of the Olenivka prison, Sergei Yevsyukov, was reportedly killed by an explosive planted under his car in Russian-occupied Donetsk, Eastern Ukraine.

On 30 August 2026, the Kyiv Post reported that Dmytro Neielov, first deputy head of Olenivka, was in unknown condition after his car was blown up in occupied Donetsk.
