= Nova Marivka =

Nova Marivka Нова Мар'ївка
- Village
- Location of Nova Marivka within Ukraine Nova Marivka (Ukraine)
- Coordinates: 47.448889°N 37.940278°E
- Country: Ukraine
- Oblast: Donetsk Oblast
- Raion: Kalmiuske Raion
- Hromada: Boikivske settlement hromada
- Founded: 1877
- Elevation: 127 m (417 ft)

Population (2001 census)
  - Total: 175
- Time zone: UTC+2 (EET)
  - Summer (DST): UTC+3 (EEST)
- Postal code: 87100
- Area code: +380 6279

Nova Marivka (Ukrainian: Нова Мар'ївка) is a village in Kalmiuske Raion (district) in Donetsk Oblast of eastern Ukraine, at 85.9 km SSE from the centre of Donetsk city.

== History ==
The settlement was taken under control of pro-Russian forces during the war in Donbas, that started in 2014.

== Demographics ==
The settlement had 175 inhabitants in 2001; native language distribution as of the 2001 Ukrainian census:

- Ukrainian: 36.57%
- Russian: 57.71%
- Greek (including Mariupol Greek and Urum): 4.57%
- German: 0.57%
