= Starohnativka =

Starohnativka Старогнатівка
- Village
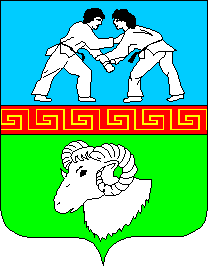
- Coat of arms

- Location of Starohnativka within Ukraine Starohnativka (Ukraine)
- Coordinates: 47°32′28″N 37°46′48″E
- Country: Ukraine
- Oblast: Donetsk Oblast
- Raion: Volnovakha Raion
- Hromada: Myrne settlement hromada
- Founded: 1782

Area
  - Total: 8.4 km^{2} (3.2 sq mi)
- Elevation: 99 m (325 ft)

Population (2001 census)
  - Total: 2,031
  - Density: 240/km^{2} (630/sq mi)
- Time zone: UTC+2 (EET)
  - Summer (DST): UTC+3 (EEST)
- Postal code: 87110
- Area code: +380 6279

Starohnativka (Ukrainian: Старогнатівка; Urum: Ґӱрджи; Russian: Старогнатовка) is a village in Volnovakha Raion (district) in Donetsk Oblast of eastern Ukraine, 65.9 km south from the centre of Donetsk city.

== History ==
Starohnativka was founded in 1782 by Georgians and Vlachs from Crimea. In the Soviet Union, it was assigned to Telmanove Raion, Donetsk Oblast in the Ukrainian SSR.

=== War in Donbass ===
In 2014, after the beginning of the war in Donbas, Russia-backed militants took over most of Telmanove Raion, leaving Starohnativka and a few other settlements in a strip of government-controlled land west of the Kalmius river, isolated from the rest of the raion. To facilitate administration, the Ukrainian government transferred that piece of land, including Starohnativka, to Volnovakha Raion in December 2014. On 10 August 2015, Ukraine accused the pro-Russian Donetsk People's Republic (DPR) rebel group of carrying out a sustained attack on Starohnativka and violating the ceasefire with the heaviest shelling in six months. The DPR denied that any such attack had taken place.

== Demographics ==
Native language as of the 2001 Ukrainian census:

- Ukrainian 89.48%
- Russian 6.29%
- Greek (including Mariupol Greek and Urum) 0.05%
