= Kalmiuske =

City in Donetsk Oblast, Ukraine

Kalmiuske (Komsomolske) Ukrainian: Кальміуське Russian: Кальмиусское (Комсомольское)
- City
- Kalmiuske
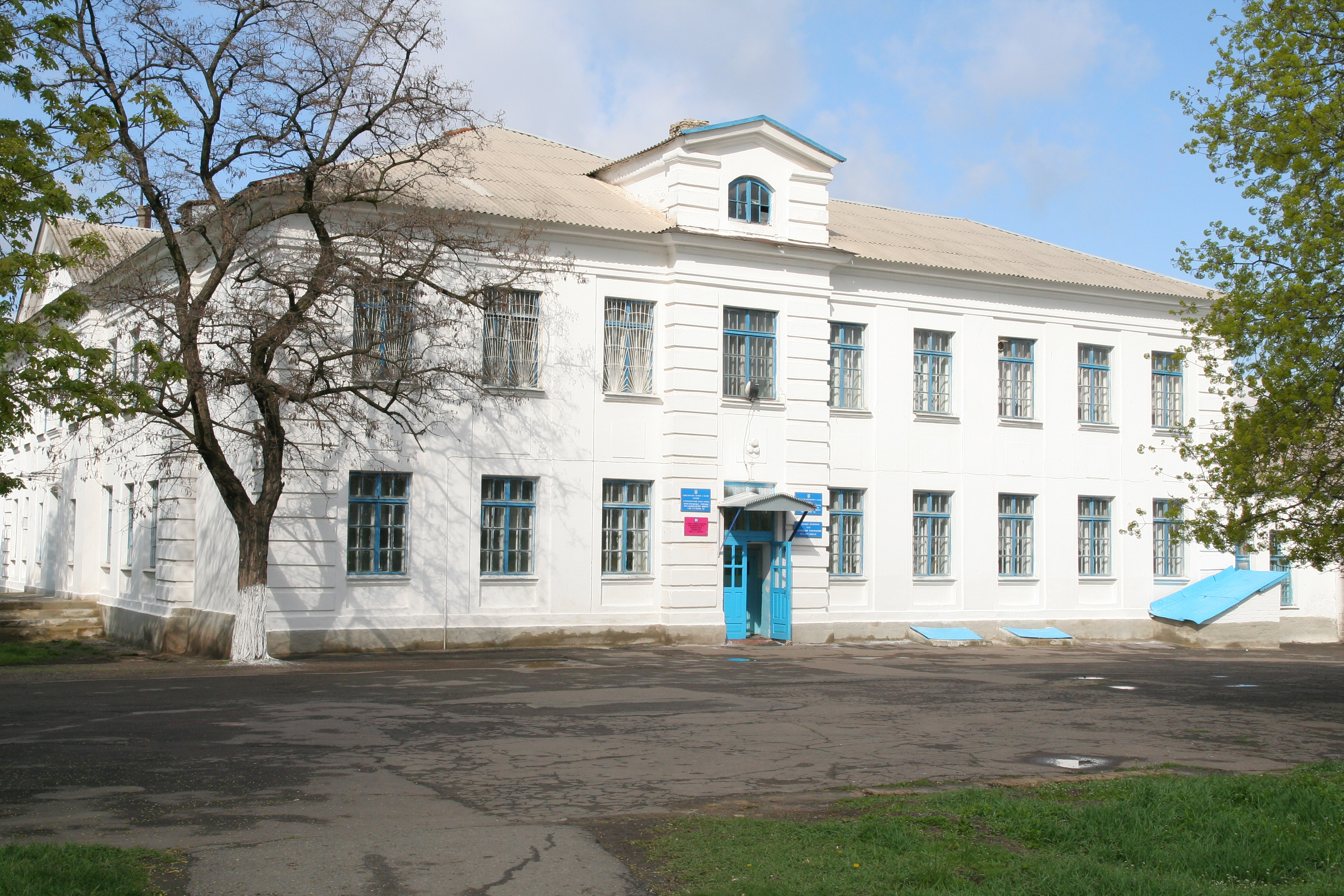
- School #5 in Kalmiuske

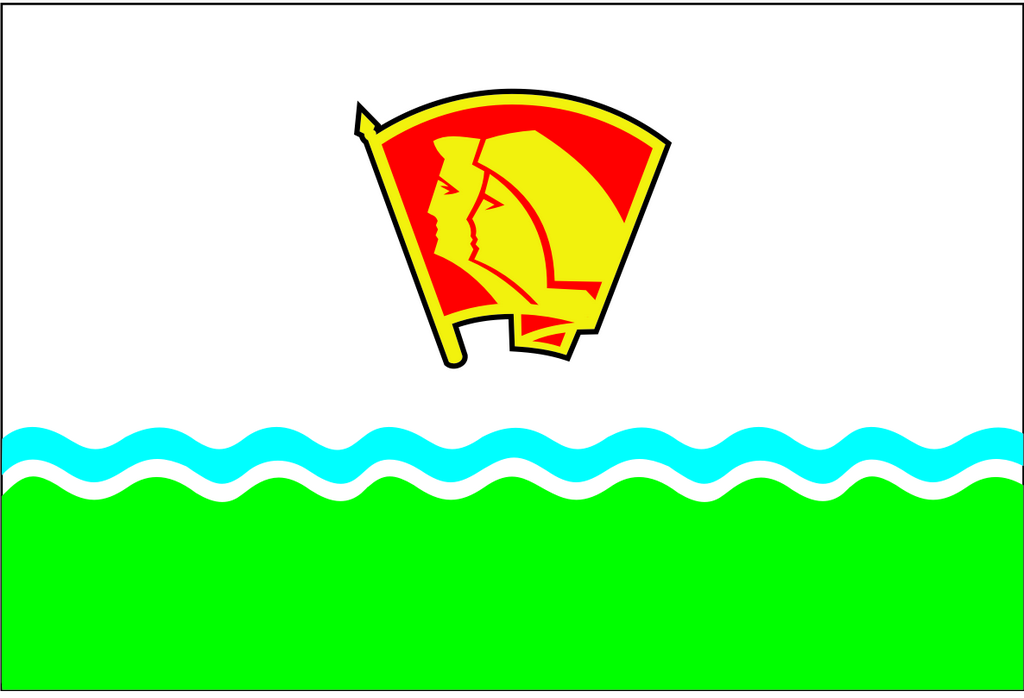
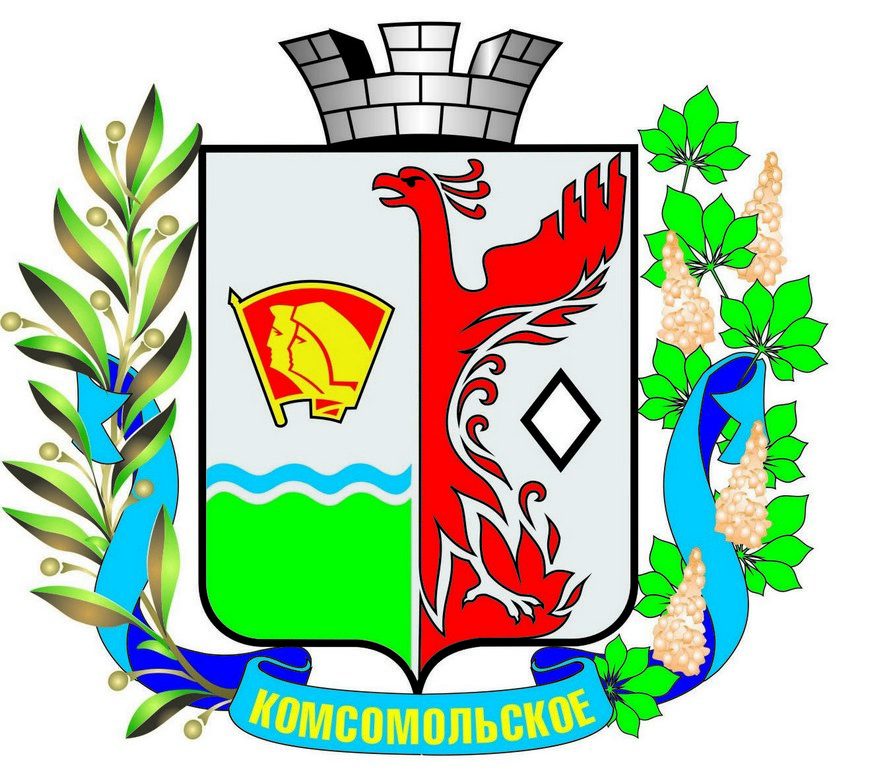
- Flag Seal
- Interactive map of Kalmiuske (Komsomolske)
- Location within Donetsk Oblast Location within Ukraine
- Coordinates: 47°40′N 38°04′E
- Country: Ukraine
- Oblast: Donetsk Oblast
- Raion: Kalmiuske Raion
- Hromada: Kalmiuske urban hromada
- Founded: 1933
- City status: 1956

Area
  - Total: 119 km^{2} (46 sq mi)
- Elevation: 72 m (236 ft)

Population (2022)
  - Total: 11,422

Kalmiuske (Note: Ukrainian: Кальміуське; Russian: Кальмиусское) or Komsomolske (Note: Ukrainian: Комсомольське; Russian: Комсомольское) is a city in Kalmiuske Raion, Donetsk Oblast, Ukraine. It is a limestone mining city, located on the Kalmius river of eastern Ukraine. It has a population of 11,422 (2022 estimate).

== Geography ==
Kalmiuske is located on the Kalmius river that flows into the Azov Sea. It is 42 kilometres (26 mi) southwest of Donetsk, the center of Donetsk Oblast.

== History ==
=== 19th and 20th century ===
Limestone deposits were first discovered in the Kalmius River Valley near the village Karakuba (now Rozdolne, Kalmiuske Raion, Donetsk Oblast) in 1833. Further research was conducted by other geologists that was eventually published in 1909 that showed significant deposits of a type of limestone required for metallurgy. However, actual development of the area did not begin until after the establishment of the Soviet Union on much of the former territory of the Russian Empire. In 1930, Soviet scientists organized an extensive survey of the "Karakuba" limestone area. The construction of the actual mines that would extract the limestone began three years later in 1933.

Kalmiuske was founded in 1933 as the village of Karakubbud (Note: Ukrainian: Каракуббуд; Russian: Каракубстрой, romanized: Karakubstroy) in connection with the construction of limestone mines nearby. It was located in Starobesheve Raion, then one of the raions in Donetsk Oblast of the Ukrainian Soviet Socialist Republic. In 1933–34, the first hundred thousand tons of limestone were obtained. By 1939, Karakubbud had a population of around 5,500 people. During World War II, Karakubbud was occupied by Nazi Germany from October 1941 to September 1943. The Nazis operated a prisoner of war camp near the outskirts of the village Chkalovske (which has since been absorbed into Kalmiuske as a district) where they killed about 6,600 people. After the end of the war, a monument was erected at the site of the prison in memory to the victims.

Karakubbud was renamed Komsomolske in 1949, and was granted city status in 1956. In 1971, the population was 15,800 people, flux limestone was mined here. Also, food industry enterprises and an industrial technical school were here.

By the time of the 1989 Soviet census, the population of the city was around 14,100 people. The basis of the economy continued to be limestone mining. In 1997, the vocational school No. 68 located in the city was merged with vocational school No. 79.

=== 21st century ===
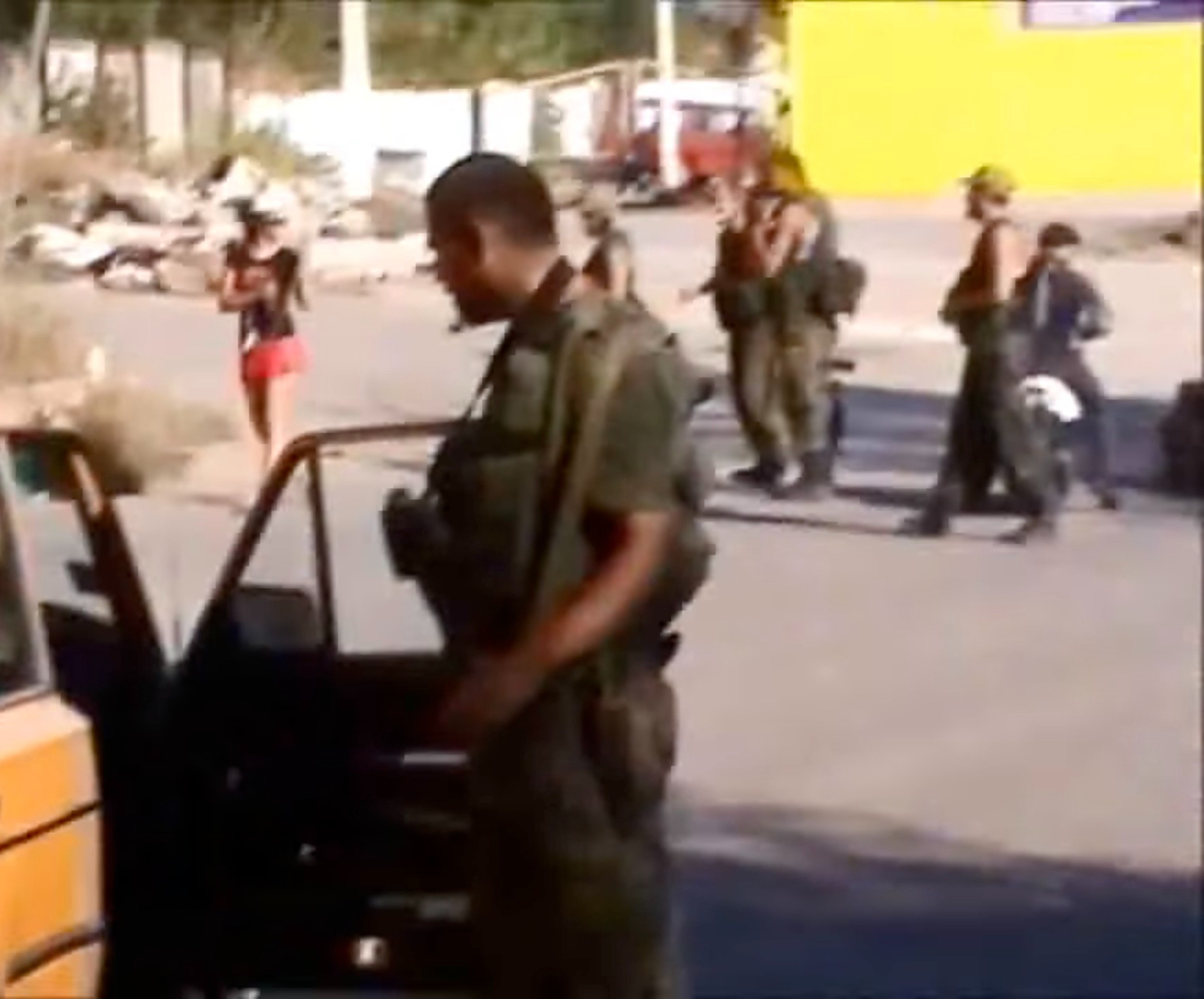
Donetsk People's Republic militants in Komsomolske, September 2014

Starting in mid-April 2014, pro-Russian separatists captured several towns in Donetsk Oblast, including Komsomolske. On 29 August 2014, Ukrainian forces reportedly secured the city from the separatists. However, after the separatist victory at the battle of Ilovaisk, the separatists loyal to the self-proclaimed Donetsk People's Republic (DPR), accompanied by the Russian military, entered Komsomolske. On 31 August, Komsomolske was confirmed to have been fully recaptured by the separatists. Reportedly, Arsen "Motorola" Pavlov personally hung up the flag of the Donetsk People's Republic all over the city, and Komsomolske became essentially a closed city. The Kharkiv Human Rights Group reported that the DPR authorities abused the "terrified" population, and arrested and tortured numerous people in the city for having pro-Ukrainian views.

During the Minsk agreements of 2014–2015 that theoretically aimed to de-escalate the war, Komsomolske was designated as part of a zone in which "deployment of heavy armaments and military equipment" was banned.

In May 2016, the Verkhovna Rada renamed the city from Komsomolske to Kalmiuske in accordance with decommunization laws. However, since the city has not been under control of the Ukrainian government, the residents remaining in the city were mostly unaware of the name change as of September that same year. Radio Svoboda, interviewing ten residents of the city in September, reported that only one had heard about the renaming law. Some legal documents still used "Komsomolske" at the time, though the newspaper predicted that after a few years, this would be rectified.

In mid-2017, there were a number of spurious arrests of people in the city by the separatists, intensifying the atmosphere of fear. Dozens have been convicted of "collaborating with the SBU" and sentenced to many years in the Izolyatsia prison as well as jails in Makiivka. In late 2017, the separatists repeatedly violated the terms of the Minsk agreements banning the deployment of heavy equipment in Kalmiuske. On 8 September 2017, the OSCE mission in Ukraine reported "eight military-type armoured vehicles and almost 60 military-type trucks" had been deployed by rebels in the city, and 10 October 2017, they reported the rebels had deployed four surface-to-air missile systems in Kalmiuske.

In June 2020, as part of the nationwide reform of administrative divisions of Ukraine, Kalmiuske was designated the administrative center of Kalmiuske urban hromada, a hromada of Ukraine that also contained several other villages and rural settlements. In July the same year, Starobesheve Raion was abolished, and Kalmiuske was transferred to and made the administrative center of the newly created Kalmiuske Raion.

== Demographics ==
Population history

| Year | Pop. | ±% |
|---|---|---|
| 1939 | 5,500 | — |
| 1959 | 15,400 | +180.0% |
| 1979 | 14,700 | −4.5% |
| 1989 | 14,100 | −4.1% |

| Year | Pop. | ±% |
|---|---|---|
| 2001 | 12,813 | −9.1% |
| 2013 | 11,763 | −8.2% |
| 2022 | 11,422 | −2.9% |

In 2001, the city had a population of 12,813 people, most of whom were ethnic Ukrainians.

Ethnic groups in Kalmiuske
| Ethnic groups | percent |
| Ukrainians | 57.24% |
| Russians | 35.92% |
| Greeks | 4.47% |
| Belarusians | 0.61% |
| Azerbaijanis | 0.37% |
| Armenians | 0.21% |
| Georgians | 0.17% |
| Tatars | 0.17% |
| Moldovans | 0.09% |

== Economy ==
=== Industry ===
The local industry is centered around the production of flux limestone.

=== Transport ===
Kalmiuske has a railway station.

== Notable people ==
- Volodymyr Bayenko (born 1990), Ukrainian football player
