= Starolaspa =

Starolaspa Староласпа
- Village
- Interactive map of Starolaspa
- Location of Starolaspa within Ukraine
- Coordinates: 47°33′41″N 37°58′37″E
- Country: Ukraine
- Oblast: Donetsk Oblast
- Raion: Kalmiuske Raion
- Hromada: Boikivske settlement hromada
- Founded: 1778
- Elevation: 97 m (318 ft)

Population (2001 census)
  - Total: 857
- Time zone: UTC+2 (EET)
  - Summer (DST): UTC+3 (EEST)
- Postal code: 87111
- Area code: +380 6279

Starolaspa (Ukrainian: Староласпа; Russian: Староласпа; Urum: Эст’и Ласпи) is a village in Kalmiuske Raion (district) in Donetsk Oblast of eastern Ukraine, at 67.7 km SSE from the centre of Donetsk city, on the right bank of the Kalmius river.

During the war in Donbas, that started in 2014, the village was taken under control of pro-Russian forces.

== Demographics ==
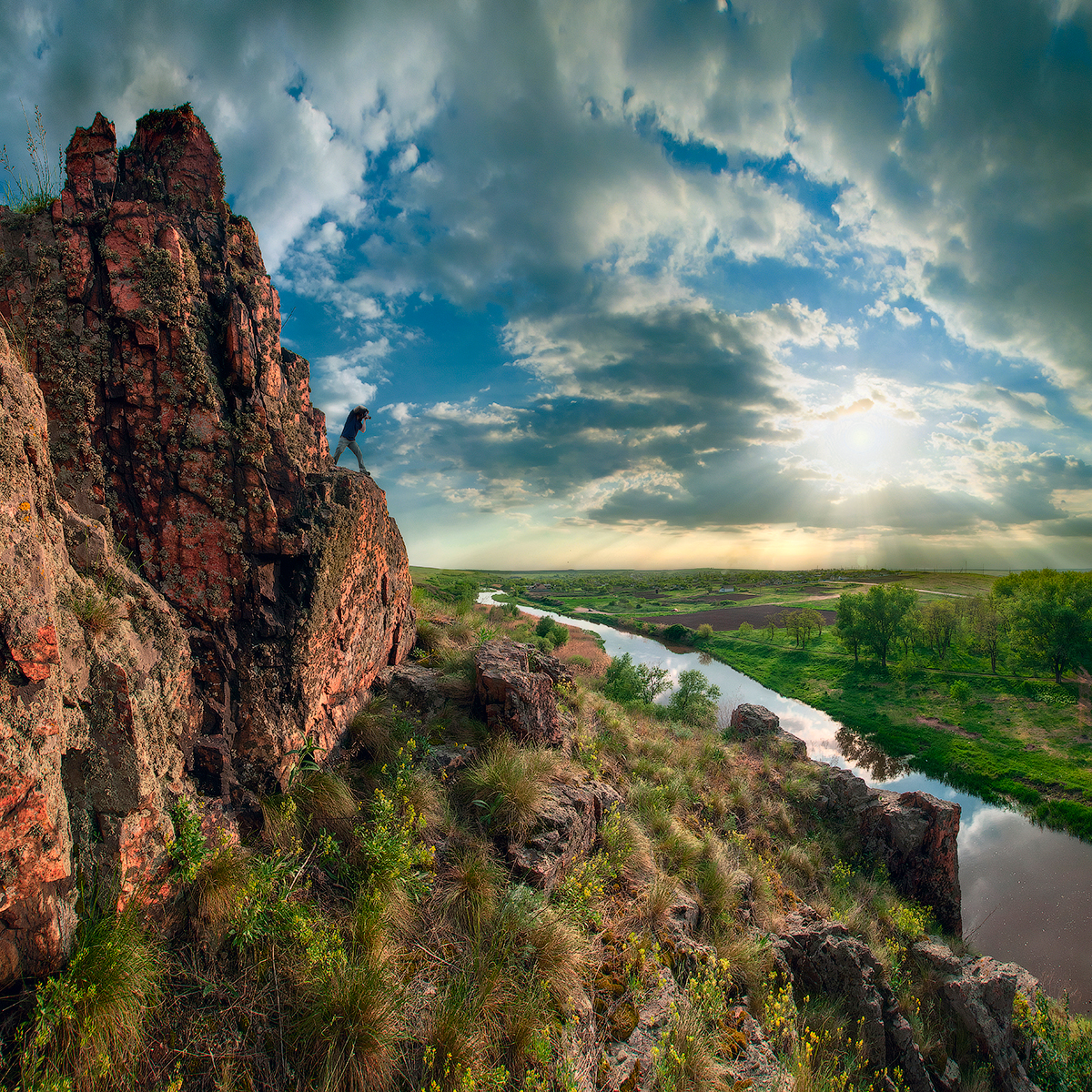
Sunset over Laspa

Native language as of the Ukrainian Census of 2001:

- Ukrainian: 9.31%
- Russian: 89.29%
- Greek (including Mariupol Greek and Urum): 0.58%
- Gagauz: 0.23%
- Armenian: 0.12%
