= Maiorove =

Coordinates: 47°29′56″N 37°58′18″E

Maiorove (Ukrainian: Майорове) is a village in Ukraine, located in Kalmiuske Raion, Donetsk Oblast. It has a population of 247 people. Before 2016, it was known as Krasnyi Oktiabr (Ukrainian: Красний Октябр).

== History ==
During the war in Donbas, the village, then known as Krasnyi Oktiabr, was taken over by the Donetsk People's Republic, a Russian puppet state. There were violent incidents near the village in 2018, when reports said that a 55-year old local lost his foot on 24 September due to a landmine explosion near a nearby river. The man was transported to Boikivske via an ambulance.

== Demographics ==
According to the 2001 Ukrainian census, the village had a population of 247 people, of whom 83.81% natively spoke Ukrainian and 16.19% natively spoke Russian.
