= Kalmiuske urban hromada =

Kalmiuske urban hromada Кальміуська міська громада
- Hromada
- Interactive map of Kalmiuske urban hromada
- Country: Ukraine
- Oblast: Donetsk Oblast
- Raion: Kalmiuske Raion
- Settlements: 38
- Cities: 1
- Rural settlements: 6
- Villages: 31

Kalmiuske urban hromada (Ukrainian: Кальміуська міська громада) is a hromada of Ukraine, located in Kalmiuske Raion, Donetsk Oblast. Its administrative center is the city Kalmiuske.

The hromada contains 38 settlements: 1 city (Kalmiuske), 6 rural settlements:

- Burne
- Kolosky
- Kypucha Krynytsia
- Rodnykove
- Stroitel
- Zernove

And 31 villages:

- Andriivka
- Berehove
- Berestove
- Hlynka
- Kamiane
- Kamianka
- Krasnopillia
- Kultura
- Kumachove
- Liubivka
- Luzhky
- Novokaterynivka
- Novomykhailivka
- Novozarivka
- Pobieda
- Pidhirne
- Prokhorivske
- Rebrykove
- Rozdolne
- Shevchenko, Kumachove Village Council
- Shevchenko, Novokaterynivka Village Council
- Shmidta
- Shyroke
- Sontseve
- Stakhivske
- Svitlyi Luch
- Vasylivka
- Verkhokamianka
- Vesele
- Vyshneve
- Zelene

== See also ==
- List of hromadas of Ukraine
