= Dokuchaievsk urban hromada =

Dokuchaievsk urban hromada Докучаєвська міська громада
- Hromada
- Interactive map of Dokuchaievsk urban hromada
- Country: Ukraine
- Oblast: Donetsk Oblast
- Raion: Kalmiuske Raion
- Settlements: 15
- Cities: 1
- Rural settlements: 6
- Villages: 8

Dokuchaievsk urban hromada (Ukrainian: Докучаєвська міська громада) is a hromada of Ukraine, located in Kalmiuske Raion, Donetsk Oblast. Its administrative center is the city Dokuchaievsk.

The hromada contains 15 settlements: 1 city (Dokuchaievsk), 6 rural settlements:

- Malynove
- Molodizhne
- Nova Olenivka
- Novomykolaivka
- Olenivka
- Yasne

And 8 villages:

- Andriivka
- Chervone
- Dolia
- Kreminets
- Liubivka
- Luhanske
- Slavne
- Syhnalne

== See also ==
- List of hromadas of Ukraine
