= Aleksandr Garkavets =

Ukrainian and Kazakhstani Turkologist and philologist (1947-)

- Александр Николаевич Гаркавец
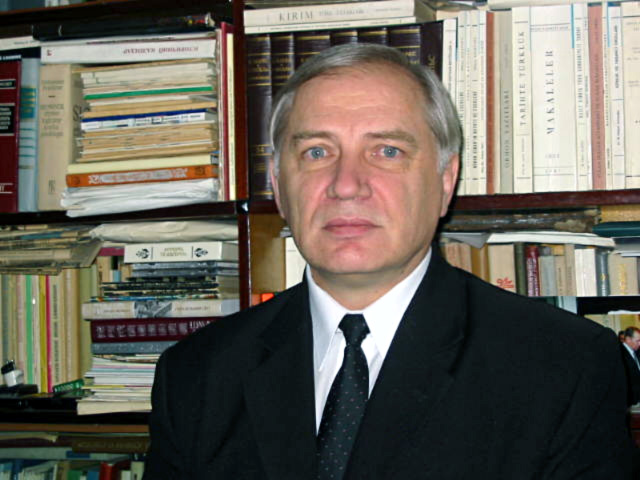
- Aleksandr Garkavets portrait
- Born: October 19, 1947 (age 78); Svitlyi Luch, Ukrainian Soviet Socialist Republic

Academic background
- Education: Institute of Linguistics of the USSR Academy of Sciences

Aleksandr Nikolaevich Garkavets (Russian: Александр Николаевич Гаркавец; Ukrainian: Олександр Миколайович Гаркавець; October 19, 1947-) is a Soviet, Ukrainian, and Kazakhstani linguist, philologist, and Turkologist. He is best known for his work on the Kipchak languages, both modern and historical. Much of the focus of his work has been on the Armeno-Kipchak language, Cuman language, Crimean Tatar language, and Urum language.

== Biography ==
Garkavets was born on October 19, 1947, in the village of Svitlyi Luch, in the Starobesheve Raion, of Donetsk Oblast in the Ukrainian Soviet Socialist Republic.

Garkavets studied at the National University of Kharkiv in the department of Ukrainian language and literature, graduating in 1970. After graduation, he worked at the newspaper Sotsialistychna Kharkivshchyna and then at the National University of Kharkiv press. He entered graduate school in 1972 at the Institute of Oriental Studies of the Russian Academy of Sciences and the Institute of Linguistics of the Russian Academy of Sciences. In 1975 he defended his PhD dissertation on Kipchak monuments written in the Armenian script in Kamianets-Podilskyi. In 1987, he received a Doctor of Philology in Turkic languages for his work on Armeno-Kipchak and Urum materials.

In 1989, the Crimean Tatars were permitted to return their homeland. In preparation for their return, Garkavets prepared a number of manuals on the Crimean Tatar language, as well as a Crimean Tatar-Russian dictionary, at the request of the Ministry of Education and Science of Ukraine.

From 1988 onward, Garkevets worked primarily in the Kazakh Soviet Socialist Republic, later Kazakhstan. From 1988 to 1992 he served as the chair of the Department of Russian Language and Sociolinguistics at the Institute of Linguistics at the Kazakhstan Academy of Sciences. In 1989 he founded the Almaty Ukrainian Cultural Center.

From 2000 onward, Garkavets has worked as the director of Center of Eurasian Studies "Desht-i Qypchaq", a Kazakhstan-based organization that promotes the study of Kipchak languages with the support of the UNESCO Almaty Cluster Office.

== Awards and honors ==
- 1988 - Award for Excellence in Education from the Ukrainian SSR
- 1989 - Makarenko Medal
- 1997 - Laureate, Kazakh Presidential Prize for Peace and Spiritual Harmony
- 2003 - Recipient of the Tarlan award
- 2006 - Award for merits in the development of science in Kazakhstan
- 2010 - Badge of honor from the Turkish Language Association
- 2017 - Recipient of a scholarship awarded by the President of Kazakhstan
- 2021 - Recipient of the "Service to the Turkish Language Award" from the Turkish Language Association

== Selected works ==
- Гаркавец, А.Н. (1979). Konvergentsiya armyano-kypchakskogo yazyka k slavyanskim v XVI-XVII vv Конвергенция армяно-кыпчакского языка к славянским в XVI-XVII вв [Convergence of the Armeno-Kipchak language with Slavic in the 16th-17th Centuries] (in Russian). Киев: Наукова Думка. OCLC 7049258.
- Гаркавец, А.Н. (1987). Kypchakskiye yazyki: kumanskiy i armyano-kypchakskiy Кыпчакские языки: куманский и армяно-кыпчакский [Kipchak languages: Cuman and Armeno-Kipchak] (in Russian). Алма-Ата: Изд-во "Наука" Казакхской ССР. OCLC 21298929.
- Гаркавец, А. Н. (1988). Tyurkskie yazyki na Ukraine (razvitie struktury) Тюркские языки на Украине (развитие структуры) [Turkic languages in Ukraine (structural development)] (in Russian). Киев: Наукова думка. ISBN 5-12-000137-8.
- Гаркавец, А.Н. Krymskotatarsko-russky slovar Крымскотатарско-русский словарь [Crimean Tatar-Russian dictionary]. Киев: Рад. школа.
- Гаркавець, Олександр (1999). Urumy Nadazovia: Istoriia, mova, kazki, pisni, zahadki, pryslivia, pisemi pamyatky Уруми Надазов’я: Iсторiя, мова, казки, пiснi, загадки, прислiв'я, писемнi пам'ятки [The Azovian Urums: History, language, folklore, songs, riddles, proverbs, written monuments] (in Ukrainian). Алма-Ата: Український культурний центр. ISBN 9789664578919.
- Гаркавець, Олександр (2000). Urumskyi slovnyk Урумський словник [Urum dictionary] (in Ukrainian). Алмати: Баур. ISBN 9785766732297.
