= Boikivske Raion =

Former subdivision of Donetsk Oblast, Ukraine

Coordinates: 47°32′N 37°46′E

Boikivske Raion Бойківський район
- Raion
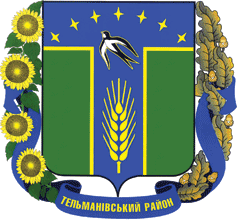
- Flag Coat of arms

- Country: Ukraine
- Region: Donetsk Oblast
- Established: 1934
- Disestablished: 18 July 2020
- Admin. center: Boikivske (de jure); Myrne (de facto, 2014–2020)
- Subdivisions: List: 0 — city councils; 3 — settlement councils; 12 — rural councils; Number of localities: 0 — cities; 3 — urban-type settlements; 53 — villages; 4 — rural settlements

Government
  - Governor: Olga Afenkina

Area
  - Total: 812.92 km^{2} (313.87 sq mi)

Population (2020)
  - Total: 13,773 ▼
  - Density: 16.943/km^{2} (43.881/sq mi)
- Time zone: UTC+02:00 (EET)
  - Summer (DST): UTC+03:00 (EEST)
- Postal index: 87100-87182
- Area code: +380 6279

Boikivske Raion (Ukrainian: Бойківський район) or Telmanove Raion (Ukrainian: Тельманівський район, romanized: Telmanivskyi raion) was one of the administrative raions (a district) of Donetsk Oblast, Ukraine from 1934 until 2020. The administrative center of the raion was located in the urban-type settlement of Boikivske, also known as Telmanove. The last estimate of the raion population, reported by the Ukrainian government, was 13,773 (2020 est.).

Since 2014, much of the area of the raion has been controlled by the Donetsk People's Republic (DPR), a Russia-supported breakaway state (later explicitly and illegally annexed by Russia).

== History ==
=== 20th century ===
The raion was originally formed as Ostheim Raion in late 1934, with Ostheim (now Boikivske) as its center. In 1935, the raion was renamed Telmanove Raion after the German Communist leader Ernst Thälmann. As the result of the 1951 Polish–Soviet territorial exchange, the Soviet authorities deported and resettled approximately 400 families of Boykos from the village of Chorna (today Czarna in Poland), the former Nyzhni Ustryky Raion of Drohobych Oblast that was transferred to Poland.

=== 21st century ===
In 2014, the pro-Russian militant group known as the Donetsk People's Republic (DPR) seized almost all of Telmanove Raion, along with other parts of Donetsk Oblast and Luhansk Oblast, beginning the war in Donbas. On 9 December 2014, the Verkhovna Rada, Ukraine's national parliament, moved the raion's administration and headquarters to Myrne, a town in Telmanove Raion which remained under government control. The boundaries of Telmanove Raion were also adjusted, changing its total area to 812.92 km^{2} (313.87 mi^{2}). This was due to the fact that a small part of the raion on the west bank of the Kalmius river was under Ukrainian army control, and had been effectively severed from the rest of the raion by the frontline of the war, severely hindering the administration of the villages in that area. To fix this problem, the Ukrainian government transferred government-controlled land to Volnovakha Raion, so that the reduced area of the raion was entirely under control of the pro-Russian militants. The transferred localities included the towns Andriivka and Myrne, among other smaller settlements.

In 2016, Ukraine's national parliament, the Verkhovna Rada, renamed Telmanove Raion to Boikivske Raion and Telmanove to Boikivske. The town's name change was done in commemoration of the Boykos people who were deported there in the 1950s.

The raion was officially abolished on 18 July 2020 as part of the administrative reform of Ukraine, which reduced the number of raions of Donetsk Oblast to eight. The area of Boikivske Raion was merged into the newly created Kalmiuske Raion. The DPR has continued using the raion - as "Telmanove Raion" - as one of its administrative units.

== Geography ==
Telmanove Raion bordered Novoazovsk Raion to its south, Nikolske Raion to its southwest, Volnovakha Raion to its west, Starobesheve Raion to its north. From the east, the raion was bounded by the international Russia–Ukraine border.

== Administrative divisions ==
The district is divided into three settlement councils and twelve rural councils.

== Demographics ==
According to the 2001 Ukrainian Census:

Ethnicity
Ukrainians	20,442	57.8%
Russians	7,359	20.8%
Greeks (Urums)	6,172	17.5%
Tatars	623	1.8%
Belarusians	165	0.5%
Germans	152	0.4%

== Gallery ==
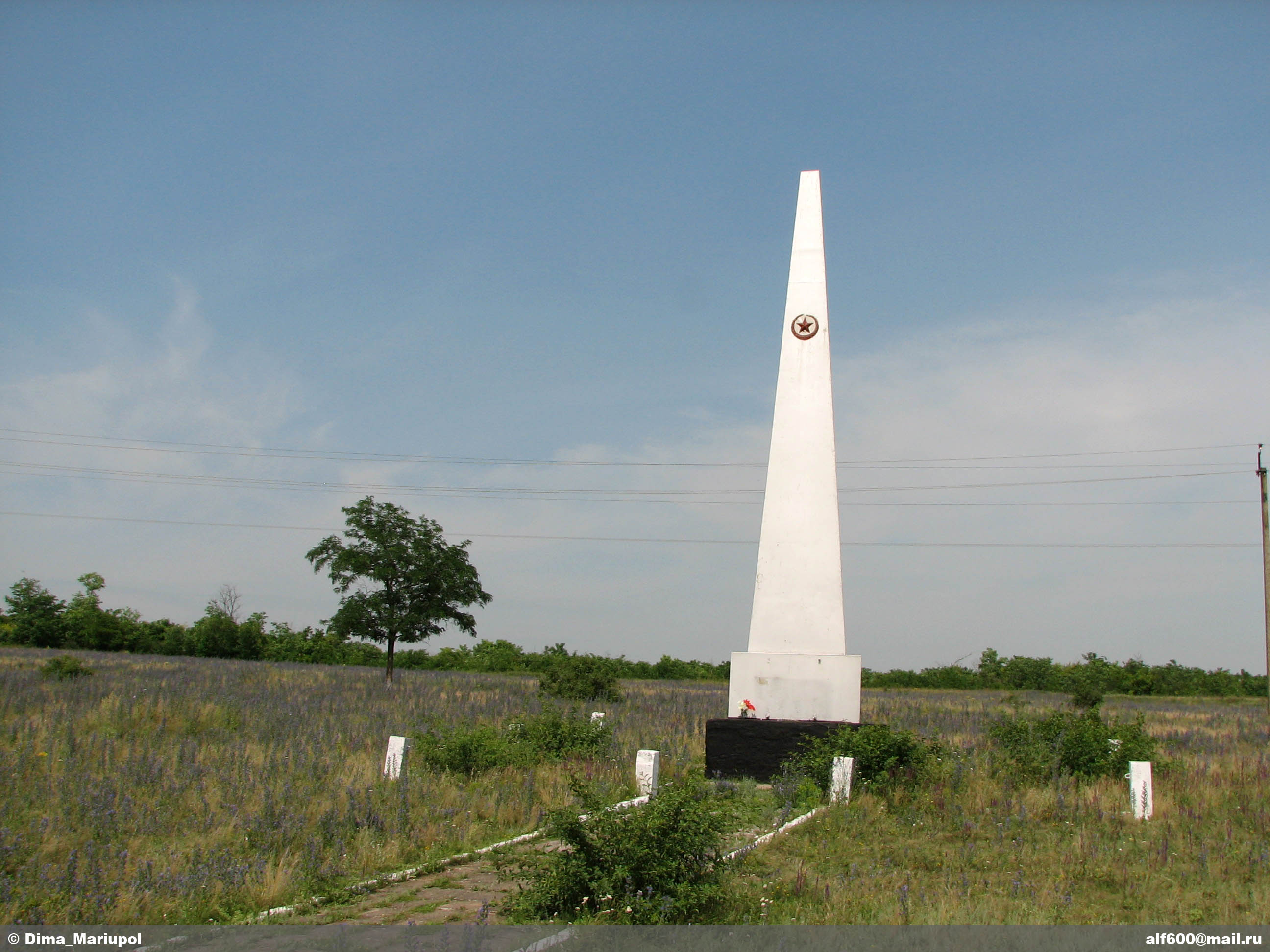
Monument in Konkove (25th Anniversary of Donbas liberation from Nazi invaders)

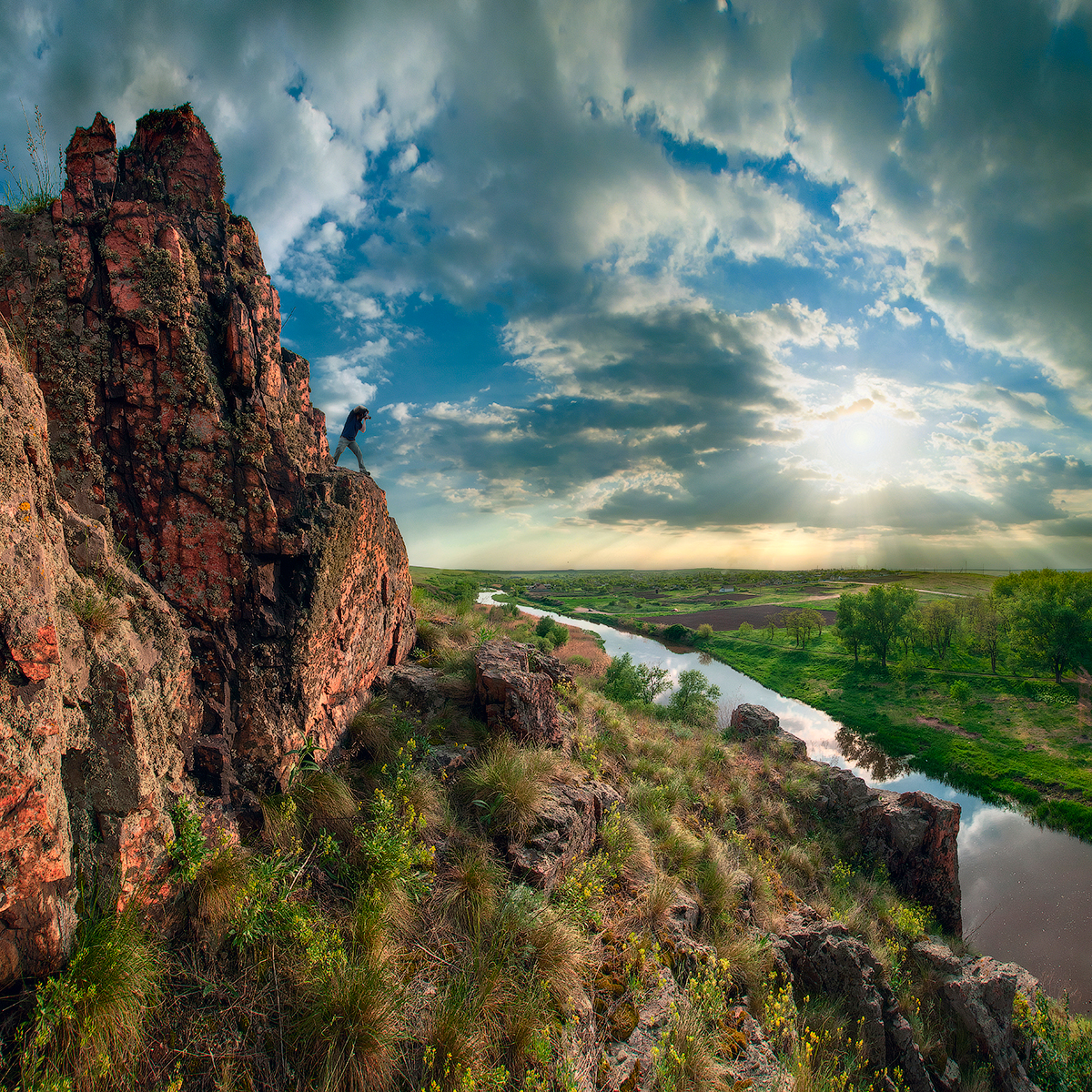
Landscape of the Kalmius Reserve

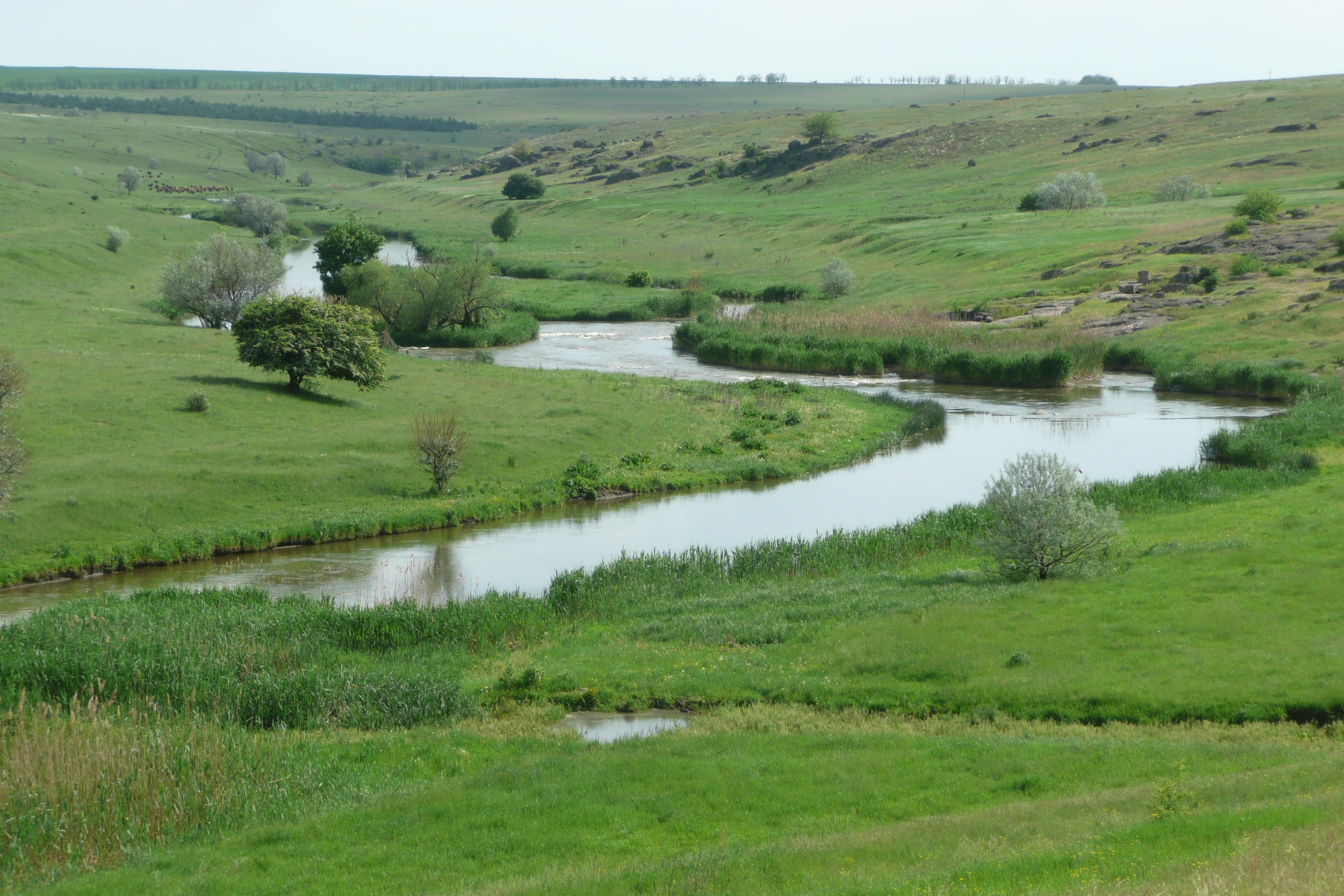
Kalmius River at the Kalmius Reserve
