= Boikivske settlement hromada =

Boikivske settlement hromada Бойківська селищна громада
- Hromada
- Interactive map of Boikivske settlement hromada
- Country: Ukraine
- Oblast: Donetsk Oblast
- Raion: Kalmiuske Raion
- Settlements: 42
- Rural settlements: 1
- Villages: 41

Boikivske settlement hromada (Ukrainian: Бойківська селищна громада) is a hromada of Ukraine, located in Kalmiuske Raion, Donetsk Oblast. Its administrative center is the rural settlement of Boikivske.

The hromada includes 42 settlements: 1 rural settlement (Boikivske) and 41 villages:

- Bila Kamianka
- Bilokrynychne
- Bohdanivka
- Cherevkivske
- Chorne
- Chumak
- Chyrylianske
- Dersove
- Hrekovo-Oleksandrivka
- Hrintal
- Hryhorivka
- Ivanivka
- Kamianuvate
- Kaplany
- Konkove
- Kotliarevske
- Kuznetsovo-Mykhailivka
- Lavrynove
- Lukove
- Maiorove
- Mykhailivka
- Mykolaivka
- Nova Marivka
- Novolaspa
- Novooleksandrivka
- Oleksandrivske
- Petrivske
- Rozivka
- Sadky
- Samsonove
- Shevchenko
- Starolaspa
- Svobodne
- Ternivka
- Tavriiske
- Vershynivka
- Volia
- Zaporozhets
- Zelenyi Hai
- Zernove
- Zori

== Demographics ==
As of the 2001 Ukrainian census, the municipality had a population of 17,503 inhabitants. The native language composition was as follows:

Native languages (2001)
	percent
Ukrainian	67.0%
Russian	32.6%
Greek	0.2%
Belarusian	0.1%
others	0.1%

== See also ==
- List of hromadas of Ukraine
