= Bila Kamianka =

Bila Kamianka Біла Камянка
- Village
- Interactive map of Bila Kamianka
- Location of Bila Kamyanka within Ukraine
- Coordinates: 47°32′27″N 37°51′47″E
- Country: Ukraine
- Oblast: Donetsk Oblast
- Raion: Kalmiuske Raion
- Hromada: Boikivske settlement hromada
- Founded: 1963
- Elevation: 120 m (390 ft)

Population (2001 census)
  - Total: 83
- Time zone: UTC+2 (EET)
  - Summer (DST): UTC+3 (EEST)
- Postal code: 87112
- Area code: +380 6279

Bila Kamianka (Ukrainian: Біла Кам'янка; Russian: Белая Каменка; Urum: Ахташ) is a village in Kalmiuske Raion (district) in Donetsk Oblast of eastern Ukraine, at 73.2 kilometres (45.5 mi) south from the centre of Donetsk city.

== Demographics ==
Russian was the native language of the village's entire population as of the 2001 Ukrainian census.
