= Sarabash =

Village in Donetsk Oblast, Ukraine

Sarabash Сарабаш
- Village
- Interactive map of Sarabash
- Location of Sarabash within Ukraine Sarabash (Ukraine)
- Coordinates: 47.760556°N 37.789722°E
- Country: Ukraine
- Oblast: Donetsk Oblast
- Raion: Kalmiuske Raion
- Hromada: Starobesheve settlement hromada
- Elevation: 141 m (463 ft)

Population (2001 census)
  - Total: 1,008
- Time zone: UTC+2 (EET)
  - Summer (DST): UTC+3 (EEST)
- Postal code: 87220
- Area code: +380 6253

Sarabash (Ukrainian: Сарабаш; Russian: Сарабаш), until 2016 Komunarivka (Комунарівка), is a village in Kalmiuske Raion (district) in Donetsk Oblast of eastern Ukraine, located 28.68 kilometres (17.82 mi) south by west (SbW) of the centre of Donetsk city. It belongs to Starobesheve settlement hromada, one of the hromadas of Ukraine.

== Demographics ==
As of the 2001 Ukrainian census, the settlement had 1,008 inhabitants, whose native languages were 15.77% Ukrainian, 83.73% Russian and 0.10% Belarusian.
