= Novolaspa =

Novolaspa Новоласпа
- Village
- Interactive map of Novolaspa
- Location of Novolaspa within Ukraine
- Coordinates: 47°34′22″N 37°52′35″E
- Country: Ukraine
- Oblast: Donetsk Oblast
- Raion: Kalmiuske Raion
- Hromada: Boikivske settlement hromada
- Elevation: 170 m (560 ft)

Population (2001 census)
  - Total: 372
- Time zone: UTC+2 (EET)
  - Summer (DST): UTC+3 (EEST)
- Postal code: 87112
- Area code: +380 6279

Novolaspa (Ukrainian: Новоласпа; Russian: Новоласпа; Urum: Йаны Ласпи) is a village in Kalmiuske Raion (district) in Donetsk Oblast of eastern Ukraine, at 75.2 km SSE from the centre of Donetsk city.

During the war in Donbas, that started in 2014, the village was taken under control of pro-Russian forces.

== Demographics ==
Native language as of the Ukrainian Census of 2001:

- Ukrainian: 1.58%
- Russian: 98.42%
