= Zelenyi Hai, Kalmiuske Raion, Donetsk Oblast =

Zelenyi Hai Зелений Гай
- Village
- Location within Donetsk Oblast Location within Ukraine
- Coordinates: 47°25′06.0″N 38°15′32.0″E
- Country: Ukraine
- Oblast: Donetsk
- Raion: Kalmiuske Raion
- Hromada: Boikivske settlement hromada

Population (2001 census)
  - Total: 118
- Time zone: UTC+2 (EET)
  - Summer (DST): UTC+3 (EEST)

Zelenyi Hai (Ukrainian: Зелений Гай) is a village in Boikivske settlement hromada, Kalmiuske Raion, Donetsk Oblast, Ukraine.

== Demographics ==
As of the 2001 Ukrainian census, Zelenyi Hai had a population of 118 inhabitants. The linguistic composition of the population was as follows:

Native languages in Zelenyi Hai
	percent
Ukrainian	89.0%
Russian	11.0%
others	0.0%
