= Svitlyi Luch =

Svitlyi Luch Сві́тлий Луч
- Town
- Location of Svitlyi Luch Svitlyi Luch (Ukraine)
- Coordinates: 47°41′25″N 38°18′33″E
- Country: Ukraine
- Oblast: Donetsk
- Raion: Kalmiuske
- Hromada: Kalmiuske Municipal Hromada
- Elevation: 154 m (505 ft)

Population
  - Total: 41

Svitlyi Luch (Ukrainian: Сві́тлий Луч, pronounced [ˈs⁽ʲ⁾witlɪj ˈlutʃ]) is a village in Ukraine, in the Kalmiuske Raion of Donetsk Oblast. As of 2001, the population was 41.

== Demographics ==
As of the 2001 Ukrainian Census, 36.59% of the population spoke Ukrainian, 58.54% spoke Russian, and 4.88% spoke Belarusian.

== Notable residents ==
- Aleksandr Garkavets, linguist, philologist, and Turkologist
