= Styla =

Styla Стила
- Village
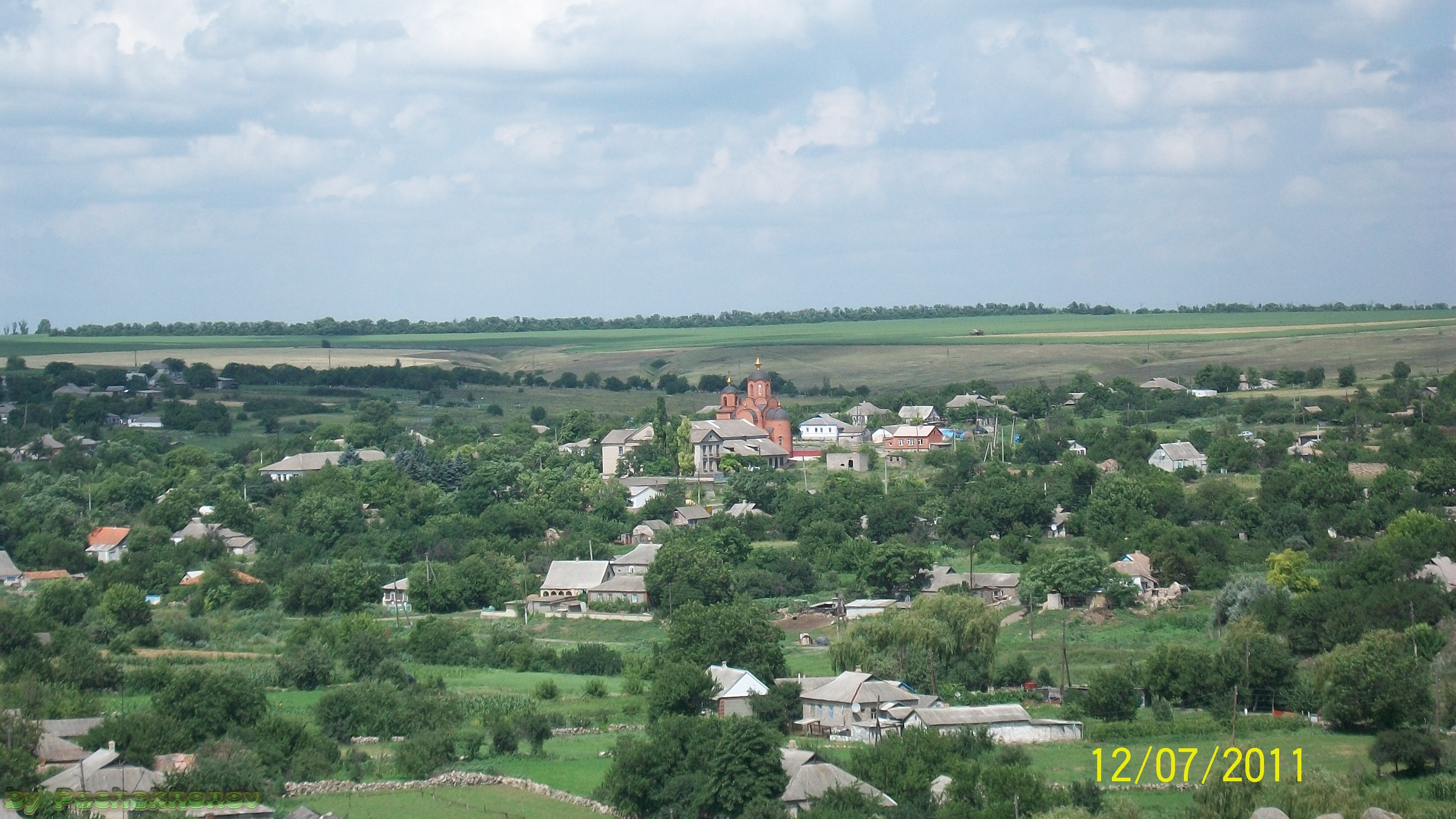
- Interactive map of Styla
- Location of Styla within Ukraine Styla (Donetsk Oblast)
- Coordinates: 47°41′37″N 37°50′15″E
- Country: Ukraine
- Oblast: Donetsk Oblast
- Raion: Kalmiuske Raion
- Hromada: Starobesheve settlement hromada
- Founded: 1780
- Elevation: 114 m (374 ft)

Population (2001 census)
  - Total: 2,198
- Time zone: UTC+2 (EET)
  - Summer (DST): UTC+3 (EEST)
- Postal code: 87221
- Area code: +380 6253

Styla (Ukrainian: Стила; Russian: Стыла; Greek: Στύλα) is a village in Kalmiuske Raion (district) in Donetsk Oblast of eastern Ukraine, at 46.9 km south from the centre of Donetsk city.

Pro-Russian forces took the village under their control during the Russo-Ukrainian War.

== Demographics ==
Native language as of the Ukrainian Census of 2001:

- Ukrainian: 3.23%
- Russian: 87.49%
- Greek (including Mariupol Greek and Urum): 8.96%
- Belarusian: 0.23%
- Moldovan (Romanian): 0.05%
