= Starobesheve settlement hromada =

Starobesheve settlement hromada Старобешівська селищна громада
- Hromada
- Interactive map of Starobesheve settlement hromada
- Country: Ukraine
- Oblast: Donetsk
- Raion: Kalmiuske
- Settlements: 22
- Rural settlements: 3
- Villages: 17
- Towns: 2

Starobesheve settlement hromada (Ukrainian: Старобешівська селищна громада) is a hromada of Ukraine, located in Kalmiuske Raion, Donetsk Oblast. Its administrative center is the town of Starobesheve.

The hromada includes 22 settlements: 2 towns (Starobesheve and Novyi Svit), 17 villages:

- Andriivka
- Voznesenka
- Horbatenko
- Kamianka
- Marianivka
- Novobesheve
- Novoselivka
- Obilne
- Oleksandrivka
- Osykove
- Petrivske
- Pishhane
- Prydorozhnye
- Sarabash
- Svitle
- Styla
- Chumaky

And 3 rural-type settlements: Verezamсke, Manzhykiv Kut, and Menchuhove.

== See also ==
- List of hromadas of Ukraine
