= Olenivka, Kalmiuske Raion, Donetsk Oblast =

Urban locality in Donetsk Oblast, Ukraine

Olenivka Оленівка
- Rural settlement
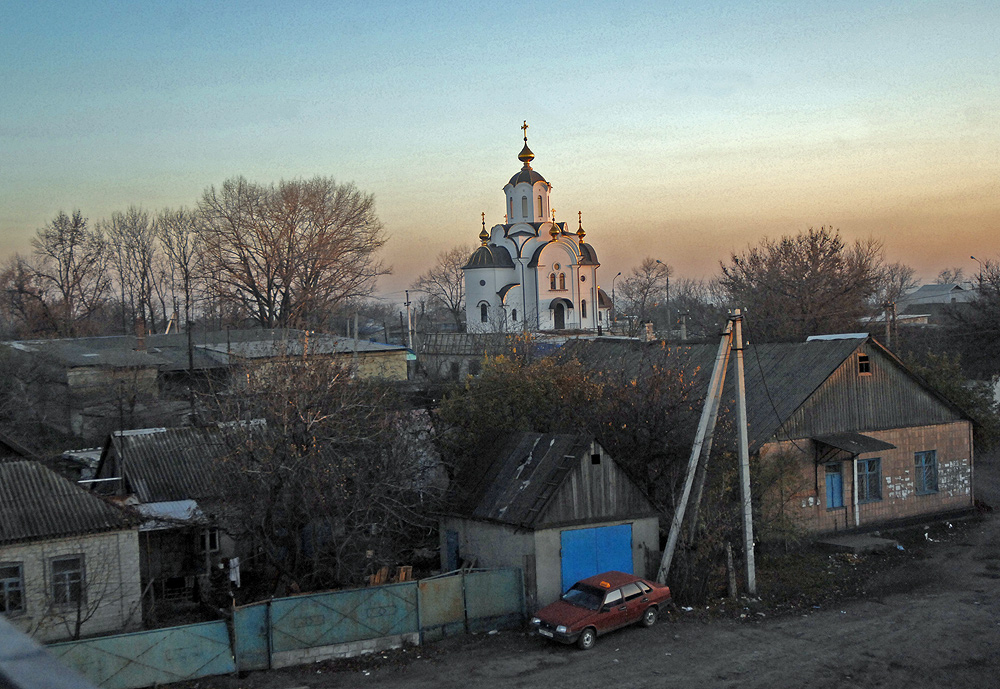
- St. Constantine & St. Helena Church
- Interactive map of Olenivka
- Location of Olenivka within Donetsk Oblast Olenivka (Ukraine)
- Coordinates: 47°49′53″N 37°39′36″E
- Country: Ukraine
- Oblast: Donetsk Oblast
- Raion: Kalmiuske Raion
- Hromada: Dokuchaievsk urban hromada
- Founded: 1840

Area
  - Total: 4.7 km^{2} (1.8 sq mi)
- Elevation: 216 m (709 ft)

Population (1 January 2022)
  - Total: 4,513
  - Density: 960/km^{2} (2,500/sq mi)
- Postal code: 85710
- Area code: +380 6279

Olenivka (Ukrainian: Оленівка; Russian: Оленовка, romanized: Olenovka) is a rural settlement in Kalmiuske Raion, Donetsk Oblast, eastern Ukraine. It is located 20.5 kilometres (12.7 mi) southwest from the center of the city of Donetsk. It had a population of 4,513 (2022 estimate).

== History ==
Beginning in April 2014, the ongoing Russo-Ukrainian war and related war in Donbas has brought both civilian and military casualties.

Since 2014, the town is controlled by the separatist Donetsk People's Republic, and it was annexed by Russia in 2022 following internationally unrecognized referendums. On 29 July 2022, the Olenivka prison massacre of Ukrainian prisoners of war took place near the settlement.

== Demographics ==
According to the 2001 Ukrainian census, the settlement had 4801 inhabitants. The population is vastly Ukrainophone.

Native languages in Olenivka
Languages	percent
Ukrainian	81.5%
Russian	17.8%
Belarusian	0.1%
others	0.6%

== See also ==
- Territorial control during the Russo-Ukrainian War
