= Novyi Svit, Donetsk Oblast =

Urban locality in Donetsk Oblast, Ukraine

Novyi Svit Новий Світ
- Rural settlement
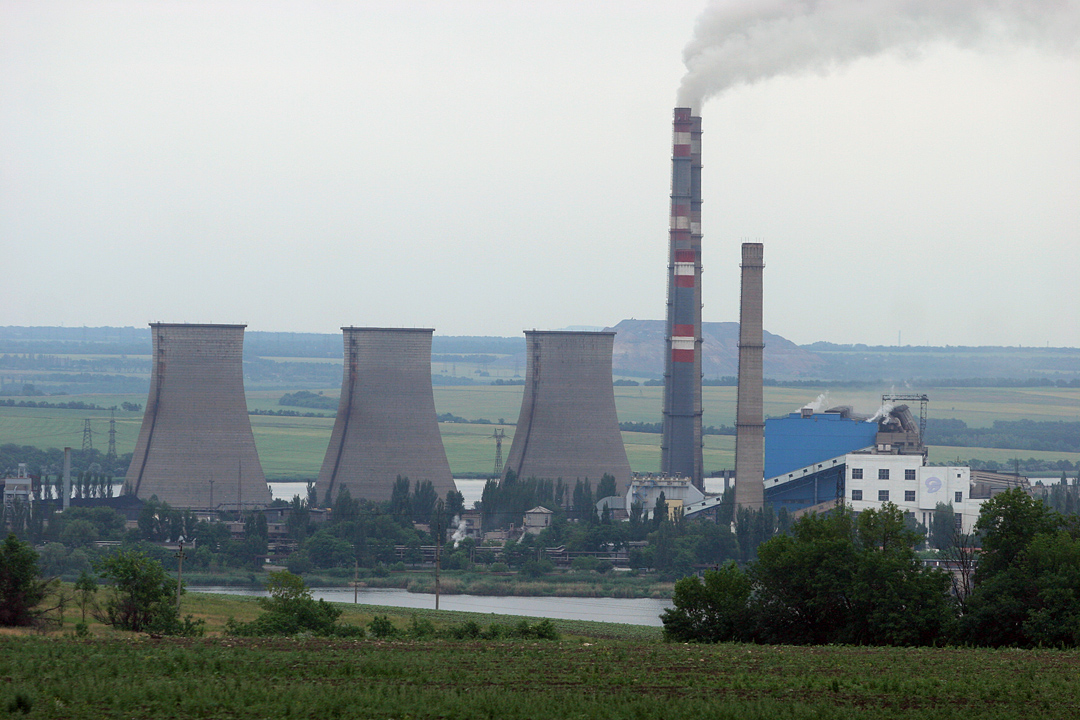
- Interactive map of Novyi Svit
- Location of Novyi Svit in Donetsk Oblast Novyi Svit (Ukraine)
- Coordinates: 47°48′21″N 38°1′7″E
- Country: Ukraine
- Oblast: Donetsk Oblast
- Raion: Kalmiuske Raion
- Hromada: Starobesheve settlement hromada
- Founded: 1954
- Elevation: 128 m (420 ft)

Population (2022)
  - Total: 8,996
- Time zone: UTC+2 (EET)
  - Summer (DST): UTC+3 (EEST)
- Postal code: 87230-87231
- Area code: +380 6253

Novyi Svit (Ukrainian: Новий Світ; Russian: Новый Свет) is a rural settlement in Kalmiuske Raion, Donetsk Oblast, eastern Ukraine. Population: 8,996 (2022 estimate).

== Demographics ==
Native language as of the Ukrainian Census of 2001:

- Ukrainian: 11.43%
- Russian: 88.31%
- Greek (including Mariupol Greek and Urum): 0.07%
- Belarusian: 0.05%
- Armenian: 0.01%
