= Myrne settlement hromada, Donetsk Oblast =

Myrne settlement hromada Мирненська селищна громада
- Hromada
- Interactive map of Myrne settlement hromada
- Country: Ukraine
- Oblast: Donetsk
- Raion: Volnovakha

Area
  - Total: 415.6 km^{2} (160.5 sq mi)

Population (2020)
  - Total: 11,845
  - Density: 28.50/km^{2} (73.82/sq mi)
- Settlements: 15
- Rural settlements: 4
- Villages: 9
- Towns: 2

Myrne settlement hromada (Ukrainian: Мирненська селищна громада) is a hromada of Ukraine, located in Volnovakha Raion, Donetsk Oblast. Its administrative center is the town of Myrne.

It has an area of 415.6 square kilometres (160.5 mi^{2}) and a population of 11,845, as of 2020.

The hromada includes 15 settlements: 2 towns (Myrne and Andriivka) and 9 villages:

- Hranitne
- Kamianka
- Novohryhorivka
- Novoselivka
- Novoselivka Druha
- Starohnativka
- Staromarivka
- Stepanivka
- Zaporizke

And 4 rural-type settlements: Bakhchovyk, Druzhne, Malovodne, and Obilne.

== See also ==
- List of hromadas of Ukraine
