= Myrne, Myrne settlement hromada, Volnovakha Raion, Donetsk Oblast =

Rural settlement in Donetsk Oblast, Ukraine

Myrne Мирне
- Rural settlement
- Location of Myrne within Donetsk Oblast#Location of Myrne within Ukraine Myrne (Ukraine)
- Coordinates: 47°25′56″N 37°43′47″E
- Country: Ukraine
- Oblast: Donetsk Oblast
- Raion: Volnovakha Raion
- Hromada: Myrne settlement hromada
- Founded: 1951

Area
  - Total: 0.87 km^{2} (0.34 sq mi)
- Elevation: 163 m (535 ft)

Population (2022)
  - Total: 1,631
  - Density: 1,900/km^{2} (4,900/sq mi)
- Time zone: UTC+2 (EET)
  - Summer (DST): UTC+3 (EEST)
- Postal code: 87124—87125
- Area code: +380 6279

Myrne (Ukrainian: Мирне; Russian: Мирное, romanized: Mirnoye) is a rural settlement in Volnovakha Raion, Donetsk Oblast, eastern Ukraine. Myrne is the administrative center of Myrne settlement hromada, one of the hromadas of Ukraine. Its population is 1,631 (2022 estimate).

== History ==
Myrne was founded in 1951 in connection with the construction of granite quarries in the local area. At the time of its founding, it was located in Telmanove Raion, Donetsk Oblast in the Ukrainian SSR. In 1967, Myrne received urban-type settlement status.

In December 2014, during the war in Donbas, separatists loyal to the Donetsk People's Republic, a pro-Russian breakaway state in eastern Ukraine, had seized control of most of Telmanove Raion. As a result of the violence, the Ukrainian government moved the administration building and government of Telmanove Raion from Telmanove to Myrne. Telmanove Raion was renamed Boikivske Raion in 2016. In June 2020, Myrne became the center of Myrne settlement hromada within Volnovakha Raion. Boikivske Raion was abolished by the Ukrainian government as an administrative unit in July 2020.

In early to mid March 2022, during the full-scale Russian invasion of Ukraine, the town was captured by Russian forces, after Ukrainian forces withdrew from the area following the Battle of Volnovakha.

== Demographics ==
As of the 2001 Ukrainian census, Myrne had a population of 2,110 people. In terms of ethnic background, 81.4% were Russians and 18.19% were Ukrainians. Native language:

- Ukrainian 18.19%
- Russian 81.4%
- Belarusian 0.05%

Population history
| Year | 1959 | 1970 | 1979 | 1989 | 2001 | 2016 | 2022 |
| Pop. | 1,365 | 2,440 | 2,391 | 2,293 | 2,110 | 1,766 | 1,631 |
| ±% | — | +78.8% | −2.0% | −4.1% | −8.0% | −16.3% | −7.6% |
