= Slavne, Kalmiuske Raion, Donetsk Oblast =

Slavne Славне
- Village
- Interactive map of Slavne
- Location of Slavne within Ukraine Slavne (Ukraine)
- Coordinates: 47.833333°N 37.565833°E
- Country: Ukraine
- Oblast: Donetsk Oblast
- Raion: Kalmiuske Raion
- Hromada: Dokuchaievsk urban hromada
- Status: 2011
- Elevation: 193 m (633 ft)

Population (2001 census)
  - Total: 237
- Time zone: UTC+2 (EET)
  - Summer (DST): UTC+3 (EEST)
- Postal code: 85662
- Area code: +380 6278

Slavne (Ukrainian: Славне; Russian: Славное) is a village in Kalmiuske Raion (district) in Donetsk Oblast of eastern Ukraine, at 27.53 kilometres (17.11 mi) southwest (SW) from the centre of Donetsk city.

In 2020, as part of the reform of administrative districts in Ukraine, Slavne was transferred from Marinka Raion to the newly created Kalmiuske Raion. Until the 2022 Russian invasion of Ukraine, Slavne was the only locality in Kalmiuske Raion under Ukrainian government control.

== Demographics ==
The settlement had 237 inhabitants in 2001; native language distribution as of the Ukrainian Census of 2001:

- Ukrainian: 45.57%
- Russian: 54.43%
