= Dokuchaievsk =

City in Donetsk Oblast, Ukraine

Dokuchaievsk Докучаєвськ
- City
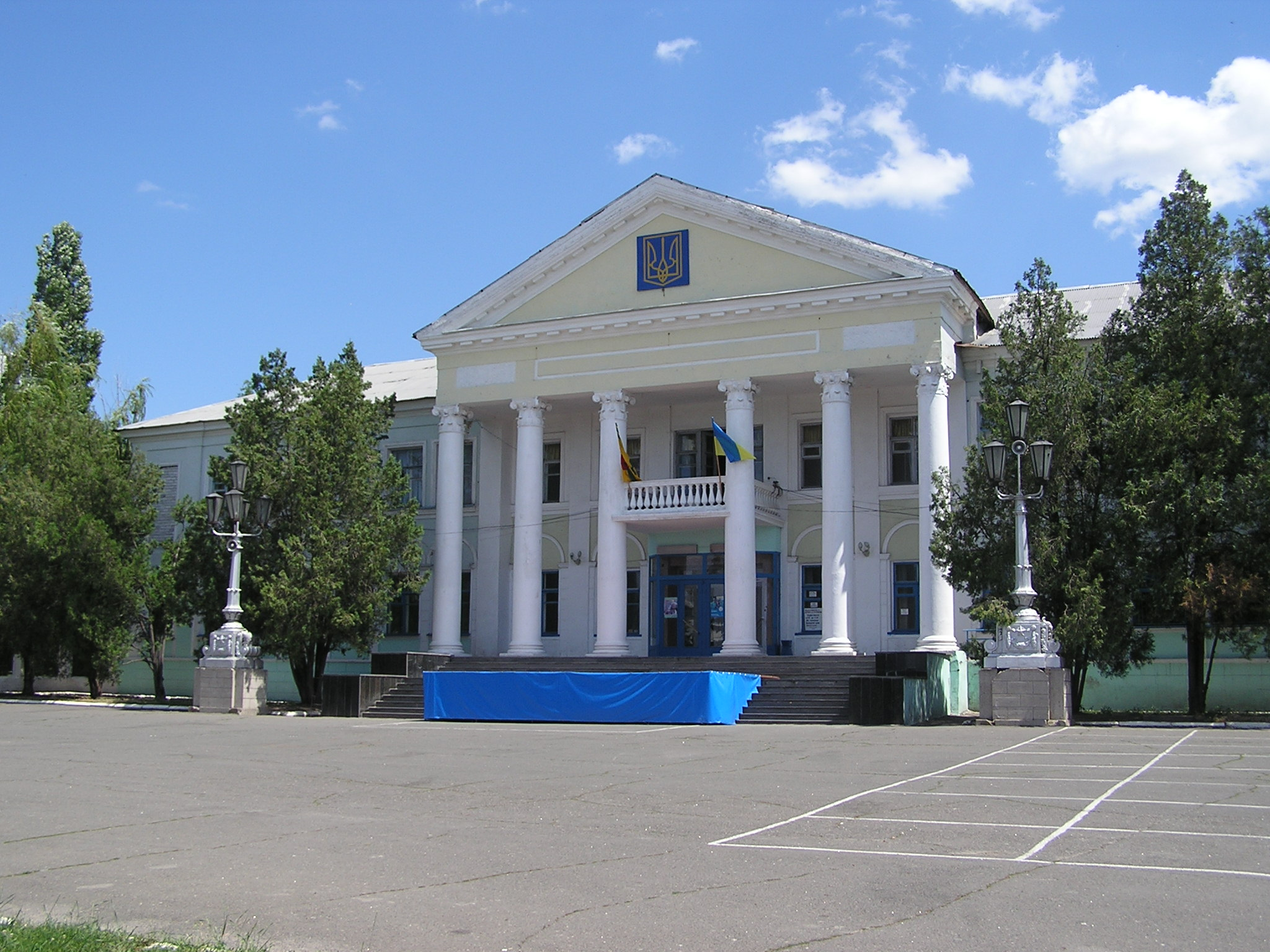
- Dokuchaievsk City hall

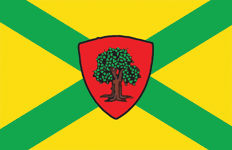
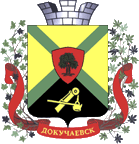
- Flag Coat of arms
- Interactive map of Dokuchaievsk
- Location within Donetsk Oblast Location within Ukraine
- Coordinates: 47°45′07″N 37°40′42″E
- Country: Ukraine
- Oblast: Donetsk Oblast
- Raion: Kalmiuske Raion
- Hromada: Dokuchaievsk urban hromada
- Founded: 1912
- Area: 11.9 km^{2} (4.6 sq mi)
- Elevation: 135 m (443 ft)
- Population (2022): 22,835
- Climate: Dfa

Dokuchaievsk (Ukrainian: Докучаєвськ, pronounced [dokʊˈtʃɑjeu̯sʲk]) or Dokuchayevsk (Russian: Докучаевск) is a city in Kalmiuske Raion, Donetsk Oblast, eastern Ukraine. It is 14 kilometres (8.7 mi) from Olenivka railway station and 40 kilometres (25 mi) south of Donetsk. It serves as the administrative center of Dokuchaievsk urban hromada. The city is on the river Sukha Volnovakha. Its population is approximately 22,835 (2022 estimate).

Previously it was administratively subordinated to the Volnovakha Raion Council. Named in honor of Vasily Dokuchaev, a natural scientist, founder of scientific genetic soil science and zonal agronomy.

== History ==
It was founded in 1912. It was originally founded as a mine settlement called Olenivski Kariery (Ukrainian: Оленівські Кар'єри, meaning Olenivka Quarry), located in the close vicinity of Olenivka. In 1938, it became urban-type settlement. In 1954, the populated place became a city and was renamed after the Imperial Russian geologist Vasily Dokuchaev.

It was founded in connection with the development of flux limestone and dolomite mining for Petrovsky and Yenakiieve Steel.

In 1939, the town was home to 9.2 thousand people, in 1959 – 16.8 thousand people, and in 2011 – 23.726 thousand people.

Starting in mid-April 2014 Russian-backed separatists captured Dokuchaievsk and several other towns in Donetsk Oblast. Since then the city has been under the control by the Donetsk People's Republic. On 13 January 2015, militants of the DPR's "Oplot" brigade from Dokuchaievsk shelled a checkpoint near Volnovakha, killing 11 civilians in a bus and injuring 17 others.

== Demographics ==
As of the Ukrainian Census of 2001 the population of the city amounted to 24,142 people, of whom 27.32% indicated Ukrainian as their native language, 72.13% – Russian, 0.14% – Armenian and Greek, 0.04% – Belarusian, 0.03% – Moldovan, as well as Bulgarian and Gagauz languages:

Ethnicity

	number	percentage, %
Ukrainians	16,665	66.6
Russians	7,053	28.2
Greeks	533	2.1
Moldovans	240	1.0
Belarusians	128	0.5

Language

- Russian: 72.1%
- Ukrainian: 27.3%

== Industries ==
Europe's largest flux and dolomite plant (including 5 quarries, 3 crushing and processing plants), construction materials production (reinforced concrete products plant), and motor transportation companies. Former Kalinin collective farm, Dokuchaievskyi state farm.

== Cultural and social sphere ==
There are six schools, a palace of culture, a zoo, a stadium, eight libraries, and a hospital.

== Gallery ==
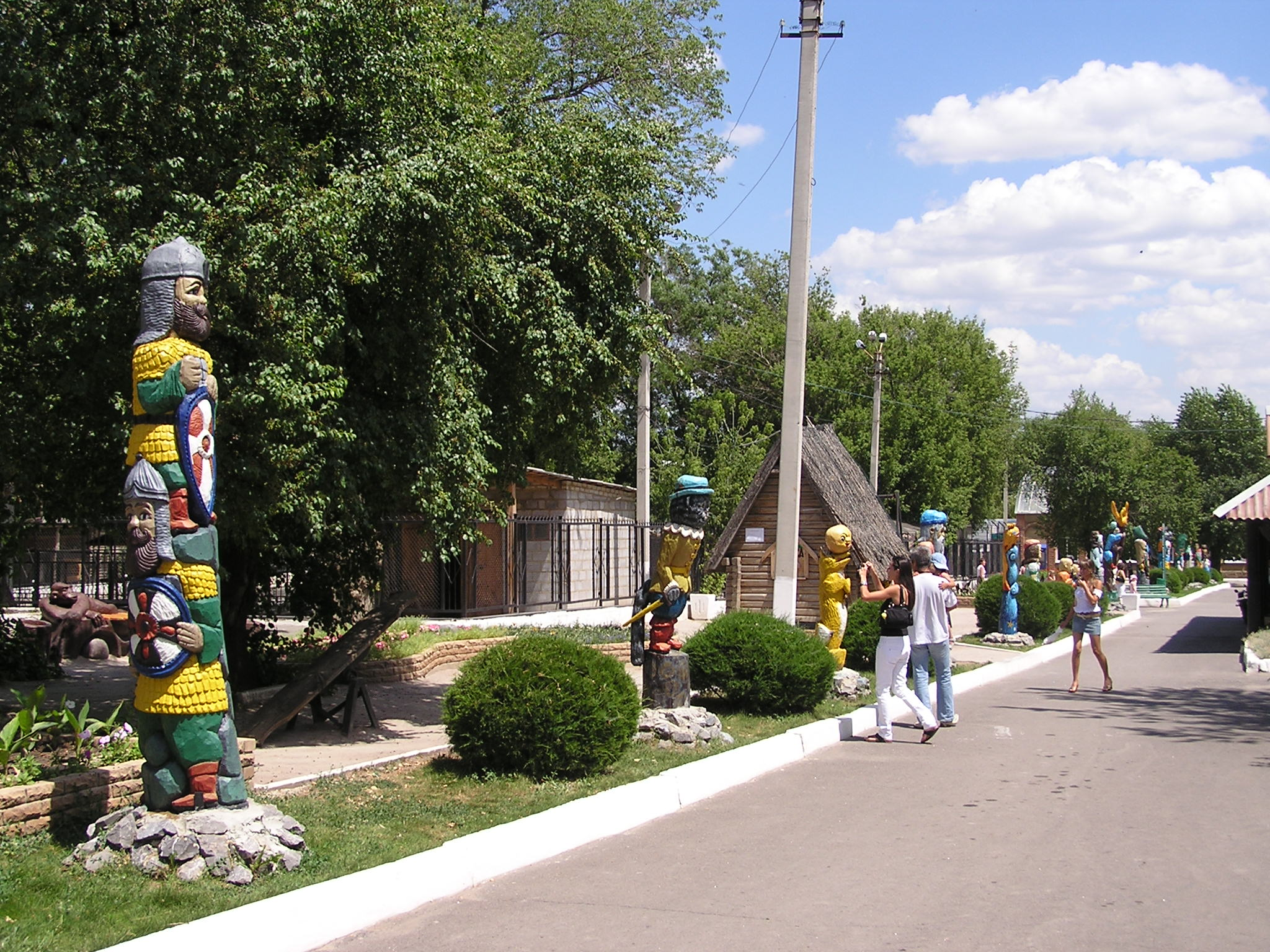
Statues near Dokuchaievsk zoo

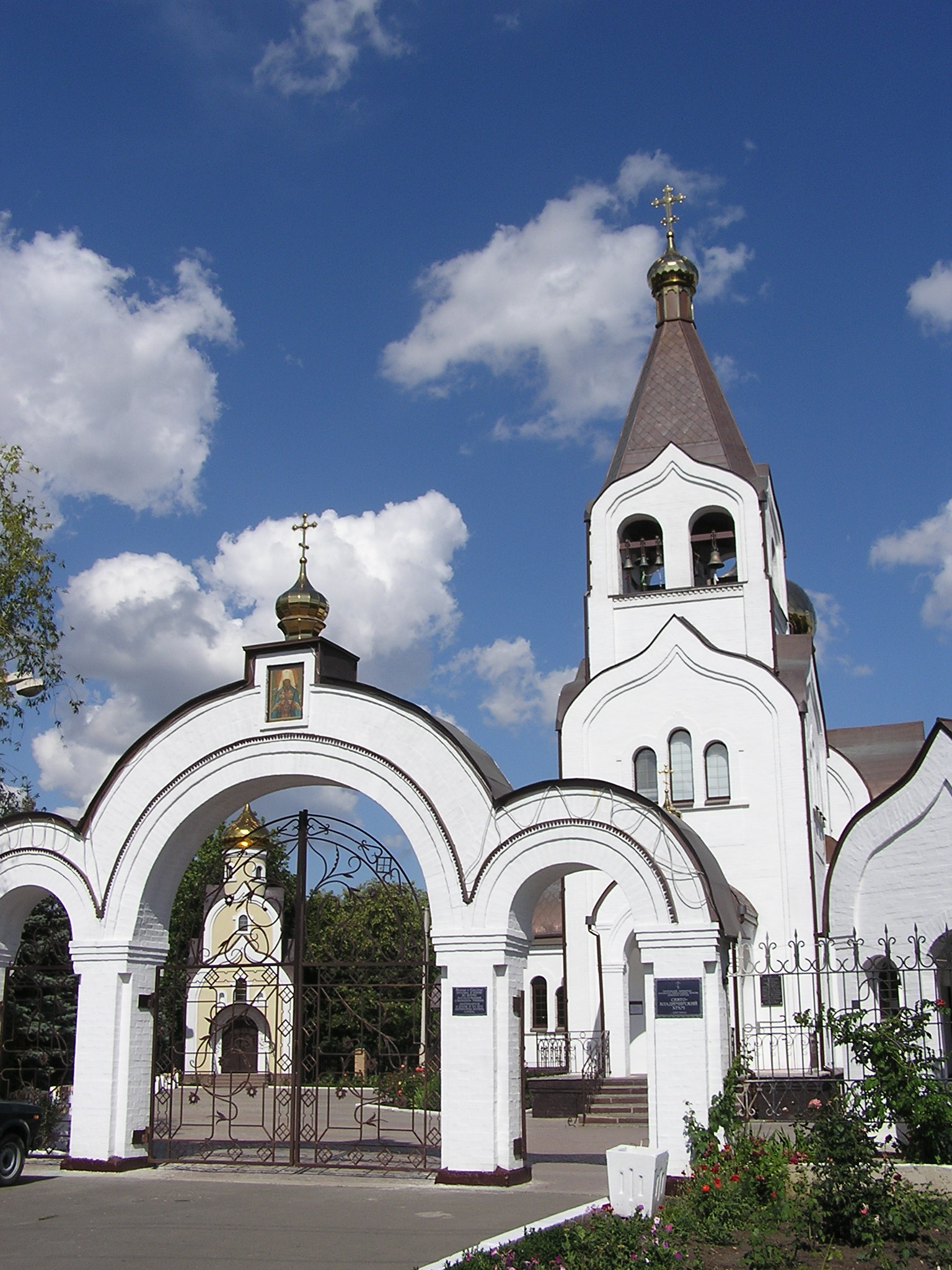
St Vladimir Church

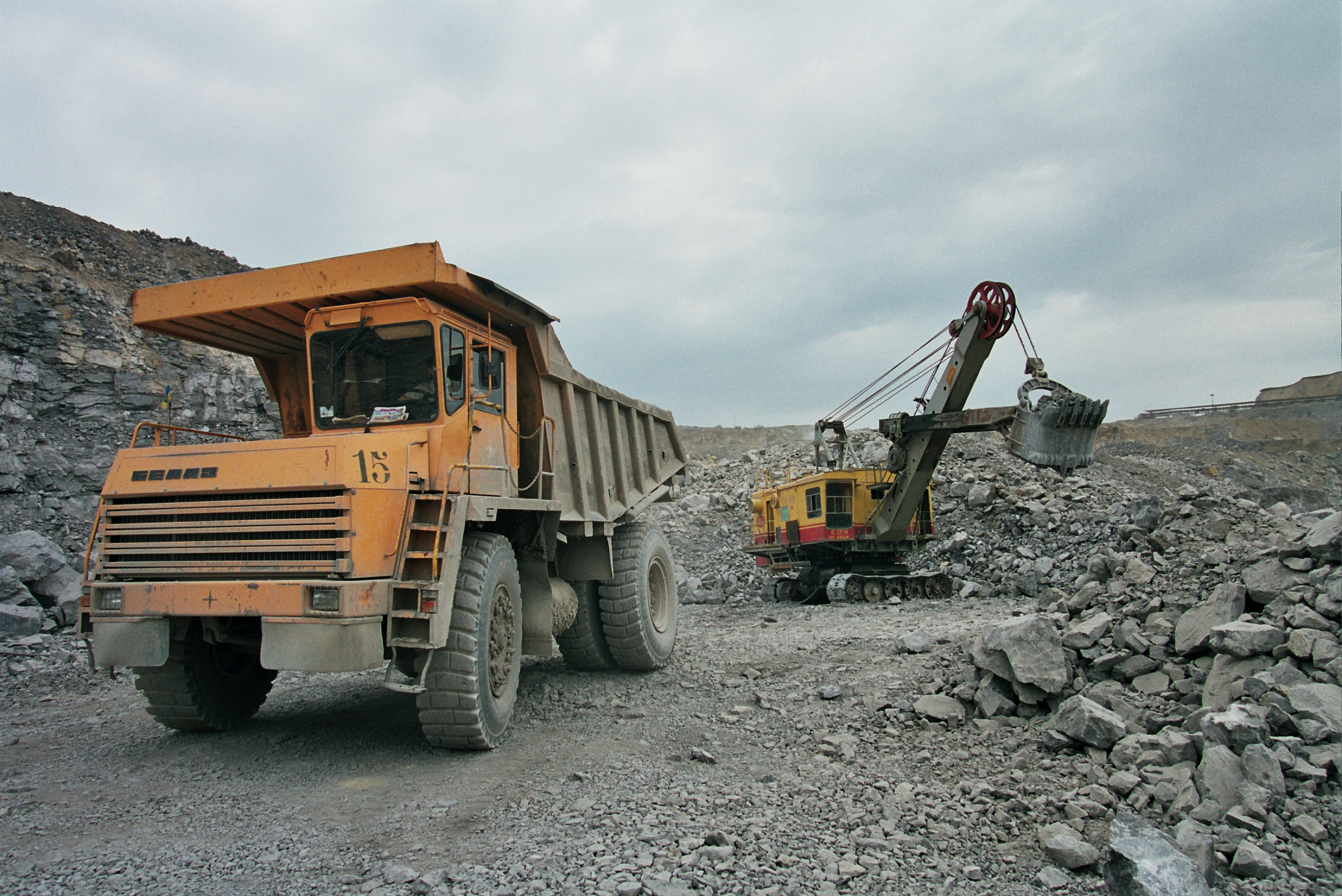
Dolomite quarry near Dokuchaievsk
