= Staromarivka =

Staromarivka Старомар'ївка Старомарьевка
- Village
- Interactive map of Staromarivka
- Location of Staromarivka Staromarivka (Ukraine)
- Coordinates: 47°26′20″N 37°52′34″E
- Country: Ukraine
- Oblast: Donetsk Oblast
- Raion: Volnovakha Raion
- Hromada: Myrne settlement hromada
- Founded: 1873

Area
  - Total: 0.82 km^{2} (0.32 sq mi)
- Elevation: 40 m (130 ft)

Population (2001 census)
  - Total: 305
  - Estimate (October 2024): ▼94
  - Density: 370/km^{2} (960/sq mi)
- Time zone: UTC+2 (EET)
  - Summer (DST): UTC+3 (EEST)
- Postal code: 87123
- Area code: +380 6279

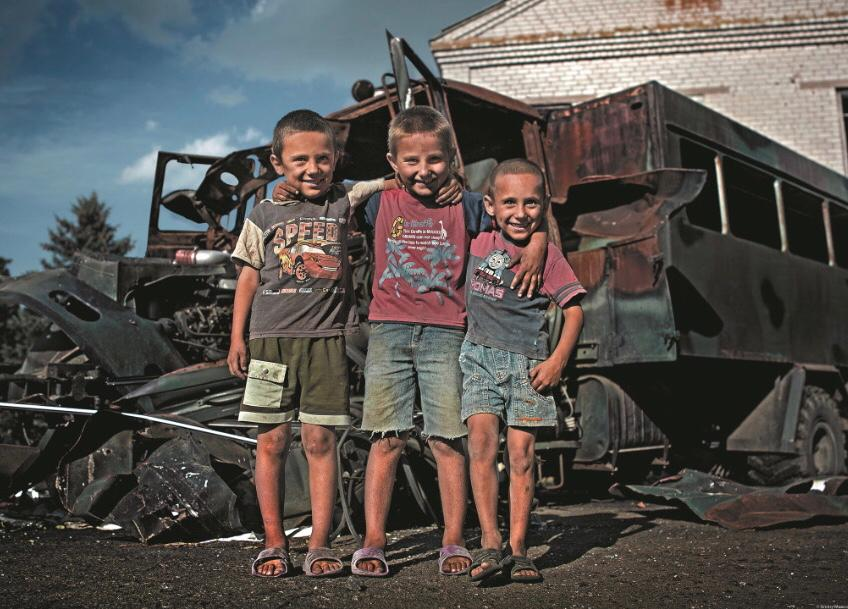
Children of Staromaryevka

Staromarivka (Ukrainian: Старомар'ївка), originally Mariental until 2 June 1945, is a village in Volnovakha (district) in Donetsk Oblast of eastern Ukraine. It is on the left (east) bank of the Kalmius river, just south of the town of Hranitne, which is on the other side of the river.

== Demographics ==
Year	Population
1873	271
1915	560

Native language as of the Ukrainian Census of 2001:

- Ukrainian 37.38%
- Russian 61.97%
- Greek (including Mariupol Greek and Urum) 0.66%
