= Kamianka, Volnovakha Raion, Donetsk Oblast =

Kamianka Кам'янка
- Village
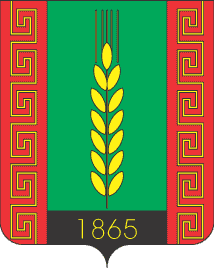
- Coat of arms

- Location of Kamianka within Ukraine
- Coordinates: 47.420278°N 37.698611°E
- Country: Ukraine
- Oblast: Donetsk Oblast
- Raion: Volnovakha Raion
- Hromada: Myrne settlement hromada
- Founded: 1865
- Elevation: 150 m (490 ft)

Population (2001 census)
  - Total: 1,050
- Time zone: UTC+2 (EET)
  - Summer (DST): UTC+3 (EEST)
- Postal code: 87141
- Area code: +380 6279

Kamianka (Ukrainian: Кам'янка; Russian: Каменка; Urum: Йаны Карани) is a village in Volnovakha Raion (district) in Donetsk Oblast of eastern Ukraine, at 86.1 km SSW from the centre of Donetsk city.

== Demographics ==
Native language as of the Ukrainian Census of 2001:

- Ukrainian – 1.9%
- Russian – 97.24%
- Greek (including Mariupol Greek and Urum) – 0.29%
