= Praskovya Angelina =

Soviet war worker

- Прасковья Ангелина
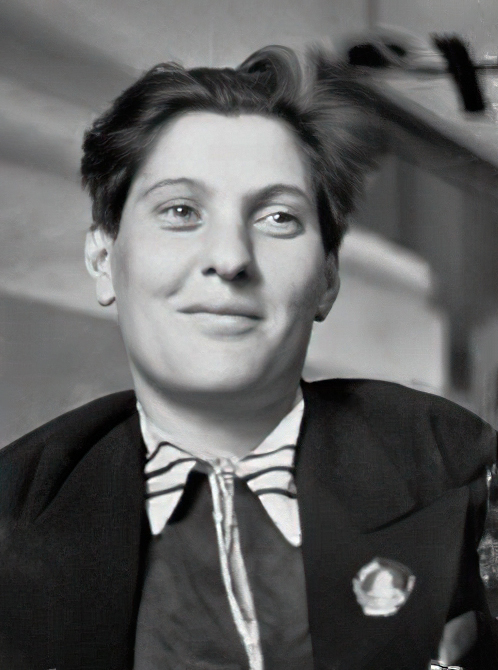
- Angelina in 1936

Deputy of the Supreme Soviet of the Soviet Union
- In office 12 December 1937 – 21 January 1959

Personal details
- Born: 30 December [O.S. 17 December] 1912 Starobesheve, Yekaterinoslav Governorate, Russian Empire
- Died: 21 January 1959 Moscow, Russian SFSR, Soviet Union
- Party: Communist Party of the Soviet Union
- Awards: Hero of Socialist Labour (2); Stalin Prize; Order of Lenin (2); Order of the Red Banner of Labour

Praskovya "Pasha" Nikitichna Angelina (Russian: Прасковья Никитична Ангелина; 30 December [O.S. 17 December] 1912 – 21 January 1959) was a Deputy of the Supreme Soviet of the Soviet Union, udarnik and Stakhanovite at the time of the first Five-Year-Plans. She was recognized as one of the first female tractor-operators in the USSR and became a celebrity as a symbol of the technically educated female Soviet worker.

== Early life ==
Angelina was born in Starobesheve, into a Greek family of peasants. Her father was a farmhand and her mother whitewashed huts. In 1929, she started attending tractor-driving courses in her native oblast while also working at a dairy farm.

== Career ==
In 1933, she organized an all-female tractor team that was reported to have achieved 129% of the quota and thus to have ranked first among the tractor teams of the region. She was made a celebrity, placed prominently in the media and depicted on propaganda posters. Pasha’s rallying speeches at the February 1935 conferences of shock workers and Kolkhoz Shock Workers, along with his address at the Conference of Advanced Agricultural Workers in December 1935. In the same year, she was among the "Champions of Agricultural Labour" selected to hold a conference with the leaders of the Party and state in the Kremlin. At that conference, she officially promised to organize 10 more female tractor teams in her raion. In 1938 she signed an appeal entitled "One hundred thousand (female) friends - onto the tractor!" (Russian: "Сто тысяч подруг - на трактор!"). Women shouldering work with tractors made it possible for more men to be drafted into the Soviet Army before and during World War II. During the Second World War, Angelina studied agriculture in Moscow for two years and then worked as a brigade leader in the Kazakh SSR until the end of hostilities. After the war, she returned to work in the same function in Starobeshevo.

She was elected into the Supreme Soviet of the Soviet Union in 1937, 1946 and 1950.

In 1948, Angelina authored an autobiographical book, The People of the Kolkhoz Fields.

== Death ==
She died of cirrhosis in Moscow in 1959. Angelina was buried in her hometown of Starobesheve. Her grave is now listed as a historic monument of national significance of Ukraine.

== Awards ==
- twice a Hero of Socialist Labour (1947, 1958)
- Stalin Prize (1946)
- three Orders of Lenin
- Order of the Red Banner of Labour

== See also ==
- Naomi Parker Fraley
- Ronnie the Bren Gun Girl
- Rosie the Riveter

== Sources ==
- Great Soviet Encyclopedia, 2nd edition.
- М. Голышев. Первая трактористка // Человек трудом славен. М., 1981.
- Ангелина Прасковья Никитична // Великая Отечественная война 1941 — 1945. Энциклопедия / редколл., гл. ред. М. М. Козлов. М., Советская энциклопедия, 1985. стр.49
