= Boikivske =

Urban locality in Donetsk Oblast, Ukraine

Boikivske Бойкiвське Тельманове Telmanove
- Rural settlement
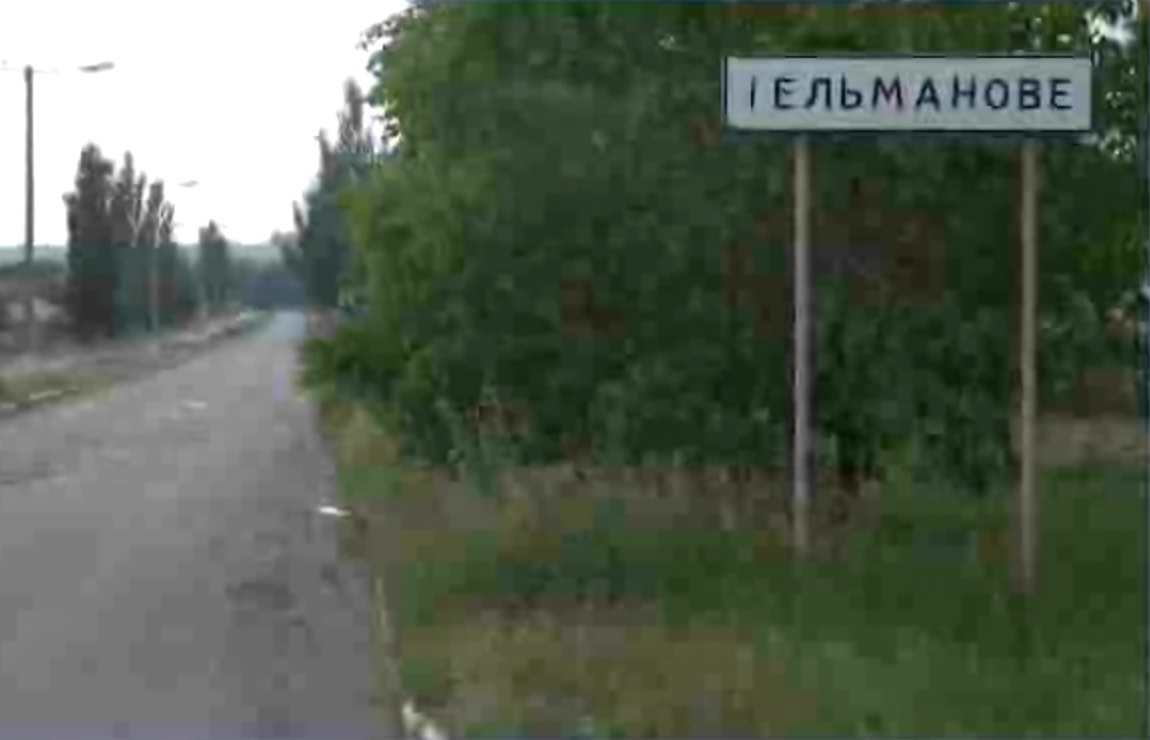
- The road sign outside Telmanove, 2015

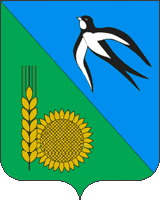
- Coat of arms

- Location within Donetsk Oblast Location within Ukraine
- Coordinates: 47°24′45″N 38°01′05″E
- Country: Ukraine
- Oblast: Donetsk Oblast
- Raion: Kalmiuske Raion
- Hromada: Boikivske settlement hromada
- Founded: 1897

Government
  - Head of town council: Serhij Aleksejenko

Population (2022)
  - Total: 4,219
- Time zone: UTC+2 (EET)
  - Summer (DST): UTC+3 (EEST)

Boikivske (Ukrainian: Бойкiвське; Russian: Бойковское) or Telmanove (Ukrainian: Тельманове; Russian: Тельманово) is a rural settlement in Donetsk Oblast, in eastern Ukraine. It is located in the industrial Donbas region. Its population is 4,219 (2022 estimate).

The settlement has its roots in the German colony of Ostheim, founded in the mid-1800s at the invitation of the government of the Russian Empire. The Soviet Union renamed the town to Telmanove in 1935 after KPD leader Ernst Thälmann. After World War II, the German population was expelled by the Soviet government and the village was repopulated by Boykos.

After becoming part of independent Ukraine in 1991. In August 2014 the town was taken over by the self-proclaimed Donetsk People's Republic (DPR), which aligns itself with the Russian federation. The town has seen the curtailing of religious freedom for minority faiths under the DPR administration. The Ukrainian parliament renamed Telmanove to Boikivske in 2016 as a part of Decommunization in Ukraine, though DPR and Russian authorities still use the old Soviet-era name.

== History ==
=== Founding ===
After the 1783 annexation of the Crimean Khanate by the Russian Empire, the government of the Russian Empire invited foreign colonists to settle Russia's newly acquired lands along the coast of the Black Sea and of the Azov Sea. In one wave of colonization in 1835–1852, 145 ethnic German families were granted land. They founded numerous colonies, including the settlement Ostheim, which would later become Telmanove/Boikivske. The name "Ostheim" can be translated to English as "Eastern Home".

According to the 1897 Russian Empire census, there were 43 households and 358 inhabitants in Ostheim. Of these, 273 were Germans, and 85 were ethnic Russian and Ukrainian laborers who migrated to the colony from other villages and regions.

=== 20th century ===
According to official Soviet sources, by the time immediately preceding World War I, most inhabitants of the village were illiterate, especially the non-Germans. During the war itself, and the subsequent Russian Civil War, Ostheim was taken over by the Central Powers in April 1918 during their invasion of Ukraine. The Central Powers were forced out of the village in November the same year, and Ostheim was captured by forces loyal to the anti-communist White movement. Eventually, the Bolsheviks took over Ostheim in January 1920. The Bolsheviks went on to win the entire civil war, and established the communist Soviet Union on much of the territory of the former Russian Empire.

In late 1934, Ostheim Raion was formed inside Soviet Ukraine, with Ostheim as its center. In 1935, Ostheim was renamed Telmanove after the German Communist Ernst Thälmann, reflecting the village's German population. Ostheim Raion was also renamed to Telmanove Raion to match.

During World War II, Telmanove was occupied by Nazi Germany on 13 October 1941. The Nazis massacred many of the town's residents, and expelled numerous ethnic Russian and Ukrainian families. Telmanove was liberated by the Red Army on 9 September 1943. After the end of the war, in another campaign of ethnic cleansing, the Germans of Telmanove were expelled from the village by the Soviet government. The village was resettled by Boykos deported from territories that were transferred by Soviet Union to Poland in 1951 (see 1951 Polish–Soviet territorial exchange). These Boykos were specifically from an area around what is now Drohobych.

In 1971, Telmanove was granted urban-type settlement status. In 1999, the Ukrainian Orthodox Church – Kyiv Patriarchate (UOC-KP) opened a "House of Mercy" in Telmanove, for treating the elderly and disabled.

=== 21st century ===
During the war in Donbas, in August 2014, Telmanove was seized by the self-proclaimed Donetsk People's Republic. In late 2014 and early 2015, the UOC-KP church of Telmanove was shelled several times and eventually destroyed.

Telmanove was renamed Boikivske by the Verkhovna Rada in 2016 as part of decommunization in Ukraine, in honor of the Boyko deportees. Telmanove Raion was also renamed Boikivske Raion in turn. The settlement is still occasionally referred to by the old name "Telmanove" by Russian government-affiliated sources and even by Ukrainian government officials in less formal contexts.

The Donetsk People's Republic oppressed religious minorities in Telmanove. In an announcement from 29 August, Jehovah’s Witnesses representatives reported that Boikivske was one of the settlements in which separatist authorities had seized their buildings. The United States Commission on International Religious Freedom reported that, in October and November 2018, after the complete banning of Jehovah's Witnesses by the DPR, DPR police in Boikivske had warned local Jehovah's Witnesses during home visits about the ban on their activity and collected signatures as acknowledgement. In 2019, the DPR continued to crack down on religious freedom, specifically against the UOC-KP, due to refusal of their clergy to endorse the DPR government. Among other punishments, the DPR threatened to confiscate the House of Mercy in Boikivske. UOC-KP Bishop of Donetsk and Mariupol Sergius (Horobtsov) said there was "constant persecution, insults and intimidation of all our priests."

Ukrainian authorities abolished Boikivske Raion in 2020 and merged its territory into the newly created Kalmiuske Raion.

On 26 October 2021, the Ukrainian Armed Forces launched an attack on DPR artillery near Boikivske using a Bayraktar TB2 drone, in response to DPR shelling of Ukrainian positions and of the settlement Hranitne. This was the first time Ukrainian forces ever used a Bayraktar drone against pro-Russian separatists in the Russo-Ukrainian War. Representatives of the DPR as well as the Luhansk People's Republic protested this use, claiming it violated the clause in the Minsk agreements banning the use of foreign unmanned aerial vehicles along the contact line. Other analysts said the attack was not along the contact line. Ukrainian commentators reacted to the strike with enthusiasm, predicting that the drones would be "change the rules of the game" of the war. Russian government figures gave contradictory responses to the strike, with Foreign Minister Sergei Lavrov expressing doubt that there had even been a drone used, whereas Vladimir Putin's press secretary Dmitry Peskov condemned the strike and said it risked destabilizing the region.

On 12 November 2023, during the full-scale Russian invasion of Ukraine, the advisor to the exiled mayor of Mariupol, Petro Andriushchenko, announced that Ukrainian forces had successfully struck a Russian headquarters in Telmanove, metaphorically stating that Ukrainian forces "surgically entered the building of the former House of Culture and nearby, where the operational headquarters of the occupiers was located. The result is that the occupiers have decreased by ten or even eleven." He accompanied the announcement with pictures of the attack.

== Demographics ==
Population history
Year	1897	1923	1970	1979	1989	2001	2010	2018	2022
Pop.	358	354	2,900	4,149	5,404	5,337	4,610	4,360	4,219
±% p.a.	—	−0.04%	+4.58%	+4.06%	+2.68%	−0.10%	−1.61%	−0.69%	−0.82%

Native language composition according to the 2001 Ukrainian census:

Native languages in Boikivske
	percent
Ukrainian	57.5%
Russian	42.0%
Greek^{1}	0.3%
Belarusian	0.2%
others	0.1%

^{1} Including Mariupol Greek and Urum

=== Historical population data ===
Ethnic composition according to the first census of the Russian Empire in 1897:

1897 census
	percent
Germans	76.26%
Ukrainians & Russians	23.74%
others	0.0%
