= Molodizhne, Donetsk Oblast =

Coordinates: 47°49′32″N 37°43′11″E

Molodizhne (Ukrainian: Молодіжне) is a rural settlement in Ukraine, located in Volnovakha Raion of Donetsk Oblast. Since August 2014, it has been occupied by separatist forces of the Donetsk People's Republic.

== Demographics ==
According to the 2001 census, the village had a population of 157. Of these, 68.15% declared their native language to be Ukrainian and 29.3% Russian.
