= Hranitne, Volnovakha Raion =

Hranitne Гранітне
- Village
- Interactive map of Hranitne
- Location of Hranitne within Ukraine Hranitne (Ukraine)
- Coordinates: 47°27′13″N 37°52′3″E
- Country: Ukraine
- Oblast: Donetsk Oblast
- Raion: Volnovakha Raion
- Hromada: Myrne settlement hromada
- Founded: 1780
- Elevation: 48 m (157 ft)

Population (2001 census)
  - Total: 3,615
- Time zone: UTC+2 (EET)
  - Summer (DST): UTC+3 (EEST)
- Postal code: 87123
- Area code: +380 6279

Hranitne (Ukrainian: Гранітне; Russian: Гранитное; Greek: Γράνιτνα) is a village in Volnovakha Raion (district) in the Donetsk Oblast of eastern Ukraine. The village is situated on the right (west) bank of the Kalmius river. The much smaller village of Staromarivka is just to the south, but on the other side of the river. There is a granite quarry just west of Hranitne.

The Kalmius became the boundary between Donetsk People's Republic-controlled territory on the east bank of the river, and Ukrainian government-controlled territory on the west bank, after an offensive by the Russian-backed forces of the Donetsk People's Republic in August 2014 during the War in Donbass.

The war has caused civilian and military casualties. On 26 February 2016 the spokesman of the Presidential Administration on issues related to ATO reported that a Ukrainian serviceman was killed in the village the previous day.

== Demographics ==
The population consists mainly of Urums (Turkic-speaking Greeks), who migrated there from the Crimean peninsula in the end of the 18th century.

Population
1859	1908	1935	2001
2,425	3,270	2,281	3,576
