= Starobesheve Raion =

Former subdivision of Donetsk Oblast, Ukraine, in use by the Donetsk People's Republic

Starobeshivskyi Raion Старобешівський район
- Raion
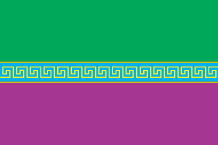
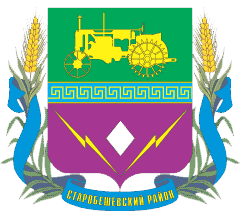
- Flag Coat of arms

- Coordinates: 47°45′12″N 38°1′54″E
- Country: Ukraine
- Oblast: Donetsk Oblast
- Established: 1923
- Disestablished: 18 July 2020
- Admin. center: Starobesheve
- Subdivisions: List: 1 — city councils; 2 — settlement councils; 11 — rural councils; Number of localities: 1 — cities; 2 — urban-type settlements; 48 — villages; 9 — rural settlements

Government
  - Governor: Vasyl′ Pan′ko

Area
  - Total: 1,282 km^{2} (495 sq mi)

Population (2020)
  - Total: 49,313 ▼
  - Density: 38.47/km^{2} (99.63/sq mi)
- Time zone: UTC+02:00 (EET)
  - Summer (DST): UTC+03:00 (EEST)
- Postal index: 87200—87272
- Area code: +380 6253

Starobesheve Raion (Ukrainian: Старобешівський район) was one of the raions of Donetsk Oblast, located in southeastern Ukraine. Its administrative center was the urban-type settlement of Starobesheve.The raion was abolished on 18 July 2020 as part of the administrative reform of Ukraine, which reduced the number of raions of Donetsk Oblast to eight. The last estimate of the raion population, reported by the Ukrainian government, was 49,313 (2020 est.).

Since 2014, the raion has not been under control of the Ukrainian government and has been controlled by the Donetsk People's Republic militant group, which continues using it as an administrative unit.

== Demographics ==
According to the 2001 Ukrainian Census:

Ethnicity		
Ukrainians	29,170	52.1%
Russians	17,761	31.7%
Greeks	7,491	13.4%
Belarusians	397	0.7%
Azerbaijanis	241	0.4%
Germans	171	0.3%
Armenians	122	0.2%
