= Kalmiuske Raion =

Subdivision of Donetsk Oblast, Ukraine

Coordinates: 47°38′N 38°06′E

Kalmiuske Raion Кальміуський район
- Raion
- Interactive map of Kalmiuske Raion
- Country: Ukraine
- Oblast: Donetsk Oblast
- Established: 2020
- Admin. center: Kalmiuske
- Subdivisions: 5 hromadas

Area
  - Total: 3,132.6 km^{2} (1,209.5 sq mi)

Population (2022)
  - Total: 120,769
  - Density: 38.552/km^{2} (99.850/sq mi)

Kalmiuske Raion (Ukrainian: Кальміуський район, romanized: Kalmiuskyi raion, Russian: Кальмиусский район, romanized: Kalmiussky rayon) is a prospective raion (district) of Donetsk Oblast, Ukraine. It was formally created in July 2020 as part of the reform of administrative divisions of Ukraine. The center of the raion is in the city of Kalmiuske. Population: 120,769 (2022 estimate).

Until the Russian invasion of Ukraine in 2022, the village of Slavne was the only locality of the raion under Ukrainian government control. The raion is occupied by Russia, which continues to use the pre-2020 administrative divisions of Ukraine.

== Subdivisions ==
The raion consists of five hromadas:

- Boikivske settlement hromada
- Dokuchaievsk urban hromada
- Kalmiuske urban hromada
- Novoazovsk urban hromada
- Starobesheve settlement hromada
