= Eviction of Christians from the Crimea (1778) =

Russian resettlement of Armenians and Greeks

Eviction of Christians from the Crimea in 1778
- Native name: Виведення християн з Криму в 1778 р.
- Date: Relocation from Crimea to Katerynoslav lasted July 26 – November 24, 1778; Relocation to Pryazovia began in November 1779
- Location: Crimea, Pryazovia, Yekaterinoslav
- Motive: A request from the metropolitan of Crimea, Ignatius, that Crimean Christians be made Russian subjects; A desire to eliminate ethnic tensions between Tatars and Christians within Crimea; A desire to colonize the unpopulated Pryazovia region; A desire to bring about an annexation of the Crimean peninsula
- Organized by: Russian Empire
- Outcome: 31,386 Greeks and Armenians resettled from Crimea, extinction of Crimean Goths

The Eviction of Christians from the Crimea in 1778 (Note: Also known as the Exodus of the Christians from the Crimea, and the Deportation of the Christians from the Crimea.) (Ukrainian: Виведення християн з Криму в 1778 р.; Russian: Вывод христиан из Крыма в 1778 г.) was a historical event in which the Greek (Note: Including both the Grecophone Rumaiic Greeks and the Turkophone Urum Greeks.) and Armenian populations of Crimea were resettled by the authorities of the Russian Empire to newly founded settlements in Pryazovia, taking place in 1778 on order of Empress Catherine the Great.

== Background ==
In 1768, Russia began a new round of hostilities against the Ottoman Empire, and by June 1771 an army under the command of Prince Vasily Dolgorukov-Krymsky had captured the entirety of the Crimean peninsula. As a result of the end of the war and the signing of the Treaty of Küçük Kaynarca, Crimea was effectively ceded to the Russian Empire as a client state. At the start of 1775, however, Ottoman forces intervened in Crimea, in violation of the Küçük Kaynarca Treaty, and, after ousting Sahib II Giray from power, installed Devlet IV Giray as the new khan of Crimea. This resulted in Russian military intervention on 23 November 1776, with Catherine the Great proclaiming the Russian-aligned Şahin Giray as the new Khan. His status as Khan was approved by the Crimean State council on 28 March 1777, who then also appealed to Russian authorities with a request for the Russian military presence in Crimea to be maintained indefinitely, in order to prevent any future Ottoman interference. Despite this, the Ottoman Empire refused to recognize Şahin Giray's legitimacy, with Sultan Abdulhamid I remarking: "[Şahin] Giray is a tool. The aim of the Russians is to take Crimea." In December 1777, the Ottoman Empire once again attempted to appoint to the Crimean throne a khan of its choosing, Selim III Giray. Although Selim Giray managed to arrive in Crimea and met with local rebels, Russia intercepted and prevented the landing of the Turkish military force that was planned to assist him. This was followed on 17 February 1778 by the surrounding and surrender of Selim Giray's force, forcing him to renounce power and recognize Şahin Giray's rule as legitimate. Following these failed attempts at altering the status quo in Crimea, as well as a threat by Russian ambassador Alexander Stakhiev that France would intervene on behalf of Russia if the Ottomans did not cease these attempts, the Sublime Porte eventually recognized Şahin Giray's legitimacy.

Russia had long sought to pacify its notoriously unstable southern frontier and coastline with the Black Sea, and, as a consequence of finally having established control over the Crimean peninsula, was now able to move populations and change demographics towards that objective. Following the installation of Şahin Giray as the head of the Crimean Khanate in February 1778, as well as a request from metropolitan bishop of Crimea Ignatius that Crimean Christians be made subjects of the Russian state, Pyotr Rumyantsev and Grigory Potemkin began planning a method for the resettlement of the Greek and Armenian populations of the region. One primary motivation for this plan was a desire to eliminate the ethnic tensions between Tatars and Christians within Crimea, which had been raised as result of the Russian military intervention. Another motivation was the desire to colonize the unpopulated Pryazovia region on the Black Sea shore. Additionally, the exodus of the Christians, who were the wealthiest subjects of the Crimean khan, would cause the Khanate to lose tax revenue and become more dependent on Russia, eventually leading to its complete integration. Regarding Russian intentions to make use of the relocation to induce an annexation of Crimea, Pyotr Rumyantsev stated to Catherine the Great:

«Вывод христиан может почесться завоеванием знатной провинции.» ("The removal of the Christians [from Crimea] can be considered [as equal to] the conquest of that great province.")

While some in the Russian court, such as military head of Crimea Alexander Prozorovsky, opposed the implementation of this plan, Catherine the Great approved it, signing the decree "On the resettlement of all Christians to the southern Russian countryside" on 9 March 1778. The following month, Alexander Suvorov was appointed in place of Prozorovsky to implement the relocation.

== Relocation ==
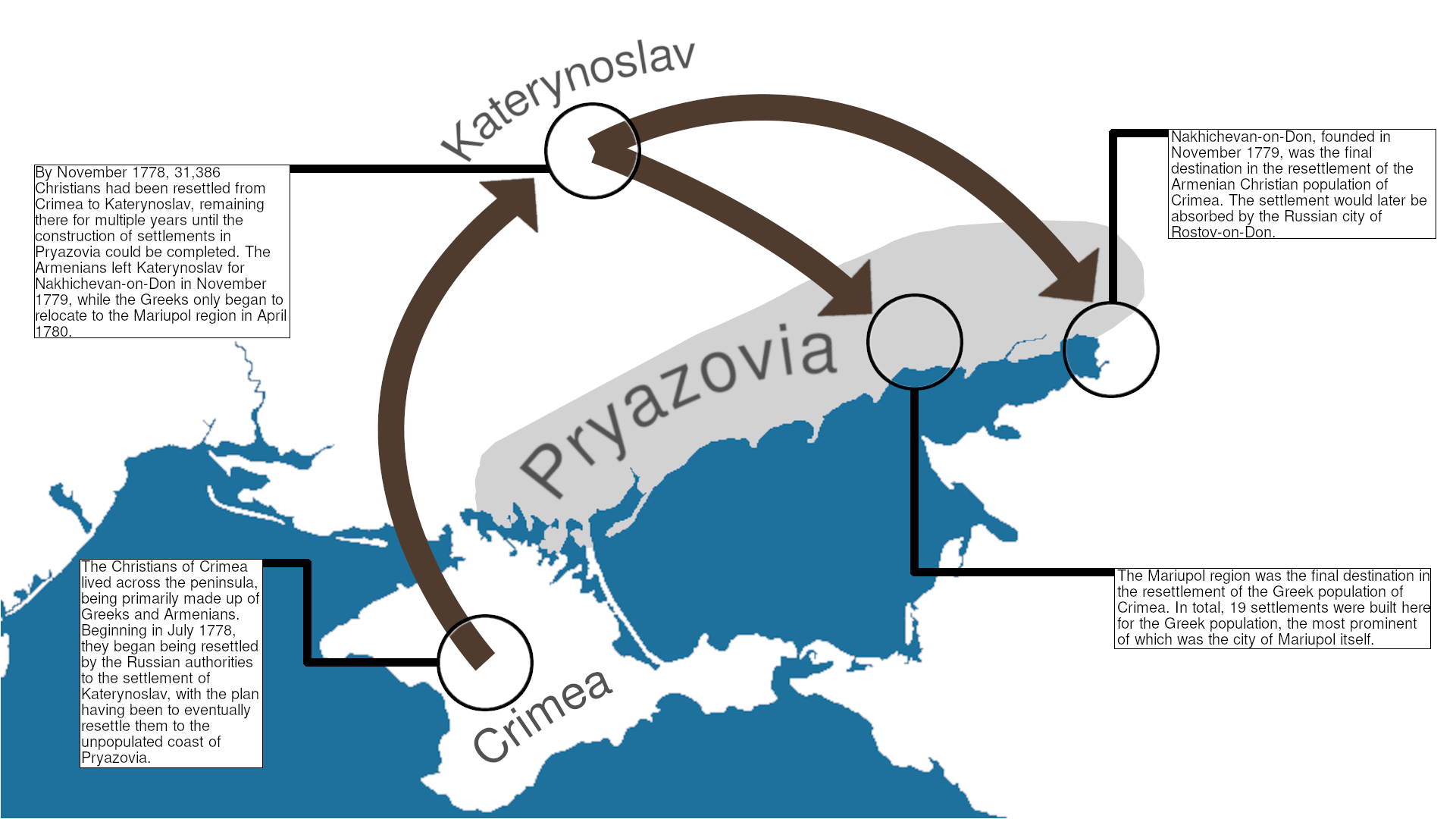
Map depicting the locations Greeks and Armenians were resettled

=== Relocation from Crimea ===
Subsequent to the appointment of Alexander Suvorov to the head of the military administration over Crimea in April 1778, the process of preparing the relocation of the Christian population officially began, with the help of metropolitan bishop Ignatius in its implementation. Once rumors of the relocation began to spread among the Crimean population, they were initially denied by Crimean khan Şahin Giray on 18 July 1778, who was at the time unaware of its preparation. Following this, on the same day, the mayor of Kezlev (Note: Known today as Yevpatoria.) reported to the khan that metropolitan Ignatius had requested the Russian authorities to withdraw all Christians from the city, at which point some local Christians opposed to this requested the mayor to intervene. On 21 July, the Russian government officially informed the khan about the ongoing preparations, prompting him to write a letter to Russian resident minister Andrei Konstantinov with his objections, in which he requested to be given the power to prevent the relocation from taking place:

«Большая половина не согласна отсель отлучаться, в котором прошу дать мне полномочие хорошим способом докончить сие дело.»

Which translates to:

More than half [of the Christians of Crimea] do not wish to be relocated, and I ask you to give me the authority to end this matter in a positive way.

However, by 23 July 1778 Şahin Giray had realized the futility of any resistance to the royal decree of Catherine the Great, and signed an order announcing the withdrawal of Christians from Crimea. Additionally, he called on the inhabitants of the Crimean Khanate not to resist the relocation measures.

The first wave of the resettlement began on 26 July, with the process continuing until 24 November when the last batch of immigrants were resettled to the city of Katerynoslav, (Note: Known today as Dnipro.) along with metropolitan bishop Ignatius himself. A total of 31,386 people were resettled from Crimea, with only 288 Christians remaining within the peninsula by the time the resettlement had been completed. According to Alexander Suvorov, the whole process cost the Russian Imperial government around 130,000 rubles to implement.

During the time of the migrants in Katerynoslav, they were held in the homes of other peasants and unable to participate in agriculture, resulting in a difficult economic situation for them.

=== Relocation to Pryazovia ===
In April 1780, the Greeks temporarily being held in Katerynoslav began to be settled in a number of newly founded Greek settlements of Pryazovia, which had been allotted to them by the Russian government. Of the 19 settlements established for the Greeks, the most prominent would become the city of Mariupol, which was settled c. 1780 – c. 1781 on the territory of the former settlement of Domakha in the Kalmius Palanka region, itself abandoned shortly antecedently with the liquidation of the Zaporozhian army in 1775.

In the territory of the Greek district, the Greeks founded 21 settlements: Beshevo, Bohatyr, Bolshaya Karakuba, Bolshoy Yanisol, Georgiyevka, Komar, Karan, Kermenchik, Konstantinopol, Laspa, Malyi Yanisol, Mangush, Sartana, Staryi Krym, Styla, Ulakly, Dzhemrek, Cherdakly, Chermalyk, Urzuf and Yalta.

Unlike the Greeks, Armenians were relocated to the newly established settlement of Nakhchivan-on-Don in November 1779, named after the South Caucasian city of Nakhchivan., alongside with five nearby villages (Chaltyr, Krym, Sultan-Saly, Bolshiye Saly and Nesvetai).

Whether the resettlement was voluntary or involuntary remains a highly debated topic among historians today, but it is clear that the Christians of Crimea were, at the very least, heavily persuaded by Russia via a propaganda campaign led by the Russian state and the Eastern Orthodox Church, which took advantage of existing social tensions in Crimea between Christian minorities and the ruling Muslim Tatars. While some historians classify it as a forced deportation, this is rejected by the majority today.

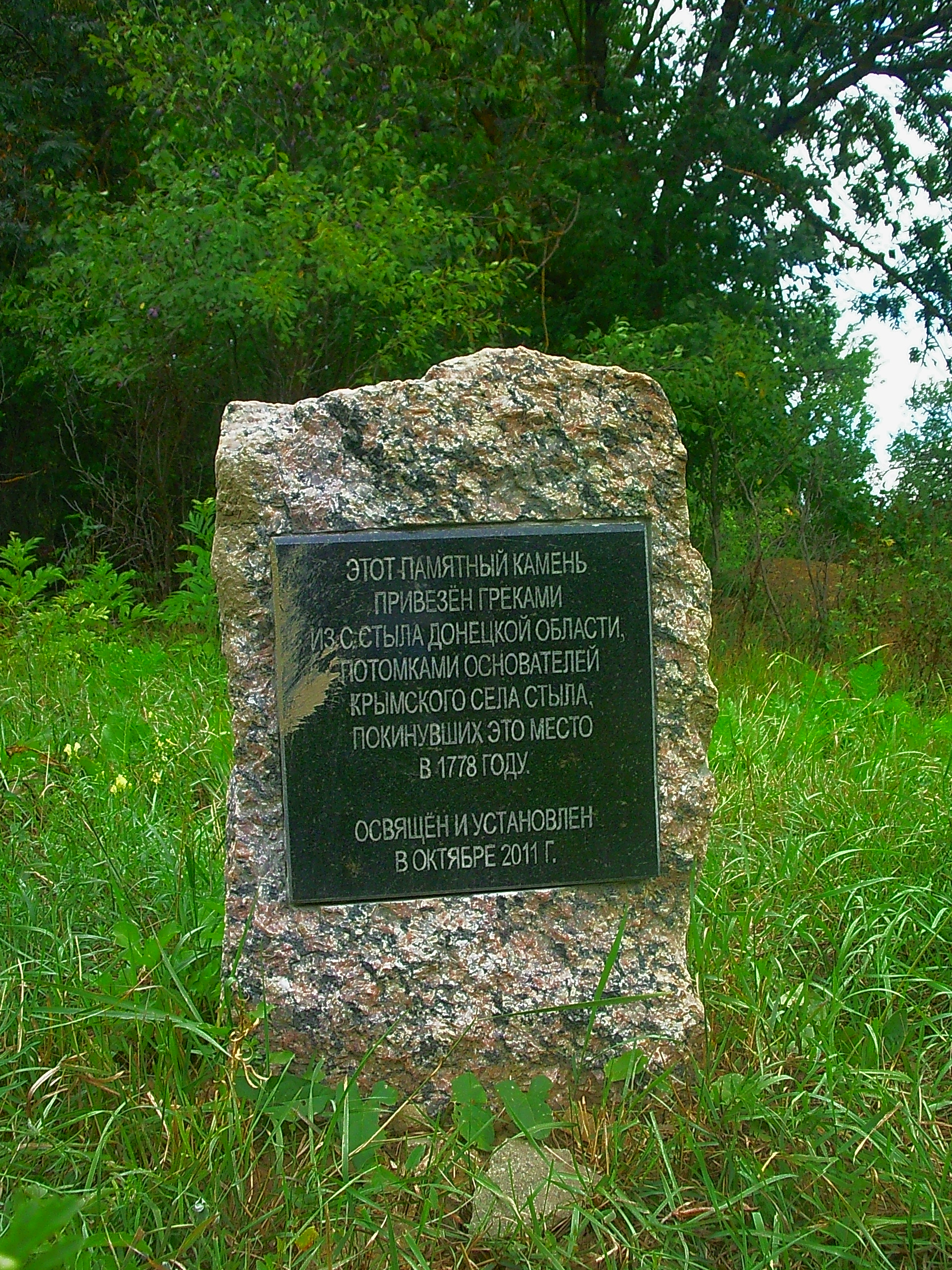
Monument to the deportation in Lisnykove, Crimea

== Aftermath ==
After the resettlement had finished, some Armenians and Greeks later returned to Crimea, although most chose to remain in the regions to which they were resettled. The resettled were, for the most part, treated well by the Russian authorities and allowed to retain their local customs. On 14 November 1779 the Russian government instituted the "Charters Granted to Christians of the Greek and Armenian Denominations Who Migrated from the Crimea to Settle in the Azov Province," which gave the migrants the right to administer themselves according to their own legal norms and exempted them from mandatory military service. It has been speculated that the resettlement led to the extinction of Crimean Gothic.

Within the Russian Empire, the resettlement was greatly praised. Vasily Petrov wrote a poem titled "To Prince [Grigory] Aleksandrovich Potemkin," in which he celebrates the Russian leadership for their role in the exodus of the peninsula's Armenians and Greeks, calling it the result of divine intervention which allowed the state to "regenerate foreign peoples into Russian".

While the Russian state officially paid khan Şahin Giray 50,000 rubles as compensation, this was not nearly enough to make up for the economic damage that had resulted from the exodus of the Christians. The financial ruin caused by the relocation caused Şahin Giray to resign from his position, eventually leading to the annexation of Crimea by the Russian Empire in 1783 and an end to the over three century-long existence of the Crimean Khanate.

== List ==
Number of Christians that got evicted from Crimea and their original home settlement, as compiled by Alexander Suvorov in 1778:

Greeks

- Kafa (1643), Bakhchysaray (1619), Bolshaya Karakuba (Argin-Karakuba) (1395), Steli (Stilya) (1229), Karasubazar (1004), Yanisol (Yeni-Sala) (831), Sartana (743), Mangush (763), Bishui (686), Kamara (475), Kermenchik (465), Laki (406), Zhemrek (372), Bolshogo Lombata (357), Yankul (354), Chermalyk (346), Karan (331), Cherkes-Kermen (307), Yalsy (289), Malaya Karakuba (244), Yalta (240), Massandra (230), Biyasalo (225), Yana (Ayan) (222), Ulakly (215), Temerchi (190), Kyzyltash (183), Magarach (174), Kozlov (172), Autka (167), Cherdakly (154), Shury (151), Laspi (128), Kuchyuguzen (126), Uloyezen (124), Ushunyu (Ishun) (124), Albat (113), Staryi Krym (109), Baysu (107), Kurouzen (103), Marmara (103), Topchak (103), Nikita (102), Katagor (97), Burunduk-Otar (96), Balaklava (82), Gurza (82), Kachkalyan (77), Amaret (76), Malogo Lombata (75), Koz (74), Belbek (70), Malogo Yankuli (68), Sloboda Milyary (Degermenkoy) (57), Shalen (51), Kush (Koush) (49), Churuksu (46), Inkerman (41), Utara (38), Vurtoln (Urtalak) (33), Tole (32), Khaita (Khayto) (21), Sultan-Saly (15), Zuya (5), Dair (4)

Armenians

- Kafa (5511), Karasubazar (2809), Bakhchysaray (1375), Kozlov (1304), Urtalak (406), Ak-mechet (259), Sale (224), Toply (212), Staryi Krym (160), Kamyshlak (Kamyshlyk) (121), Melik (Melek) (72), Sultan-Sala (57), Churuksu (40), Burunduk-Otar (38), Topchak (10)

Georgians

- Kozlov (Captives 70), Beshutka (41), Bakhchysaray (27, Captives 9), Kafa (24), Kakchioy (19), Karasubazar (8), Chermalyk (4), Urtalak (1)

Wallachians

- Abdal (149), Karasubazar (7), Bakhchysaray (Captives 4)

== Bibliography ==
- Rochechouart, Louis-Victor-Léon (1889). Memoirs of the Revolution, the Empire and the Restoration. Russian voices of the Napoleonic Wars. Vol. 5. Translated by Mikaberidze, Alexander (1st ed.). Lulu Press (published 2019). ISBN 978-0-359-86624-3 – via Google Books.
- Fisher, Alan Washburn (1978). Vucinich, Wayne S. (ed.). The Crimean Tatars. Studies of Nationalities in the USSR (1st ed.). Stanford, California: Hoover Institution Press. ISBN 978-0817966621 – via Google Books.
- Schütz, Edmond (1987). "Review: V. B. Barkhudarian. History of the Armenian Settlement of Nor Nakhichevan". Acta Orientalia Academiae Scientiarum Hungaricae. 41 (2). Akadémiai Kiadó: 333–337. JSTOR 23657711.
- Butkevych, Volodymyr Hryhorovych (1992). Kachmarsky, Eugene S. (ed.). Who Has A Right To Crimea?. InfoUkes Inc.
- Kozina, N. I. (1995). "З історії переселення греків з Криму на Маріупольщину: Митрополит Ігнатій (Газадінов)" [From the history of the relocation of the Greeks from the Crimea to the Mariupol region: Metropolitan Ignatius (Gazadinov)]. Регіональне і загальне в історії: Тези міжнародної наукової конференції, присвяченої 140-річчю від дня народження Д.І.Яворницького та 90-літтю XIII Археологічного з'їзду (9 листопада 1995 р.) [Regional and general in history: Abstracts from the international scientific conference dedicated to the 140th anniversary of the birth of D.I. Yavornytsky and the 90th anniversary of the XIII Archaeological Congress (9 November 1995)]. By Beketov, V. M. (in Ukrainian). Dnipro: Institute of History of Ukraine. pp. 262–264. ISBN 5-7707-8671-X – via Dmytro Yavornytsky National Historical Museum of Dnipropetrovsk.
- Hedo, Anna Volodymyrivna (2001). "Переселення греків з Криму до Приазов'я у 1778 р." [The migration of Greeks from the Crimea to the Pryazovia region in 1778] (PDF). Ukrainian Historical Journal (in Ukrainian) (1). Mariupol: 73–84. ISSN 0130-5247 – via Institute of History of Ukraine.
- Schönle, Andreas Xavier (Spring 2001). "Garden of the Empire: Catherine's Appropriation of the Crimea". Slavic Review. 60 (1). Cambridge University Press (published 27 January 2017): 1–23. doi:10.2307/2697641. JSTOR 2697641. PMID 18727221. S2CID 159492185.
- Stearns, MacDonald (1989). "Das Krimgotische". In Beck, Heinrich (ed.). Germanische Rest- und Trümmersprachen. Berlin/New York: de Gruyter. pp. 175–194. doi:10.1515/9783110864717.175. ISBN 978-3-11-011948-0.
- Özer, Abdürrahim (August 2008). Kırımlı, Hakan (ed.). The Ottoman-Russian relations between the years 1774–1787 (PDF) (Master's thesis). Ankara: Bilkent University. hdl:11693/15445.
- Zharkykh, Mykola (2016). Bakhchisarai Assumption rock. Kyiv – via Academia.edu.
