= Vyshneve, Crimea =

Village in Crimea

Vyshneve: Vişnövoye (Crimean Tatar); Вишне́ве (Ukrainian); Вишнёвое (Russian)
- Village
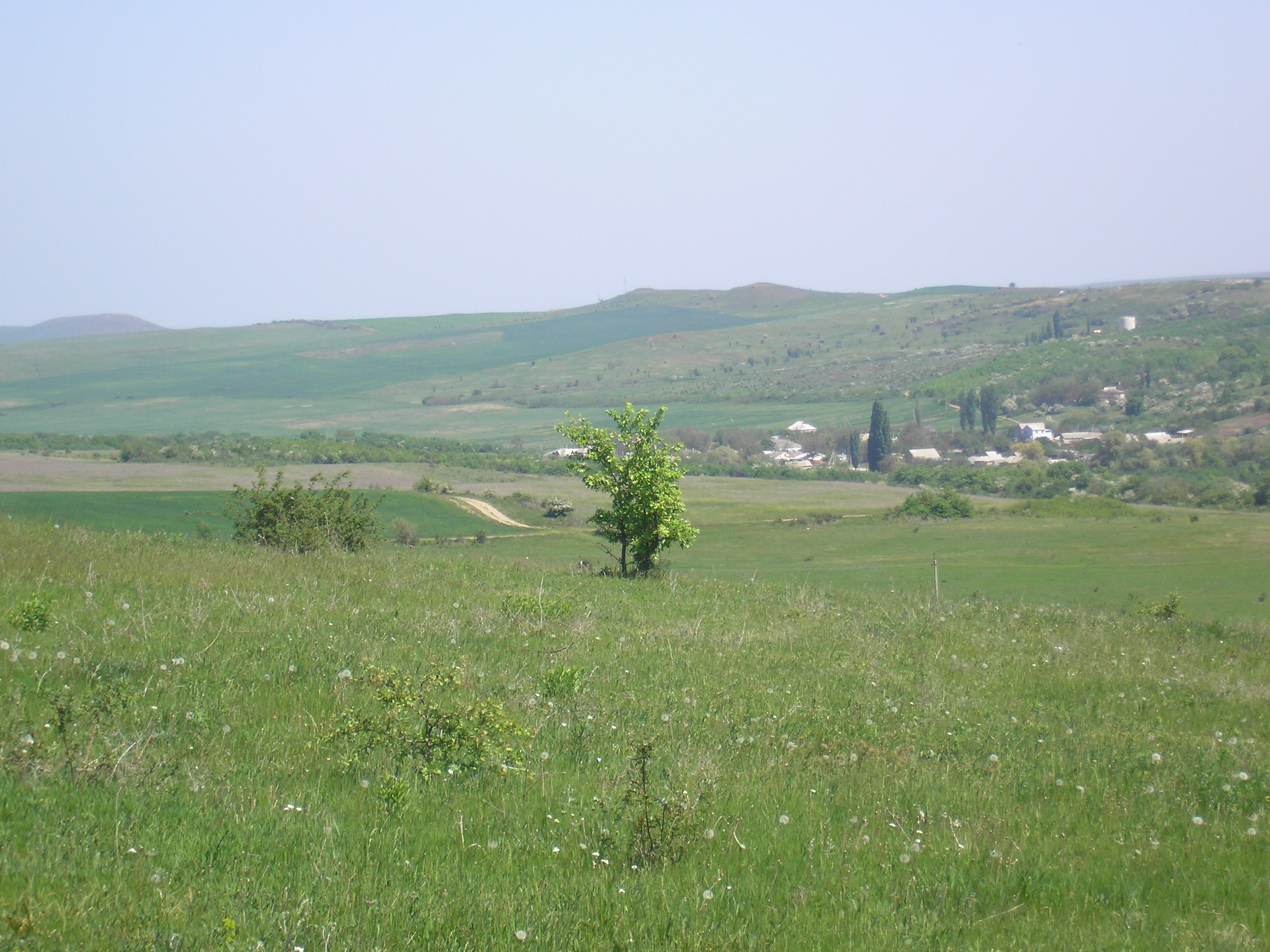
- Interactive map of Vyshneve
- Location of Vyshneve Vyshneve (Ukraine)
- Coordinates: 45°1′40″N 34°20′12″E
- Country: Ukraine (occupied by Russia)
- Autonomous republic: Crimea
- District: Bilohirsk Raion
- Elevation: 292 m (958 ft)

Population (2014)
  - Total: 249
- Time zone: UTC+2 (EET)
  - Summer (DST): UTC+3 (EEST)
- Postal code: 97633
- Area code: +380 6559

Vyshneve (Crimean Tatar: Vişnövoye; Ukrainian: Вишне́ве; Russian: Вишнёвое; lit. "cherries, cherry") is a village in Crimea, located in the Bilohirsk Raion. It is a part of the Krymskorozyvska Rural Council. The village is situated in the western part of the district.

== Demographics ==
According to a 2014 census, the village had a population of 249 people.

Population
Year	1915	1926	1989	2001	2009	2014
Population	29	35	120	259	313	249

=== Native languages ===
The following table displays the reported native languages of the 259 residents who responded to the 2001 Ukrainian census:

Language	Percentage
Crimean Tatar	65.80%
Russian	30.48%
Ukrainian	1.86%
Belarusian	0.37%

== Geography ==
Vyshneve spans 64 hectares and is part of the Krymskorozyvska Rural Council. It is located 7 km west of Krymska Roza. As of 2017, the village has three streets: Amet-Khan-Sultan, Lesnaya, and Tsentralnaya (Russian: Амет-Хан-Султана Улица, Лесная Улица, Центральная Улица). Vyshneve is located in Bilohirsk Raion, on the eastern bank of the Zuya river, a tributary of the Salhyr. The village resides within the northern foothills of the Inner Ridge of the Crimean Mountains. The village is 292 m above sea level, and neighbours the villages of Zuya, Balanove, and Krasnohirske. The distance to the district centre is about 27 km. The nearest railway station is Simferopol railway station, about 26 km away.

== History ==
The village, originally known as the farmstead Novo-Alekseevka (Russian: Ново-Алексеевка; Crimean Tatar: نو و آله که به فکا), likely emerged in the early 1900s. According to the 1915 Statistical Handbook of the Taurida Governorate, Part II, Statistical Sketch, issue six, the village of Novo-Alekseevka in the Zuya Volost (a former administrative subdivision) of Simferopol Uyezd (another former administrative subdivision) had 7 households with a population of 29 people, including 14 men and 15 women. The residents owned 30 desyatinas (about 32.7 acres) of arable land and 212 desyatinas (about 231.08 acres) of non-arable land. Their farms had 18 horses, 5 cows, and 10 head of small livestock, although it was not marked on a later 1922 map.

After the establishment of Soviet power in Crimea, the volost system was abolished by a decree of the Crimean Revolutionary Committee on 8 January 1921, and the village was included in the newly formed Pidgorodne-Petrivske Raion of Simferopol Uyezd. In 1922, uyezds were renamed to raions (Russian: Районы, lit. 'districts'). On 11 October 1923, according to a decree by the All-Russian Central Executive Committee (VTSIK), administrative changes were made in the Crimean Autonomous Soviet Socialist Republic (Crimean ASSR), resulting in the elimination of Pidgorodne-Petrivske Raion and the inclusion of the village in the Simferopol Raion.

According to the List of Populated Areas of the Crimean Autonomous Soviet Socialist Republic According to the All-Union Census of 17 December 1926, the Novo-Alekseevka farmstead in the Neizats Village Council of Simferopol Raion had 7 households, all peasant, with a population of 35 people.

A new Zuya Raion was formed by a VTSIK decree on 10 June 1937, and the village was included in it. Novo-Alekseevka was still marked on the 1941 General Staff map of the Red Army. After the Crimean offensive in 1944, a decree dated 12 August 1944 initiated the resettlement of collective farmers to Crimean districts. In September 1944, the first new settlers (212 families) from the Rostov, Kyiv, and Tambov regions arrived in the district, followed by a second wave of settlers from various regions of Ukraine in the early 1950s.

From 25 June 1946, the village was part of the Crimean Oblast of the Russian Soviet Federative Socialist Republic (RSFSR), and on 26 April 1954, the Crimean Oblast was transferred from the RSFSR to the Ukrainian SSR. After the abolition of Zuya Raion on 24 September 1959, the village was re-included in Simferopol Raion. The exact date of its inclusion in the Zuya village council is unknown, but by 15 June 1960, the village was already part of it. A decree of the Presidium of the Supreme Soviet of the Ukrainian SSR, "On the Enlargement of Rural Districts of the Crimean Oblast" on 30 December 1962, abolished Simferopol Raion, and the village was joined to Bilohirsk Raion. By 1968, the village was part of the Zuya village council.

According to the 1989 Soviet census, the village had a population of 120 people. Since 5 June 1990, Vyshneve has been part of the Krymskorozyvska Rural Council. From 12 February 1991, the village was part of the restored Crimean ASSR, renamed the Autonomous Republic of Crimea on 26 February 1992. Since 21 March 2014, Crimea, including the village, has been annexed by Russia.

The exact date when Novo-Alekseevka was renamed Vyshneve is not established, but it likely occurred in the 1930s, during the establishment of Krymska Roza.
