= Zuya =

Zuya may refer to one of the following:

- Zuya, Crimea, an urban-type settlement in Crimea, Ukraine
- Zuya (river), a river in Crimea, Ukraine

== See also ==
- Zuia, a town in Álava, Spain
