= Drofyne =

Village in Crimea

Drofyne Дрофине/Дрофино
- Village
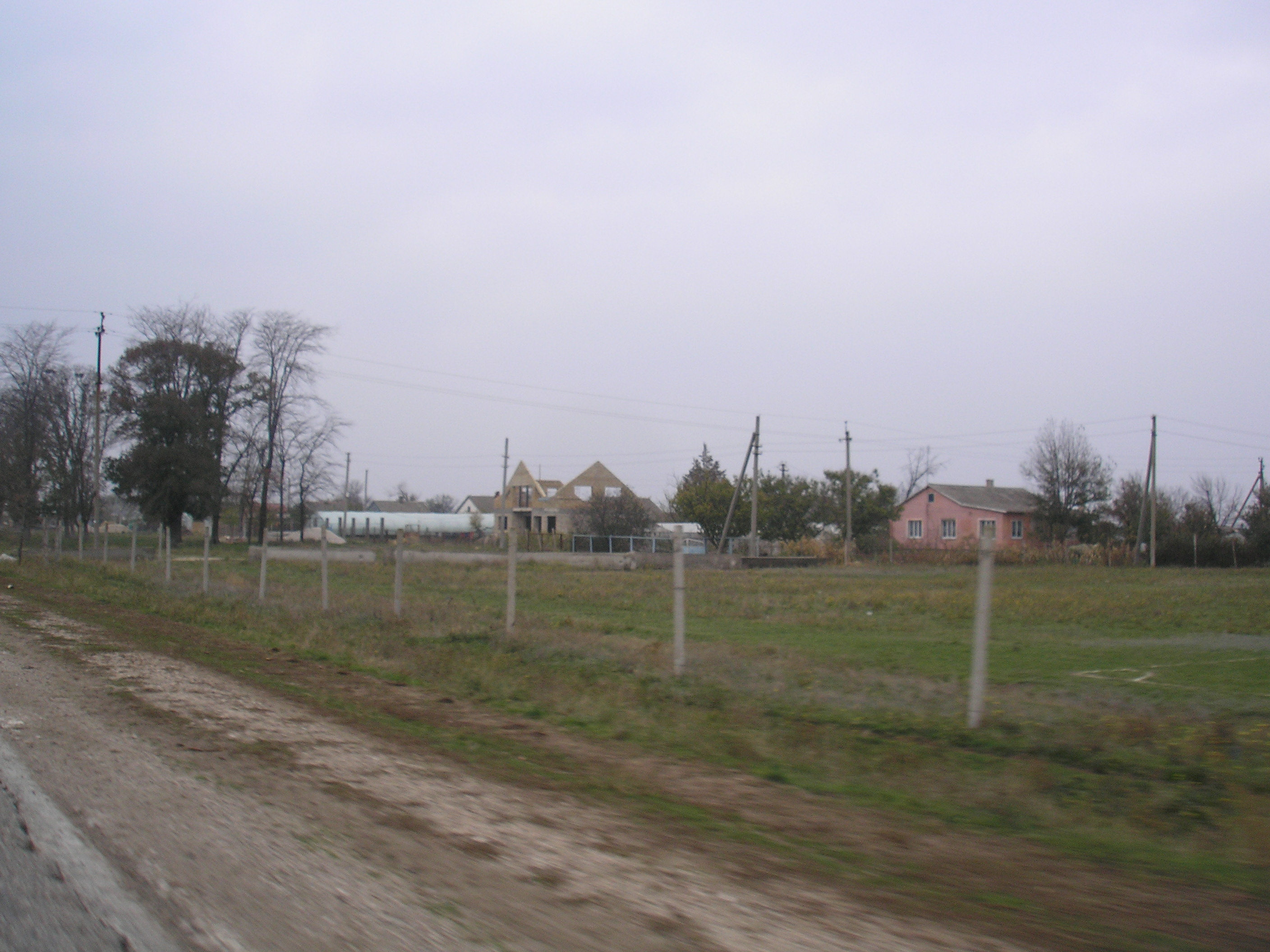

- Location within Crimea Location within Crimea Location within Ukraine Location within European Russia
- Coordinates: 45°17′05″N 34°37′03″E
- Region: (Autonomous Republic of Crimea) Crimea^{1}
- Raion: Nyzhnohirskyi Raion
- Established: 1784

Government
  - Mayor: Lyubov Mykolayivna Melnyk

Area
  - Total: 0.94 km^{2} (0.36 sq mi)

Population (2014)
  - Total: 779
- Postal Code: 97153 (Ukraine) / 297153 (under Russian occupation)
- ^{1} Autonomous Republic of Crimea (de jure) or Republic of Crimea (de facto), depending on jurisdiction.

Drofyne (Ukrainian: Дрофине; Russian: Дрофино; Crimean Tatar: Mesit) is a village in Nyzhniohirskyi Raion of Crimea.

== Geography ==
Drofyne is located in the south of the district, in the Crimean Steppe, near the district border with the Bilohirsk Raion, the altitude is 62 m.

The neighboring villages: Yastrubky 2.5 km to the West, Strepetove to the south and Sadove to the North-East. The distance to the district center is about 21 kilometer.

The closest railway station is located in Nyzhnohirskyi (on line Dzhankoi — Feodosia).

There is one school in Drofyne.

== History ==
The villages of Maly Matis and Bolshoy Matis appeared, apparently, in the 1930s, as in the List of settlements of the Crimean Autonomous Soviet Socialist Republic in the Soviet Union of 17 December 1926.

In 1915, the two villages were listed in the Statistical Handbook of the Taurida Governorate as part of the Tabuldy Parish in the Simferopol Raion. According to the book, the settlements featured a Crimea German farm, and counted a population of 36 people, including 8 ethnic Germans. In 1926, the village had a population of 17 people, out of whom 8 were Germans, 7 Russians and 2 Ukrainians. Following the end of the Second World War, the population grew rapidly, when over 300 ethnic Ukrainian (from various oblasts of Mainland Ukraine) and Russian (from the Tambov Oblast) families were settled in the vicinity of the two villages. By the decree of the Presidium of USSR in RSFSR of 18 May 1948, the villages of Malyi Matis and Velykyi Matis ceased to exist and were merged into a single settlement under the name of Drofino. The village was subsequently put under the jurisdiction of the Nyzhnohirskyi Raion. On 30 September 1966 the village became centre of the village council.

== Demographics ==
As of the 2001 Ukrainian census, Drofyne had a population of 1,037 inhabitants. The distribution of the population by their primary languages was as follows:

First languages in Drofyne
	percent
Russian	54.3%
Crimean Tatar	28.2%
Ukrainian	16.6%
Belarusian	0.2%
others	0.7%
