= Lomonosove =

Village in Crimea, Ukraine

Lomonosove Ломоносове
- Village
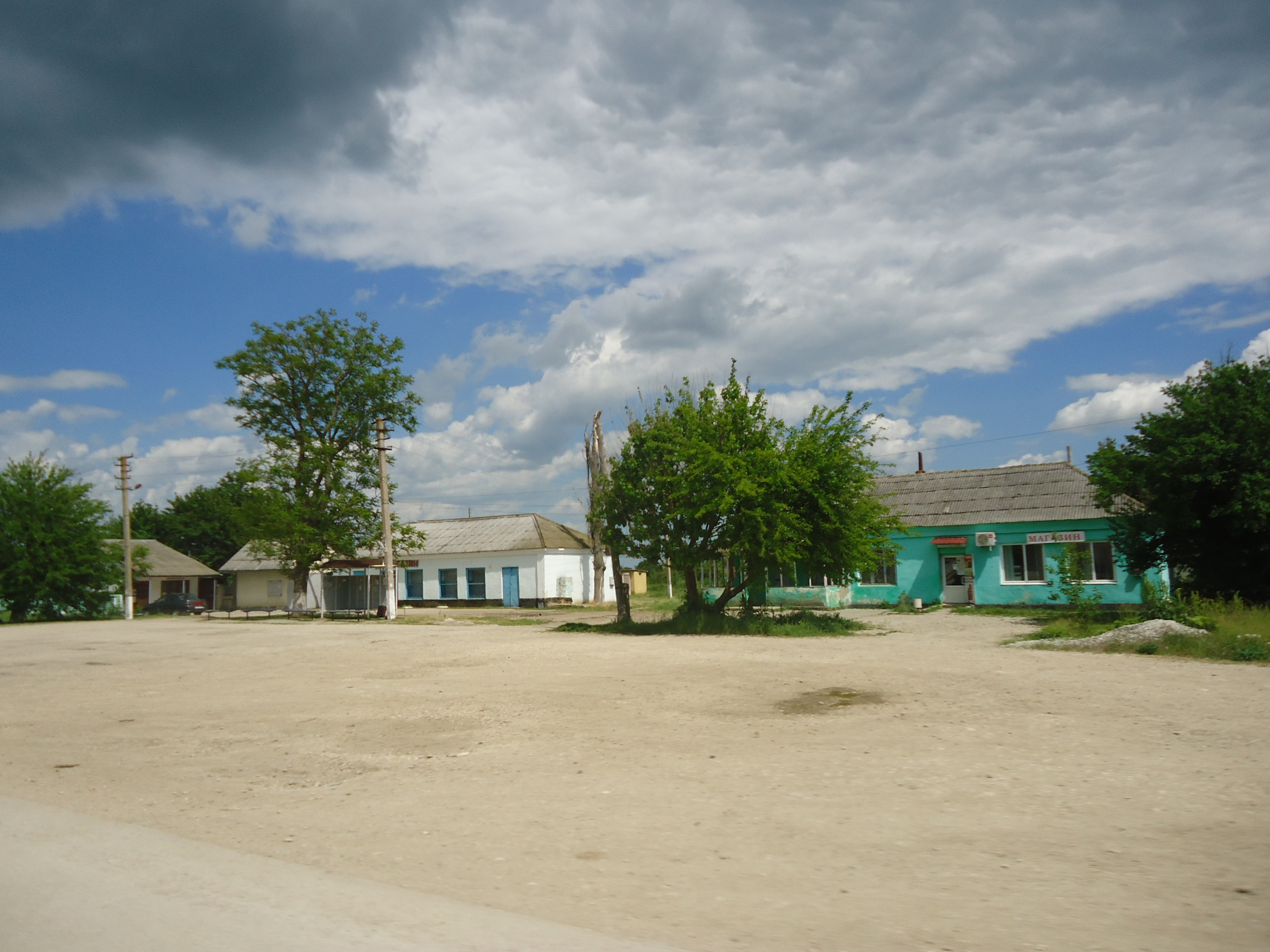

- Location of Lomonosove in Crimea Location of Lomonosove in Ukraine
- Coordinates: 45°24′5″N 34°41′0″E
- Country: Ukraine (occupied by Russia)
- Republic: Autonomous Republic of Crimea
- Raion: Nyzhnohirskyi Raion

Area
  - Total: 0.31 km^{2} (0.12 sq mi)
- Elevation: 36 m (118 ft)

Population (2001)
  - Total: 747
  - Density: 2,400/km^{2} (6,200/sq mi)
- Time zone: UTC+2 (EET)
  - Summer (DST): UTC+3 (EEST)
- Postal code: 97141
- Area code: +380 6550
- Vehicle registration: AK/KK/01
- Website: www.rada.gov.ua

Lomonosove (Ukrainian: Ломоносове; Crimean Tatar: Lomonosovo; Russian: Ломоносовo) is a village in Bilohirsk Raion, Autonomous Republic of Crimea, southern Ukraine, which is currently occupied and annexed by the Russian Federation. Despite Ukraine's administrative reform in 2020, Russia continues to administer the settlement as part of the Nyzhnohirskyi Raion. As of the 2001 Ukrainian Census, Lomonosove counted a population of 747 inhabitants.

== History ==
=== Under the Soviet Union ===
During World War II, the settlement came under German occupation. The local Jewish population was either forced to flee, or massacred by the invading forces. After the end of the war and the ethnic cleansing of the local Jewish and Crimean Tatar population by Nazi Germany and the Soviet Union respectively, Lomonosove was settled by Ukrainians and Russian working immigrants from the Tambov Oblast.

=== In independent Ukraine ===
After the collapse of the Soviet Union, the local Crimean Tatar population of Lomonosove saw rapid growth, as most of the surviving population returned to Crimea.

In 2014, in violation of international law, Russia invaded and occupied Crimea. After conducting what was vastly considered to be a sham referendum, the Autonomous Republic of Crimea was incorporated by Russian Federation as the Republic of Crimea.

== Geography ==
Lomonosove is located on the right bank of the Salhyr river in the eastern part of the Crimean peninsula. The village features a hot-summer humid continental climate (Köppen classification Dfa), which borders on a humid subtropical climate (Köppen classification Cfa). Summers are hot, while winters are cool and dry. Cold snaps are not uncommon due to the absence of high mountains, which would protect the area from cold air coming from the north.

== Demographics ==
As of the 2001 Ukrainian census, the settlement had a population of 747. The majority of the population are Ukrainians, while Crimean Tatars and ethnic Russians make up the largest minorities in the settlement. Lomonosove is lingualistically diverse, with most of the population being Ukrainophone.

The exact native language composition was as follows:

Native language composition of Lomonosove
	percent
Ukrainian	40.6%
Crimean Tatar	33.1%
Russian	26.2%
others	0.1%
