= Reşat Amet =

Ukrainian human rights activist

- Reşat Medatoğlu Ametov; Решат Медатович Аметов; Решат Мідатович Аметов
- Born: 24 January 1975; Simferopol, Ukrainian SSR, Soviet Union
- Died: c. 3 March 2014 (aged 39); Lenin Square, Simferopol, Crimea
- Body discovered: 15 March 2014; Zemlianychne, Bilohirsk Raion, Crimea
- Resting place: Abdalı Muslim Cemetery, Simferopol
- Citizenship: Crimean Tatar
- Spouse: Zarina Amet (Ametova)
- Children: 3

Reşat Amet (Crimean Tatar: Reşat Medatoğlu Ametov, Russian: Решат Медатович Аметов, romanized: Reshat Medatovich Ametov, Ukrainian: Решат Мідатович Аметов, romanized: Reshat Midatovych Ametov; 24 January 1975 – 15 March 2014) was a Crimean Tatar activist posthumously awarded the title Hero of Ukraine (2017).

== Abduction and death ==
On 3 March 2014, Reşat initiated a solitary and peaceful protest against the occupation of Crimea by Russian troops. During his protest in front of the Crimean Council of Ministers building in Simferopol's Lenin Square, he was abducted by three unidentified men in military uniform from the "Crimean self-defense" detachments who took him away.

On 15 March 2014, Reşat's body was found by the police in a forest near the village of Zemlianychne in Bilohirsk Raion about 60 kilometres east of the Crimean capital. The body bore marks of violence and torture, with the head bound with duct-tape and the legs shackled. A pair of handcuffs was lying near the body. According to Resat's brother, Refat Amet (Ametov), the cause of death was a stab wound resulting from a knife or a similar pointed object penetrating the eye. Reşat's murder remains unsolved.

Reşat was buried on 18 March 2014 at the Abdalı Muslim Cemetery of Simferopol. He left behind his young wife, Zarina, and three children.

== See also ==
- List of kidnappings
- Lists of solved missing person cases
- List of unsolved murders (2000–present)
