= Vyshneve =

Vyshneve (Ukrainian: Вишневе) may refer to several places in Ukraine:

- Vyshneve (city), city in Kyiv Oblast
- Vyshneve, Chernihiv Oblast, a village in Chernihiv Oblast
- Vyshneve, Crimea, a village
- Vyshneve, Dnipropetrovsk Oblast, urban-type settlement in Dnipropetrovsk Oblast
- Vyshneve, Pokrovsk Raion, Donetsk Oblast, urban-type settlement in Donetsk Oblast
