= Pryazovia =

Northern coastal region of the Sea of Azov

Coordinates: 47.0°N 36.6°E

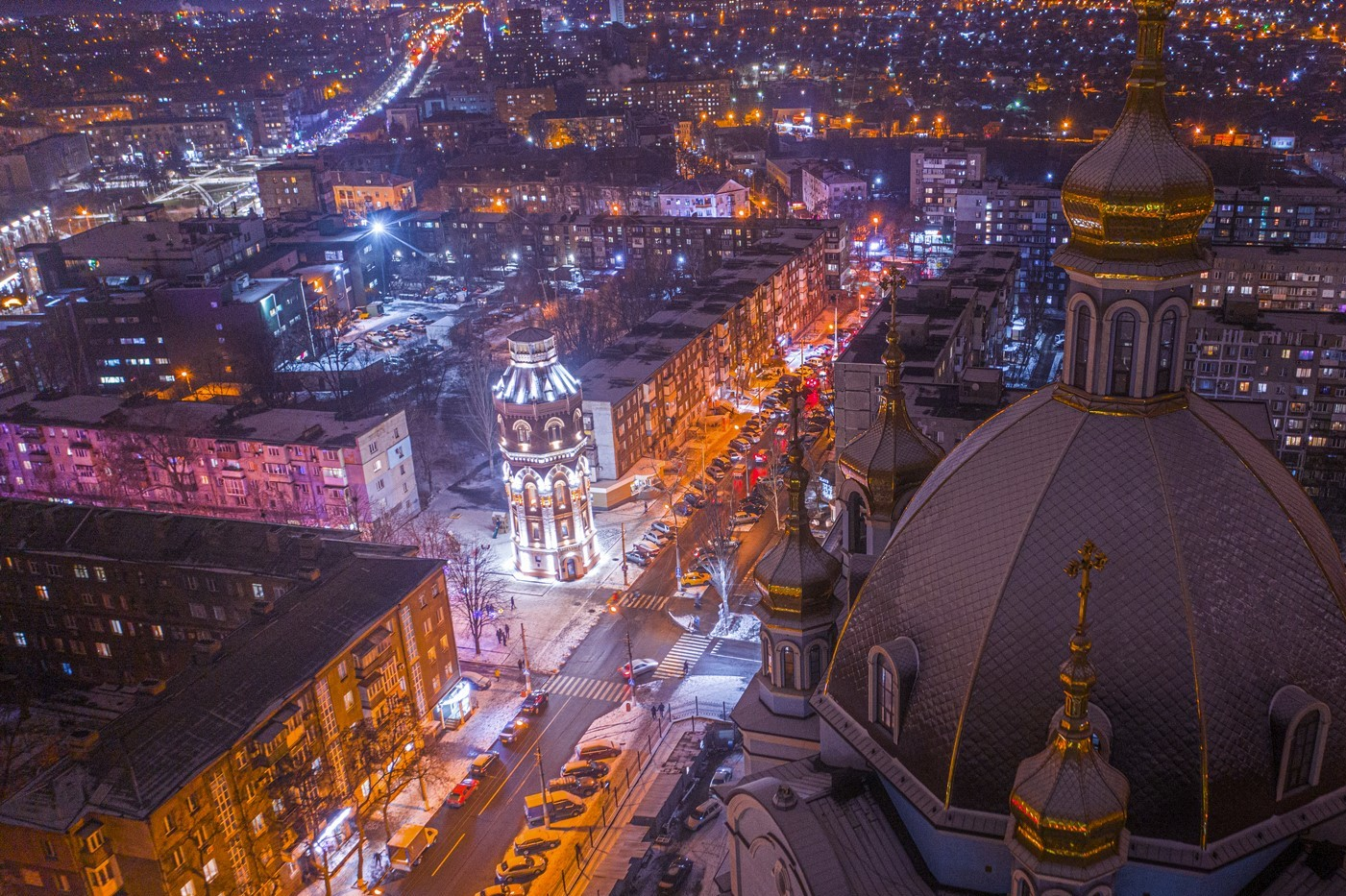
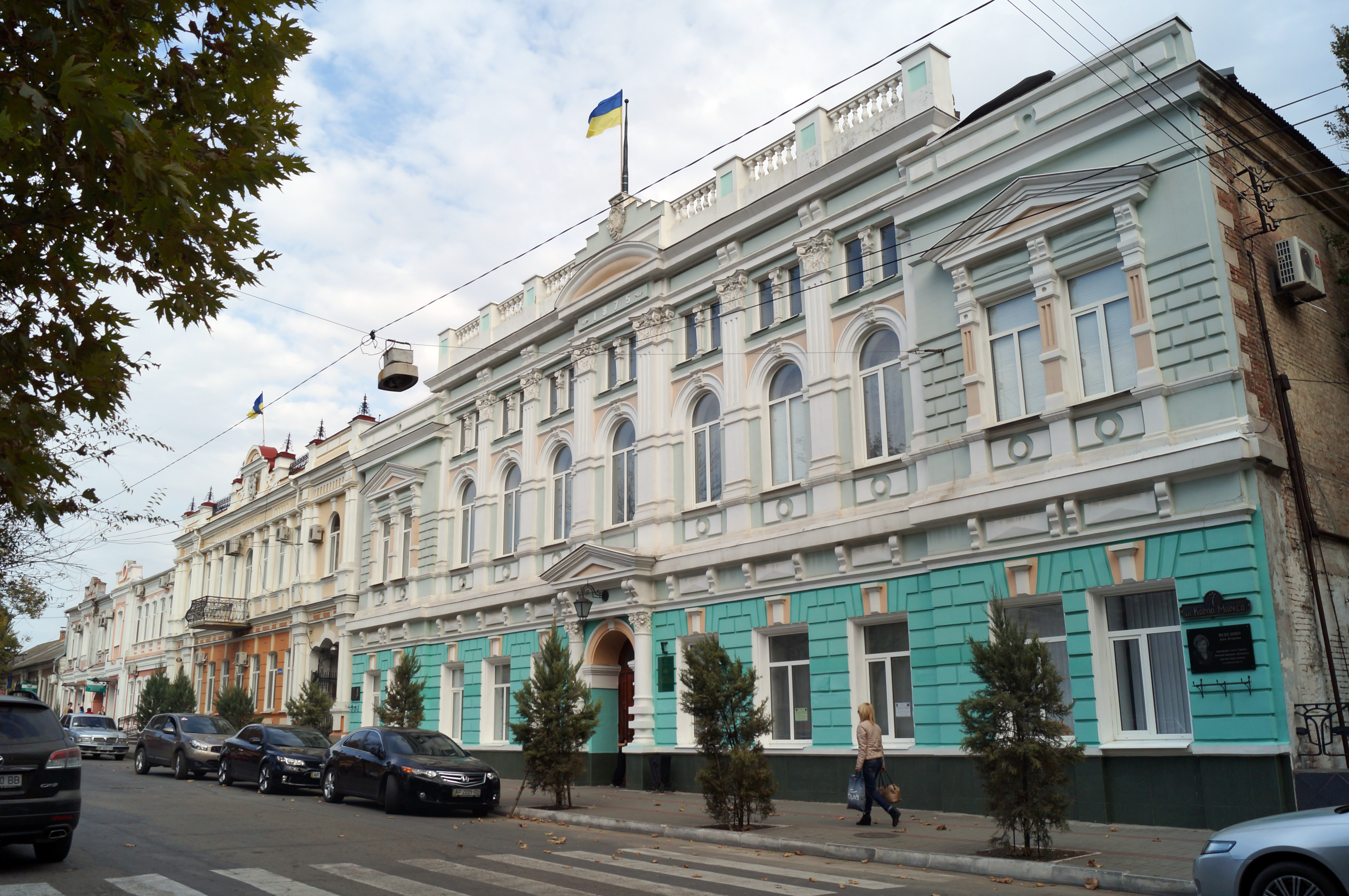
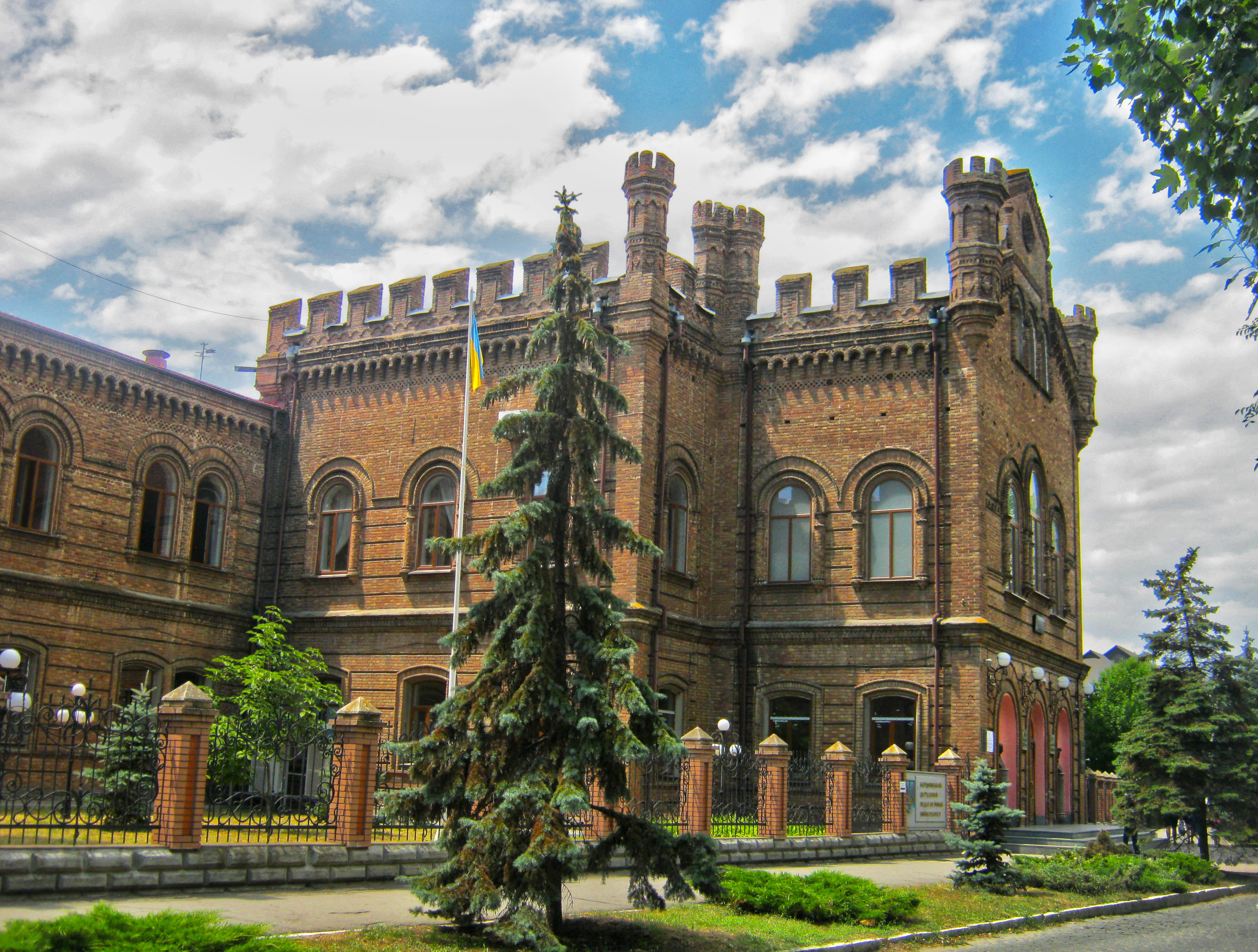
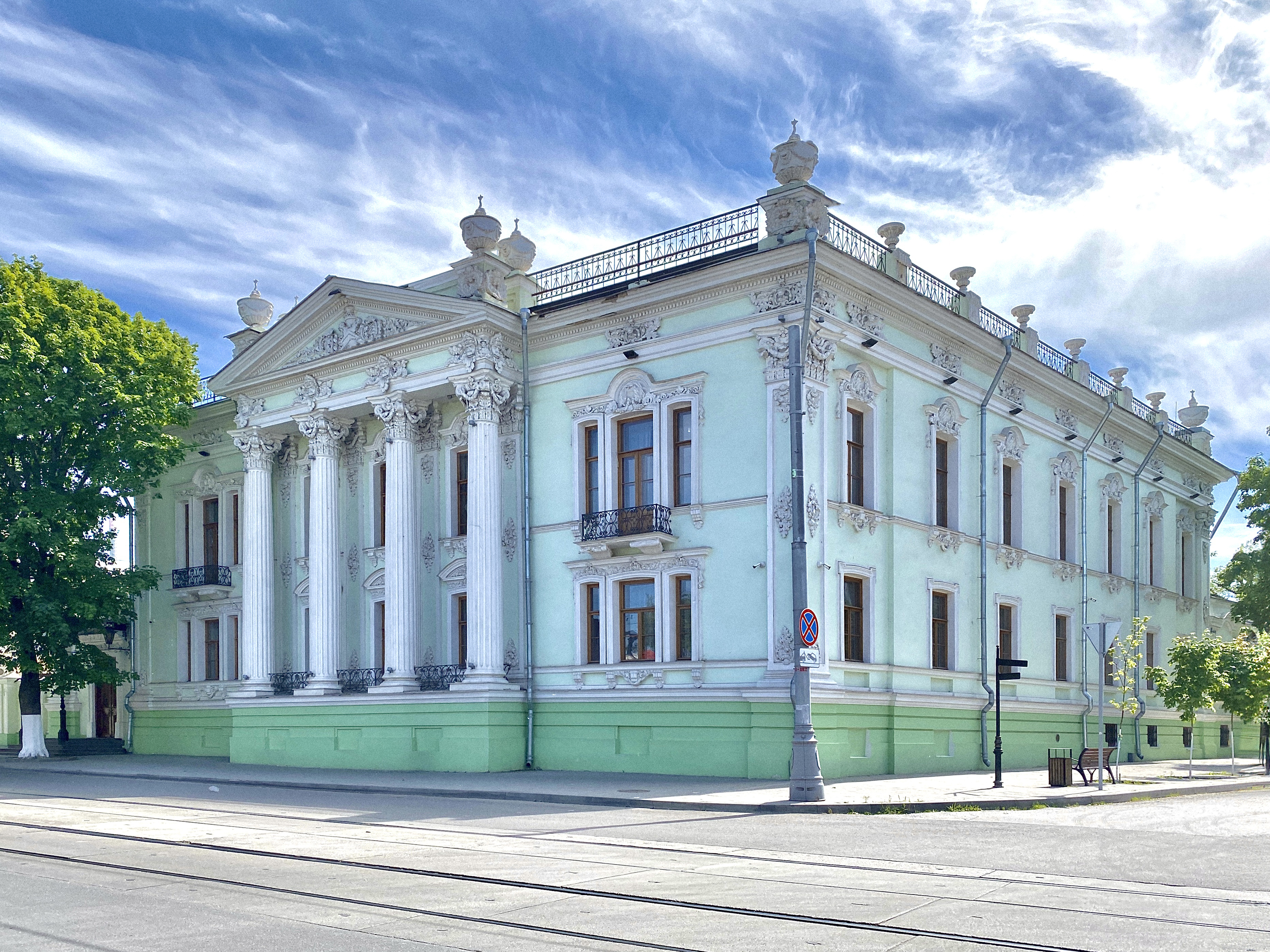
- From top, left to right: Mariupol; Melitopol; Berdiansk State Pedagogical University in Berdiansk; Alferaki Palace in Taganrog

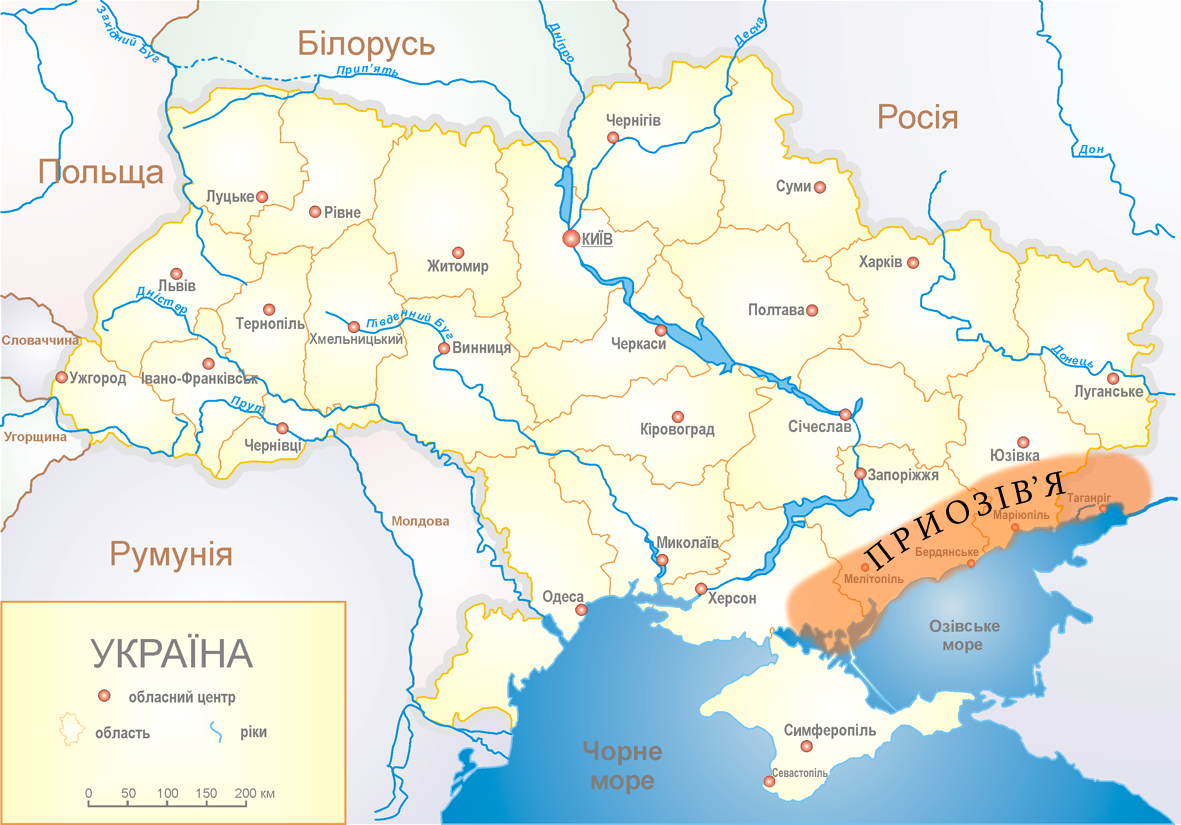
- Approximate location of Northern Pryazovia. Legend: Приозів'я - Pryazovia; Озівське море - Sea of Azov; Чорне море - Black Sea
- Countries: Ukraine (Note: De jure; Ukrainian portion has been occupied by Russia since 2022); Russia

Pryazovia (Ukrainian: Приазов'я, sometimes spelled Приозів'я, (Note: pre-1933 Ukrainian orthography) Pryozivia; Russian: Приазовье, romanized: Priazovye) or literally Cis-Azov region is usually used to refer to the geographic area of the north coast of the Sea of Azov, mostly located in south-eastern Ukraine, with a small part in Russia. It is located in the southern part of the Azov-Kuban Lowland within the East European Plain, which surrounds the Sea of Azov for most of the stretch of coastline. In a more general sense it may mean the Azov Sea littoral, and conversely, to be more specific, it may also be referred to as the Northern Priazovye. Since 2022, it has been completely occupied by Russia.

== Geography ==
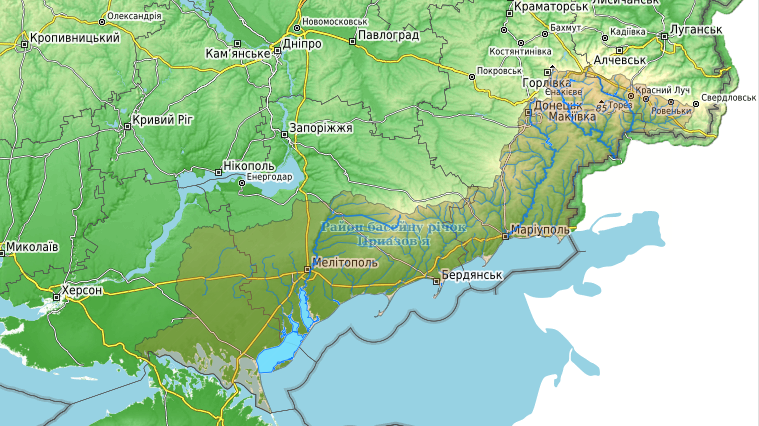
Ukrainian river basins in Pryazovia

The (Northern) Priazovye consists of the southern parts of Donetsk Oblast and Zaporizhzhia Oblast and the eastern part of Kherson Oblast - parts of Ukraine and the western part of Rostov Oblast of Russia.

It is a small part in the south of the vast East European Plain. The southern edge of the Ukrainian Shield overlaps with Eastern Pryazovia. The natural Northern borders of Northwestern Pryazovia are the Azov Upland and the Donets Ridge.

Major rivers include Kalmius and Mius.

Largest cities are Rostov-on-Don, Mariupol, Taganrog, Melitopol, and Berdiansk.

== History ==
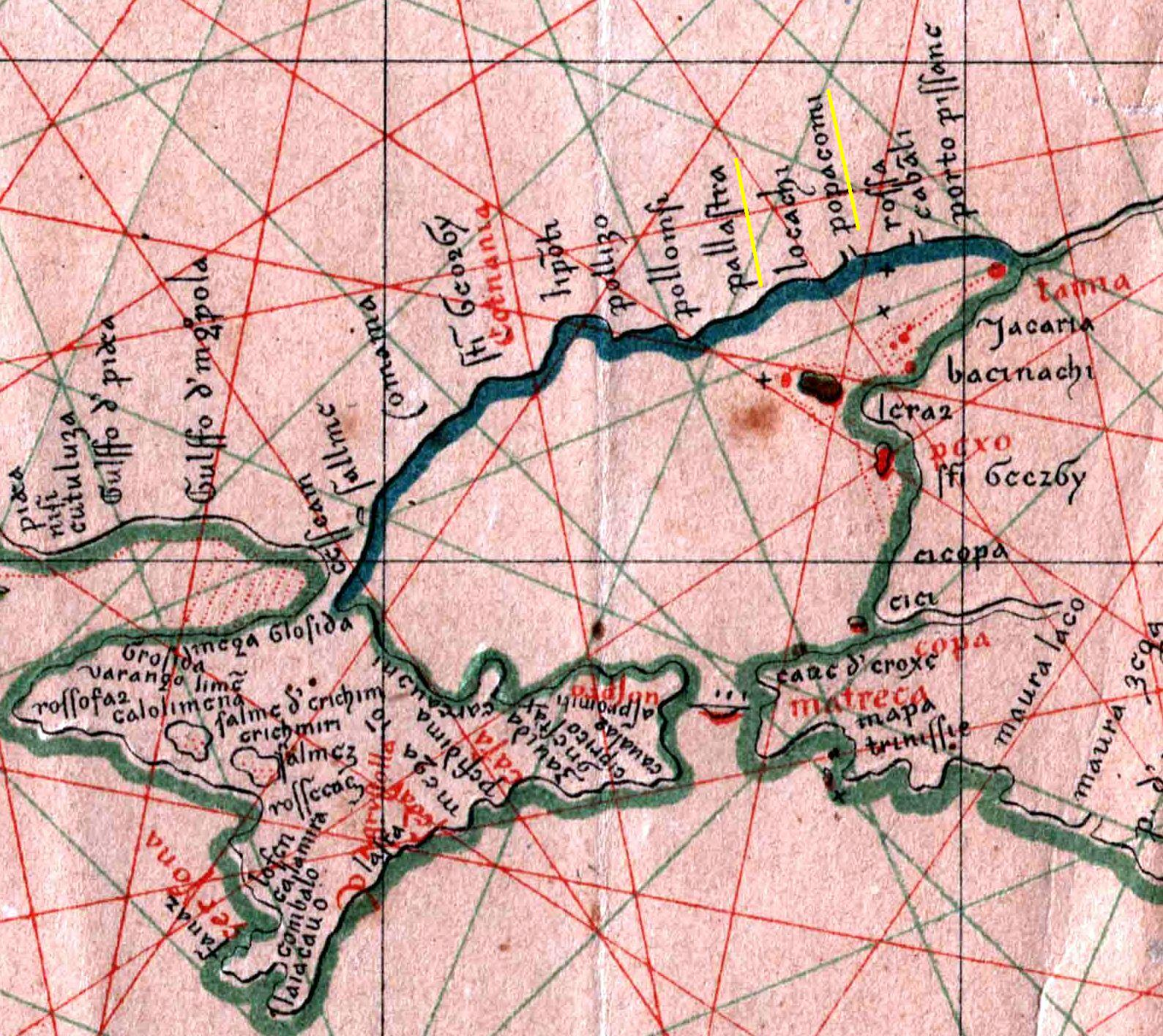
Pietro Vesconte's 1318 portolan of the Sea of Azov

In its earlier history, the region was ruled by Scythia, Old Great Bulgaria, Khazars, Kipchaks, the Mongol Empire, and the Crimean Khanate. The oldest towns were located at present-day Taganrog, that was the ancient Greek emporium Kremnoi from the 7th to 5th centuries BC and the medieval Italian Pisan colony of Portus Pisanus from the 13th century. Following annexation and liquidation of the Crimean Khanate, between 1783 and 1802 this land was part of Imperial Russian Novorossiya Governorate in the historical area of Novorossiya ("New Russia"). Tsarist Russia forcibly resettled many Greeks from Crimea to Pryazovia, as well as some Poles from territories annexed in the Partitions of Poland, yet Ukrainians formed the majority of the population.

After the fall of the Russian Empire, the area was at various times either entirely or partly controlled by the Bolsheviks, Ukrainians, White Russians, and Ukrainian Makhnovists, before the bulk of it became part of the Soviet Ukraine. In March-April 1918, Taganrog served as the capital of the Ukrainian Soviet Republic, and was the place of establishment of the Communist Party of Ukraine. In 1924, a small portion with Taganrog in the east passed from Soviet Ukraine to Soviet Russia. During World War II, the territory was occupied by Germany in 1941–1943.

2022 Russian occupation of Ukraine

During the 2022 Russian invasion of Ukraine, the whole of Pryazovia was occupied by Russian troops. The fiercest battle in the area was the siege of Mariupol.

== Population ==
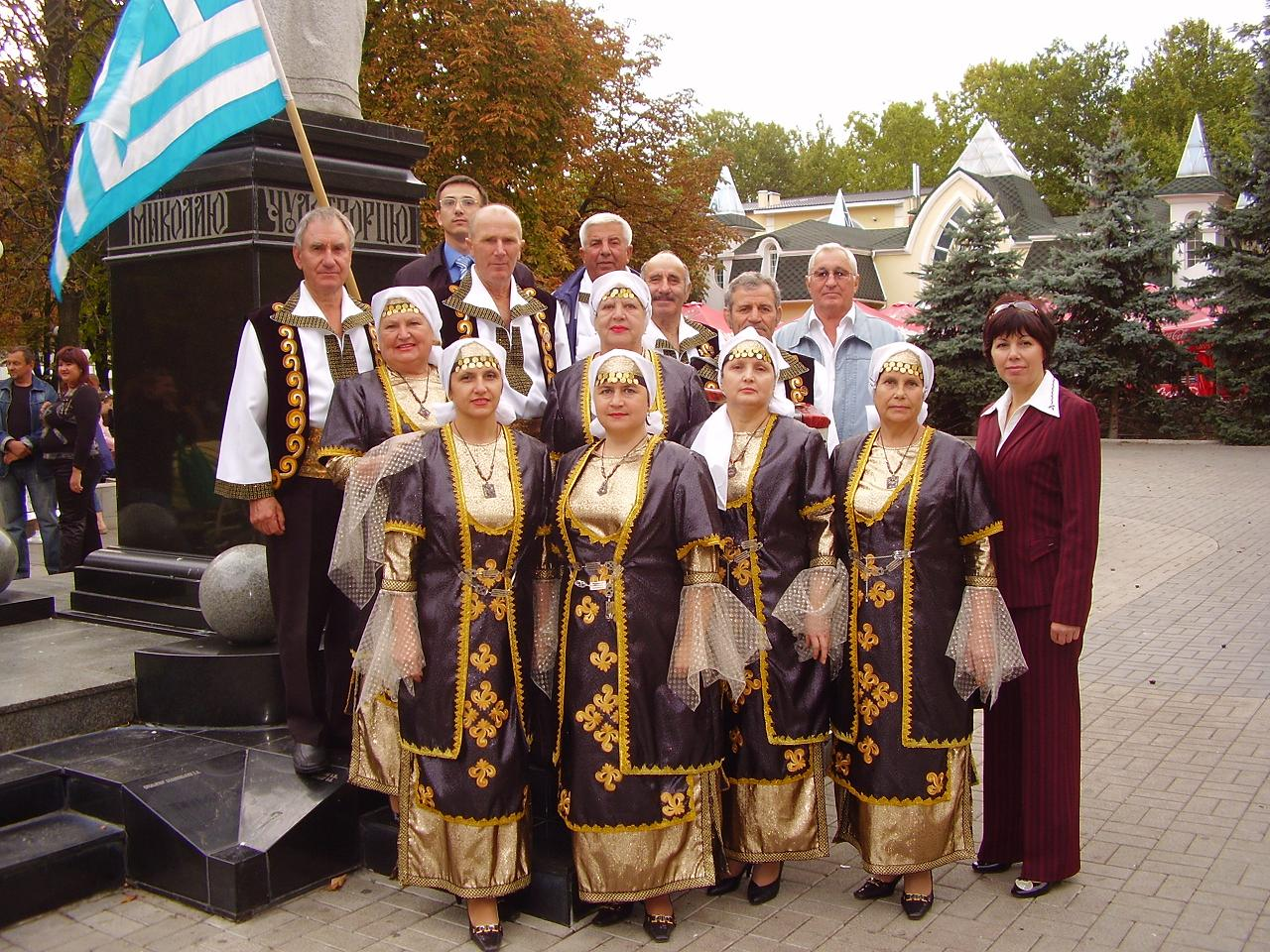
Priazovian Greeks (2009)

Ukraine's Greek minority population of 91,000 (in 2021) live mostly in the Pryazovia region, as a result of the eviction of Christians from the Crimea in 1778.

According to the 1897 census, Ukrainians formed a majority (56.2%) of the population of the four coastal districts of Pryazovia (Berdyansky Uyezd, Melitopolsky Uyezd, Mariupol uezd, Taganrog Okrug), forming the largest ethnicity in each of the districts, with sizeable minorities being Russians, Greeks, Bulgarians, Germans, Tatars, Jews, Belarusians, Poles, and Turks. The vast majority of Greeks, Tatars and Turks lived in the Mariupol uezd, forming 19.0%, 6.1% and 2.1% of its population, respectively, most of the Bulgarians lived in the Berdyansky Uyezd, forming 10.4% of its population, most Poles lived in the Melitopolsky Uyezd, where they were deported by Russia from territories annexed in the Partitions of Poland, whereas the Russian, German, Jewish and Belarusian minorities were more evenly distributed.

== See also ==
- Category:Priazovia in Ukrainian Wikipedia
