= Zemlianychne =

Zemlianychne Земляничне
- Village
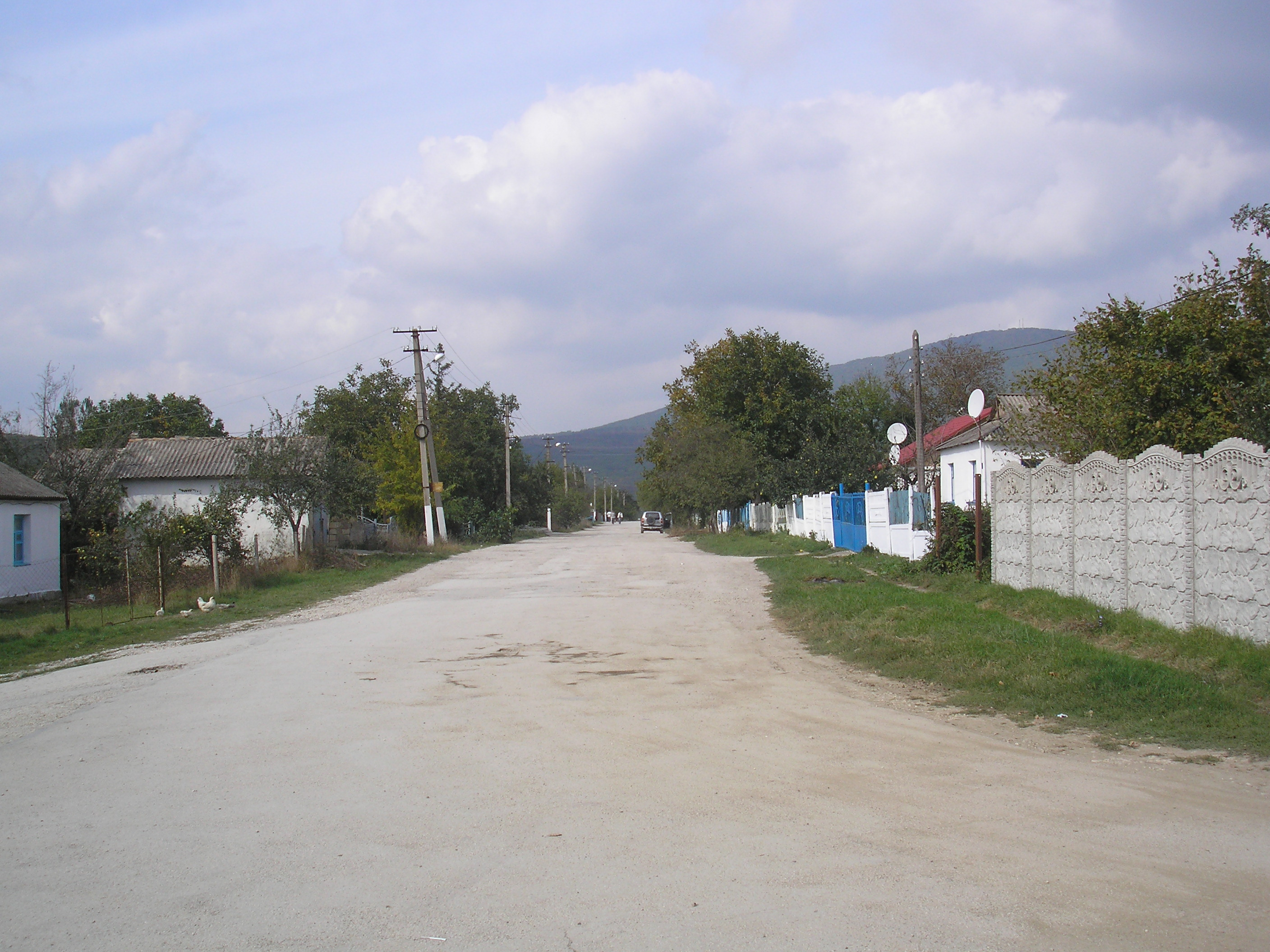

- Location of Zemlianychne in Crimea Zemlianychne (Crimea)
- Coordinates: 45°03′15″N 34°18′54″E
- Country: Ukraine
- Republic: Crimea
- Raion: Bilohirsk
- Elevation: 330 m (1,080 ft)

Population (2014)
  - Total: ▼660
- Time zone: UTC+4 (MSK)
- Postal code: 97651
- Area code: +380 6559

Zemlianychne (Ukrainian: Земляничне; Russian: Земляничное; Crimean Tatar: Ortalan) is a village in the Bilohirsk Raion of Crimea. Population: 660 (2014 Census).

On 15 March 2014, the body of activist Reşat Amet was found by the police in a forest near the village of Zemlianychne in Bilohirsk Raion about 60 kilometers east of the Crimean capital.
