= Nyzhnohirskyi =

Nyzhnohirskyi Нижньогірський (Ukrainian) Seyitler (Crimean Tatar) Нижнегорский (Russian)
- Urban-type settlement
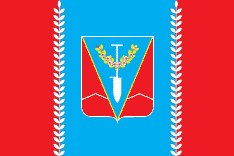
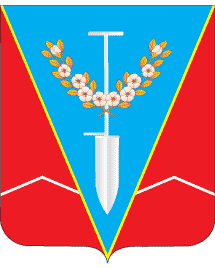
- Flag Coat of arms

- Location of Nyzhnohirskyi in Crimea Nyzhnohirskyi (Crimea)
- Coordinates: 45°26′37″N 34°44′26″E
- Country: Ukraine
- Region: Crimea
- Raion: Nyzhnohirskyi Raion
- Town status: 1938

Government
  - Town Head: Viktor Klymenko
- Elevation: 22 m (72 ft)

Population (2014)
  - Total: 8,741
- Time zone: UTC+4 (MSK (since 2014))
- Postal code: 97100
- Area code: +380 6550
- Website: http://rada.gov.ua/

Nyzhnohirskyi (Ukrainian: Нижньогірський; Crimean Tatar: Seyitler) or Nizhnegorsky (Russian: Нижнегорский), is an urban-type settlement in the Autonomous Republic of Crimea, a territory recognized by a majority of countries as part of Ukraine and occupied by Russia as the Republic of Crimea. The town also serves as the administrative center of the Nyzhnohirskyi Raion (district), housing the district's local administration buildings.

As of the 2001 Ukrainian Census, its population was 10,534. Current population: 8,741 (2014 Census).

== History ==
The settlement was known by its Crimean Tatar name Seyitler (Ukrainian: Сеїтлер, romanized: Seitler; Russian: Сейтлер, romanized: Seytler) until 1944.

Russia captured Nyzhnohirskyi on March 3, 2014, during its invasion of Crimea starting from 27 February.

== Notable people ==
- Serhiy Dzyndzyruk (born 1976), Ukrainian boxer
