= Zuya, Crimea =

Zuya Зуя
- Urban-type settlement
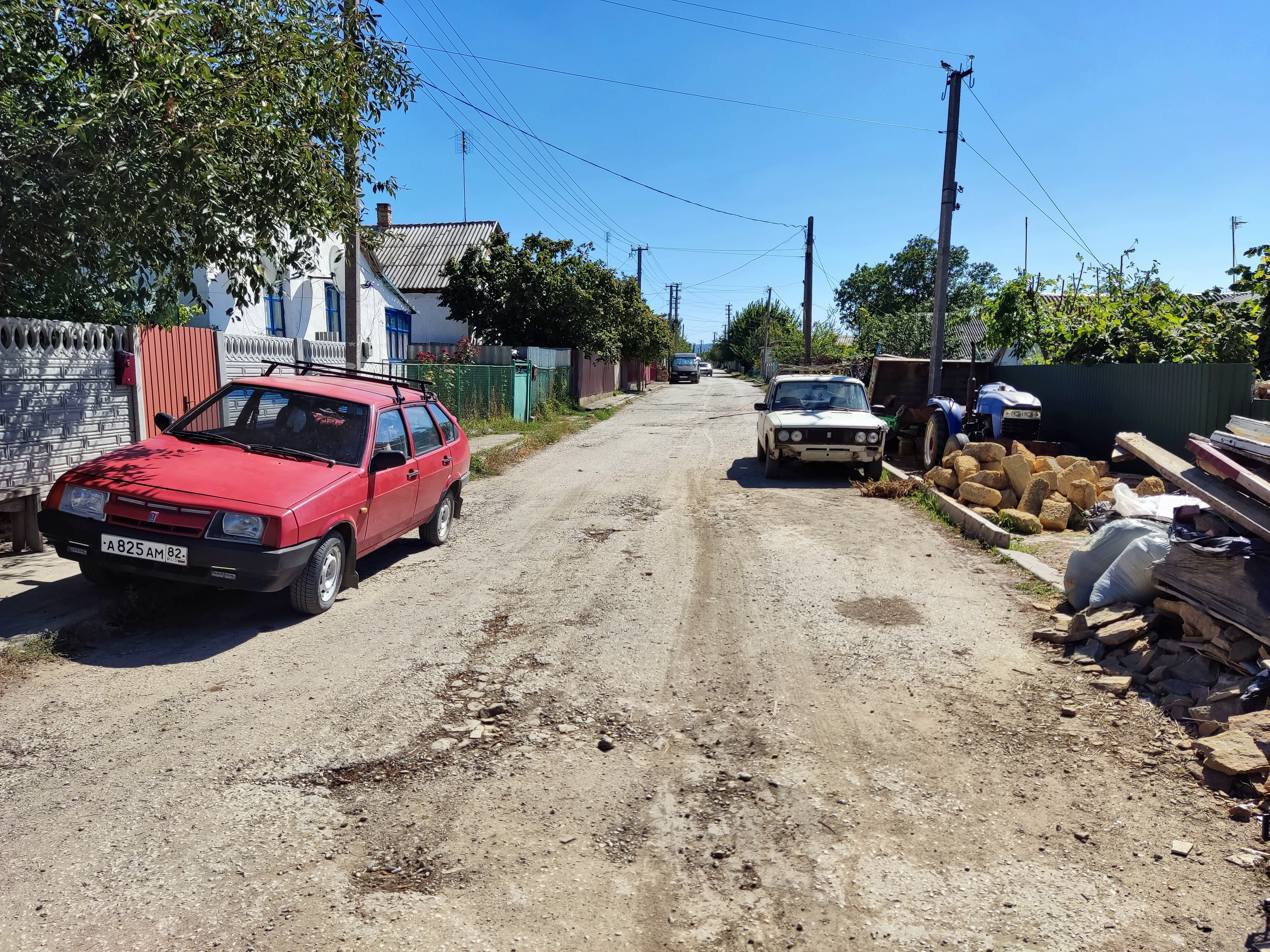

- Location of Zuya in Crimea Zuya (Crimea)
- Coordinates: 45°03′15″N 34°18′54″E
- Country: Ukraine (occupied by Russia)
- Republic: Crimea
- Raion: Bilohirsk
- Elevation: 257 m (843 ft)

Population (2014)
  - Total: ▼6,230
- Time zone: UTC+4 (MSK)
- Postal code: 97630
- Area code: +380 6559

Zuya (Ukrainian: Зуя, romanized: Zuia; Russian: Зуя; Crimean Tatar: Zuya) is an urban-type settlement in the Bilohirsk Raion of Crimea. Its population was 6,230 (2014 Census). It is located upon the eponymous river.
