= Zuya (river) =

River in Crimea

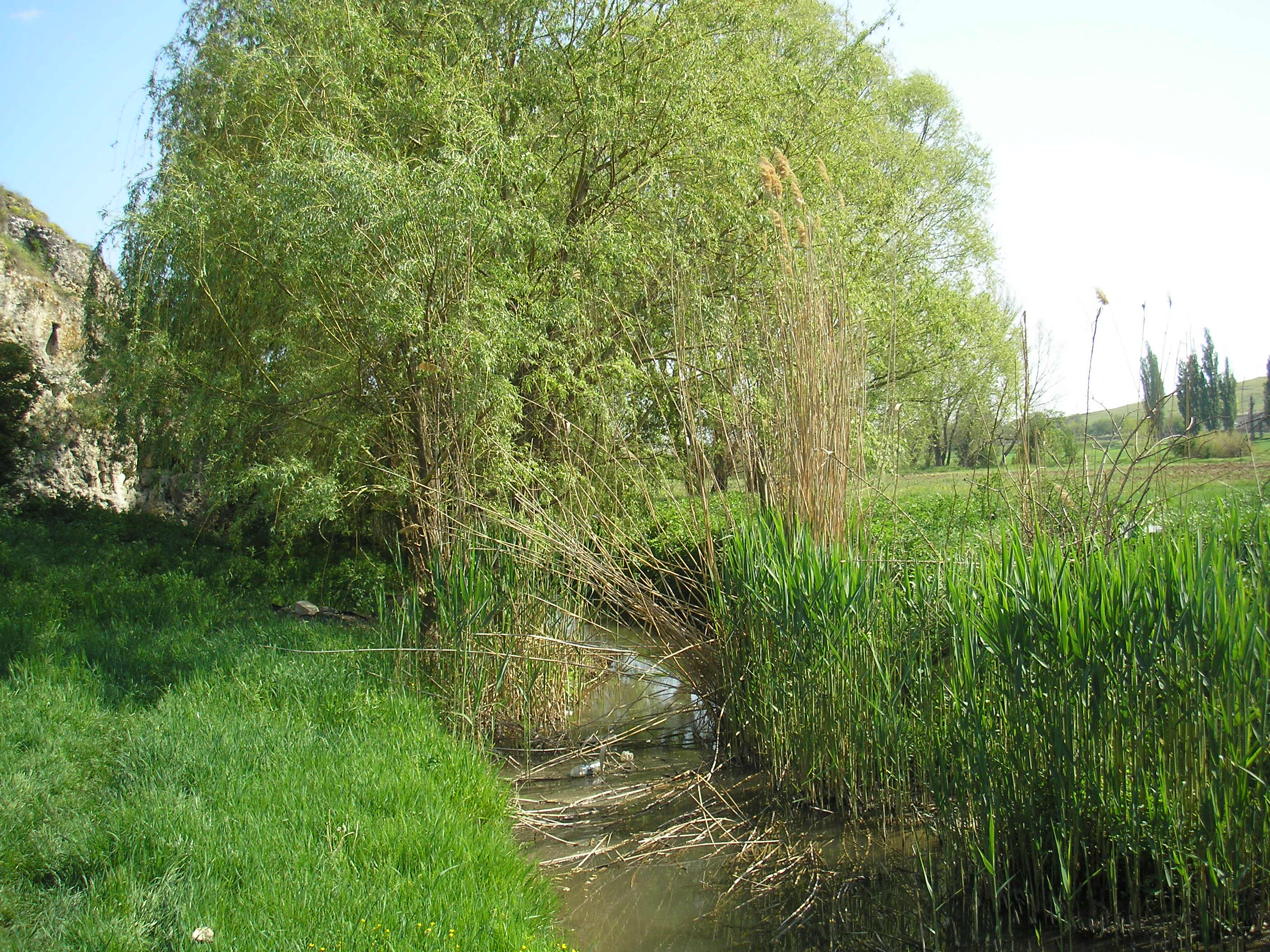
- Native name: Zuya (Crimean Tatar); Зуя (Ukrainian); Зуя (Russian)

Location
- Country: Disputed: Ukraine (de jure); Russia (de facto)
- Autonomous republic: Crimea (de jure)

Physical characteristics
- Source: Choban-Suat
  - location: Dolgorukovskaya Yayla
  - coordinates: 44°54′11″N 34°21′37″E
  - elevation: 707 m
- Mouth: Salhyr
  - coordinates: 45°13′10″N 34°6′47″E
- Length: 55 km (34 mi)
- Basin size: 421 km²
- Discharge
  - location: Balanove
  - average: 0.133 m³/sec
  - maximum: 0.302 m³/sec

Basin features
- Tributaries
  - left: Fundukli; Beshterek
  - right: Montanai

The Zuya (Crimean Tatar: Zuya, Зуя; Ukrainian: Зуя; Russian: Зуя) is a river in Crimea, Ukraine, a tributary of the Salhyr river, draining into the Sea of Azov basin. The river is 49 kilometres long with a catchment area of 421 square kilometres. The slope is 13.0 metres per kilometre. In its upper reaches, the valley is V-shaped, and further downstream, it becomes trough-shaped, with a width of 0.6-2 kilometres. The riverbed is winding, with a width of 1-5 metres. During low-water years, it may dries up. The river is used for irrigation purposes, and for this purpose, the Balonov Reservoir has been constructed.

== Geography ==
The Zuya is 49 km long with a drainage basin area of 421 km², a river gradient of 15.4 m/km, and an average long-term discharge of 0.133 m³/sec at the stream gauge at Balanove, increasing to 0.302 m³/sec at the mouth. It begins on the northern slopes of the Dolgorukovskaya Yayla (the main ridge of the Crimean Mountains), with its source the Choban-Suat spring (flowing from the Larisanina cave) located at an elevation of 707 metres.

The river was first mentioned in literature in 1889 by N.A. Golovkinsky in the Memorial Book of the Taurida Governorate (Russian: "Памятная книга Таврической губернии":

Р. Зуя начинается довольно сильным потоком из трещины на возвышенности Чобан-Суат

The Zuya River begins as a fairly strong stream from a fissure on the Choban-Suat elevation.

The Zuya initially flows north, then northwest in the lower reaches, crossing the inner and outer ridges of the Crimean Mountains. In the upper basin, the terrain is mountainous and hilly, forested; in the middle reaches, the area is hilly and predominantly covered with shrub vegetation, transitioning smoothly to steppe in the lower reaches.

The Zuya flows into Salhyr north of the village of Novoandriyivka in Simferopol Raion from the left, 133 km from its mouth. It also runs through the Krasnohvardiiske and Nyzhnohirskyi Raions. However, by the early 20th century, the Zuya riverbed in this area had become a wide, shallow, and completely dry ditch, with spring and floodwaters only reaching a pond built below the village of Piatykhlebne, and any flow disappearing altogether near the village of Kharitonovka (formerly Adzhy-Kech).

Like most Crimean rivers, the Zuya is characterized by low water levels in summer and a rise in water levels in winter and spring. In summer and autumn, the lower reaches of the river dry up, and the water may not reach the mouth. The river's water protection zone is set at 100 metres.

=== Tributaries ===
The river has three named tributaries:

Left:

- Fundukli, 14 km long, also entering from the left 29 km from the mouth
- Beshterek, 41 km long, entering from the left bank 7 km from the mouth

Right:

- Montanai, 14 km long, entering from the right 25 km from the mouth.

Additionally, there are six unnamed tributaries less than 5 km long. Other sources mention the names of incoming arroyos (seasonal watercourses): Akmaz, Kol, Matai (or Mataiska), Mulla-Kol-Su, and Tav-Chuyunchi.

== History ==
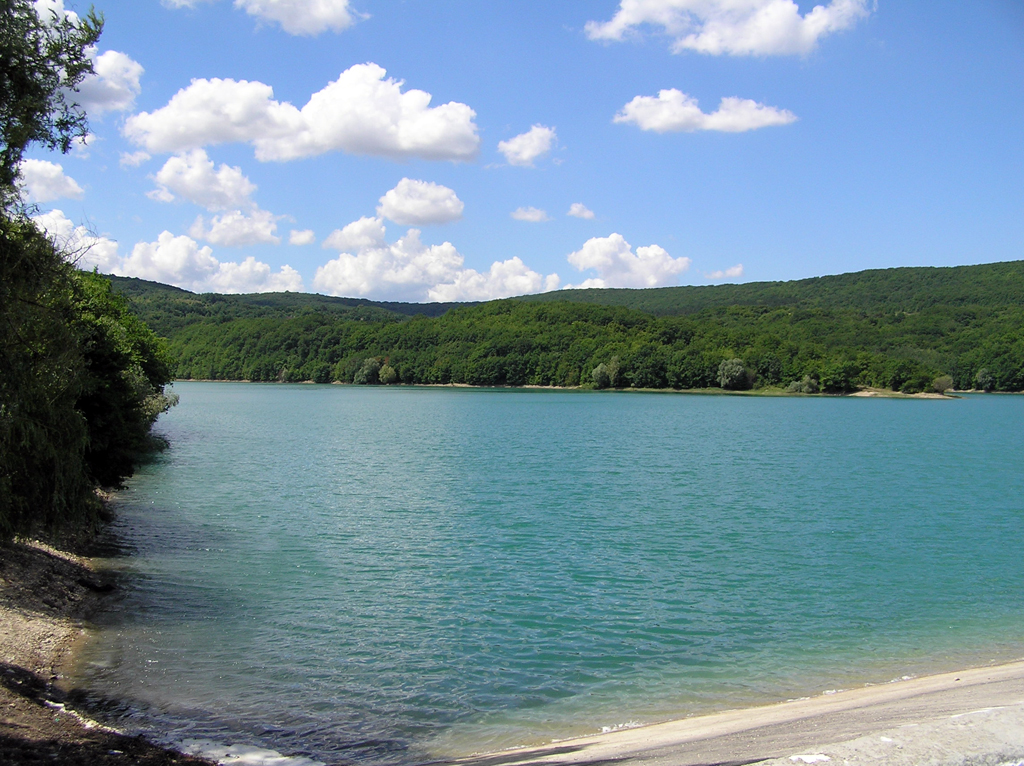
Balonov Reservoir

In 1974, near the village of Barabanove, the river was dammed with a 40-meter-high dam to form the Balonov Reservoir with a volume of 5.7 million m³. Previously, since 1926, there was a stream gauge near the village of Balanove, which was closed in 1975 due to the construction of the reservoir.

=== Beshterek-Zuisky water intake ===
In March 2021, Russian occupation authorities began construction of a new water intake and conduit based on artesian wells near the village of Klenivka to provide water for Simferopol. The well is fed by groundwater from the Zuya river and its tributary Beshterek. Following the 2014 Russian annexation of Crimea, Ukraine reduced water provided by the North Crimean Canal, which had traditionally supplied around 85% of Crimea's water. Due the loss of its main water supply, Simferopol's residents had been served water on a schedule. Additionally, by June 2020, heat waves caused ten rivers and ten reservoirs in Crimea to dry up over the course of a year, while other water sources were also depleting.

The construction of the Beshterek-Zuisky water intake was scheduled to take a year to complete, but was completed early—on the seventh anniversary of the Russian annexation—, with only two of eleven planned wells completed. Prior to the facility's opening, Russian authorities in Crimea announced Russian President Vladimir Putin would attend via video conference to initiate the water supply. However, Putin did not attend and the initiation was instead overseen by Russian head of Crimea, Sergey Aksyonov, also via video conference. Pumps at Beshterek-Zuisky were manufactured by the German company Siemens and the Dutch company Grundfos, with one of pumps bearing "Made in Denmark." Supplying annexed Crimea with water pumps is a violation of international sanctions, specifically Council Regulation (EU) No 692/2014 of 23 June 2014. The former Presidential Representative of Ukraine in Crimea, Borys Babin, doubted the companies were unaware of the project and the use of their products in Crimea, as the depths and scarcity of the area's aquifers necessitated "significant equipment" to extract any water. He further explained (quote in Russian):

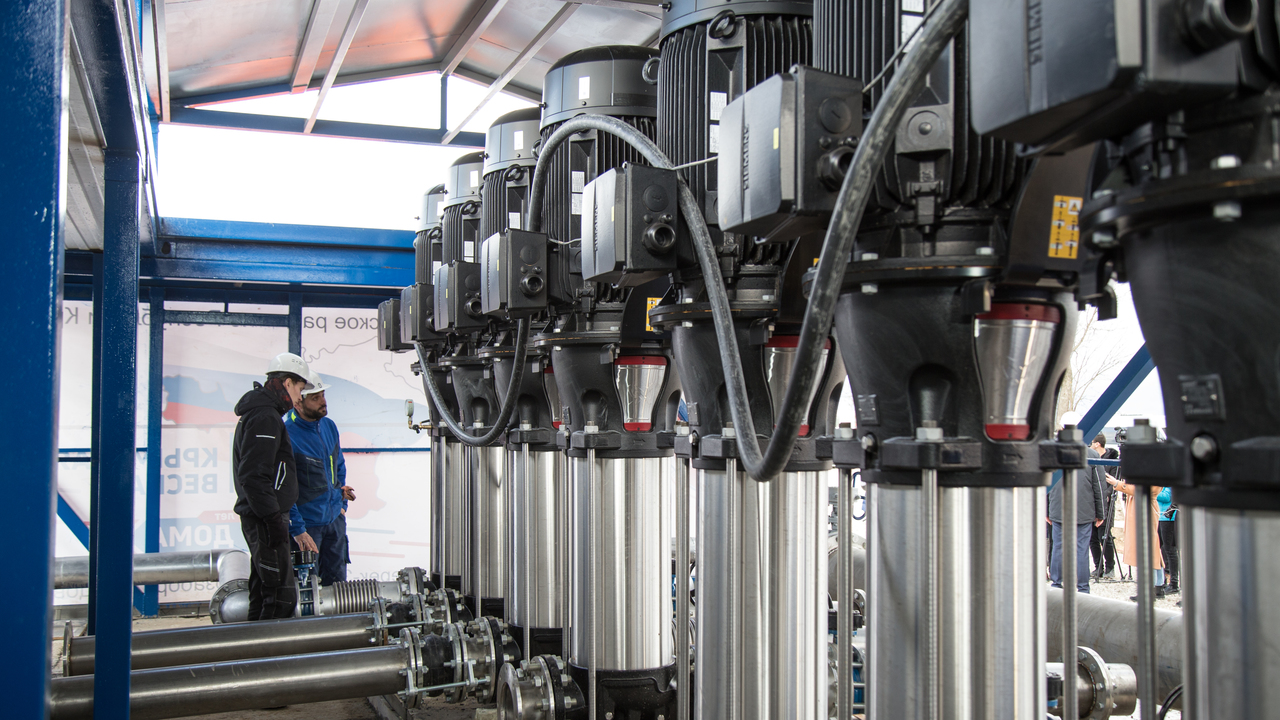
Pumps at Beshterek-Zuisky water intake. The "Siemens" logo can be seen on the equipment.

Причем это не просто насос на даче, а сложная система: здесь имеется связность скважин, необходимо сделать точную спецификацию, рассчитать мощность насосов, исходя из электроснабжения, их эксплуатации, графика ремонта обслуживания. То есть никакой европейский поставщик не будет поставлять такую технику абстрактно: ему нужна четкая характеристика объекта, понимание того, где и как он расположен. Также наивно предполагать, что ремонт этих установок будут осуществлять местные работники.

This is not just a simple pump for a summer house, but a complex system: it involves the connectivity of wells, requires precise specifications, and the calculation of pump power based on electricity supply, operation, and maintenance schedules. In other words, no European supplier would provide such equipment abstractly; they need a clear characterization of the site and an understanding of where and how it is located. It is also naive to assume that local workers will carry out the repairs of these installations.

Babin also described the project as ecocidal, as it would be destructive to the ecosystem of the valley in the Beshterek-Zuya deposit area. He also predicted small villages in the area may be left without water, as the available local water is "extremely modest" due to the aridity of the Crimean peninsula.

After 2022 Russian occupation of Kherson Oblast during the Russian invasion of Ukraine, Russian authorities restored water flow to the North Crimean Canal. In June 2023, the Kakhovka Dam was destroyed, likely by Russian forces to hinder the planned Ukrainian counter-offensive, resulting in reports that the North Crimean Canal had again become dry.

== Prehistory ==
On the right bank of the Zuya river, 120 m above its modern water level, is the Kiik-Koba grotto. The grotto sits within the northern spurs of Dolgorukovskaya Yayla, part of the first ridge of the Crimean Mountains. In the local Crimean Tatar, it is called "Kiikin-Kobasy" (Savage's Cave); In Ukrainian, "Kiik-Koba" (Wild Cave). Upon its discovery in 1924 by archaeologist G.A. Bonch-Osmolovsky, the latter name, "Kiik-Koba," was selected for formal documentation. Bonch-Osmolovsky and his team discovered burnt animal bones, hearths/fireplaces, charcoal, and thousands of flint tools, including handaxes, in addition to two Neanderthal burials. Kiik-Koba is famous as the first Mousterian site in Eastern Europe where Neanderthal remains were discovered. Bonch-Osmolovsky initially dated the lower layer of the site to "an amorphous stage of Pre-Chellean" (400,000 to 600,000 years ago). By the early 2000s, the lowest layer of the site was estimated to be from around the Lower Pleniglacial of the Last Glacial Period, around 70,000 BC.

In the 1990s and 2000s, a cultural paradigm was developed by V.N. Stepanchuk based on the upper layer of the Kiik-Koba site. The paradigm outlines the concept that each flint tool was made intentionally and each Neanderthal tribe had its own industrial tool-making tradition, territory, hunting habits, or similar. Based on this paradigm, Stepanchuk determined the Neanderthal activity at the upper layer preceded the Denekamp and the Arcy interstadials (35,000 to 28,000 BC). Recent reanalyses in the 2000s and 2010s by other researchers have proposed the stadial preceding Denekamp and Arcy.

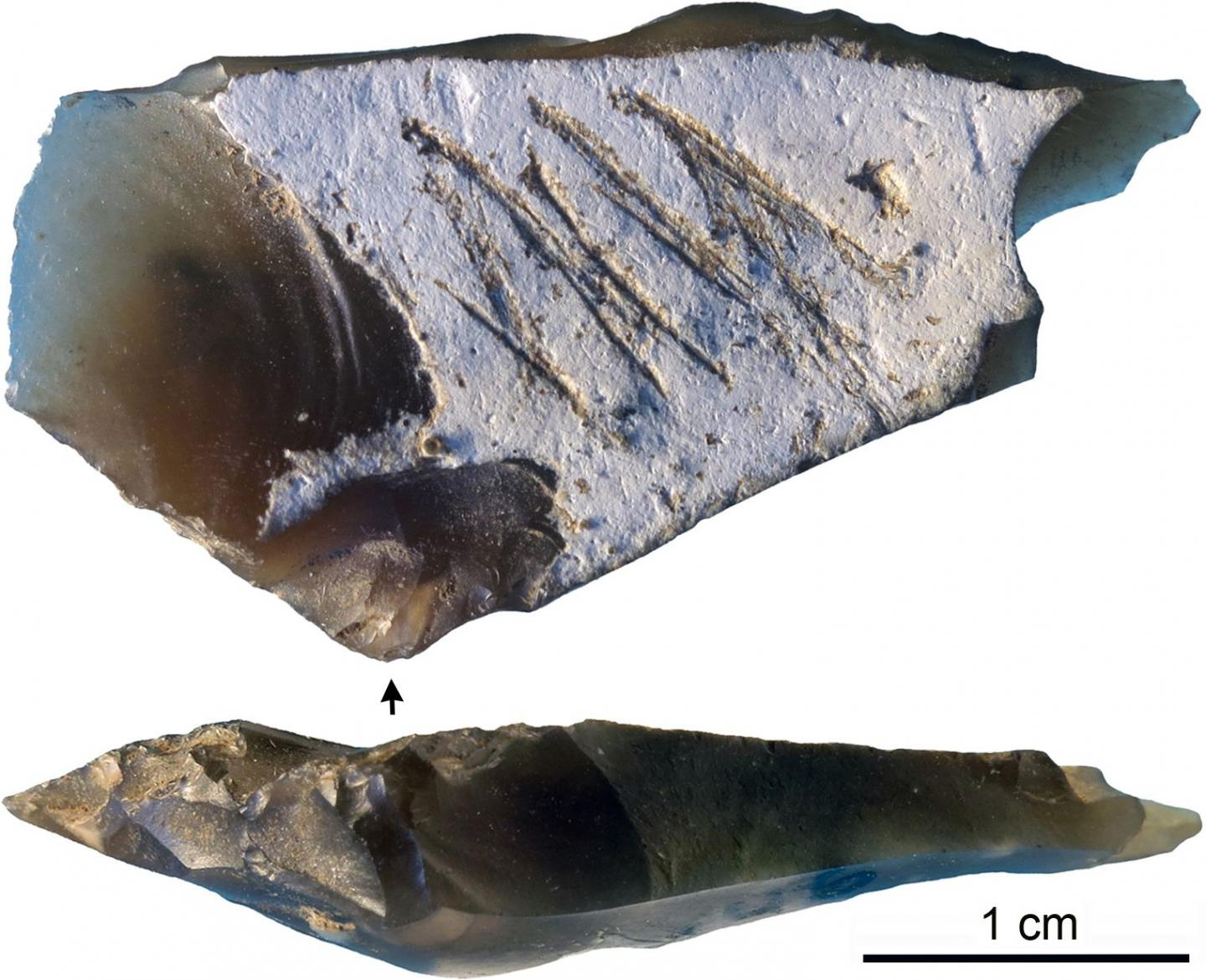
A flint flake from Kiik-Koba with deliberate engravings made by a Neanderthal

Researchers in 2018 published a report detailing a method of determining deliberate engravings from accidental markings. Following a microscopic examination of incisions on a flint flake from Kiik-Koba, the researchers concluded the incisions were likely deliberate, as the precision would require fine motor skills and attention to detail. The paper further suggested the grooves were made with symbolic intent.

The animal bones found in Kiik-Koba were heavily fragmented, with clear signs of damage from butchering, as well as long bone fragments used as retouchers (used to retouch or modify stone tools), a horse mandible interpreted as a mortar, and a pointed bone tool. The bone fragments belonged to the following Middle Paleolithic species:

- Elephas sp. (compared to "Primigenius trogontherii," possibly meaning the steppe mammoth)
- Bos sp. or Bison sp. (cf. Bison priscus)
- Ovis sp. (cf. O. argaloides Nehr.)
- Saiga tatarica
- Giant deer
- Red deer
- Reindeer
- Wild boar
- Woolly rhinoceros
- Horse
- European wild ass
- Grey wolf
- Red fox
- Arctic fox
- Corsac fox
- Brown bear
- Cave hyena
- European hare
- Bobak marmot
- Russet ground squirrel (as "Citellus rufescens")
- European hamster
- Yellow-necked mouse
- Lagurus luteus
- Great jerboa
- Common swift
- Red-billed chough

=== Burials ===
The first of two Neanderthal burials found in the Kiik-Koba grotto was of a child buried at 5–8 months of age. The child was buried in a "uterine position" near bedrock. The child's skeleton was poorly preserved, and no skull or teeth were found, though the skeleton was definitely established as Neanderthal and as originating from the Pleistocene (2.58 million to 11,700 years ago). Though flint tools were found in the grave, they were determined to be pre-existing and unrelated to the burial. The child was not found with any deliberate grave goods or burial items.

In a separate Kiik-Koba burial were the remains of a Neanderthal adult, buried at 40–50 years-old. Bonch-Osmolowski had suggested evidence that the adult's burial may have been performed by either the upper layer or lower layer inhabitants. He also considered the child's burial belonged to the upper layer individuals, and that the adult and child may have been buried simultaneously. Bonch-Osmolowski's meticulous archeological approach to the site has been compared to modern standards of archeological documentation, and his careful approach allowed archeologists to reevaluate the data decades later. In the 1970s, V.N. Gladilin concluded, based on Bonch-Osmolowski's unpublished documents, that the adult's burial belonged to the lower layer occupants. It has been generally accepted amongst archeologists since the 1980s that the adult's burial is related to the lower layer, while the child's is related to the upper layer.
