= Andreas Schönle =

Andreas Xavier Schönle, FBA is a Swiss linguist and literary and cultural scholar. Since 2018 he has been Professor of Russian and Head of the School of Modern Languages at the University of Bristol. Born in Geneva, Schönle completed his licence ès lettres at the University of Geneva in Russian and German, before Harvard University awarded him a doctorate in 1995. He lectured at the University of Michigan from then until his appointment as Professor of Russian at Queen Mary University of London in 2005, where he taught until 2018.

== Honours ==
In July 2017, Schönle was elected a Fellow of the British Academy (FBA), the United Kingdom's national academy for the humanities and social sciences.

== Selected works ==
- Authenticity and Fiction in the Russian Literary Journey, 1790–1840 (Cambridge: Harvard University Press, 2000).
- (Edited) Lotman and Cultural Studies: Encounters and Extensions (Madison: The University of Wisconsin Press, 2006).
- The Ruler in the Garden: Politics and Landscape Design in Imperial Russia (Oxford: Peter Lang, 2007).
- (Edited with Julia Hell) Ruins of Modernity (Durham: Duke University Press, 2010).
- Architecture of Oblivion: Ruins and Historical Consciousness in Modern Russia (DeKalb: Northern Illinois University Press, 2011).
- (Editor with Andrei Zorin and Alexei Evstratov) The Europeanized Elite in Russia, 1762-1825: Public Role and Subjective Self (DeKalb: Northern Illinois University Press, 2016).
- On the Periphery of Europe: The Self-Invention of the Russian Elite, 1762-1825 (with Andrei Zorin) (DeKalb: Northern Illinois University Press, 2018).
