= Nyzhnohirskyi Raion =

Coordinates: 45°26′37″N 34°44′26″E

Nyzhnohirskyi Raion Seyitler rayonı
- Raion
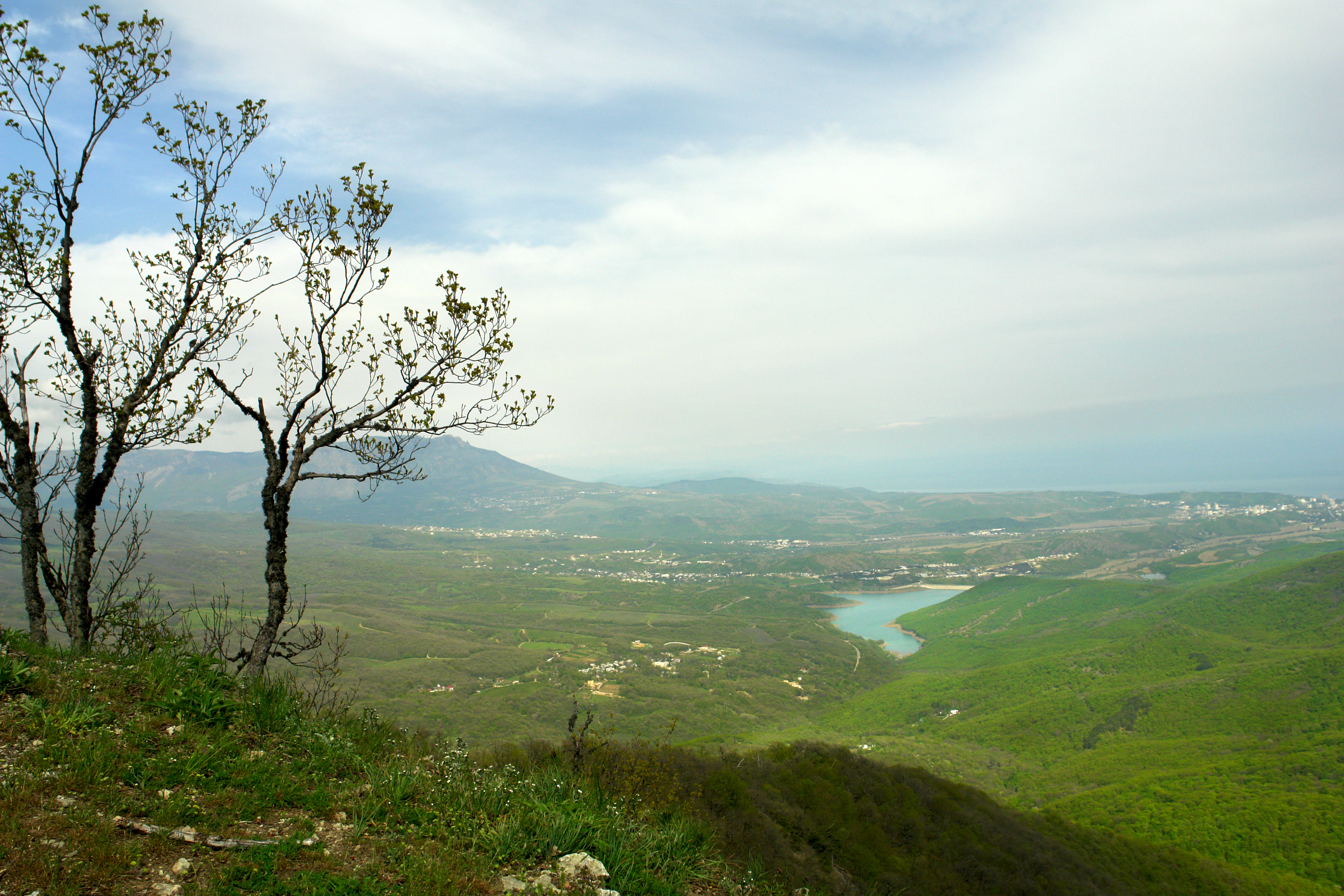
- Konek Ridge, Nizhnegorsky District

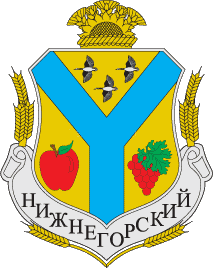
- Flag Seal
- Raion location within Crimea
- Country: Ukraine (occupied by Russia)
- Republic: Crimea
- Capital: Nyzhnohirskyi
- Subdivisions: List: 0 cities; 1 towns; 58 villages

Area
  - Total: 1,212 km^{2} (468 sq mi)

Population (2014)
  - Total: 45,092
  - Density: 37.20/km^{2} (96.36/sq mi)
- Time zone: UTC+3 (MSK)
- Dialing code: +380-

Nyzhnohirskyi Raion (Ukrainian: Нижньогірський район; Russian: Нижнегорский район; Crimean Tatar: Seyitler rayonı) is one of the 25 regions of the Autonomous Republic of Crimea, a territory recognised by a majority of countries as part of Ukraine and incorporated by Russia as the Republic of Crimea. It is situated in the north-eastern part of the republic. The administrative centre of the raion is the urban-type settlement of Nyzhnohirskyi. Population: 45,092 (2014 Census).

== Localities ==
- Drofyne
- Lomonosove

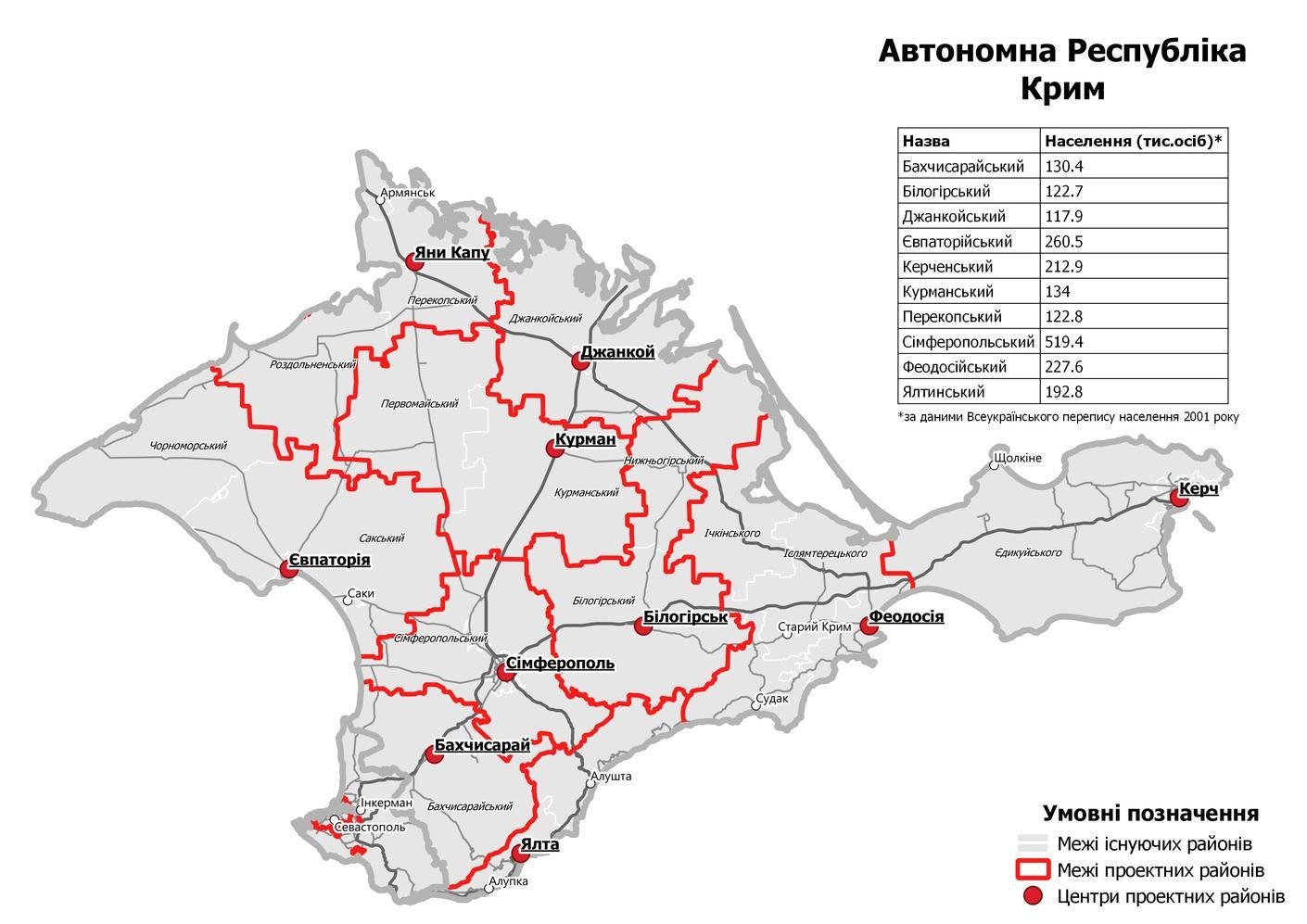
In July 2020, the Verkhovna Rada approved an administrative reform in Crimea

== 2020 Ukrainian Administrative Reform ==
In July 2020, Ukraine conducted an administrative reform throughout its de jure territory. This included Crimea, which was at the time occupied by Russia, and is still ongoing as of October 2023. Crimea was reorganized from 14 raions and 11 municipalities into 10 raions, with municipalities abolished altogether.

Nyzhnohirskyi Raion was abolished, and its territories to become a part of Bilohirsk Raion, but this has not yet been implemented due to the ongoing Russian occupation.

== Demographics ==
The population of the district is diverse. Ethnic distribution according to the 2001 Ukrainian census:

Ethnic groups
	percent
Russians	50.4%
Ukrainians	28.8%
Crimean Tatars	16.0%
Belarusians	1.8%
Ukrainian Greeks	0.5%
Tatars	0.3%
Uzbeks	0.3%
Azerbaijanis	0.2%
Poles	0.1%

== Notable people ==
- Serhiy Dzyndzyruk (born 1978), Ukrainian boxer and WBO super welterweight champion
- Vitaliy Komarnytskyi (born 1964), Ukrainian politician and former Head of the Civil-Military Administration of Luhansk Oblast
