= Soniachna Dolyna =

Soniachna Dolyna Сонячна Долина
- Village
- Location of Soniachna Dolyna in Crimea
- Coordinates: 44°52′30″N 35°06′10″E
- Republic: Crimea
- Municipality: Sudak Municipality
- First mentioned: 1381
- Elevation: 95 m (312 ft)

Population (2015)
  - Total: 1,526
- Time zone: UTC+4 (MSK)
- Postal code: 98025
- Area code: +380 6566
- Website: http://rada.gov.ua/

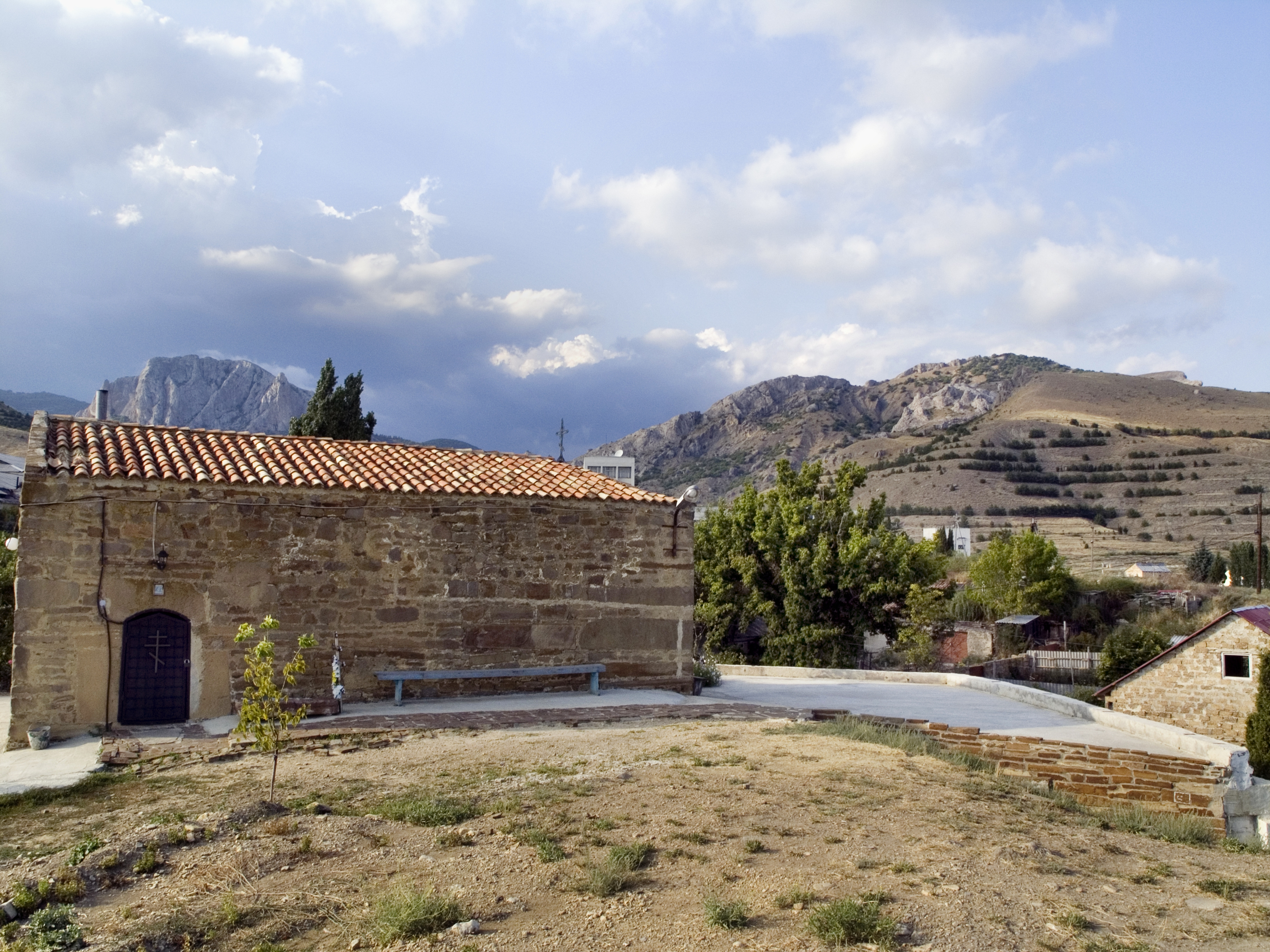
View of Soniachna Dolyna, Crimea, 2012.

Soniachna Dolyna (Ukrainian: Сонячна Долина) or Solnechnaya Dolina (Russian: Солнечная Долина) is a village in the Sudak Municipality of the Crimea, a territory recognized by a majority of countries as part of Ukraine and annexed by Russia as the Republic of Crimea.

Previously, the settlement was known as the Kozi village (Crimean Tatar: Qoz). Following the forced deportation of the Crimean Tatars in 1944, the Presidium of the Supreme Soviet of the Russian SFSR published a decree on May 18, 1948 renaming the settlement along with many others throughout Crimea from their native Crimean Tatar names to their current variants.

Soniachna Dolyna is located on Crimea's southern shore at an elevation of 95 metres (312 ft). Its population was 1,431 in the 2001 Ukrainian census. Current population: 1,526 (2014 Census).
