= Salhyr =

Coordinates: 45°38′53″N 35°00′22″E

Salhyr Салгир (Ukrainian) Salğır (Crimean Tatar) Салгир (Russian) Salgir
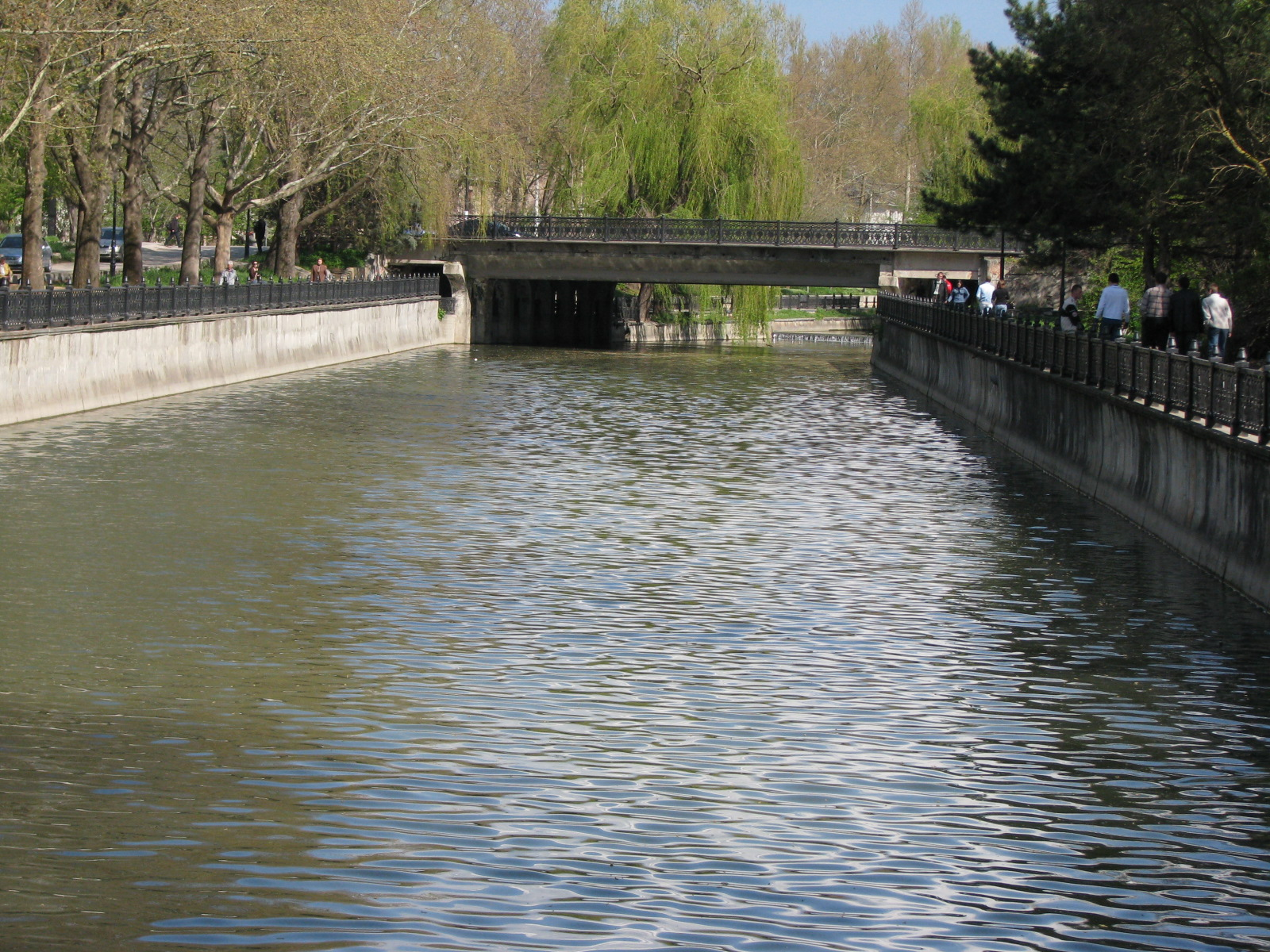
- Salhyr River flowing through Simferopol

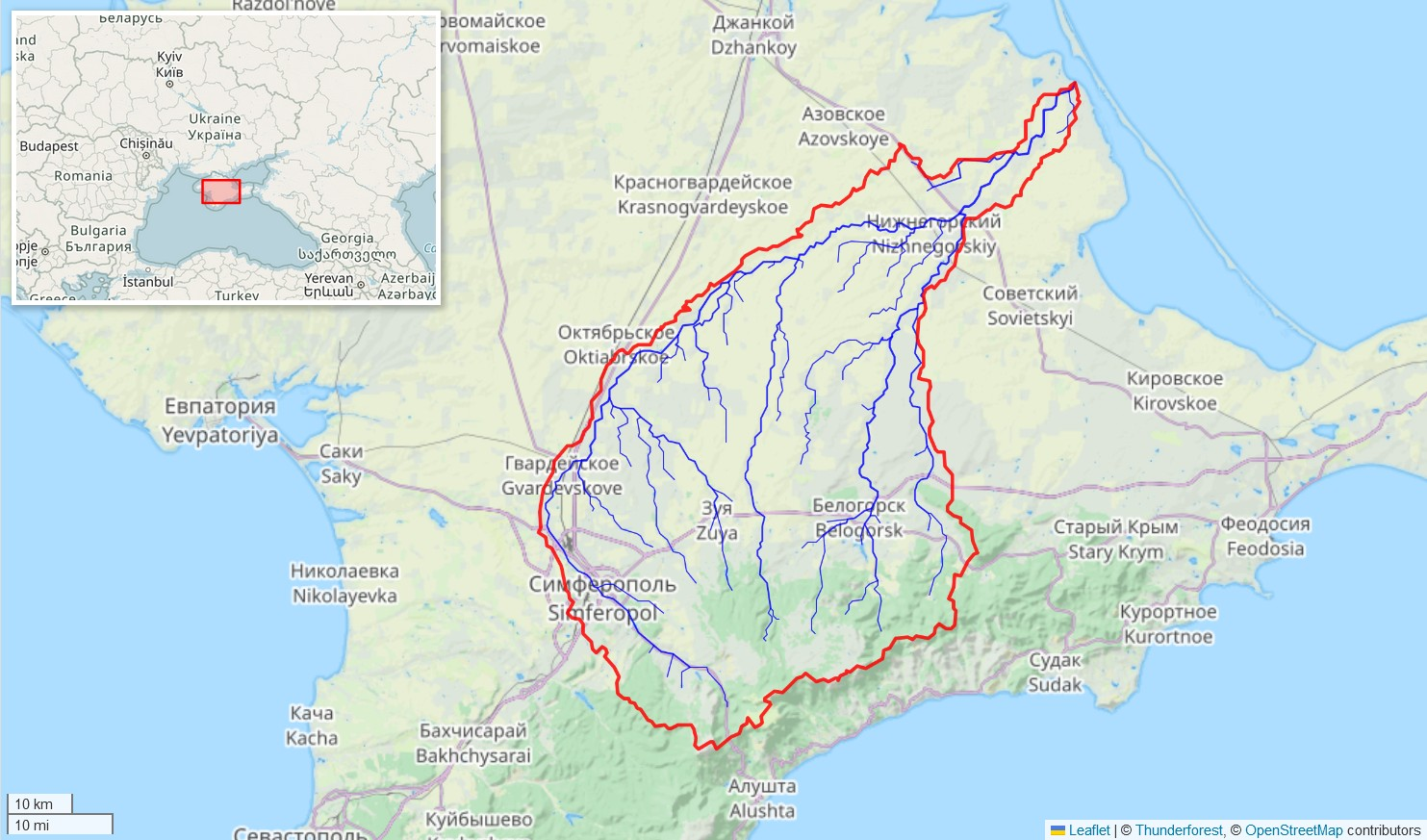
- Salhyr River watershed (Interactive map)

Physical characteristics
- Source
  - location: Chatyrdag, Crimea
- Mouth
  - location: Syvash of the Azov Sea
- Length: 204 km (127 mi)
- Basin size: 3,750 km^{2} (1,450 sq mi)
- Discharge
  - average: 2 m^{3}/s (71 cu ft/s)

The Salhyr (Note: Ukrainian: Салгир; Crimean Tatar: Salğır) or Salgir (Note: Russian: Салгир) is the longest river of the Crimean Peninsula. Its length is 204 km, and its drainage basin is 3,750 km^{2}. The average discharge of the water is 2 m^{3}/s.

It is formed in the Chatyr-Dag mountains southeast of Simferopol, passes that town, and flows north and increasingly east to reach the Syvash of the Azov Sea. Along the way, the river passes through the North Crimean Canal, previously a large affluent water from Byuk Karasu River up north Novoivanovka (Nizhnegorsk). It is mainly used for hydroelectricity and agricultural usage.
