= Bilohirsk Raion =

Coordinates: 45°03′16″N 34°36′08″E

Bilohirsk Raion Білогірський район
- Raion
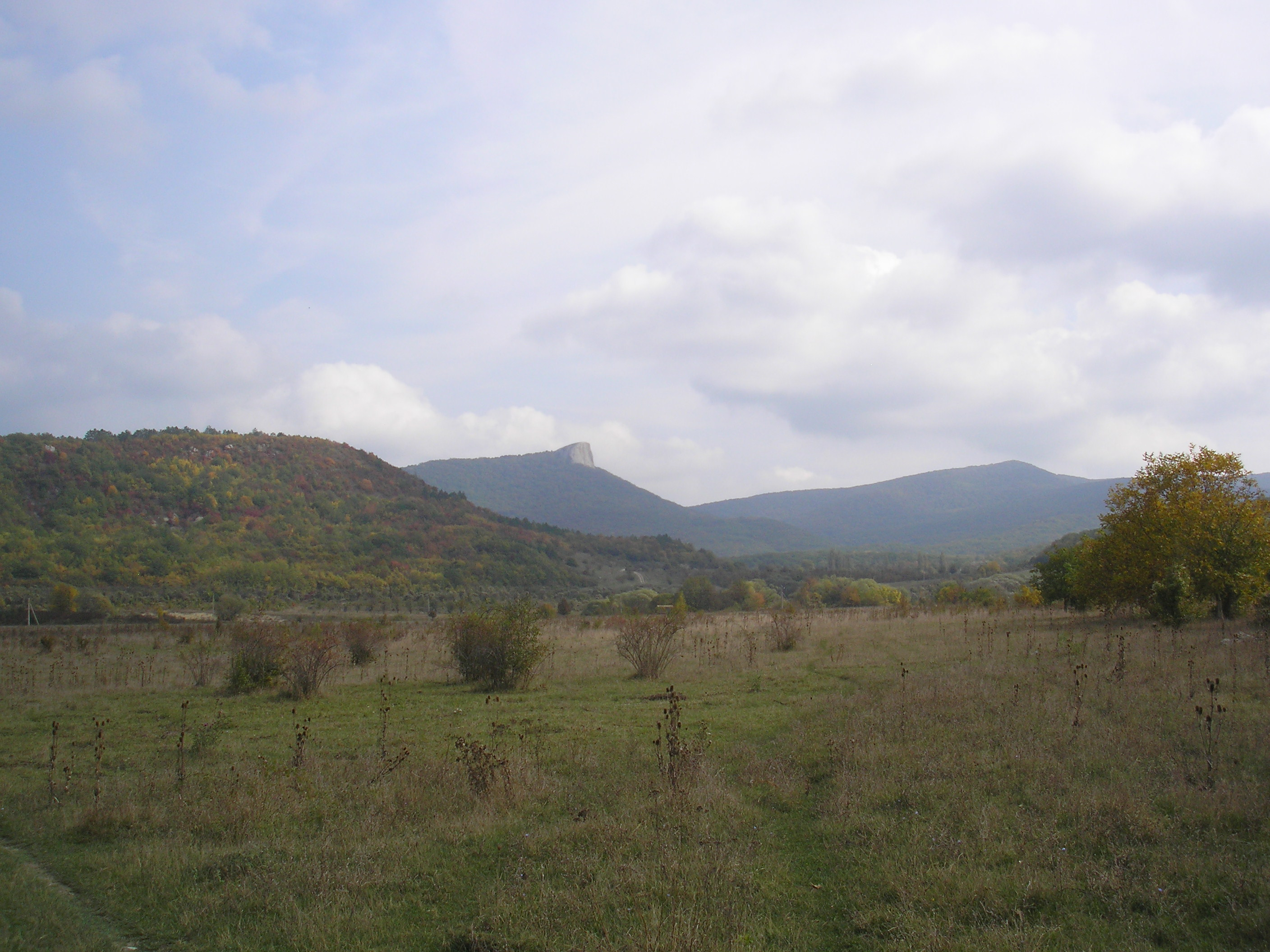
- Landscape in Bilohirsk Raion (Belogorsky District)

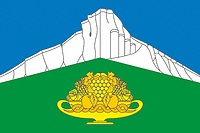
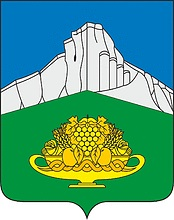
- Flag Seal
- Raion location within Crimea
- Republic: Crimea
- Capital: Bilohirsk
- Subdivisions: List: 1 cities; 1 towns; 79 villages

Area
  - Total: 1,894 km^{2} (731 sq mi)

Population (2014)
  - Total: 60,445
  - Density: 31.91/km^{2} (82.66/sq mi)
- Time zone: UTC+2 (EET)
  - Summer (DST): UTC+3 (EEST)
- Dialing code: +380-6559

Bilohirsk Raion (Ukrainian: Білогірський район, Russian: Белогорский район, Crimean Tatar: Qarasuvbazar rayonı) is one of the 25 regions of Crimea, currently occupied by Russian Federation. Population: 60,445 (2014 Census).

This landlocked region is situated in the foothills of the central Crimea. The raion's administrative centre is the historical town of Bilohirsk.

== 2020 Ukrainian Administrative Reform ==
In July 2020, Ukraine conducted an administrative reform throughout its de jure territory. This included Crimea, which was at the time occupied by Russia, and is still ongoing as of October 2023. Crimea was reorganized from 14 raions and 11 municipalities into 10 raions, with municipalities abolished altogether. The territory of Bilohirsk Raion was expanded to also include the territories of Nyzhnohirskyi Raion, but has not yet been implemented due to the ongoing Russian occupation.
