= Russian occupation of Ukraine =

- Areas and cities occupied by Russia (for another, semi up-to-date, interactive map, see here)
- Location: Ukraine (Southern and Eastern)
- Began: 27 February 2014 (Crimea); 24 February 2022 (Full-scale invasion)
- Occupying power(s): Russia
- Occupied state(s): Ukraine; Donetsk Oblast; Luhansk Oblast; Kherson Oblast; Zaporizhzhia Oblast; Autonomous Republic of Crimea; Kharkiv Oblast (small parts); Mykolaiv Oblast (small parts)
- Administration: Donetsk PR; Luhansk PR; Kherson Oblast (Russia); Zaporizhzhia Oblast (Russia); Republic of Crimea
- Annexed: 18 March 2014 (Crimea); 30 September 2022 (Donetsk, Luhansk, Kherson, and Zaporizhzhia)
- War(s): Russo-Ukrainian War

Map showing Russia in dark red with Russian-occupied territories in Europe in light red, as follows: In Moldova: Transnistria (1), since 1992; In Georgia: Abkhazia (2) and South Ossetia (3), since 2008; In Ukraine: Crimea (4) and parts of Luhansk Oblast (5) and Donetsk Oblast (6) since 2014, and parts of Zaporizhzhia Oblast (7) and Kherson Oblast (8) since 2022

The Russian occupation of Ukraine is the military occupation by Russia of parts of Ukraine during the Russo-Ukrainian war. The areas currently under Russian control lie in southern and eastern Ukraine. In Ukrainian law, they are defined as the "temporarily occupied territories". As of 2024, Russia occupies almost 20% of Ukraine and about 3 to 3.5 million Ukrainians are estimated to be living under occupation; since the invasion, the occupied territories lost roughly half of their population. The United Nations Human Rights Office reports that Russia is committing severe human rights violations in occupied Ukraine, including arbitrary detentions, enforced disappearances, torture, crackdown on peaceful protest and freedom of speech, enforced Russification, passportization, indoctrination of children, and suppression of Ukrainian language and culture.

The occupation began in 2014 with Russia's invasion and annexation of Crimea, and its de facto takeover of Ukraine's Donbas during a war in eastern Ukraine. In 2022, Russia launched a full-scale invasion. However, due to fierce Ukrainian resistance and logistical challenges (e.g. the stalled Russian Kyiv convoy), the Russian Armed Forces retreated from northern Ukraine in early April. In September 2022, Ukrainian forces launched the Kharkiv counteroffensive and liberated most of that oblast. Another southern counteroffensive resulted in the liberation of Kherson that November.

On 30 September 2022, Russia announced the annexation of Donetsk, Luhansk, Zaporizhzhia and Kherson oblasts, despite only occupying part of the claimed territory. The UN General Assembly passed a resolution rejecting this annexation as illegal and upholding Ukraine's right to territorial integrity.

As of 2024, Ukraine's peace terms call for Russian forces to leave the occupied territories. Russia's terms call for it to keep all the land it occupies, and be given all of the oblasts that it claims but does not fully control. Several Western-based analysts say that allowing Russia to keep the land it seized would "reward the aggressor while punishing the victim" and encourage further Russian expansionism.

== Background ==
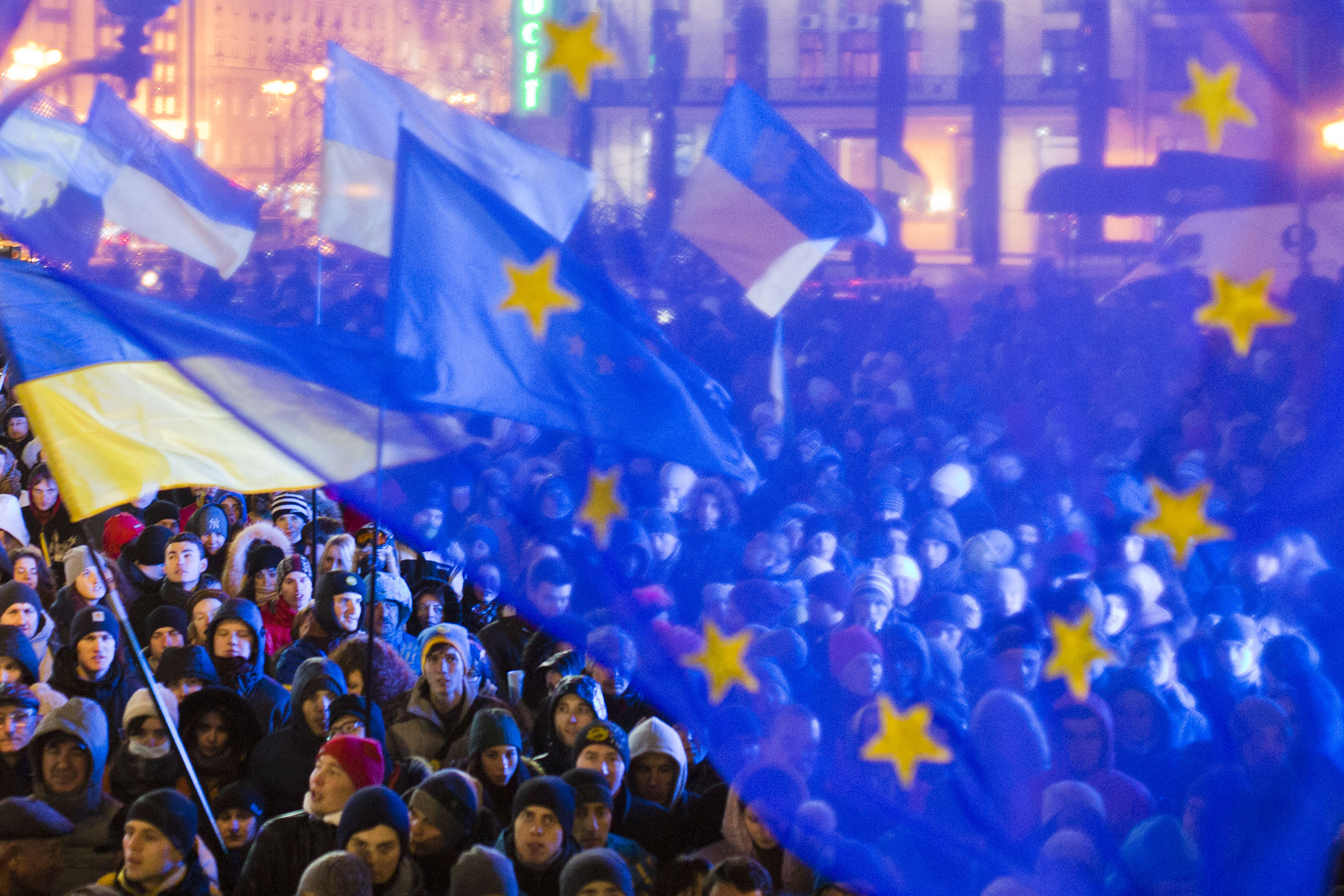
Pro-EU demonstration in Kyiv, 27 November 2013, during the Euromaidan protests

With the Euromaidan and Revolution of Dignity since November 2013, popular protests across Ukraine led to the dismissal of pro-Russian Ukrainian president Viktor Yanukovych by the Verkhovna Rada (Ukraine's parliament), as he fled to Russia. The growing pro-European sentiment at the center of this period of upheaval caused unease in the Kremlin, and Russian president Vladimir Putin immediately mobilized Russian army and airborne forces to invade Crimea, and they swiftly took control of major government buildings and blockaded the Ukrainian military in their bases across the peninsula. Soon after, Russian-installed officials announced and carried out a referendum for the region to join Russia, which western and independent organizations labeled as illegitimate. The Kremlin rejected these claims and soon officially annexed Crimea into Russia, with western nations issuing sanctions against Russia in response. In addition, with pro-Russian counter-protests across Eastern and Southern Ukraine in response to the ousting of Yanukovych, Russia allegedly supported Russian and pro-Russian militant separatists in the Donbas region in taking control of major government buildings. These separatists eventually created the Donetsk and Luhansk People's Republics, and have since been at conflict with the now-pro-European Ukrainian government, known as the war in Donbas (Russia announced their "annexation" after the 2022 Russian invasion of Ukraine).

In response to Russian military intervention, the Parliament of Ukraine adopted government laws (with further updates and extensions) to qualify the Autonomous Republic of Crimea and parts of Donetsk and Luhansk regions as temporarily occupied and uncontrolled territories:

1. Autonomous Republic of Crimea:
  - Law of Ukraine No. 1207-VII (15 April 2014) "Assurance of Citizens' Rights and Freedom, and Legal Regulations on Temporarily Occupied Territory of Ukraine".
2. Separate Raions of Donetsk and Luhansk Oblasts:
  - Order of the Cabinet of Ministers of Ukraine No. 1085-р (7 November 2014) "A List of Settlements on Territory Temporarily Uncontrolled by Government Authorities, and a List of Landmarks Located at the Contact Line".
  - Law of Ukraine No. 254-19-VIII (17 March 2015) "On Recognition of Separate Raions, Cities, Towns and Villages in Donetsk and Luhansk Regions as Temporarily Occupied Territories".

Petro Poroshenko, one of the opposition leaders during Euromaidan, won a landslide victory in the election to succeed interim president Turchynov, three months after the ousting of Yanukovych.

== Current overview ==
(Ukraine) Occupied Ukrainian regions	(Russia) Established Russian federal subjects and temporary administrative agencies	Percentage under Russian control (as of Dec 2024 by ISW)	Russia considers it part of its territory?	Ukraine considers it occupied territory?	De-facto circulating currency	Passports	Under Russian telephone numbering plan?
Autonomous Republic of Crimea	Republic of Crimea	100%	Yes, unilaterally annexed on 18 March 2014	Yes, defined as "temporarily occupied territories" under Ukrainian law	Russian ruble	Russian passports	Yes, +7 (365)
Sevastopol	Sevastopol	100%	Yes, unilaterally annexed on 18 March 2014	Yes, defined as "temporarily occupied territories" under Ukrainian law	Russian ruble	Russian passports	Yes, +7 (869)
Luhansk Oblast	Luhansk People's Republic	99%	Yes, unilaterally annexed on 30 September 2022	Yes, defined as "temporarily occupied territories" under Ukrainian law	Russian ruble	Russian passports	Yes, +7 (857)
Donetsk Oblast	Donetsk People's Republic	72%	Yes, unilaterally annexed on 30 September 2022	Yes, defined as "temporarily occupied territories" under Ukrainian law	Russian ruble	Russian passports	Yes, +7 (856)
Zaporizhzhia Oblast	Zaporozhye Oblast	74%	Yes, unilaterally annexed on 30 September 2022	Yes, listed as "temporarily occupied territories" of Ukraine under order of Ministry of National Unity of Ukraine	Ukrainian hryvnia and Russian ruble	Ukrainian passports being replaced by Russian passports	Partially, +7 (810) and +380 61
Kherson Oblast (incorporating a part from Mykolaiv Oblast)	Kherson Oblast	76%	Yes, unilaterally annexed on 30 September 2022	Yes, listed as "temporarily occupied territories" of Ukraine under order of Ministry of National Unity of Ukraine	Ukrainian hryvnia and Russian ruble	Ukrainian passports being replaced by Russian passports	Partially, +7 (860) and +380 55
Kharkiv Oblast	Kharkov Military-Civil Administration	5%	No	Yes, listed as "temporarily occupied territories" of Ukraine under order of Ministry of National Unity of Ukraine	Ukrainian hryvnia	Ukrainian passports	No, +380 57
Sumy Oblast	None	0.9%	No	No	Ukrainian hryvnia	Ukrainian passports	No, +380 54

== Timeline ==
The following chart summarizes some estimates of the total area of Ukrainian territory under Russian control, presented by various publishers at different instances during the conflict. Note that some of the estimates from the end of 2022 were conflicting.

Amount of Ukrainian territory under Russian control during the conflict
Date	Percentage of Ukrainian territory	Area km^{2} (sq mi)	Source
20 Feb 2019	7.3%	44,000 (17,000)	Petro Poroshenko, U.N.
29 Dec 2021	7.12%	43,133 (16,654)	CIA World Factbook
22 Feb 2022	7.0%	42,000 (16,000)	CNN
28 Feb 2022	20%	119,000 (46,000)	CNN
22 Mar 2022	27%	163,000 (63,000)	CNN
8 Apr 2022	19%	114,000 (44,000)	CNN
2 Jun 2022	20%	119,000 (46,000)	Volodymyr Zelenskyy
31 Aug 2022	21%	125,000 (48,000)	CNN
11 Sep 2022	19%	116,000 (45,000)	CNN
26 Sep 2022	19%	116,000 (45,000)	CNN
11 Nov 2022	20%	119,000 (46,000)	CNN
14 Nov 2022	18%	109,000 (42,000)	NY Times
23 Feb 2023	18%	109,000 (42,000)	Belfer center
25 Sep 2023	18% (0.1% points more than in December 2022)	≈109,000 (42,000) (487 km^{2} more than in December 2022)	NY Times
31 Dec 2024	19%	≈112,865 (43,577) (4,168 km^{2} more than in December 2023)	Belfer Center
28 Oct 2025	19%	≈117,143 (45,229)	Belfer Center
27 Jan 2026	20%	≈118,448 (45,733)	Belfer Center
2 Jun 2026	20%	≈118,248 (45,656)	Belfer Center
1 Sep 2026	20%	≈118,404 (45,716)	Belfer Center

== Before February 2022 ==
Ukraine (2014 – February 2022), with the annexed Crimea at bottom and two self-proclaimed separatist republics in Donbas at right

Since Russia annexed Crimea in March 2014, it administers the peninsula under two federal subjects: the Republic of Crimea and the federal city of Sevastopol. Ukraine continues to claim the peninsula as an integral part of its territory, which is supported by most foreign governments through the United Nations General Assembly Resolution 68/262, even though Russia and some other UN member states have expressed support for the 2014 Crimean referendum, implying recognition of Crimea as part of the Russian Federation. In 2015, the Ukrainian parliament officially set 20 February 2014 as the date of "the beginning of the temporary occupation of Crimea and Sevastopol by Russia".

The uncontrolled portions of the Donetsk and Luhansk Oblasts are commonly abbreviated as "ORDLO" from Ukrainian, especially among Ukrainian news media. ("certain areas of Donetsk and Luhansk Oblasts", Ukrainian: Окремі райони Донецької та Луганської областей, romanized: Okremi raiony Donetskoi ta Luhanskoi oblastei) The term first appeared in Law of Ukraine No.1680-VII (October 2014). Documents of the Minsk Protocol and the OSCE refer to them as "certain areas of Donetsk and Luhansk regions" (CADLR) of Ukraine.

The Ministry of Reintegration of Temporarily Occupied Territories is the Ukrainian government ministry that oversees government policy towards the regions. As of 2019, the government considered 7% of Ukraine's territory to be under occupation. The United Nations General Assembly resolution 73/194, adopted on 17 December 2018, designated Crimea as under "temporary occupation".

The Ukrainian army was concerned in 2019 about the deployment of 3M-54 Kalibr cruise missiles on Russian naval and coast guard vessels operating in the Sea of Azov, which is adjacent to the temporarily occupied territories. As a result, Mariupol and Berdiansk, two main Pryazovian seaports, suffer from an increase in insecurity (both cities were captured in 2022).

Temryuk and Taganrog, two other ports on the Sea of Azov, have allegedly been used to disguise the provenance of anthracite coal and liquefied natural gas (LNG) from the temporarily occupied territories.

=== Territories affected ===
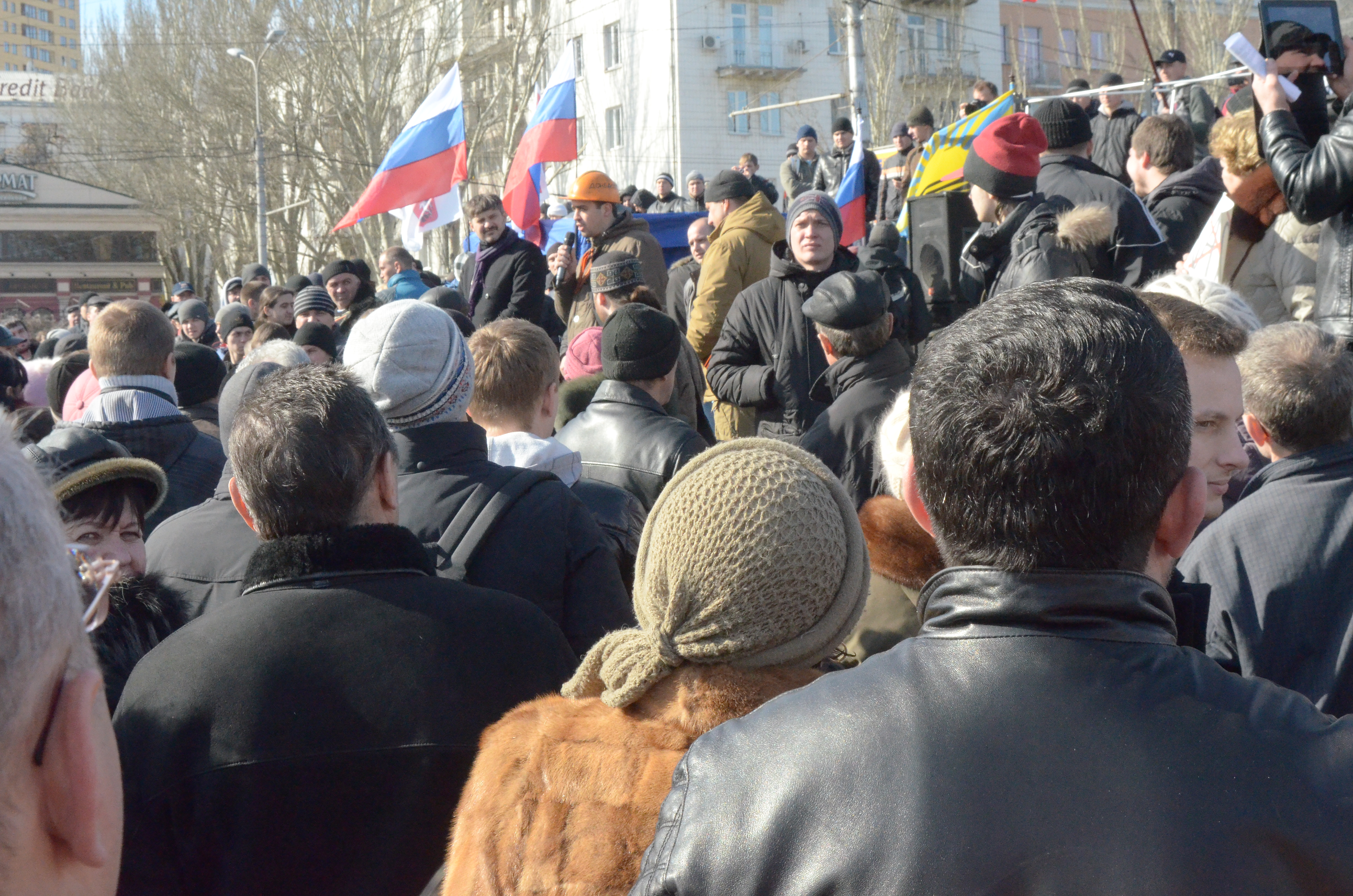
Pro-Russian protesters in Donetsk on 8 March 2014, as the Kremlin deliberately stoked separatist sentiment among some local residents.

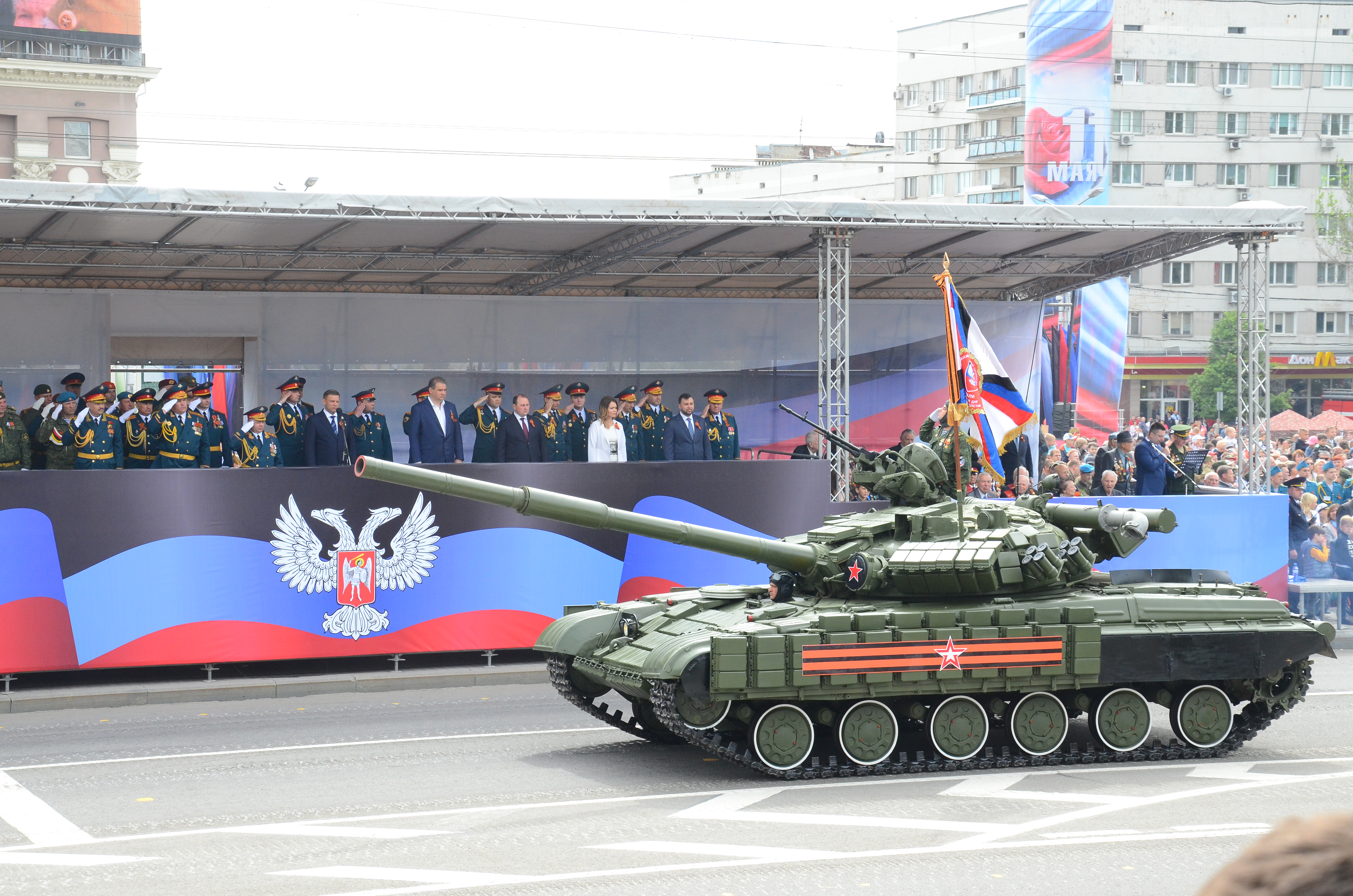
Russian-armed separatist militants in Donetsk, May 2018

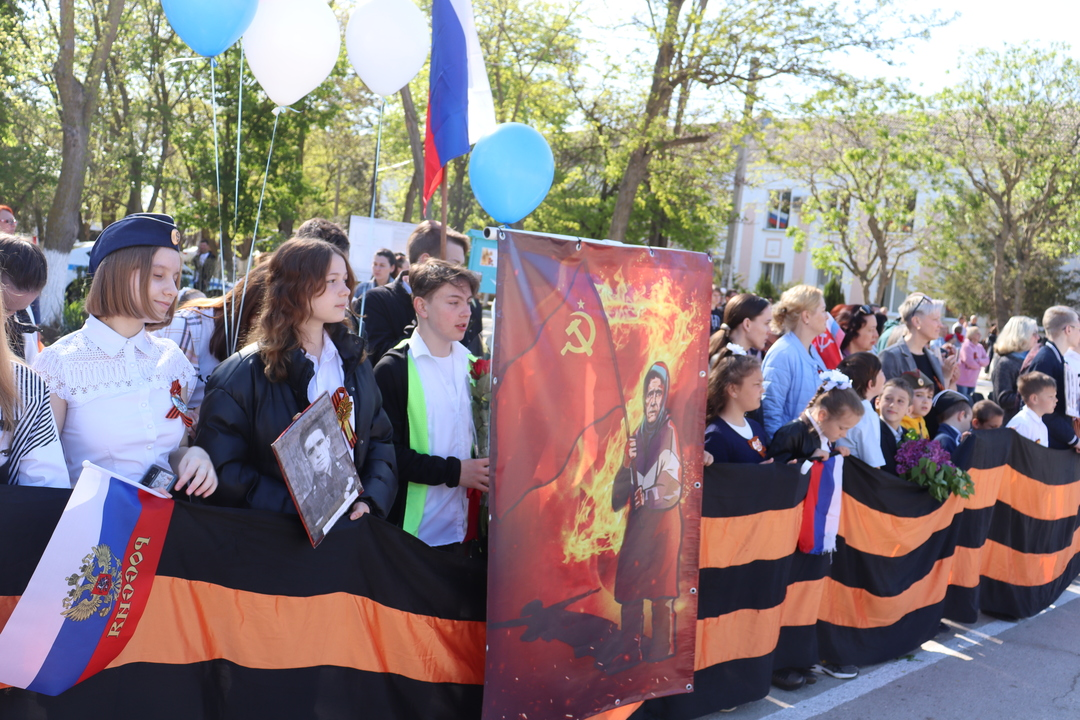
Propaganda poster of grandmother with red flag in Saky, Crimea, 9 May 2022

Since the start of the Russo-Ukrainian War in 2014, the Government of Ukraine is issuing (as extension to government order no. 1085-р and law no. 254-VIII) up-to-date "List of Temporarily Occupied Regions and Settlements" and a "List of Landmarks Bordering the Anti-Terrorist Operation Zone". As of 16 September 2020, the Cabinet of Ministers of Ukraine has made four updates to order no. 1085-р and law no. 254-VIII:

- Addendum No. 128-р as of 18 February 2015
- Addendum No. 428-р as of 5 May 2015
- Addendum No. 1276-р as of 2 December 2015
- Addendum No. 79-р as of 7 February 2018
- Addendum No. 410-р as of 13 June 2018
- Addendum No. 505-р as of 5 July 2019
- Addendum No. 1125-р as of 16 September 2020

Some settlements' names are the result of 2016 Decommunization in Ukraine.

The list below is based on the extension as of 7 February 2018. The borders of some raions have changed since 2015.

- Autonomous Republic of Crimea (entire region)
- Donetsk Oblast
  - Cities of regional importance and nearby settlements: Donetsk, Horlivka, Debaltseve, Dokuchaievsk, Yenakiieve, Zhdanivka, Kirovske, Makiivka, Snizhne, Chystiakove, Khartsyzk, Shakhtarsk (Ridkodub), Yasynuvata
  - Amvrosiivka Raion (all settlements)
  - Bakhmut Raion:
    - Bulavynske, Vuhlehirsk, Oleksandrivske, Olenivka, Vesela Dolyna, Danylove, Illinka, Kamianka, Bulavyne, Hrozne, Kaiutyne, Vozdvyzhenka, Stupakove, Savelivka, Debaltsivske, Kalynivka, Lohvynove, Novohryhorivka, Nyzhnie Lozove, Sanzharivka, Olkhovatka, Pryberezhne, Dolomitne, Travneve, Lozove
  - Volnovakha Raion:
    - Andriivka, Dolia, Liubivka, Malynove, Molodizhne, Novomykolaivka, Nova Olenivka, Petrivske, Chervone, Pikuzy
  - Mariinka Raion:
    - Kreminets, Luhanske, Oleksandrivka, Staromykhailivka, Syhnalne
  - Novoazovsk Raion (all settlements)
  - Starobesheve Raion (all settlements)
  - Boikivske Raion (all settlements)
  - Shakhtarsk Raion (all settlements)
  - Yasynuvata Raion:
    - Vesele, Betmanove, Mineralne, Spartak, Yakovlivka, Kruta Balka, Kashtanove, Lozove, Vasylivka
- Luhansk Oblast
  - Cities of regional importance and nearby settlements: Luhansk, Alchevsk, Antratsyt, Brianka, Holubivka, Khrustalnyi, Sorokyne, Sokolohirsk, Rovenky, Dovzhansk, Kadiivka
  - Antratsyt Raion (all settlements)
  - Sorokyne Raion (all settlements)
  - Lutuhyne Raion (all settlements)
  - Novoaidar Raion:
    - Sokilnyky
  - Perevalsk Raion (all settlements)
  - Popasna Raion:
    - Berezivske, Holubivske, Zholobok, Kalynove, Kalynove-Borshchuvate, Kruhlyk, Molodizhne, Mius, Novooleksandrivka, Chornukhyne, Zolote (except Zolote-1,2,3,4)
  - Dovzhánsk Raion (all settlements)
  - Slovianoserbsk Raion (all settlements)
  - Stanytsia Luhanska Raion:
    - Burchak-Mykhailivka, Lobacheve, Mykolaivka, Sukhodilsk
- Sevastopol (entire city)

== Since the 2022 invasion ==
Regions of Ukraine annexed by Russia, with a red line marking the area of actual control by Russia on 30 September 2022

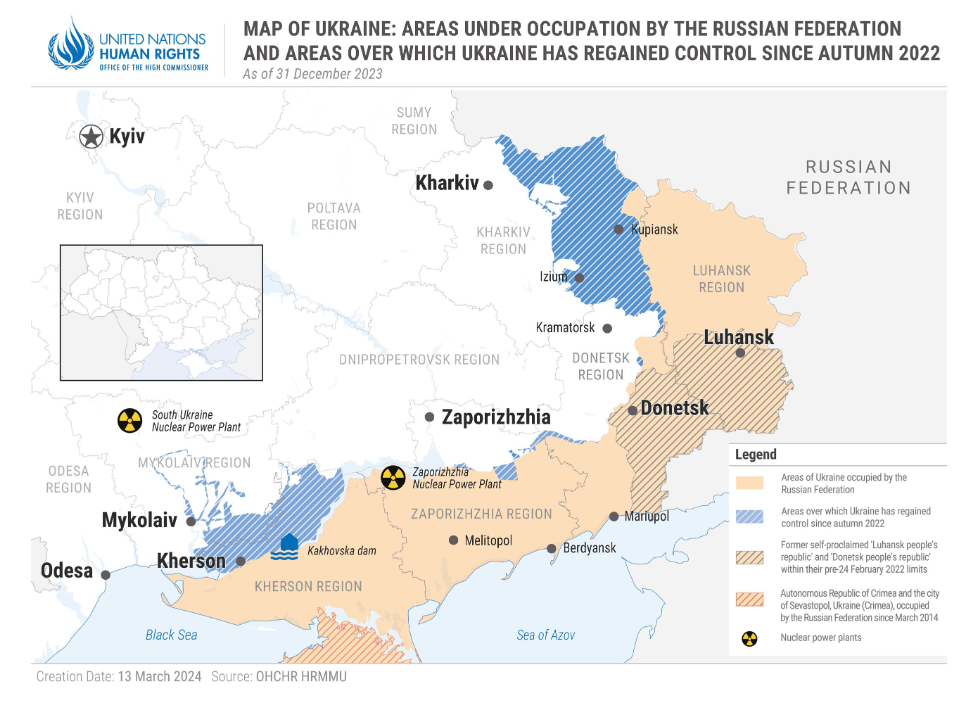
2024 United Nations map of Russian-occupied Ukraine in December 2023

After Russia's full-scale invasion in February 2022, the Russian military and Russian proxy forces further occupied additional Ukrainian territory. By early April, Russian forces withdrew from Northern Ukraine, including the capital Kyiv, after stagnating progress amid fierce Ukrainian resistance in order to focus on consolidating control over Eastern and Southern Ukraine. On 2 June 2022, Zelenskyy announced that Russia occupied approximately 20% of Ukrainian territory.

Before 2022, Russia occupied 42,000 km^{2} (16,000 sq mi) of Ukrainian territory (Crimea, and parts of Donetsk and Luhansk), and occupied a further 119,000 km^{2} (46,000 sq mi) after its full-scale invasion by March 2022, a total of 161,000 km^{2} (62,000 sq mi) or almost 27% of Ukraine. By 11 November 2022, the Institute for the Study of War calculated that Ukrainian forces had liberated an area of 74,443 km^{2} (28,743 sq mi) from Russian occupation, leaving Russia with control of about 18% of Ukraine. During the whole of 2023, Russian forces captured an estimated net 487 km^{2} (188 sq mi) of Ukrainian territory.

In 2024, Russian forces captured an estimated 4,168 km^{2} (1,609 sq mi) in both Ukraine and Russia's Kursk Oblast, where Ukraine had previously launched a cross-border offensive. The majority of the Russian advances took place in the months of September, October, and November 2024.

As of 2024, Ukraine's peace terms include Russia withdrawing its troops from the occupied territories. Russia's terms include Russia keeping all the land it occupies, and being given all of the oblasts that it claims but does not fully control.

Several Western-based analysts say that allowing Russia to keep the land it seized would "reward the aggressor while punishing the victim" and set a dangerous precedent. They predict that this would encourage Russia "to continue its imperialist campaign of expansionism" against Ukraine and its other neighbors, and embolden other expansionist regimes. Zelenskyy commented: "It's the same thing Hitler did, when he said 'give me a part of Czechoslovakia and it'll end here'." Leo Litra of the European Council on Foreign Relations pointed out that allowing Russia to annex Crimea in 2014 did not stop further Russian aggression. Opinion polls show that the majority of Ukrainians oppose giving up any of their country for peace.

=== Kharkiv Oblast ===
The occupation began on 24 February 2022, immediately after Russian troops invaded Ukraine and began seizing parts of the Kharkiv Oblast. Since April, Russian forces tried to consolidate control in the region and capture the major city of Kharkiv after their withdrawal from Northern Ukraine. However, by mid-May, the Ukrainian forces pushed the Russians back towards the periphery of the Russian border, indicating that Ukrainians continue to garner stiff resistance against Russian advances. In early September 2022, Ukrainian forces began a major counteroffensive and by 11 September 2022, Russia had retreated from most of the settlements it previously occupied in the oblast, and the Russian Ministry of Defense announced a formal withdrawal of Russian forces from nearly all of Kharkiv Oblast stating that an "operation to 'curtail and transfer troops' was underway."

=== Kherson Oblast ===
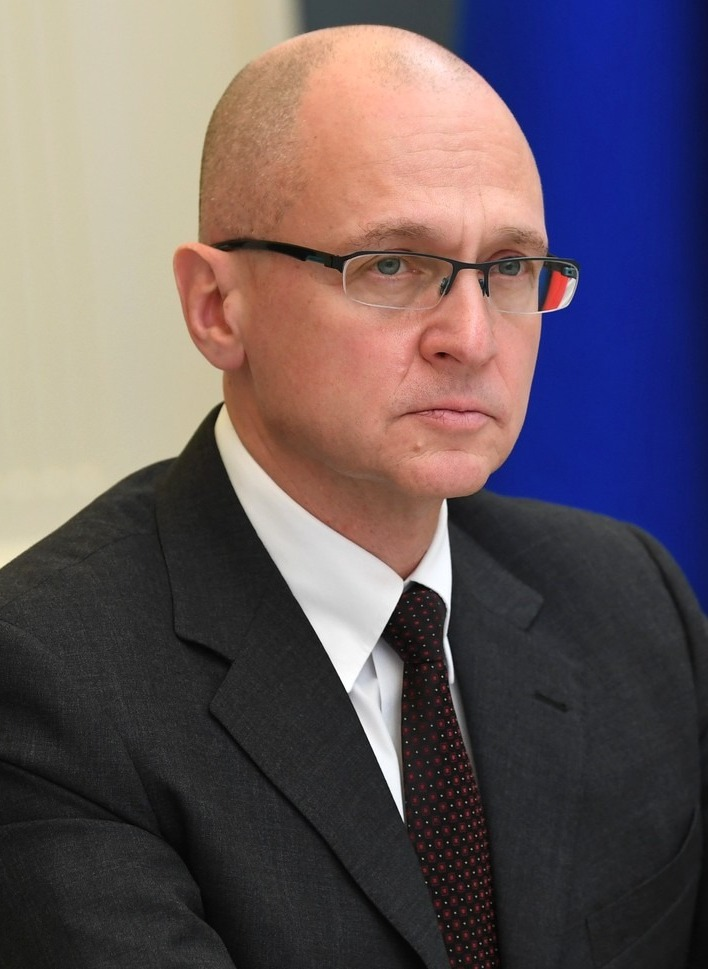
Sergey Kiriyenko became Putin's point man in the Russian-occupied territories of Ukraine.

On 24 February 2022, Russian troops from Crimea invaded Henichesk and Skadovsk Raions. During the first days of the offensive, the Russians surrounded most of the cities and towns in the oblast, blocking the entrances to them with roadblocks, but not entering the cities themselves. Significant battles were fought for the Antonivskyi Bridge, which crosses the Dnipro River between Russian positions on the South bank and the Ukrainian city of Kherson on the North bank. The Russian military's overwhelming firepower forced the Ukrainian forces to retreat, and the city fell to Russian control on 2 March. On 29 June, the Russian occupation authorities in Kherson Oblast announced preparations for holding a referendum of annexation. On 9 July, the Ukrainian government announced preparations for an imminent counteroffensive in the South, and urged the residents of occupied parts of Kherson and Zaporizhzhia Oblasts to shelter or evacuate to minimize civilian casualties in the operation. Following the destruction of the Antonivskyi Bridge and the advance of Ukrainian troops from the west, the lack of sustainable supply lines amid heavy Ukrainian shelling compelled the Russian forces to retreat. They eventually retreated from all areas on the north bank of the Dnipro River, including the city of Kherson, which the Ukrainian forces recaptured soon after, known as the liberation of Kherson.

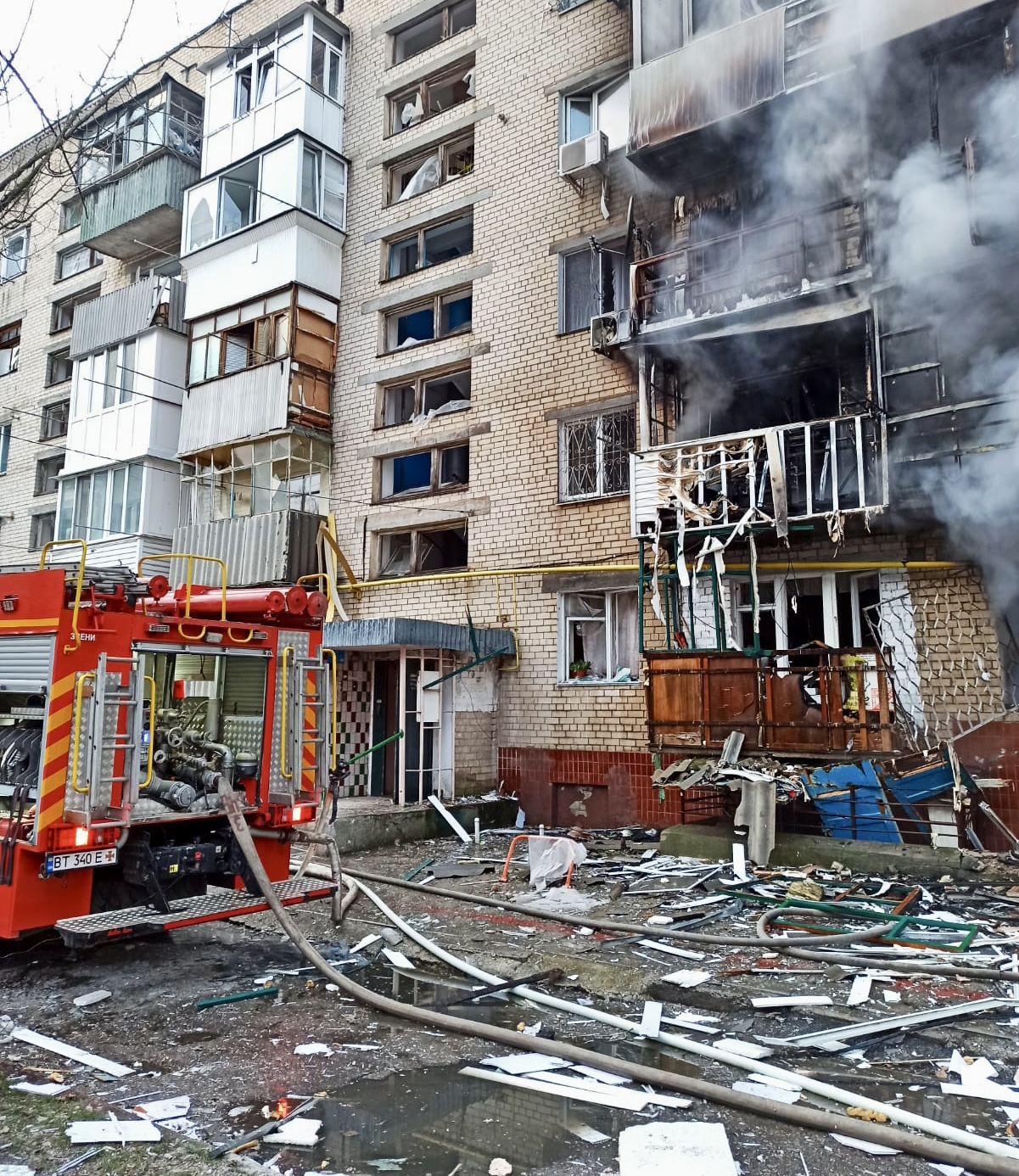
Liberated Kherson after shelling by the Russian army on 15 January 2023

Raions of Kherson Oblast that are occupied:

- Henichesk Raion
- Kakhovka Raion
- Skadovsk Raion
- Half of Kherson Raion

=== Zaporizhzhia Oblast ===
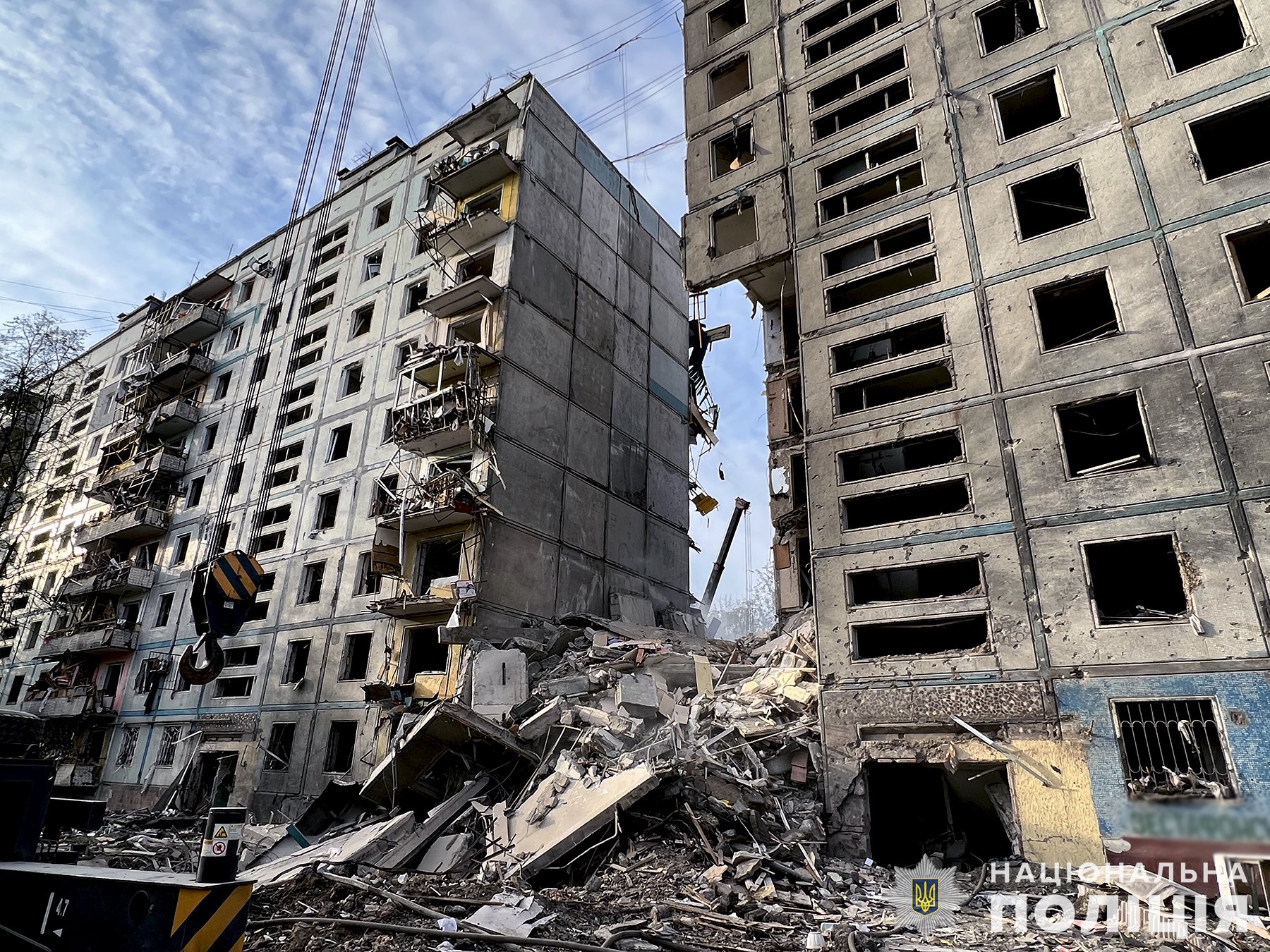
Damage to a residential building in Ukrainian-controlled Zaporizhzhia following the airstrike of 9 October 2022

On 26 February 2022, the city of Berdiansk came under Russian control, followed by Melitopol on 1 March after fierce fighting between Russian and Ukrainian forces. Russian troops also besieged and captured the city of Enerhodar, where the Zaporizhzhia Nuclear Power Plant is located, which came under Russian control on 4 March. Since July, there have been increased tensions around the power plant as both Russia and Ukraine accuse each other of missile strikes around the plant, causing fears of a potential repeat of the Chernobyl Disaster.

Raions of Zaporizhzhia Oblast that are occupied:

- Melitopol Raion
- Berdiansk Raion
- Most of Vasylivka Raion
- Most of Polohy Raion

=== Donetsk Oblast ===
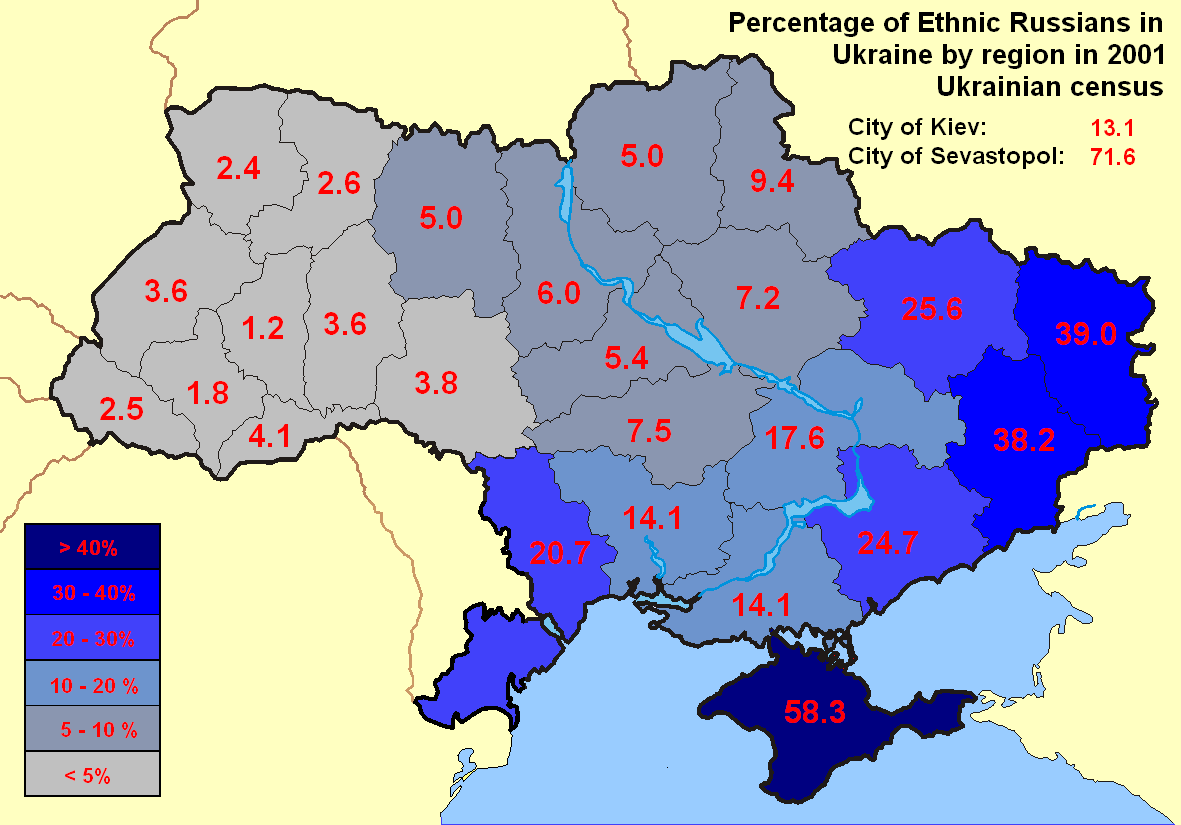
Ethnic Russians by region (2001 census). Russia used the "protection" of ethnic Russians and Russian speakers in Ukraine as one of the pretexts for the invasion and occupation.

Since the invasion, the Russian military, along with the Russian-backed Donetsk People's Republic, built on territorial gains they have made during the war in Donbas and captured additional territory, most significantly the port of Mariupol after a prolonged siege.

By 24 February 2022, the following raions of Donetsk Oblast were occupied:

- Horlivka Raion
- Donetsk Raion
- Kalmiuske Raion

After 24 February 2022, the following raions of Donetsk Oblast were captured:

- Mariupol Raion
- Volnovakha Raion
- Most of Bakhmut Raion and Pokrovsk Raion
- Portions of Kramatorsk Raion

=== Luhansk Oblast ===
By 24 February 2022, the following raions of Luhansk Oblast were occupied:

- Alchevsk Raion
- Dovzhansk Raion
- Luhansk Raion
- Rovenky Raion

After 24 February 2022, the following raions of Luhansk Oblast were captured:

- Shchastia Raion
- Staroblisk Raion
- Most of Svatove Raion
- Most of Sievierodonetsk Raion

On 3 July 2022, the Russian military claimed that the entire Luhansk Oblast has been "liberated", suggesting that Russian forces had succeeded in occupying the entire oblast and marked a major milestone for their goal of capturing the Donbas.

In late September, Ukraine said that Bilohorivka in Luhansk Oblast had been recaptured. By early October 2022, Ukrainian forces had recaptured several more settlements as their counteroffensive operations shifted focus into the main territory of the oblast. In September 2024, Russian forces controlled an estimated 98.5% of Luhansk Oblast. In July 2025, Russia claimed to control the entire oblast.

=== Mykolaiv Oblast ===
The occupation of Mykolaiv Oblast began on 26 February 2022, with Russian troops crossing into the oblast through the Kherson Oblast from Crimea. In March, Russia attempted to advance towards Voznesensk, Mykolaiv and Nova Odesa, but were met with stiff resistance and failed. By May, Russia occupied Snihurivka, Tsentralne, Novopetrivka and numerous other small villages within the oblast. All these were retaken on 10–11 November 2022 during the Ukrainian counteroffensive, which followed the withdrawal of Russian troops from the right bank of the Dnieper.

Raions of Mykolaiv Oblast that are occupied:

- Extreme southern portion of Mykolaiv Raion (Kinburn Peninsula)

=== Dnipropetrovsk Oblast ===
Russian-controlled territory in the area along the Dnipropetrovsk oblast–Donetsk oblast regional border as of 15 September 2025 Areas effectively controlled by Russia

== Formerly occupied territories ==
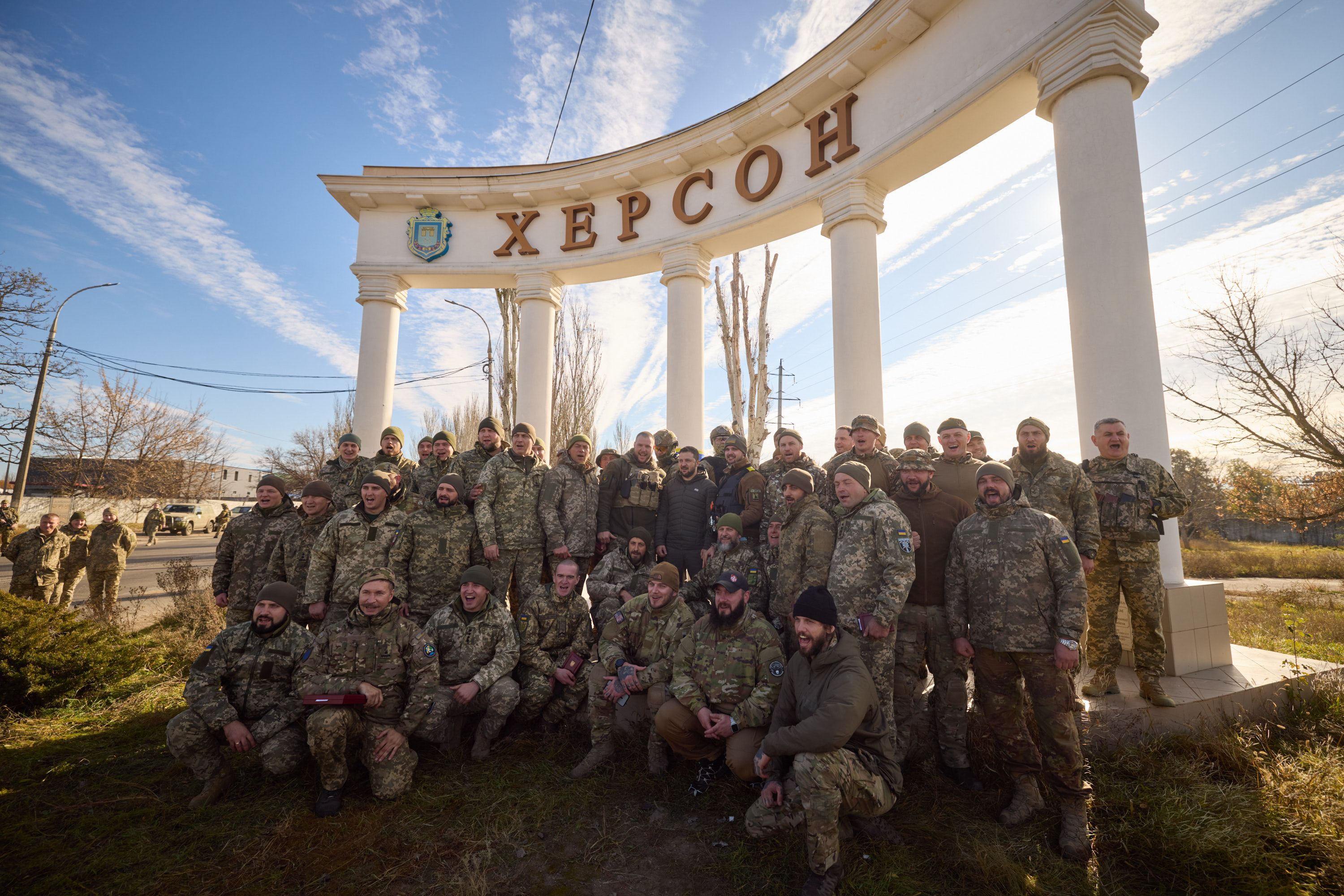
Ukrainian President Volodymyr Zelenskyy with soldiers who distinguished themselves during the liberation of Kherson, 14 November 2022

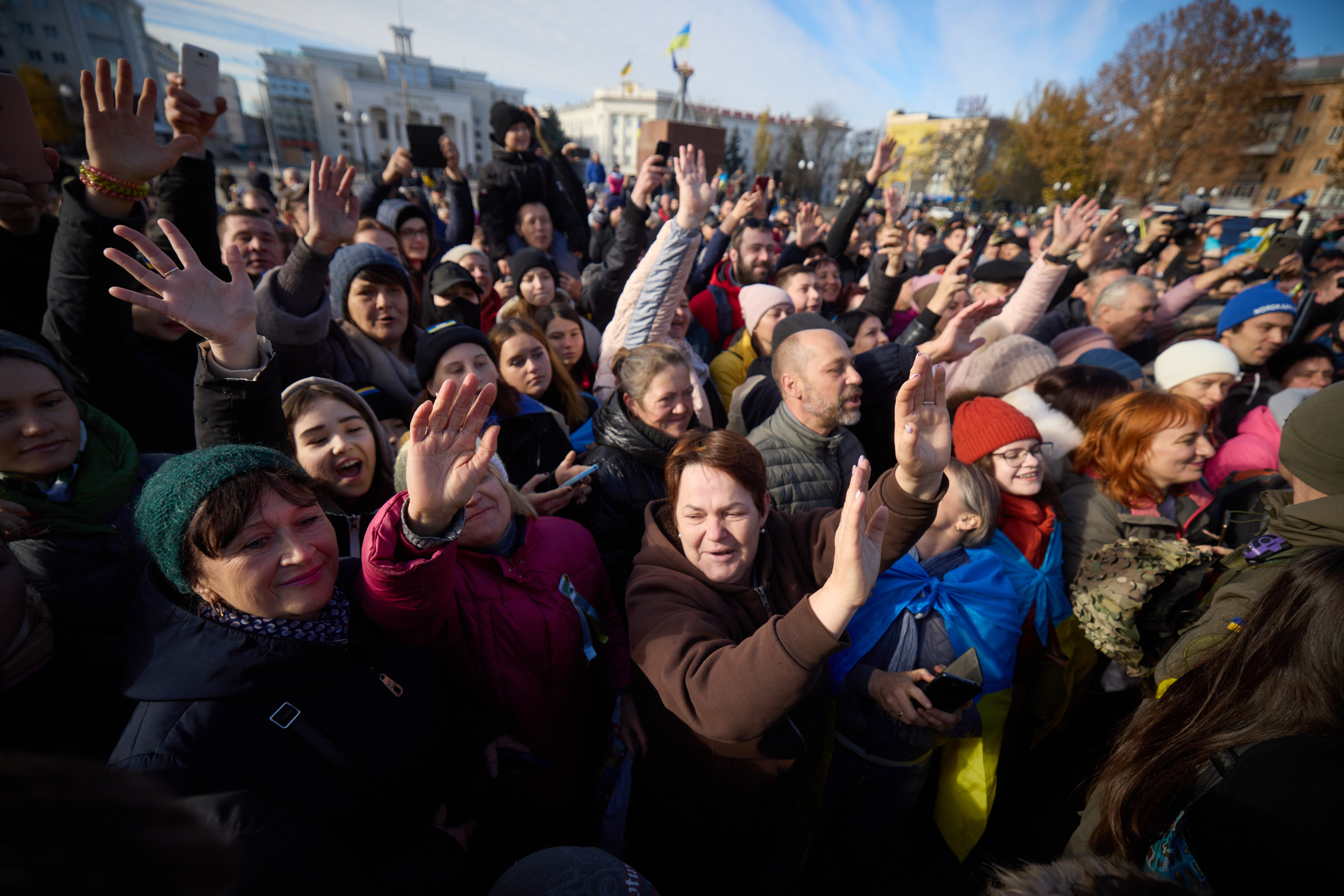
Civilians during Zelenskyy's visit following the liberation of Kherson, 14 November 2022

=== Chernihiv Oblast ===
Russia started the occupation as part of the northern campaign in the invasion of Ukraine in February 2022. The occupying forces occupied a large part of the oblast, and eventually laid siege to the oblast capital, but failed to capture the city. Eventually, their stagnant progress led to their complete withdrawal from the oblast by early April, ending the occupation.

=== Kyiv Oblast ===
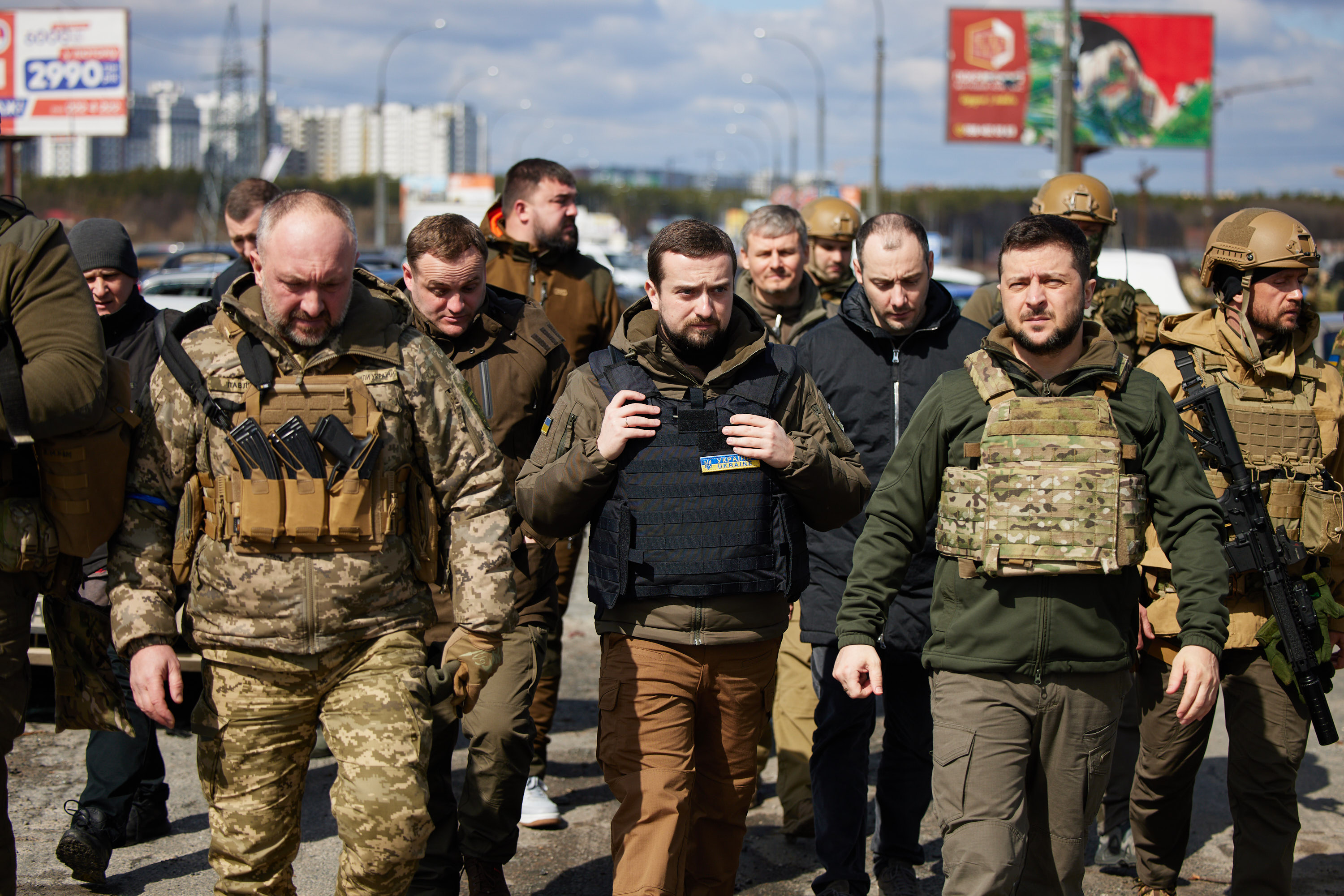
Zelenskyy in the Kyiv Oblast following the recapture of the region by Ukraine, 4 April 2022

Russia started the occupation as part of the northern offensive in the invasion of Ukraine in February 2022. Russian troops occupied a large part of the oblast, even approaching the borders of Kyiv city proper. However, the invaders' stagnant progress led to their failure to capture the Ukrainian capital, and eventually led to a complete withdrawal from the oblast by early April, ending the occupation.

=== Odesa Oblast ===
From 24 February to 30 June 2022, Russian forces occupied Snake Island in Odesa Oblast, but later withdrew after suffering heavy missile, artillery and drone strikes from the Ukrainian forces.

=== Poltava Oblast ===
During the battles of Lebedyn and Okhtyrka, Sumy Oblast, Russian forces spilled over and attacked Hadiach on 4 March 2022, and captured small areas around it, and advanced near Zinkiv and occupied Pirky on 3 March, but were repelled. According to Pro-Ukraine sources, they were soon afterwards repelled which was known as the "Hadiach Safari", since people used shotguns and rifles to hunt for Russian soldiers. Some notable areas captured were Pirky and Bobryk.

=== Sumy Oblast ===
Russia started the occupation as part of the northern offensive in the invasion of Ukraine in February 2022. The Russian military occupied a large part of the oblast, but failed to take the oblast capital. Eventually, the stagnant progress of the Russian Ground Forces led to their complete withdrawal from the oblast by early April, ending the occupation.

=== Zhytomyr Oblast ===
Russia started the occupation as part of the Northern offensive in the invasion of Ukraine in February 2022. The Russians occupied a small portion of the oblast, and never attempted to capture the oblast capital. Eventually, the culmination of the drive on Kyiv led to their complete withdrawal from the oblast by early April, ending the occupation.

== Occupation administration and policies ==
Following the annexation of Crimea in 2014, Russia imposed Russian citizenship, laws and institutions across the peninsula. Following the 2022 invasion, Russian occupation authorities similarly replaced or subordinated Ukrainian systems of governance, administration, justice and education in newly occupied areas, while imposing Russian laws, courts and administrative systems.

Russia established occupation administrations in Donetsk, Luhansk, Zaporizhzhia and Kherson oblasts and, following its claimed annexation of the four regions, sought to integrate them into the Russian political and administrative system. Russian regional and local elections were extended to the occupied territories in September 2023. Economic integration has included requiring businesses to register under Russian law, introducing Russian banking and social-security systems, infrastructure programmes, and a system under which regions of Russia are assigned patronage over occupied Ukrainian cities and districts.

== Violations and war crimes ==
The United Nations Human Rights Office reports that Russia is committing severe human rights violations in occupied Ukraine. These include arbitrary detentions, torture, looting, and enforced disappearances by Russian soldiers acting with "impunity". Peaceful protests and freedom of speech have been suppressed, while freedom of movement is severely restricted. Anyone suspected of opposing the occupation has been targeted, while people have been "encouraged to inform on one another, leaving them afraid even of their own friends and neighbours". OHCHR later found Russia guilty of enforced disppearances and torture as crimes against humanity, as well as arbitrary arrest and detention. Human Rights Watch also found Russia guilty of forcible conscription of people under occupation to force them to fight against their own country, deportation and forced displacement.

Ukrainians have been coerced into taking Russian passports and becoming Russian citizens. Those who refuse are denied healthcare, freedom of movement, public sector employment and social security benefits. From July 2024, anyone in occupied Ukraine who does not have a Russian passport can be imprisoned as a "foreign citizen". Ukrainian men who take a Russian passport are then drafted to fight against the Ukrainian army.

The UN reports that Ukrainian children are the worst affected. Schools are forced to teach the Russian curriculum, with textbooks that seek to justify the invasion. Children are also enlisted into youth groups that indoctrinate them with Russian nationalism. There are reports of parents who refuse Russian passports having their children taken away from them. The Parliamentary Assembly of the Council of Europe recognized Russia's abduction and deportation of Ukrainian children as genocidal.

Ukrainian language and media has been replaced by Russian language and media.

Russia has been accused of neo-colonialism and colonization in Crimea by enforced Russification, passportization, and by settling Russian citizens on the peninsula and forcing out Ukrainians and Crimean Tatars.

=== Suppression of Ukrainian culture ===
United Nations special rapporteurs have condemned the Russian occupation authorities for attempting "to erase local [Ukrainian] culture, history, and language" and to forcibly replace it with Russian language and culture. Monuments and places of worship have been razed, while Ukrainian history books and literature deemed to be "extremist" have been seized from public libraries and destroyed. Civil servants and teachers have been detained for their refusal to implement Russian policy. The International Court of Justice ruled that Russia had broken the Convention on the Elimination of Racial Discrimination by restricting school classes in the Ukrainian language in occupied Crimea.

== Resistance ==
During the first months of the 2022 invasion, residents of a number of newly occupied cities held public demonstrations against the Russian occupation. Open protest subsequently became increasingly difficult as Russian authorities detained and abused people suspected of opposing the occupation. By late 2022, open protest had largely given way to more clandestine forms of resistance.

Clandestine resistance has included gathering and passing intelligence to Ukrainian forces, pro-Ukrainian messaging, and attacks on Russian military targets and occupation officials. A 2023 analysis by the Royal United Services Institute described intelligence gathering and assistance with the targeting of Russian forces as the principal function of resistance networks, with direct action playing a more limited role. A 2025 study of resistance networks documented acts of sabotage, ambushes and attacks on occupation officials, particularly in occupied parts of Zaporizhzhia and Kherson oblasts and in Crimea.

== Collaboration ==
Russian occupation authorities have relied on local collaborators as well as officials and other personnel sent from Russia. At the same time, the UN Human Rights Office has documented cases in which Russian forces used threats, detention and violence to coerce Ukrainian public-sector workers into cooperating with occupation authorities.

Following the liberation of occupied territories, thousands of civilians were accused of collaboration. They are tried by a single judge without a jury. The offense is punished by up to ten years of prison, with some of those convicted getting three or five years of prison. The accused include people who worked as volunteers and held administrative positions during the occupation.

== International reactions ==
On 12 October 2022, the UN General Assembly adopted Resolution ES 11/4 declaring that the staged referendums and attempted annexation are invalid and illegal under international law. In favour: 143 Against: 5 Abstained: 35 Absent: 10

On 20 April 2016 Ukraine officially established government Ministry of Temporarily Occupied Territories and Internally Displaced Persons. It was subsequently renamed the Temporarily Occupied Territories, IDPs and veterans and then the Ministry of Reintegration of Temporarily Occupied Territories. The current minister is Iryna Vereshchuk, appointed on 4 November 2021.

In March 2014, in a vote at the United Nations, 100 member states out of 193 did not recognize the annexation of the Crimea by Russia, with only Armenia, Belarus, Bolivia, Cuba, Nicaragua, North Korea, Russia, Sudan, Syria, Venezuela, Zimbabwe voting against the resolution (see United Nations General Assembly Resolution 68/262).

The United Nations passed three resolutions regarding the issue of "human rights in the Autonomous Republic of Crimea and the city of Sevastopol", first in December 2016, then again a year later in December 2017, and lastly yet another in December 2018.

The UN's position according to the resolution adopted in 2018:

Condemning the ongoing temporary occupation of part of the territory of Ukraine, namely, the Autonomous Republic of Crimea and the city of Sevastopol (hereinafter referred to as "Crimea"), by the Russian Federation, and reaffirming the non-recognition of its annexation

In April 2018, PACE's emergency assembly recognized occupied regions of Ukraine as "territories under effective control by the Russian Federation". Chairman of the Ukrainian delegation to PACE, MP Volodymyr Aryev mentioned that recognition of the fact that part of the occupied Donbas is under Russia's control is so important for Ukraine. "The responsibility for all the crimes committed in the uncontrolled territories is removed from Ukraine. Russia becomes responsible", Aryev wrote on Facebook.

In early March 2022, in response to Russia's invasion, the United Nations General Assembly convened an emergency special session to discuss the latest developments regarding the peace situation in Ukraine, and adopted the United Nations General Assembly Resolution ES-11/1 to condemn Russia's invasion and Belarus's involvement.

== See also ==
- 2022 protests in Russian-occupied Ukraine – Protests against Russian invasion
- List of military occupations
- Joint Forces Operation (Ukraine) – Official name for territory where the war in Donbas takes place
- Malaysia Airlines Flight 17 – 2014 aircraft shootdown over Ukraine
- Revanchism – Will to recapture a lost territory
- Russian military presence in Transnistria
- Russian-occupied territories – Ongoing military occupations by Russia since 1991
- Russian-occupied territories in Georgia
- Russian temporary administrative agencies in Occupied Ukraine
- Sudeten Crisis – 1938 cession of German-speaking Czechoslovakia to Nazi Germany
- Territorial control during the Russo-Ukrainian War
- Ukrainian occupation of Kursk Oblast – Military occupation
- Ukrainian resistance in Russian-occupied Ukraine
