= Spartak, Donetsk Oblast =

Spartak Спартак
- Village
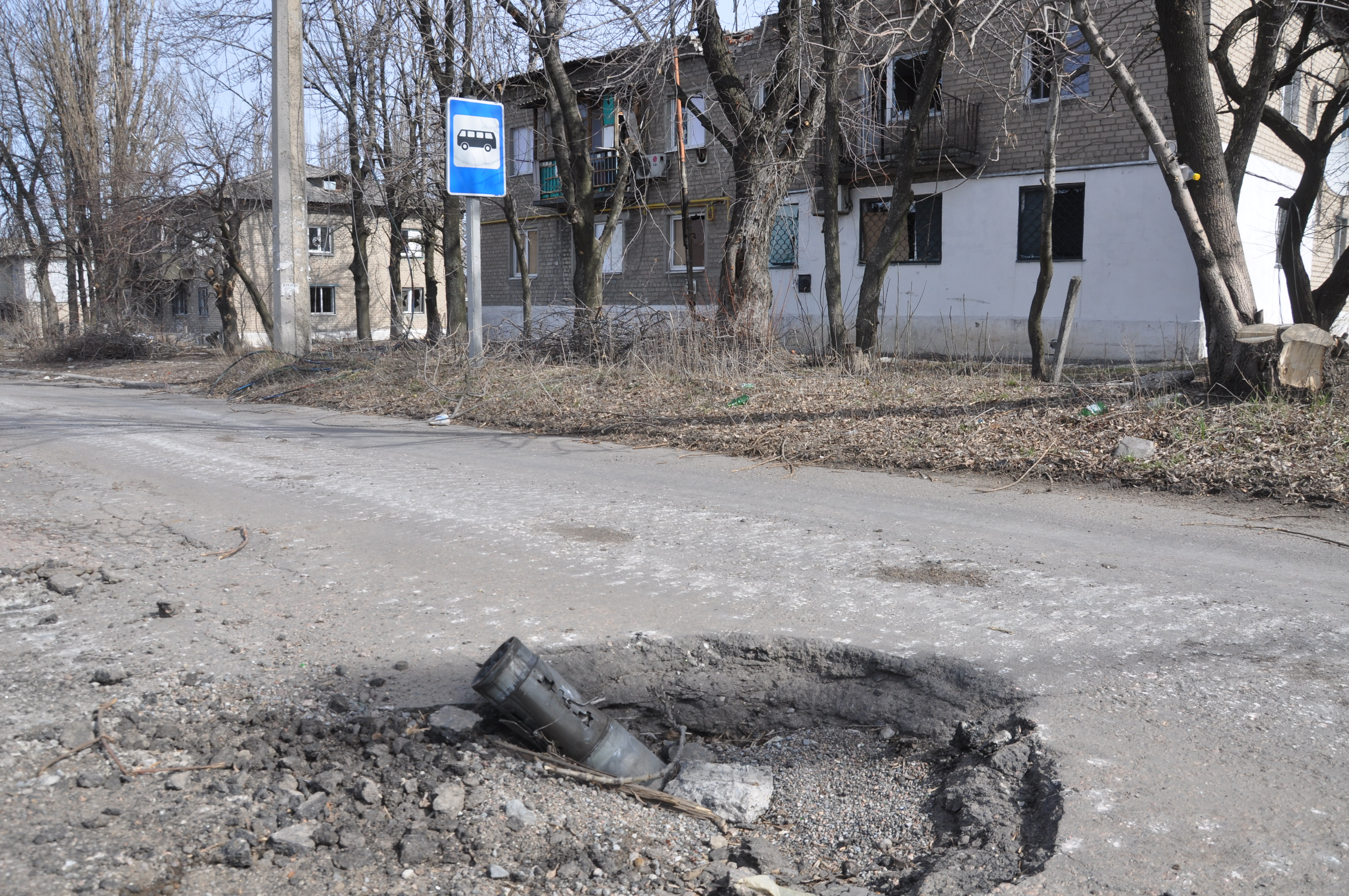
- Ammunition in Spartak
- Interactive map of Spartak
- Location of Spartak within Donetsk Oblast Spartak (Ukraine)
- Coordinates: 48°5′2″N 37°46′3″E
- Country: Ukraine (de jure); Russia (de facto)
- Oblast: Donetsk Oblast
- Raion: Donetsk Raion
- Hromada: Yasynuvata urban hromada
- Founded: 1922

Area
  - Total: 15.24 km^{2} (5.88 sq mi)
- Elevation: 232 m (761 ft)

Population (2001 census)
  - Total: 1,956
  - Density: 128.3/km^{2} (332.4/sq mi)
- Time zone: UTC+2 (EET)
  - Summer (DST): UTC+3 (EEST)
- Postal code: 86080
- Area code: +380 6236

Spartak (Ukrainian: Спартак; Russian: Спартак) is a village in Yasynuvata urban hromada, Donetsk Raion (district in Donetsk Oblast of Ukraine, at about 20 km NNW from the centre of Donetsk city. Spartak borders from south-west with the Donetsk airfield.

== History ==
Spartak was founded in 1922 by immigrants of Yakovlivka, a nearby village.

During World War II, 258 residents fought on the Eastern Front, 48 of whom were killed.

From 1986 until 2003 the village was connected to the city of Avdiivka by a tram line.

The War in Donbas, that started in mid-April 2014, has brought along both civilian and military casualties. Since then, the Spartak has been under the occupation of the Russian Donetsk People's Republic.

== Demographics ==
As of the 2001 Ukrainian census, the settlement had 1,956 inhabitants. Their native languages were 22.80% Ukrainian, 76.64% Russian, 0.31% Belarusian, 0.05% Bulgarian, and 0.15% Armenian.
