= Kruta Balka, Donetsk Oblast =

Kruta Balka Крута Балка
- Rural settlement
- Interactive map of Kruta Balka
- Location of Kruta Balka within Ukraine Kruta Balka (Ukraine)
- Coordinates: 48°8′36″N 37°49′32″E
- Country: Ukraine
- Oblast: Donetsk Oblast
- Raion: Donetsk Raion
- Hromada: Yasynuvata urban hromada
- Elevation: 209 m (686 ft)

Population (2001 census)
  - Total: 305
- Time zone: UTC+2 (EET)
  - Summer (DST): UTC+3 (EEST)
- Postal code: 86005
- Area code: +380 6236

Kruta Balka (Ukrainian: Крута Балка; Russian: Крутая Балка) is a rural settlement in Donetsk Raion (district) in Donetsk Oblast of eastern Ukraine, at 17.2 km NNE from the centre of Donetsk city.

== History ==
The settlement was taken under control of pro-Russian forces (the DNR) during the War in Donbass, that started in mid-April 2014. Since then, the settlement was located in a gray area, with both sides claiming it as theirs, until in March 2016 the Armed Forces of Ukraine reportedly moved in to retake the village. Due to shelling on 6 April 2016, the water pumping station in the "gray-zone" between the villages of Vasylivka and Kruta Balka in South Donbas was de-energized, cutting off the water supply to over 50 settlements. By early-December 2016, according to one source, the insurgents reported in social media that the village might have been retaken by the Ukrainian army and that they were unable to confirm that it was under their control. During a clash on 28 December, one Ukrainian serviceman was killed. BBC's Ukrainian Service, however, still reported Kruta Balka as controlled by separatists in May 2017.

In 2020, Kruta Balka was transferred from Yasynuvata Raion to newly created Donetsk Raion as part of the reform of administrative districts in Ukraine.

During the prelude to the Russian invasion of Ukraine, on 10 January 2022 two Ukrainian servicemen - Lieutenant Illya Suprun and PFC Vitaliy Petrenko - were killed by an unknown explosive device. Until the 2022 Russian invasion of Ukraine, Kruta Balka was the only locality of Donetsk Raion under at least partial control of the Ukrainian government.

== Demographics ==
Native language as of the Ukrainian Census of 2001:

- Ukrainian 9.51%
- Russian 90.49%
