= Russian temporary administrative agencies in occupied Ukraine =

Russian-Occupied Territories shown in red

During the 2022 Russian invasion of Ukraine, Russia set up a series of pro-Russian temporary administrative agencies in the Ukrainian territory that it occupied.

According to Ukrainian media reports, on February 27, the mayor of Kupyansk, Kharkiv Oblast, Gennady Matsegora (Геннадій Мацегора) negotiated with the Russian army to surrender the city without bloodshed, and in return he will remain as mayor of the city.

According to international media reports, on March 12, the Russian army set up a temporary administrative agency in Melitopol and appointed Galina Danilchenko as the mayor of the city, while the elected Ukrainian mayor, Ivan Fedorov, was arrested by the Russian army.

On March 26, 2022, the authorities of the Republic of Crimea announced that the Russia established a "Kherson military-civilian administrative agency" in the Russian-occupied Kherson Oblast, and the pro-Russian politician Vladimir Saldo was appointed governor.

On April 22, Dmitry Belik, a member of the State Duma, stated that after the end of the "special military operation", Russia will restore the Crimea Federal District to annex Southern and Eastern Ukraine. Russian President Vladimir Putin has previously stated that Russia had no intention to occupy Ukraine whatsoever.

== Impact on civilians in occupied territories ==
According to Sergei Tsekov, a member of the Federation Council, the purpose of the establishment by the Russian military of administrative branches in the occupied areas is to maintain people's livelihoods and optimize the management of settlements and territories, like maintaining hospitals, housing operations, human services and emergency services. The government of the occupied territory will provide food, receive and organize humanitarian aid and, in certain cases, may perform the functions of a law enforcement agency if necessary.

However, a teacher from the Russian General Staff Military Academy told BBC News Russian that the Russian military authorities were performing their supposed duties of providing for the occupied cities and that residents, while officials of the occupied areas also reported shortages of local food and agricultural products.

In order to intimidate civilians and weaken their will to resist, the Russian army often kidnapped local officials. After the beginning of Russian occupation in Kherson Oblast, almost half of the inhabitants left the city of Kherson, and one in five left Kherson Oblast entirely. Many of those who remained initially took part in pro-Ukrainian rallies, but later became diminished with reports of large-scale kidnappings, tortures, robberies and rapes by the Russian military. The Russian army prohibited people living in the occupied areas from traveling to Ukrainian-controlled areas, allegedly deported nearly 900,000 Ukrainian citizens to Russia, which the Kremlin insists were humanitarian evacuations. There were also reports that Russian authorities detained many Ukrainians in filtration camps.

In addition, the Russian army regularly intimidates or kidnaps journalists, forcing them to carry out propaganda for Russia. Lyudmila Denisova, the Ukrainian commissioner for human rights of the Verkhovna Rada, accused the Russian army of "establishing terror and censorship" in the occupied territories. There are reports that the Russian military has forced university students in DPR and LPR-controlled areas to collectively donate blood for wounded Russian soldiers, which is a violation against the Geneva Conventions if proven true.

Russian forces removed the Ukrainian flag in the occupied areas. In Yakymivka, Zaporizhzhia Oblast, they forced a local resident who had taken down the Russian flag to apologize to the camera. The occupied territory is trying to replace the Ukrainian hryvnia with the Russian ruble, and also issues Russian passports in the occupied territory. In addition, Ukrainian-language channels have largely stopped broadcasts in the occupied areas, and television towers have been replaced by Russian-language channels.

== Russian administrative agencies by Oblast ==
=== Mykolaiv Oblast ===
Governor: Yuriy Barbashov

=== Kherson Oblast ===
- Military Government Chair: Victor Berluk
- Military Government Vice-chair: Vladimir Saldo (also VP of Salvation Committee for Peace and Order)
- Governor: Sergei Yeliseyev
- Lieutenant-governor: ~~Kirill Stremousov~~ (also President of Salvation Committee for Peace and Order), died in a car crash
- Lieutenant-governor: Ekaterina Gubareva
- Lieutenant-governor: Vitaly Bulyuk
- Mayor of Kherson: Oleksandr Kobets
- Mayor of Kakhovka: Pavlo Filipchuk
- Mayor of Nova Kakhovka: Vladimir Leondyev
- Mayor of Skadovsk: Sergei Shvaiko

=== Zaporizhzhia Oblast ===
- Governor: Yevgeny Balitsky
- Mayor of Melitopol: Galina Danilchenko
- Mayor of Berdiansk: Oleksandr Saulenko
- Mayor of Enerhodar: Andrii Shevchyk

=== Donetsk Oblast ===
- Mayor of Mariupol: Konstantin Ivashchenko
- Vice-Mayor of Mariupol: Victoria Karacheva
- Mayor of Volnovakha: Artur Anziferov

=== Luhansk Oblast ===
- Mayor of Rubizhne: Serhiy Khortiv

=== Kharkiv Oblast ===
- Governor: ~~Vitaly Ganchev~~, lost control over most of the oblast, subsequently fled to Russia
- Lieutenant-governor: Andrey Alekseyenko
- Mayor of Velykyi Burluk: ~~Yevgeny Yunakov~~, killed by Ukrainian resistance
- Mayor of Kupyansk: ~~Gennady Matsegora~~, lost control over the city, subsequently fled to Russia
- Mayor of Izium: ~~Vladislav Sokolov~~, lost control over the city, subsequently fled to Russia

== See also ==
- Russian-occupied Kherson Oblast
- Russian-occupied Zaporizhzhia Oblast
- Russian-occupied territories of Ukraine
