= Yasynuvata urban hromada =

Yasynuvata urban hromada Ясинуватська міська громада
- Hromada
- Interactive map of Yasynuvata urban hromada
- Country: Ukraine
- Oblast: Donetsk
- Raion: Donetsk
- Admin. center: Yasynuvata
- Settlements: 7
- Cities: 1
- Rural settlements: 3
- Villages: 3

Yasynuvata urban hromada (Ukrainian: Ясинуватська міська громада) is a prospective hromada of Ukraine, located in Donetsk Raion, Donetsk Oblast. Its administrative center is the city Yasynuvata.

The hromada contains 7 settlements: 1 city (Yasynuvata), 3 villages (Spartak, Vesele, and Yakovlivka), and 3 rural-type settlements (Kashtanove, Kruta Balka, and Mineralne).

== See also ==
- List of hromadas of Ukraine
