= Pirky, Poltava Oblast =

Village in Poltava Oblast, Ukraine

Pirky Пірки
- Village
- Location of Pirky within Ukraine Pirky (Ukraine)
- Coordinates: 50°15′57″N 34°25′18″E
- Sovereign State: Ukraine
- Oblast: Poltava Oblast
- Raion: Poltava Raion
- First Settled: 1726

Area
  - Total: 4,865 km^{2} (1,878 sq mi)
- Elevation: 116 m (381 ft)

Population
  - Total: 703
  - Density: 144.4/km^{2} (374/sq mi)
- Postal Code: 38114

Pirky (Ukrainian: Пірки) is a village in Poltava Raion of Poltava Oblast, Ukraine. It belongs to Zinkiv urban hromada, one of the hromadas of Ukraine. Pirky has a population of 703. The body of local self-government is the Tarasiv village council.

== Geography ==
The village is located on the banks of the Tashan river. This causes much of the area to be formed to estuaries, marshlands and swamps, due to the river's windiness. The elevation is 116 meters. It is located 7.5 kilometers from Zinkiv.

== History ==
During the Holodomor, in 1932–1933, 524 people died.

Up until 2016, the village was called Komsomolske.

Until 18 July 2020, Pirky belonged to Zinkiv Raion. The raion was abolished in July 2020 as part of the administrative reform of Ukraine, which reduced the number of raions of Poltava Oblast to four. The area of Zinkiv Raion was merged into Poltava Raion.

In 2022, Russian troops invaded Ukraine and captured Pirky. It was later retaken by Ukraine.
