= Yakovlivka, Donetsk Raion, Donetsk Oblast =

Yakovlivka Яковлівка
- Village
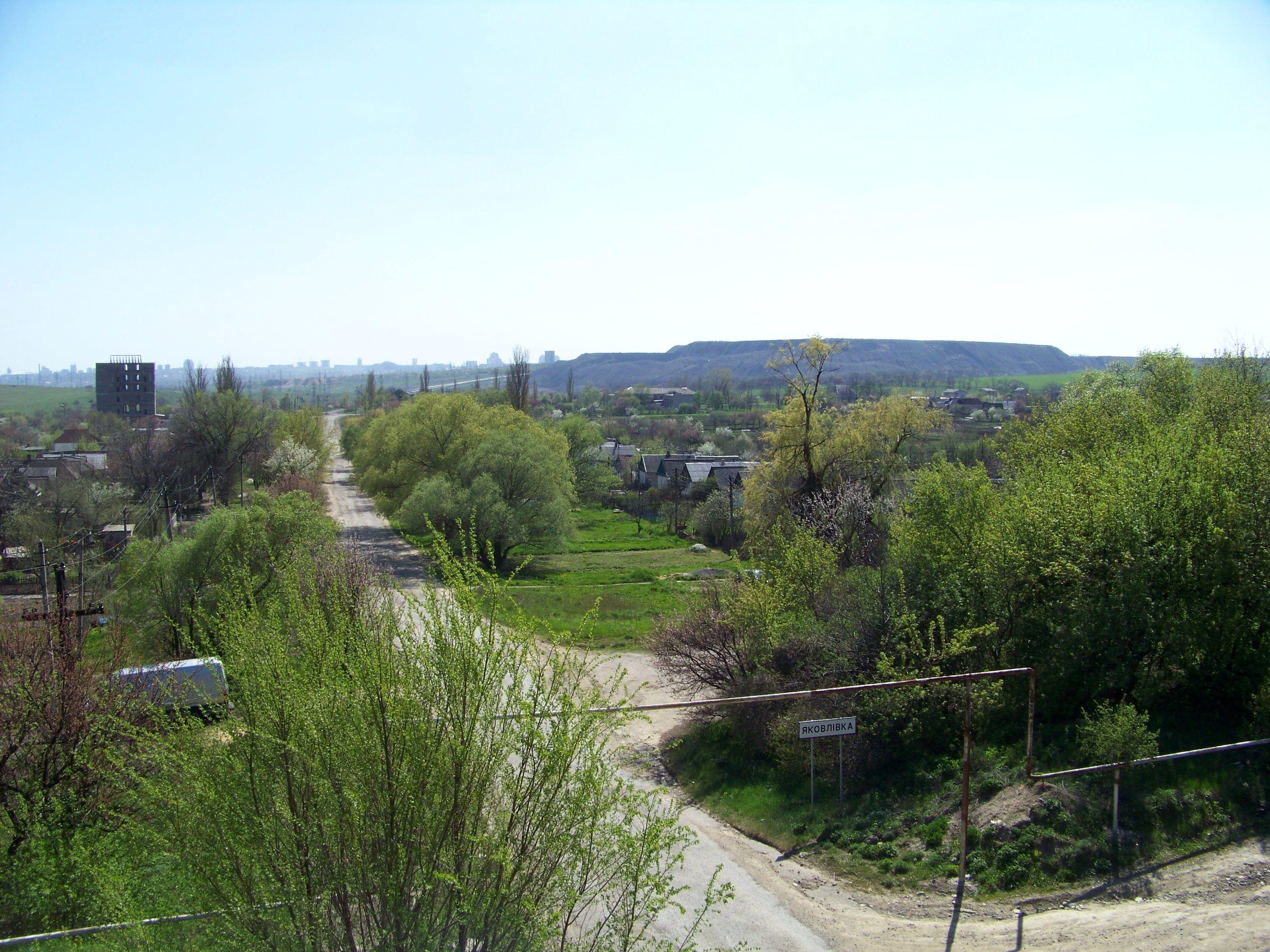
- A street in the eastern part of the village
- Interactive map of Yakovlivka
- Location of Yakovlivka within Ukraine Yakovlivka (Ukraine)
- Coordinates: 48.089722°N 37.826667°E
- Country: Ukraine
- Oblast: Donetsk Oblast
- Raion: Donetsk Raion
- Hromada: Yasynuvata urban hromada
- Elevation: 193 m (633 ft)

Population (2001 census)
  - Total: 971
- Time zone: UTC+2 (EET)
  - Summer (DST): UTC+3 (EEST)
- Postal code: 86082
- Area code: +380 6236

Yakovlivka (Ukrainian: Яковлівка; Russian: Яковлевка) is a village in Yasynuvata urban hromada, Donetsk Raion (district; formerly Yasynuvata Raion) in Donetsk Oblast of eastern Ukraine, at 9.9 km NNE from the centre of Donetsk city, on the right bank of the Kalmius river.

The settlement was taken under control of Russian forces during the War in Donbass, that started in mid-April 2014.

== Demographics ==
In 2001 the settlement had 971 inhabitants. Native language distribution as of the Ukrainian Census of 2001:

- Ukrainian: 59.65%
- Russian: 39.42%
- other languages: 0.93%
