= Kalmius =

River in Donetsk Oblast, Ukraine

Kalmius Кальміус, Кальмиус
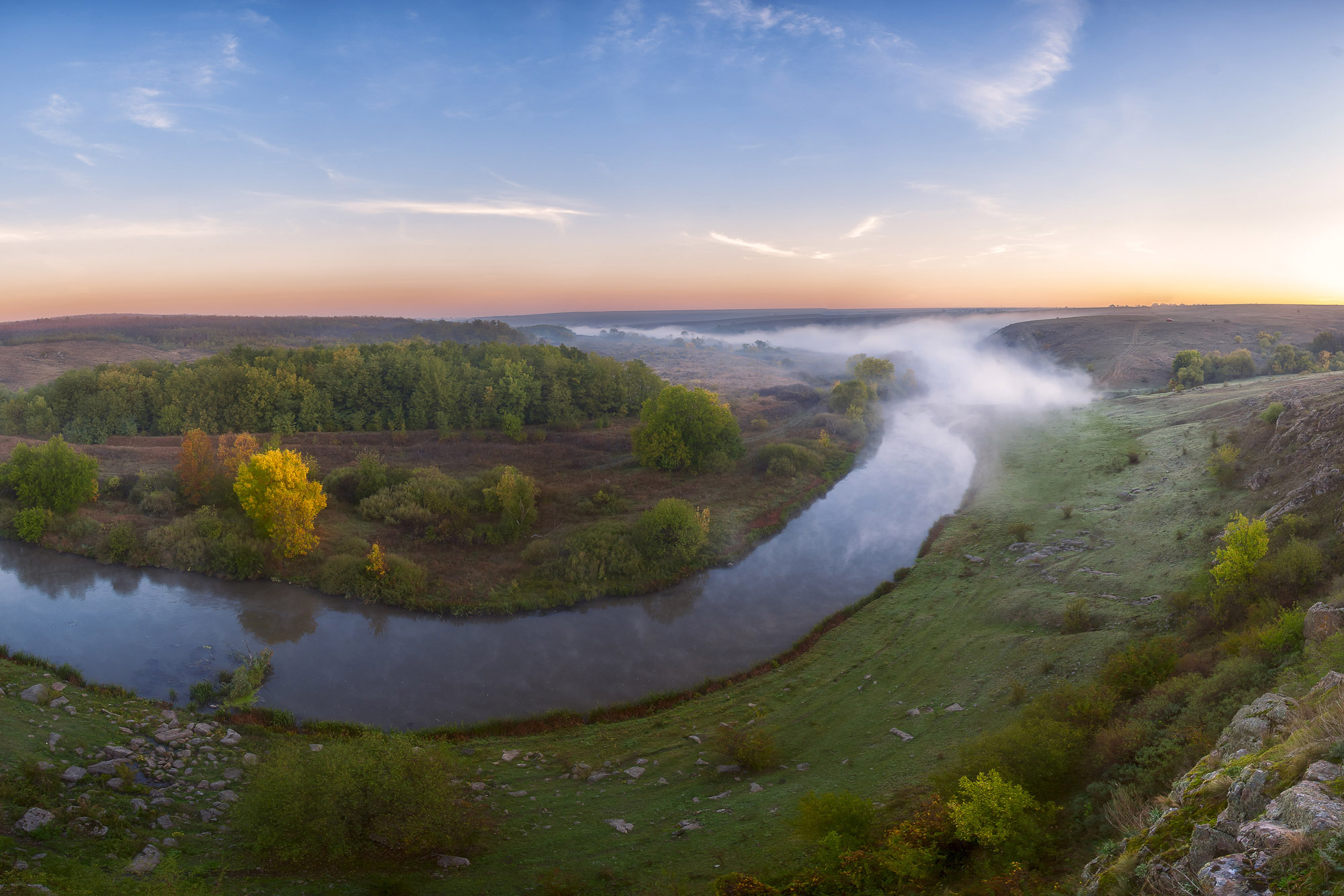
- Kalmius river

Location
- Country: Ukraine

Physical characteristics
- Source
  - location: Mineralne, Donetsk Oblast, Ukraine
  - coordinates: 48°05′41″N 37°51′42″E
- Mouth
  - location: Azov Sea (Mariupol)
  - coordinates: 47°05′14″N 37°34′29″E
- Length: 209 km (130 mi)
- Basin size: 5,070 km^{2} (1,960 sq mi)

The Kalmius (Ukrainian: Кальміус; Russian: Кальмиус) is a river flowing through Donetsk Oblast, Ukraine. Its source is near the Ukrainian city of Yasynuvata, and its mouth is in Mariupol. The Kalmius is one of two rivers flowing through Mariupol. The other is the Kalchyk, which flows into the Kalmius. The Kalmius flows into the Sea of Azov near the Azovstal Iron and Steel Works in Mariupol. Major cities along the Kalmius are Yasynuvata, Donetsk, Kalmiuske, and Mariupol.

== Geography ==
Kalmius crosses the Donets Ridge and Azov Upland. The river is non-navigable, but serves as a source of water for the southwestern part of Donbas. Its upper part is connected to the Donets via the Siverskyi Donets – Donbas Canal.

== History ==
Kalmius is said to be the name of a 16th-century Cossack encampment where the town of Pavlovsk was founded, later renamed Mariupol.

The Kalmius Trail was a Tatar raiding trail, one of the branches of the Muravsky Trail.

After an offensive by the separatist forces of the Donetsk People's Republic in August 2014 during the war in Donbas, in southern Donetsk Oblast, the river became the boundary between Donetsk People's Republic-controlled territory to the east, and Ukrainian government-controlled territory to the west. A Donetsk People's Republic unit was named the Kalmius Brigade after the river.

Under decommunization laws, the city of Komsomolske was renamed Kalmiuske in May 2016 after the river. However, the Ukrainian government does not control Kalmiuske, and the new name is not recognized by the pro-Russian occupation authorities.
