= Vesele, Donetsk Raion, Donetsk Oblast =

Vesele Веселе
- Village
- Interactive map of Vesele
- Location of Vesele within Ukraine Vesele (Ukraine)
- Coordinates: 48.062778°N 37.722222°E
- Country: Ukraine
- Oblast: Donetsk Oblast
- Raion: Donetsk Raion
- Hromada: Yasynuvata urban hromada
- Elevation: 213 m (699 ft)

Population (2001 census)
  - Total: 569
- Time zone: UTC+2 (EET)
  - Summer (DST): UTC+3 (EEST)
- Postal code: 86083
- Area code: +380 6236

Vesele (Ukrainian: Веселе; Russian: Весёлое) is a village in Donetsk Raion (district in Donetsk Oblast of Ukraine, at 9.2 km NW from the centre of Donetsk city. It is designated administratively as part of Yasynuvata urban hromada. The settlement borders from north with a runway of the former Donetsk airport.

== History ==
=== Russo-Ukrainian War ===
==== War in Donbas ====
The village was taken under control of pro-Russian forces during the War in Donbas, that started in 2014. During the Second Battle of Donetsk Airport this village was contested by the Ukrainian government, but DPR forces kept them back.

== Demographics ==
In 2001 the village had 569 inhabitants. Native language distribution as of the Ukrainian Census of 2001:

- Ukrainian: 54.4%
- Russian: 35.4%
- others: 0.7%
