= Trams in Avdiivka =

Avdiivka tram system
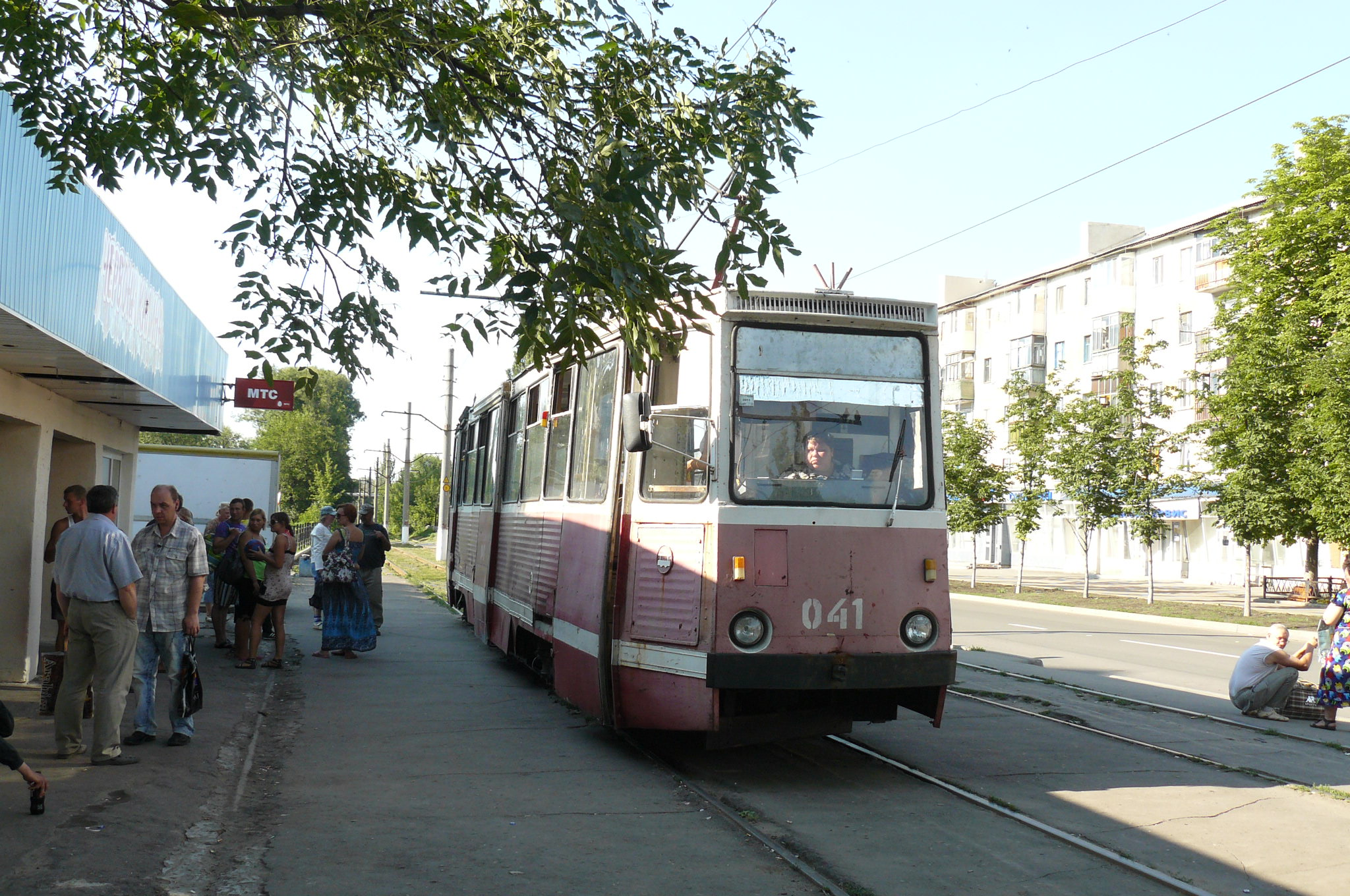

Operation
- Locale: Avdiivka, Ukraine
- Open: 23 August 1965
- Close: 2015 and again in 2017 (after partial reopening)
- Status: Service suspended indefinitely
- Routes: 2

Infrastructure
- Track gauge: 1,524 mm (5 ft)
- Propulsion system: 520-537 volts
- Depot: 1
- Stock: CLF-5

Statistics
- Route length: 24

The Avdiivka tram (Ukrainian: Авдіївський трамвай, romanized: Avdiivskyi tramvai) opened 23 August 1965. Due to the ongoing War in Donbas the transport system has not operated since 2015 despite attempts to restart operations, with the last such attempt being in 2017.

In 2010 it had 2 routes, 24.0 km and 25 rail cars. It used mainly multiple-unit tram consists, with an average of 3–4 cars per set.

== History ==
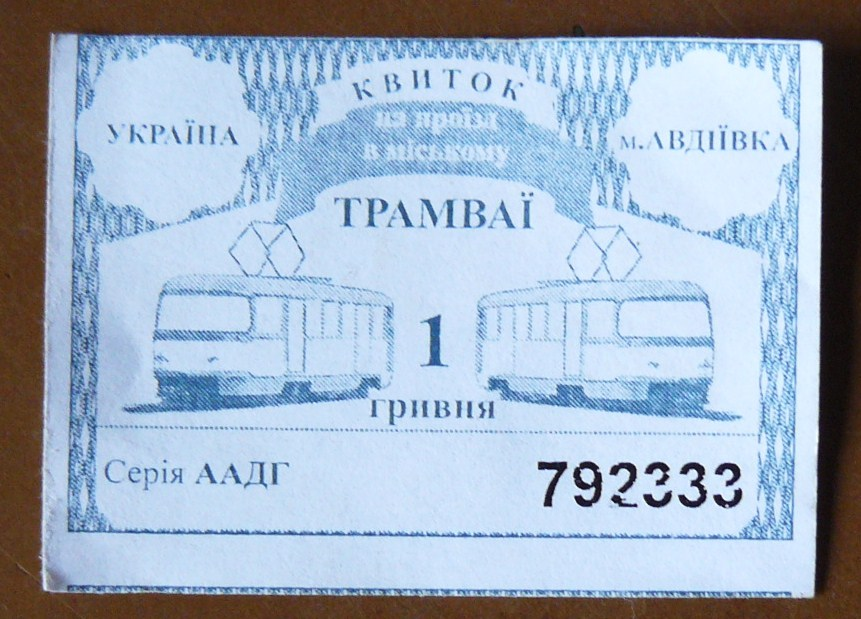
2012 Avdiivka tram ticket

The first section of the tram line opened 23 August 1965. It was opened to connect the city with the Avdiivka Coke Plant. Still in Ukraine no other tram line exists that was built to connect residential areas with a large industrial enterprise. The first stock used were the KTM/KTP-1 two-axle trams.

In 1969 and 1972 the line was further extended. In the early 1970s it was planned to extend the tram line to Donetsk, works to this end did start, but the project was never finished. In 1977 and 1978 the KTM-5 tram type replaced the KTM/KTP-1 type.

In 1986 the tram line was extended to the village Spartak, almost doubling the length of the line.

In 2003 tram traffic to Spartak was permanently suspended.

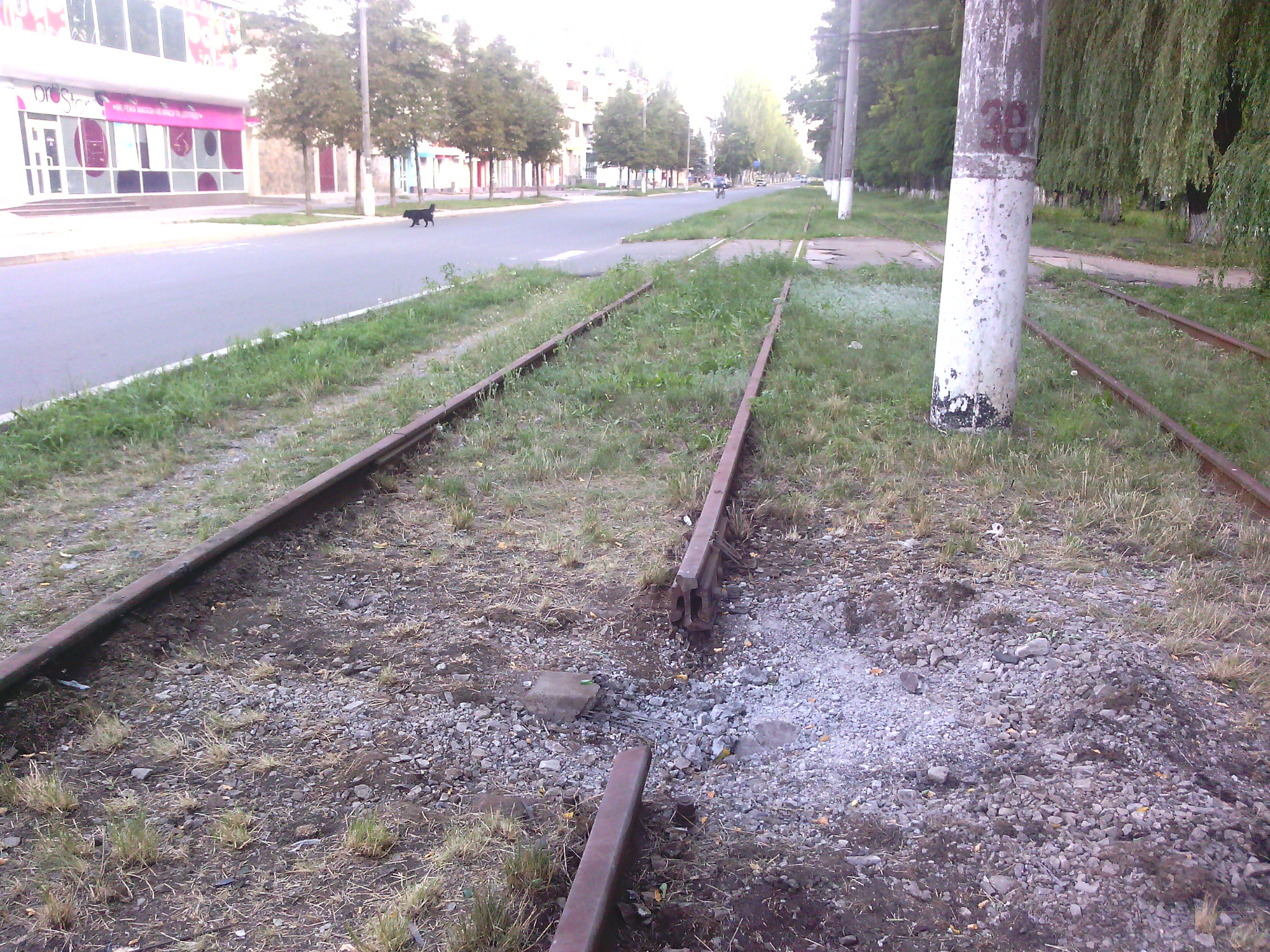
Destroyed section of rail in August 2015

Although Avdiivka was already suffering from the War in Donbas in June 2014 trams in Avdiivka continued to operate. After three trams were hit by artillery fire in January 2015 the tram line was completely dismantled. By late March 2015 tram traffic was completely stopped due to artillery bombardments and power failures. In 2016 a part of the tram line was reopened, but in January 2017 the tram line was permanently closed because of active fighting in Avdiivka. Currently the former tram line is served by a shuttle bus with the same number, "1". As of 2023, Avdiivka itself has been a frontline city for more than 9 years: thus it has been almost completely destroyed and most of its inhabitants have been evacuated. The shuttle service was used by workers to reach the Avdiivka Coke Plant until November 2023, when the Coke Plant was abandoned by last workers. On 17 February 2024, Ukrainian forces were completely withdrawing from Avdiivka. It can be assumed that all infrastructure in the city has been destroyed.
