= Yasynuvata =

City in Donetsk Oblast, Ukraine

Yasynuvata Ясинувата (Ukrainian)
- City
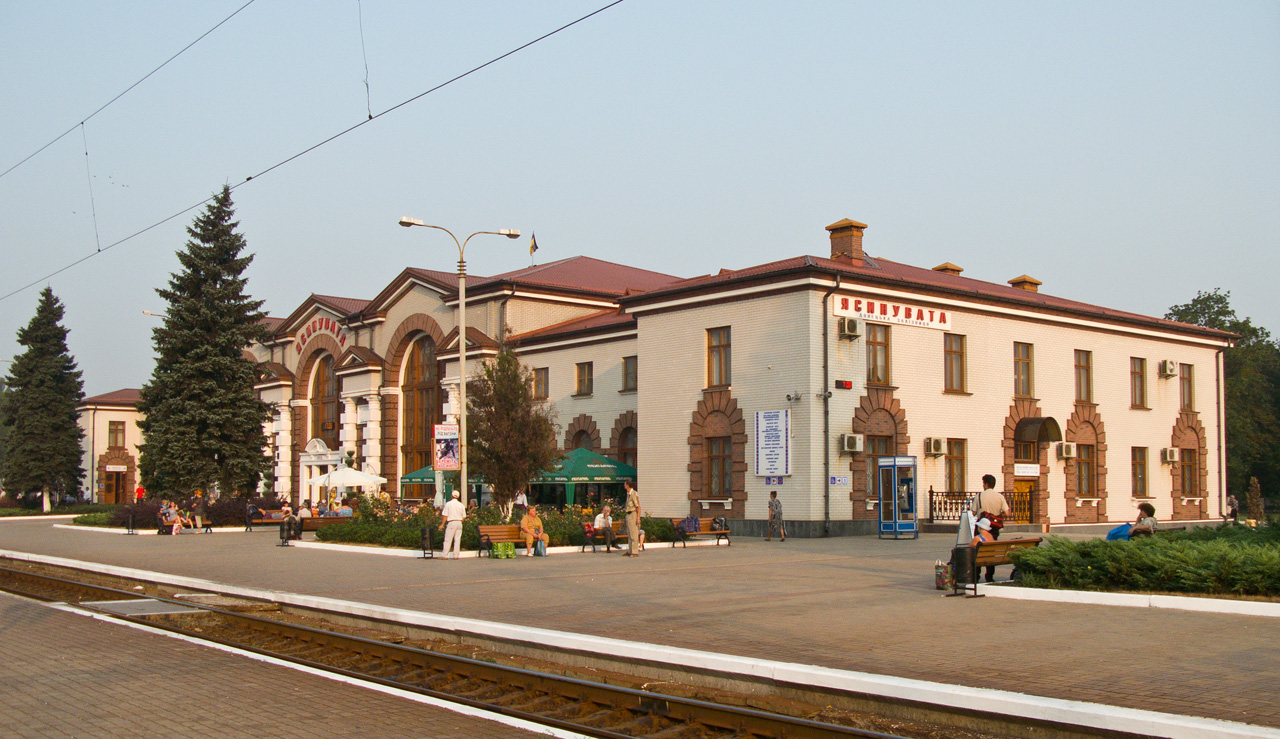

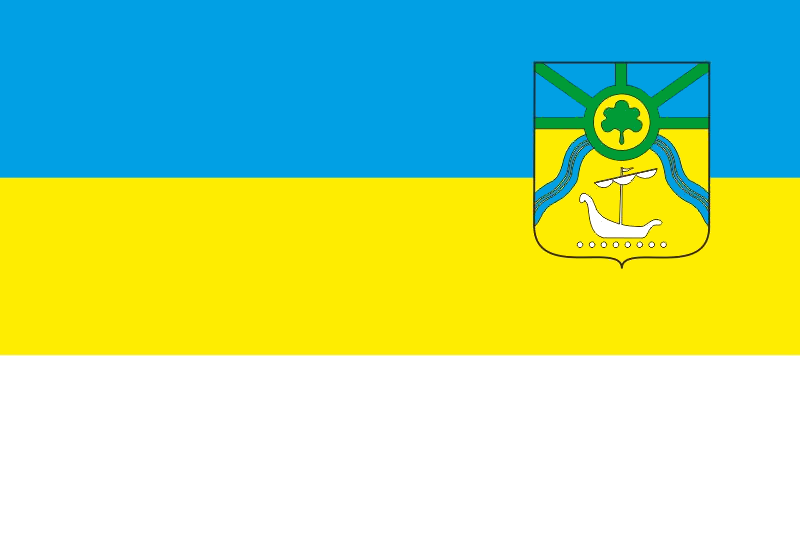
- Flag Coat of arms
- Interactive map of Yasynuvata
- Location of Yasynuvata Yasynuvata (Ukraine)
- Coordinates: 48°7′40″N 37°51′45″E
- Country: Ukraine
- Oblast: Donetsk Oblast
- Raion: Donetsk Raion
- Hromada: Yasynuvata urban hromada
- Founded: 1872
- City status: 1936

Area
  - Total: 19 km^{2} (7.3 sq mi)
- Elevation: 257 m (843 ft)

Population (2022)
  - Total: 34,144
  - Density: 1,800/km^{2} (4,700/sq mi)
- Postal code: 86000—86015
- Area code: +380-6236
- Climate: Warm summer subtype

Yasynuvata (Ukrainian: Ясинувата, pronounced [jɐsɪnʊˈwɑtɐ]; Russian: Ясиноватая, romanized: Yasinovataya, pronounced [jɪsʲɪnɐˈvatəjə]) is a city in Donetsk Oblast, eastern Ukraine. It was incorporated as a city of oblast significance until the 2020 administrative reform. It also served as the administrative center of Yasynuvata Raion until it was dissolved in 2020. It is located 21 kilometres (13 mi) from Donetsk, the administrative center of the oblast. Yasynuvata is a large railway crossroad. Its population is approximately 34,144 (2022 estimate).

== History ==
Starting mid-April 2014 pro-Russian separatists captured several towns and cities across in Donetsk and Luhansk Districts; including Yasynuvata. On 17 August 2014, Ukrainian forces reportedly took the city from the pro-Russian separatists. But fighting for control of the city continued. On 19 August Ukrainian troops claimed they were clearing Yasynuvata of remaining separatist forces after its victory ("conducting a mopping-up operation"). Ukrainian military was forced to retreat from the town in mid-September 2014, and since then the government of Ukraine has recognised it to be under Russian occupation.

Due to the war situation railway operation has ceased in 2014.

In 2016 the OSCE declared the area between Yasynuvata and neighboring Ukrainian army controlled Avdiivka to be one of the hotspots of the War in Donbass.

On 30 September 2022, the Russian Federation unilaterally annexed Yasynuvata with other areas of Donetsk Oblast that are under Russian military occupation.

== Demographics ==
As of the 2001 Ukrainian census:

Ethnicity

Ethnic groups in Yasynuvata
	percent
Ukrainians	68.9%
Russians	28.7%
Belarusians	0.6%
Armenians	0.4%

== Notable people ==
- Mykola Skrypnyk
- Iryna Dovhan
- Mykola Hrytsenko
