= Passportization =

Mass conferral of citizenship by distributing passports

Passportization is defined as the mass conferral of citizenship to the population of a particular territory by distributing passports, generally within a relatively short period. This policy has been primarily used by Russian authorities who have provided easy access for persons born on the territory, sometimes holders of former Soviet passports, to apply for citizenship. In particular, the requirement of five years' residence on both Russian and Ukrainian territories is waived for former citizens of the Soviet Union.

== Georgia ==
In Georgia this occurred in South Ossetia and Abkhazia, where residents continued to be citizens of the Soviet Union and kept Soviet passports even a decade after the breakup of the Soviet Union. In 2002, a new Citizenship Law of Russia simplified acquisition of citizenship for any citizen of the Soviet Union, regardless of their current place of residence. In Abkhazia and South Ossetia, Russian nationalist non-governmental organizations such as the Congress of Russian Communities of Abkhazia carried papers to a nearby Russian city for processing so that residents did not need to travel to obtain Russian citizenship. By June 25, 2002, approximately 150,000 Abkhazians had gained Russian citizenship in addition to the 50,000 who already possessed it, with the blessing of authorities in Sokhumi. The Georgian Foreign Ministry denounced the passport allocation as an “unprecedented illegal campaign”. On February 1, 2011, Soviet passports were no longer considered valid for crossing the Russian-Abkhaz border.

In April 2009, the OSCE High Commissioner on National Minorities stated there was "pressure being exercised on the Georgian population in the Gali District through the limitation of their education rights, compulsory "passportization", forced conscription into the Abkhaz military forces and restrictions on their freedom of movement." An effort to force ethnic Georgians in Abkhazia to take on Abkhaz citizenship was rebuffed in 2009.

== Ukraine ==
Russia has been naturalizing people in the Ukrainian regions of Donetsk and Luhansk on a large scale since 2019. This became possible after Art. 29 para. 1.1 Russian Citizenship Act was inserted by law of 27 December 2018. This provision empowers the Russian President to establish categories of foreign citizens and stateless persons eligible to apply for Russian citizenship under the simplified procedure. By Decree No. 183 of 24 April 2019, residents of the Donetsk and Luhansk regions became eligible accordingly.

During the Russo-Ukrainian war, Ukrainians were subjected to forced passportization in the occupied parts of the Kherson and Zaporizhzhia oblasts.
