= Kashtanove =

Kashtanove Каштанове
- Rural settlement
- Location of Kashtanove within Ukraine Kashtanove (Ukraine)
- Coordinates: 48.123056°N 37.824444°E
- Country: Ukraine
- Oblast: Donetsk Oblast
- Raion: Donetsk Raion
- Hromada: Yasynuvata urban hromada
- Elevation: 236 m (774 ft)

Population (2001 census)
  - Total: 58
- Time zone: UTC+2 (EET)
  - Summer (DST): UTC+3 (EEST)
- Postal code: 86005
- Area code: +380 6236

Kashtanove (Ukrainian: Каштанове; Russian: Каштановое) is a rural settlement in Yasynuvata urban hromada, Donetsk Raion (district in Donetsk Oblast of Ukraine, at 16.2 km NNE from the centre of Donetsk city.

The settlement was taken under control of pro-Russian forces during the War in Donbass, that started in 2014.

== Demographics ==
In 2001 the settlement had 58 inhabitants. Native language distribution as of the Ukrainian Census of 2001:

- Ukrainian: 36.21%
- Russian: 63.79%
