= Vasylivka, Pokrovsk Raion, Donetsk Oblast =

Vasylivka Василівка
- Village
- Interactive map of Vasylivka
- Location in Donetsk Oblast Location in Ukraine
- Coordinates: 48.177°N 37.863°E
- Country: Ukraine
- Oblast: Donetsk Oblast
- District: Pokrovsk Raion
- Elevation: 150 m (490 ft)

Population (2001 census)
  - Total: 371
- Time zone: UTC+2 (EET)
  - Summer (DST): UTC+3 (EEST)
- Postal code: 86198
- Area code: +380 6236

Vasylivka (Ukrainian: Василівка; Russian: Василевка) is a village in Pokrovsk Raion (district) in Donetsk Oblast of eastern Ukraine, 22.2 km (13.8 mi) north-northeast from the centre of Donetsk city.

The settlement was taken under control of pro-Russian forces (the DPR) during the War in Donbass, that started in 2014.

== Demographics ==
In 2001, the settlement had 371 inhabitants. Native language distribution as of the Ukrainian Census of 2001:

- Ukrainian: 29.92%
- Russian: 70.08%
