= Mineralne =

Mineralne Мінеральне
- Rural settlement
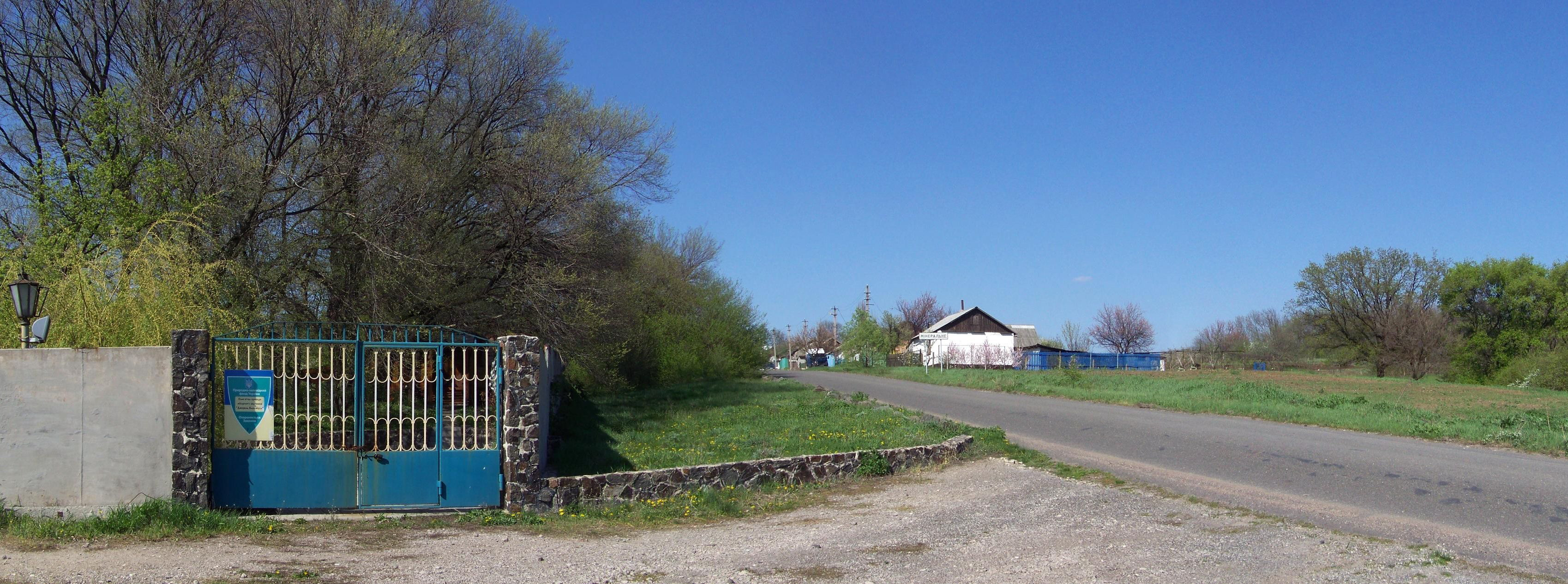

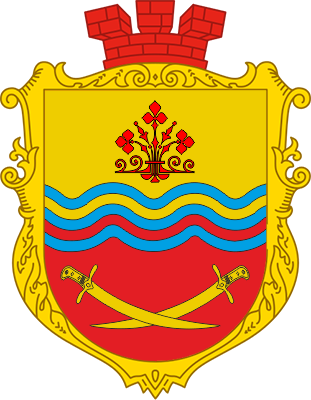
- Coat of arms

- Location of Azov within Ukraine Mineralne (Ukraine)
- Coordinates: 48.101389°N 37.831389°E
- Country: Ukraine
- Oblast: Donetsk Oblast
- Raion: Donetsk Raion
- Hromada: Yasynuvata urban hromada
- Elevation: 224 m (735 ft)

Population (2001 census)
  - Total: 405
- Time zone: UTC+2 (EET)
  - Summer (DST): UTC+3 (EEST)
- Postal code: 86004, 86198
- Area code: +380 6236

Mineralne (Ukrainian: Мінеральне; Russian: Минеральное) is a rural settlement in Yasynuvata urban hromada, Donetsk Raion (district in Donetsk Oblast of Ukraine, at 11.3 km NNE from the centre of Donetsk city, on the right bank of the Kalmius river.

== History ==
=== War in Donbas ===
The settlement was taken under control of pro-Russian forces during the war in Donbas, that started in 2014.

== Demographics ==
The settlement had 405 inhabitants in 2001; native language distribution as of the Ukrainian Census of 2001:

- Ukrainian: 54.81%
- Russian: 44.69%
- Armenian: 0.5%
