= Yasynuvata Raion =

Former subdivision of Donetsk Oblast, Ukraine, in use by the Donetsk People's Republic

Yasynuvata Raion Ясинуватський район
- Raion
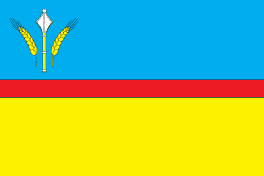
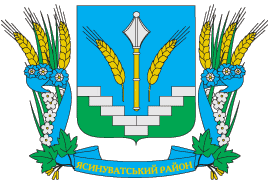
- Flag Coat of arms

- Coordinates: 47°14′46.5″N 37°36′55.5″E
- Country: Ukraine
- Oblast: Donetsk Oblast
- Disestablished: 2020
- Admin. center: Yasynuvata (de jure); Ocheretyne (de facto)
- Subdivisions: List: 0 — city councils; 3 — settlement councils; 9 — rural councils; Number of localities: 0 — cities; 3 — urban-type settlements; 30 — villages; 13 — rural settlements

Government
  - Governor: Dmytro Dyzchenko

Area
  - Total: 809 km^{2} (312 sq mi)

Population (2020)
  - Total: 25,942 ▼
  - Density: 32.1/km^{2} (83.1/sq mi)
- Time zone: UTC+02:00 (EET)
  - Summer (DST): UTC+03:00 (EEST)
- Postal index: 86000-86092
- Area code: +380 6236

Yasynuvata Raion (Ukrainian: Ясинуватський район, romanized: Yasynuvats'kyi raion) was one of the administrative raions (a district) of Donetsk Oblast, located in southeastern Ukraine. The administrative center of the district was the city of Yasynuvata, which was incorporated separately as a city of oblast significance and did not belong to the districts jurisdiction.

Beginning in 2014, with the onset of the War in Donbas, the raion was split: The western part was under control of the central Ukrainian government, whereas its eastern part was under control of the Donetsk People's Republic.

The raion was abolished by the Ukrainian government on 18 July 2020 as part of the administrative reform of Ukraine, which reduced the number of raions of Donetsk Oblast to eight, of which only five were controlled by the government. The area of Yasynuvata Raion was partitioned with government-controlled areas were merged into Kramatorsk Raion and Pokrovsk Raion, and separatist-controlled areas being merged into Donetsk Raion. The last estimate of the raion population, reported by the Ukrainian government, was 25,942 (2020 est.).

== History ==
On 9 December 2014, following the events surrounding the War in Donbas, the Verkhovna Rada, Ukraine's national parliament, moved Yasynuvata Raion's administration buildings and government to вул. Першотравнева 12, (English: 12 May Day Street) in the urban-type settlement of Ocheretyne, which is near H 20 about 35 km north-northwest of Donetsk. The raion (as under control by Ukrainian authorities) was located 20 kilometers from the frontline of the War in Donbas.

The city of Yasynuvata was under the control of the Russian-backed Donetsk People's Republic. In early February 2016, the separatist Pavel Gubarev was appointed as mayor of Yasynuvata Raion in the breakaway region.

== Demographics ==
National composition of the population in the district according to the 2001 Ukrainian Census.

Ethnicity	Number	Percent
Ukrainians	21,009	69.3%
Russians	8,295	27.4%
Belarusians	300	1.0%

== See also ==
- Mineralne
