= Racism in the Soviet Union =

Despite officially condemning nationalism and proclaiming internationalism, the Soviet Union in practice significantly marginalized and discriminated against people of certain ethnic groups designated as "enemies of the people", pushed their assimilation, and promoted chauvinistic Russian nationalistic and settler-colonialist activities in their lands. The USSR used the term "nation" to refer to ethnic or national communities and or ethnic groups., and claimed to be supportive of the self-determination and rights of minorities and colonized peoples. However, in practice it significantly marginalized people of certain ethnic groups. Whereas Vladimir Lenin had supported and implemented policies of korenizatsiia (integration of non-Russian nationalities into the governments of their specific Soviet republics), Joseph Stalin reversed much of the previous policies, signing orders to deport and exile ethnic-linguistic groups branded as "traitors to the Fatherland", including the Balkars, Crimean Tatars, Chechens, Ingush, Karachays, Kalmyks, Koreans and Meskhetian Turks, with those who survived the collective deportation to Siberia or Central Asia legally designated "special settlers", meaning that they were officially second-class citizens with few rights and were confined within small perimeters.

After the death of Stalin, Nikita Khrushchev criticized the deportations based on ethnicity in a secret section of his report to the 20th Congress of the Communist Party of the Soviet Union, describing them as "rude violations of the basic Leninist principles of the nationality policy of the Soviet state". Soon thereafter, in the mid- to late 1950s, some deported peoples were fully rehabilitated, having been allowed the full right of return, and their national republics were restored — except for the Koreans, Crimean Tatars, and Meskhetian Turks, who were not granted the right of return and were instead forced to stay in Central Asia. The government subsequently took a variety of measures to prevent such deported peoples from returning to their native villages, ranging from denying residence permits to people of certain ethnic groups in specific areas, referring to people by incorrect ethnonyms to minimize ties to their homeland (e.g., "Tatars that formerly resided in Crimea" instead of "Crimean Tatars"), arresting protesters for requesting the right of return and spreading racist propaganda demonizing ethnic minorities.

== Northern and Eastern Asians ==
=== Koreans ===
Deportation of Koreans in the Soviet Union, originally conceived in 1926, initiated in 1930, and carried through in 1937, was the first mass transfer of an entire nationality in the Soviet Union. Almost the entire Soviet population of ethnic Koreans (171,781 persons) were forcefully moved from the Russian Far East to unpopulated areas of the Kazakh SSR and the Uzbek SSR in October 1937. Before the deportation, three articles were published in the state organ Pravda, claiming that Buddhists organized Japanese sabotage, and claiming that a list of occupations that were widely worked in by Chinese and Koreans in the Soviet Union, were agents of Japan, it is however, generally believed these were manipulated. The justification for deportation resolution 1428-326cc was that it had been planned with the aim to prevent the infiltration of Japanese spies to the Far East. However, no conclusive documents or other information on the matter have been found.

Despite the Soviet Union accusing the Koreans of being "Japanese proxies", the Soviet Union would sign a 1925 Convention with Imperial Japan, granting it "most favoured nation" status, granting the Empire extensive timber and fishing rights, and later providing the Empire with oil and coal concessions inside the Soviet Union that were expanded as late as 1939. and lasted until 1943. After the deportation to Central Asia, some two thousand Soviet Koreans (or more) remained on northern Sakhalin for the expressed purpose of working on the Soviet-Japanese concessions (ie. joint-ventures). Some argue this act completely refutes the rationale for the deportation of Koreans to prevent the infiltration of Japanese espionage, it is also believed it cannot be used to argue Japanese xenophobia for ideologic reasons, of scholars such as Terry Martin. Ironically, the Soviet Koreans found themselves working alongside Japanese laborers and managers because of their government's economic policies and need for hard currency (the 1925 Convention). The number of Japanese laborers was typically from 700 to 1500, but sometimes more. Additionally, a large number of the "Japanese" laborers were in fact, Korean Koreans (northern and southern regions). The koreans had been put in servitude of both the Japanese and the Soviets as it was Japan's responsibility (per the 1925 Soviet-Japanese Convention) to manage and pay the salaries of the laborers and the managers. The USSR needed only to supply the resources. Japan was to divide the earnings typically 50-50 with the USSR and to pay the USSR in cash and sometimes in gold bullion.

Historian Jon K. Chang described major Tsarist continuities in chauvinism and views on race. The USSR's policy towards Koreans demonstrated a widespread belief in primordialism—the idea that ethnic groups were permanent, ancient and unassimilable—which contributed to Soviet bureaucracy's paranoia on perceived disloyal nationalities. The writings of Lev Shternberg and Vladimir Arsenev, two of the leading ethnographers in the early Soviet Union, showed their belief in "biological" nationality, a refusal to believe linguistic assimilation or religious conversion, and tropes of "yellow peril" where Koreans were conflated with Japan and perceived as conspiring or having questionable loyalty. The leadership of the Soviet Far East had already adopted a resolution in 1923 suggesting resettling Koreans away from the border, but this initial proposal had been rejected by Moscow and did not yet culminate in the mass-scale deportation later, although a deportation of 600-800 Korean workers to Japan occurred that year. In 1928, Arsenev's report for Dalkraikom claimed that the Chinese, Japanese, and Korean workers were "predators" against Russians. Even as tsarist-era writers became less prominent in the Soviet Union, the belief in primordialism would continue through passportisation and Stalinist deportations of ethnicities, being expressed most overtly from the 1930s.

=== Chinese ===
The Soviet regime performed mass arrests and deportations on people of Chinese descent. By the 1930s about 24,600 Chinese lived in the Russian Far East, and were targeted by Soviet policies that became increasingly repressive against diaspora nationalities, leading to deportation and exile. A major Chinese community in the Soviet Union was in Millionka in Vladivostok. In 1936 after the NKVD identified 12 Chinese who were claimed to be spies for Japan, 4,202 Chinese residents of Vladivostok were deported, and many others were arrested. The NKVD official responsible said that "As of today Big and Little 'Millionka' no longer exist". On 22 December 1937, Nikolai Yezhov ordered the NKVD to “arrest all Chinese, regardless of their citizenship, who are engaged in provocative activities or have terrorist intentions.” Over the following year, 11,198 Chinese residents in the Russian Far East were exiled to other areas of the Soviet Union, such as Kazakhstan, or deported to China.

The Chinese and Korean deportations in 1937-38 and 1937 respectively were carried out to stop "the further penetration of Japanese espionage." The two East Asian groups were labelled as "not sufficiently Sovietized," potential fifth columnists, vectors of foreign influence and espionage and the Soviet xenophobia theory stating that the "ethnic cleansing was never racial and always ideological, that these deported peoples possessed or represented political ideologies inimical to Soviet socialism." It is however argued that the continued use of hundreds of East Asian from 1937 to 1945, in Soviet intelligence disproves this

=== Kalmyks ===
The deportations of 1943, codenamed Operation Ulussy, were the deportation of most people of the Kalmyk nationality in the Soviet Union, and Russian women married to Kalmyks, except Kalmyk women married to another nationality. The Kalmyk people had been accused of collaboration with the Nazis as a whole. The decision was made in December 1943, when NKVD agents entered the homes of Kalmyks, or registered the names of those absent for deportation later, and packed them into cargo wagons and transported them to various locations in Siberia: Altai Krai, Krasnoyarsk Krai, Omsk Oblast, and Novosibirsk Oblast. Around half of (97,000–98,000) Kalmyk people deported to Siberia died before being allowed to return home in 1957.

Under the Law of the Russian Federation of 26 April 1991 "On the Rehabilitation of Repressed Peoples" repressions against Kalmyks and other peoples were qualified as an act of genocide. Article 4 of this law provided that any propaganda impeding rehabilitation of peoples is prohibited, and persons responsible for such propaganda are subject to prosecution.

== Eastern Europeans ==
=== Crimean Tatars ===
The forcible deportation of the Crimean Tatars from Crimea was ordered by Stalin in 1944 and constituted a form of ethnic cleansing of the region as collective punishment for alleged collaboration with the Nazi occupation regime in Taurida Subdistrict during 1942–1943. A total of more than 230,000 people were deported, mostly to the Uzbek SSR. This included the entire ethnic Crimean Tatar population, at the time about a fifth of the total population of the Crimean Peninsula, and was applied to some other ethnicities in Crimea including ethnic Greeks and Bulgarians. A large number of deportees (more than 100,000 according to a 1960s survey by Crimean Tatar activists) died from starvation or disease as a direct result of deportation. It is considered to be a case of illegal ethnic cleansing by the Russian government and genocide by Ukraine. During and after the deportation, the Soviet government dispatched spokespersons to spread anti-Tatar propaganda throughout destinations of deportation and Crimea, slandering them as bandits and depicting them as barbarians, going so far as to hold a conference dedicated to remembering the "struggle against Tatar bourgeoisie nationalists". Depicting the Crimean Tatar people as "Mongols" with no historical connection to Crimea in official state propaganda became an important aspect of attempts to legitimize the deportation of Crimean Tatars and the Slavic settler-colonialism of the peninsula. While most deported ethnic groups were allowed to return to their homelands in the 1950s, a vast majority of Crimean Tatars were forced to remain in exile under the household registration system until 1989. During that period, Slavs from Ukraine and Russia were encouraged to repopulate the peninsula and a vast majority of toponyms with Crimean Tatar names were given Slavic names in the subsequent detatarization campaign.

=== Cossacks ===
The Soviet Union enacted a campaign of decossackization to end the existence of Cossacks, a social and ethnic group in Russia. Many authors characterize decossackization as genocide of the Cossacks.

=== Poles ===
After the Polish–Soviet War (1920–1920) theater of the Russian Civil War and the failed Soviet conquest of Poland, Poles were often persecuted by the Soviet Union. In 1937, NKVD Order No. 00485 enacted the beginning of the Polish repressions. The order aimed at the arrest of "absolutely all Poles" and confirmed that "the Poles should be completely destroyed". Member of the NKVD Administration for the Moscow District, Aron Postel explained that although there was no word-for-word quote of "all Poles" in the actual Order, that was exactly how the letter was to be interpreted by the NKVD executioners. By official Soviet documentation, some 139,815 people were sentenced under the aegis of the anti-Polish operation of the NKVD, and condemned without judicial trial of any kind whatsoever, including 111,071 sentenced to death and executed in short order.

The Operation was only a peak in the persecution of the Poles, which spanned more than a decade. As the Soviet statistics indicate, the number of ethnic Poles in the USSR dropped by 165,000 in that period. "It is estimated that Polish losses in the Ukrainian SSR were about 30%, while in the Belorussian SSR... the Polish minority was almost completely annihilated." Historian Michael Ellman asserts that the "national operations", particularly the "Polish operation", may constitute genocide as defined by the UN convention. His opinion is shared by Simon Sebag Montefiore, who calls the Polish operation of the NKVD "a mini-genocide". Polish writer and commentator, Dr Tomasz Sommer, also refers to the operation as a genocide, along with Prof. Marek Jan Chodakiewicz among others.

After the Soviet invasion of Poland in 1939, the Soviet Union began to repress institutions of the former Polish government, although these repressions were not overtly racist the new Soviet government allowed for racial hatred. The Soviets exploited past ethnic tensions between Poles and other ethnic groups living in Poland; they incited and encouraged violence against Poles, suggesting the minorities could "rectify the wrongs they had suffered during twenty years of Polish rule". Pre-war Poland was portrayed as a capitalist state based on exploitation of the working people and ethnic minorities. Soviet publications claimed that the unfair treatment of non-Poles by the Second Polish Republic justified its dismemberment.

=== NKVD national operations ===
Other ethnic mass deportations performed by the NKVD included the Greek Operation, German Operation, Latvian Operation, Korean Operation, Estonian Operation, and others.

NKVD Order No. 00439, also known as the “German operation of the NKVD”, commanded to arrest citizens of Germany, as well as former German citizens who assumed the Soviet citizenship, in 1937–1938. German citizens who worked at railways and defense enterprises were qualified as "penetrated agents of the German General Staff and Gestapo", ready for diversion activity "during the war period" (N.B.: the war was considered imminent).

Russian historian Andrei Savin found points largely corroborating the theory of "ethnification of Stalinism" stating that Stalin's policy shifted away from internationalism towards National Bolshevism. Savin connected 1920s persecutions of Germans in the Soviet Union to that of other nationalities such as Koreans, Poles, Latvians, Finns, Chinese, Greeks, and others. He stated that "long before Nazism came to power and the problem of a military threat emerged, the top leaders of the secret police of the USSR had already formulated the view of the German Diaspora as being a spy and sabotage base" starting as early as 1924, and focusing on the long standing Volga German minority. Locations with large diaspora populations of various nationalities were more closely watched by intelligence, preceding the national operations of the NKVD, as well as intermittent 1934-1935 persecutions. The German operation of 1937-1938 like other mass deportations of ethnicities in the USSR, had aspects of social cleansing. Savin argued it was difficult to extend this to a classification of ethnic cleansing, but the Great Terror included both "traditional" ethnic repression and elements of "class-based dogma".

== Transcaucasians ==
=== Nakh peoples ===
Two ethnic groups that were specifically targeted for persecution in the Stalin era were the Chechens and the Ingush. Soviet media accused the two ethnic groups of having cultures which did not fit in with Soviet culture – such as accusing Chechens of being associated with "banditism" – and the authorities claimed that the Soviet Union had to intervene in order to "remake" and "reform" these cultures. In practice, this meant heavily armed punitive operations carried out against Chechen "bandits" that failed to achieve forced assimilation, culminating in an ethnic cleansing operation in 1944, which involved the arrests and deportation of over 500,000 Chechens and Ingush from the Caucasus to Central Asia and the Kazakh SSR. The deportations of the Chechens and Ingush also involved the outright massacre of thousands of people, and severe conditions placed upon the deportees – they were put in unsealed train cars, with little to no food for a four-week journey during which many died from hunger and exhaustion. Like all other deported peoples, they were subject to the special settler regime upon arrival, significantly reducing their rights and making them second-class citizens. In addition to heavy restrictions from special settler status, they were targeted with pogroms in exile; although they were rehabilitated and permitted full right of return in the 1950's, they still faced strong discrimination from being brandished as an "enemy people" and having formerly been special settlers. Famous cases of discrimination include the attempt of Lyalya Nasukhanova (the first Chechen woman pilot) to join the cosmonaut program — but was rejected every time she applied because she was a Chechen.

=== Meskhetian Turks ===
Meskhetian Turks are a Turkic people who originally inhabited Georgia before their internal exile by the Soviet Union. During the deportation, over 90,000 Meskhetian Turks were forcibly exiled to the Uzbek Soviet Socialist Republic. Members of other ethnic groups were also deported during the operation, including Kurds and Hemshils (Armenian Muslims), bringing the total to approximately 150,000 evicted people. On 31 July 1944, the Soviet State Defense Committee decree N 6277ss stated: "... in order to defend Georgia's state border and the state border of the USSR we are preparing to relocate Turks, Kurds and Hemshils from the border strip". The Meskhetian Turks were one of the six ethnic groups from the Caucasus who were deported in 1943 and 1944 in their entirety by the Soviet secret police—the other five were the Chechens, the Ingush, the Balkars, the Karachays and the Kalmyks.

Later in 1989, anti-Meskhetian riots occurred in Soviet Uzbekistan and Kyrgyzstan. The ethnic violence ultimately led to 60,000 Meskhetian Turks fleeing from Uzbekistan for other areas of the former Soviet Union.

=== Armenians and Azerbaijanis ===
In the 1930s, Armenian refugees who survived the Armenian Genocide in the Ottoman Empire developed cultural and linguistic continuities, "Ergir", with their exiled homeland as they developed communities in the Soviet Union. This was initially allowed to develop during korenizatsiya or local nationalities toleration. Stalin reversed this "tolerance for local nationalisms of the non-Russian Soviet nations in the late 1930s", according to Korkmaz, "He set a new political tone all over the Soviet Union that endorsed linguistic Russification, Russian chauvinism, or what David Brandenberger calls ‘Russo-centric etatism’" coinciding with purges in Soviet Armenia, involving imprisonment, executions and internal exile for perceived "bourgeois nationalism". According to migration historian Korkmaz, in the post-Stalin era, displaced Armenians "drew parallels between the two trajectories of Armenian suffering in the twentieth century: the Armenian genocide and the Stalinist purges."

In 1944–1949, Stalin further deported about 157,000 people from the South Caucasus, including Armenians and Azerbaijanis, and initiated a deportation of Azerbaijanis from Armenia from 1947–1950.

Ethnic tension between Armenians and Azerbaijanis can be traced back to the pre-Soviet Armenian–Azerbaijani War. The deportation of Azerbaijanis from Armenia ensued as an act of forced resettlement and ethnic cleansing throughout the 20th century. As a result of Armenian-Azerbaijani interethnic conflict in the beginning of the 20th century, as well as Armenian and Azerbaijani nationalists' coordinated policy of ethnic cleansing, a substantial portion of the Armenian and Azerbaijani population was driven out from the territory of both Armenia and Azerbaijan. According to the Russian census of 1897, the town Erivan had 29,006 residents: 12,523 of them were Armenians and 12,359 were Azerbaijanis. As outlined in the Brockhaus and Efron Encyclopedic Dictionary, Azerbaijanis (Tatars) made up 12,000 people (41%) of the 29,000 people in the city. However, during the systematic ethnic cleansings in the Soviet era and the systematic deportation of Armenians from Persia and the Ottoman Empire during the Armenian genocide, the capital of present-day Armenia became a largely homogenous city. According to the census of 1959, Armenians made up 96% population of the country and in 1989 more than 96,5%. Azerbaijanis then made up only 0,1% of Yerevan's population. They changed Yerevan's population in favor of the Armenians by sidelining the local Muslim population. As a result of the Nagorno-Karabakh conflict, not only were the Azerbaijanis of Yerevan driven away, but the Azerbaijani mosque in Yerevan was also demolished.

In the late 1980s and early 1990s, the First Nagorno-Karabakh War broke out between the Soviet republics of Armenia and Azerbaijan. During the war, many anti-Armenian pogroms broke out. The first was the Sumgait pogrom in which citizens attacked Armenian citizens for three days. Other anti-Armenian pogroms followed such as the Kirovabad pogrom, and Baku pogrom.

== Jews ==
The October Revolution inspired the Bolsheviks to seize power in a coup. They strongly opposed Judaism (as well as other religions) and as a result, they conducted an extensive campaign to suppress the religious traditions of the Jewish population, along with traditional Jewish culture. In 1918, the Yevsektsiya was established to promote Marxism, secularism, and Jewish assimilation into Soviet society, and supposedly bringing communism to the Jewish masses.

In August 1919, Jewish properties, including synagogues, were seized by the Soviet government and many Jewish communities were dissolved. The anti-religious laws against all expressions of religion and religious education were being taken out on all religious groups, including the Jewish communities. Many rabbis and other religious officials were forced to resign from their posts under the threat of violent persecution. This type of persecution continued on into the 1920s.

Joseph Stalin emerged as dictator of the Soviet Union following a power struggle with Leon Trotsky after Lenin's death. Stalin has been accused of resorting to antisemitism in some of his arguments against Trotsky, who was a Russian of Jewish descent. Those who knew Stalin, such as Nikita Khrushchev, suggested that throughout his life, Stalin had harbored negative attitudes towards Jews and they also suggested that Stalin had manifested these sentiments before the 1917 Revolution. As early as 1907, Stalin wrote a letter differentiating between a "Jewish faction" and a "true Russian faction" in Bolshevism. Stalin's secretary Boris Bazhanov stated that Stalin made crude antisemitic outbursts even before Lenin's death. Stalin adopted antisemitic policies which were reinforced with his anti-Westernism. (Note: Konstantin Azadovskii, an editorial board member of the cultural journal Novoe literaturnoe obozrenie, and Boris Egorov, a research fellow at Saint Petersburg State University, in an article titled From Anti-Westernism to Anti-Semitism published in the Journal of Cold War Studies writes "Stalin's policies of anti- Westernism and anti-Semitism reinforced one another and joined together in the notion of cosmopolitanism.") Antisemitism, as historian, Orientalist and anthropologist Raphael Patai and geneticist Jennifer Patai Wing put it in their book The Myth of the Jewish Race, was "couched in the language of opposition to Zionism". Since 1936, in the show trial of "Trotskyite-Zinovievite Terrorist Center", the suspects, prominent Bolshevik leaders, were accused of hiding their Jewish origins under Slavic names.

After World War II, antisemitism was openly escalated as a campaign against the "rootless cosmopolitan" (a euphemism for "Jew"). In his speech which he titled "On Several Reasons for the Lag in Soviet Dramaturgy" at a plenary session of the board of the Soviet Writers' Union in December 1948, Alexander Fadeyev equated the cosmopolitans with the Jews. (Note: Konstantin Azadovskii and Boris Egorov in an article titled From Anti-Westernism to Anti-Semitism published in the Journal of Cold War Studies writes "In 1949, however, the attacks on cosmopolitans (kosmopolity) acquired a markedly anti-Semitic character. The very term cosmopolitan, which began to appear ever more frequently in newspaper headlines, was increasingly paired in the lexicon of the time with the word rootless (bezrodnye). The practice of equating cosmopolitans with Jews was heralded by a speech delivered in late December 1948 by Anatolii Fadeev at a plenary session of the board of the Soviet Writers' Union. His speech, titled "On Several Reasons for the Lag in Soviet Dramaturgy," was followed a month later by a prominent editorial in Pravda, "On an Anti-Patriotic Group of Theater Critics." The "anti- patriotic group of theater critics" consisted of Aleksandr Borshchagovskii, Abram Gurvich, Efim Kholodov, Yulii Yuzovskii, and a few others also of Jewish origin. In all subsequent articles and speeches the anti-patriotism of theater and literary critics (and later of literary scholars) was unequivocally connected with their Jewish nationality.") In this anti-cosmopolitan campaign, many leading Jewish writers and artists were killed. Terms like "rootless cosmopolitans", "bourgeois cosmopolitans", and "individuals devoid of nation or tribe" appeared in newspapers. (Note: Konstantin Azadovskii and Boris Egorov in an article titled From Anti-Westernism to Anti-Semitism published in the Journal of Cold War Studies writes "Terms such as rootless cosmopolitans, bourgeois cosmopolitans, and individuals devoid of nation or tribe continually appeared in newspaper articles. All of these were codewords for Jews and were understood as such by people at that time.") The Soviet press accused cosmopolitans of "groveling before the West", helping "American imperialism", "slavish imitation of bourgeois culture" and "bourgeois aestheticism". (Note: Konstantin Azadovskii and Boris Egorov in an article titled From Anti-Westernism to Anti-Semitism published in the Journal of Cold War Studies writes "Of the many crimes attributed to Jews/cosmopolitans in the Soviet press, the most malevolent were "groveling before the West," aiding "American imperialism," "slavish imitation of bourgeois culture," and the catch-all misdeed of "bourgeois aestheticism.") Victimization of Jews in the USSR at the hands of the Nazis was denied, Jewish scholars were removed from the sciences, and emigration rights were denied to Jews. The Stalinist antisemitic campaign ultimately culminated in the Doctors' plot in 1953. According to Patai, the Doctors' plot was "clearly aimed at the total liquidation of Jewish cultural life". Communist antisemitism under Stalin shared a common characteristic with Nazi and fascist antisemitism in its belief in a "Jewish world conspiracy".

The Soviet government's antisemitic policy was also implemented in the Soviet Occupation Zone of Germany. As the historian Norman Naimark has noted, officials in the Soviet Military Administration in Germany (SVAG) by 1947–48 displayed a "growing obsession" with the presence of Jews in the military administration, they were particularly obsessed with the Jewish presence in the Cadres Department's Propaganda Administration. Jews in German universities who resisted Sovietisation were characterized as having "non-Aryan background" and being "lined up with the bourgeois parties".

Scholars such as Erich Goldhagen claim that following the death of Stalin, the Soviet government's policy towards Jews and the Jewish question became more discreet, with indirect antisemitic policies replacing direct physical assaults. Erich Goldhagen suggests that despite being famously critical of Stalin, Nikita Khrushchev did not view Stalin's antisemitic policies as "monstrous acts" or "rude violations of the basic Leninist principles of the nationality policy of the Soviet state".

The Black Book of Soviet Jewry was a historical work written by Vasily Grossman and Ilya Ehrenburg and compiled by the Jewish Anti-Fascist Committee to document Nazi crimes in the Holocaust. Initially able to be published during the war, the book was censored by the Soviet Union postwar. Typically, the official Soviet policy regarding the Holocaust was to present it as atrocities committed against Soviet citizens, without specifically acknowledging the genocide of the Jews.

On 12 August 1952, Stalin's antisemitism became more visible as he ordered the execution of the most prominent Yiddish authors in the Soviet Union, in an event known as the Night of the Murdered Poets. Stalin organized an antisemitic campaign, known as the "Doctors' plot" in 1953. Stalin accused predominantly Jewish doctors of plotting against the state and planned show trials, dying before the campaign continued. According to Patai, the Doctors' plot was "clearly aimed at the total liquidation of Jewish cultural life." Historian Louis Rapoport wrote on this subject, emphasizing the increasingly paranoid antisemitism of Stalin before Stalin's sudden death. Communist antisemitism under Stalin shared a common characteristic with Nazi and fascist antisemitism in its belief in a "Jewish world conspiracy".

Immediately after the Six-Day War in 1967, the antisemitic conditions triggered a desire to emigrate among many Soviet Jews. Soviet Jews who sought to emigrate, but were not allowed to emigrate by the Soviet government, were known as refuseniks.

On 22 February 1981, in a speech which lasted over 5 hours, General Secretary Leonid Brezhnev denounced antisemitism in the Soviet Union. While Stalin and Lenin said much the same in various statements and speeches, this was the first time that a high-ranking Soviet official had done so in front of the entire Party. Brezhnev acknowledged the existence of antisemitism within the Eastern Bloc and he also acknowledged the fact that the "requirements" of many different ethnic groups were not being met.

== Africans ==
On 18 December 1963, a number of students from Ghana and other African countries organized a protest on Moscow's Red Square (Russian SFSR, USSR) in response to the alleged murder of the medical student Edmund Assare-Addo. The number of participants was reported at 500–700.

Edmund Assare-Addo was a 29-year-old student of the Kalinin Medical Institute. His body was found in a stretch of wasteland along a country road leading to the Moscow Ring Road. African students alleged that he was knifed by a Soviet man because Assare-Addo was courting a Russian woman. The African students based their allegation on the unlikelihood of a student venturing into that remote place. The Soviet authorities stated that Assare-Addo froze to death in the snow while drunk. According to the autopsy, performed by Soviet medics with two advanced medical students from Ghana as observers, the death was "an effect of cold in a state of alcohol-induced stupor". No signs of physical trauma were found, with the possible exception of a small scar on the neck.

The protesters were African students studying at Soviet universities and institutes. Having assembled on the morning of 18 December 1963, they wrote a memorandum to present to Soviet authorities. The protesters carried placards with the slogans "Moscow – center of discrimination", "Stop killing Africans!" and "Moscow, a second Alabama", while shouting in English, Russian, and French. The protesters marched to the Spasskiye Gates of the Kremlin, where they posed for photographs and gave interviews to Western correspondents. The Soviet TASS news agency responded with a statement: "It is to be regretted that the meetings of the Ghanaian students which began in connection with their claims to the embassy of their country resulted in the disturbance of public order in Moscow streets. It is quite natural that this is resented by the Russian people".

== See also ==
- Antisemitism in Russia
- Antisemitism in Ukraine
- Antisemitism in the Soviet Union
- Racism in Russia
- Racism in Ukraine
- Post-Soviet conflicts
