= Latvian Operation of the NKVD =

Mass arrests and executions of Latvians in the USSR, 1937-38

Latvian Operation
- Part of the national operations of the NKVD
- Location: Soviet Union, modern-day Russia, Ukraine, Belarus, Kazakhstan and others
- Date: 1937–1938
- Target: Ethnic Latvians, Latvian nationals and persons otherwise affiliated with Latvia and/or Latvians
- Attack type: Summary executions; Massacres; Mass murder; Ethnic cleansing
- Deaths: at least 16,573
- Perpetrator: People's Commissariat for Internal Affairs (NKVD)

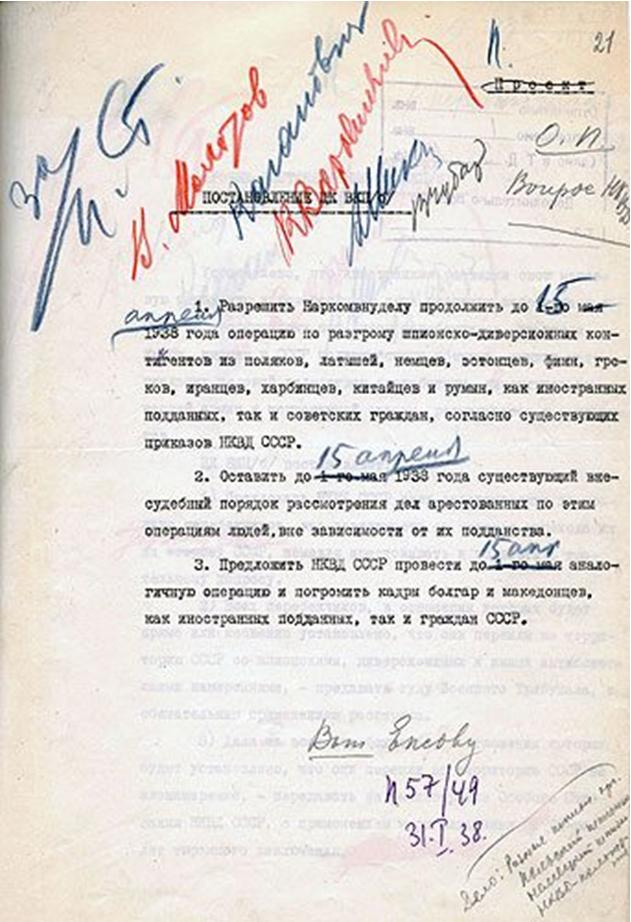
A 31 January 1938 resolution by Central Committee of the Communist Party of the Soviet Union to extend the National operations of the NKVD until 15 April for the destruction of Polish, Latvian, German, Estonian, Finnish, Greek, Iranian, Harbinian, Chinese and Romanian "spy-saboteur contingent" signed by Josif Stalin, Vyacheslav Molotov, Lazar Kaganovich, Kliment Voroshilov, Anastas Mikoyan and Vlas Chubar

The Latvian Operation (Russian: «Латышская операция», Latvian: „Latviešu operācija”) was a national operation of the NKVD against ethnic Latvians, Latvian nationals and persons otherwise affiliated with Latvia and/or Latvians in the Soviet Union from 1937 to 1938 during the period of the Great Purge.

== Latvians in the Soviet Union until 1936 ==
More than 372 Latvian peasant colonies originating from the 19th century following the abolition of serfdom existed near St. Petersburg, Novgorod and in Siberia. As the Eastern Front was approaching Courland in the First World War, extensive forced evacuations were carried out, so that the number of Latvians living in Russia doubled to nearly 500,000. Many of the Latvian Riflemen were early supporters of the Bolsheviks in 1917. With the end of the First World War and the Russian Civil War, many of the refugees were able to return to independent Latvia. The Latvian–Soviet Peace Treaty provided explicitly for the repatriation of former Latvian riflemen and refugees. According to the 1926 Soviet census, about 150,000 Latvians had remained in the Soviet Union.

They cultivated an active cultural life with the schools, newspapers and theatres. Since the 1905 Revolution, there was a strong Latvian faction in the Russian Social Democratic Labour Party. Persons of Latvian descent temporarily held high positions in the State apparatus of Soviet Russia. Of the 70 Cheka commissars in 1918, there were 38 of Latvian descent.

However, with the increasing Russification of Russia's state organs, members of non-Russian minorities were largely ousted from management positions. Under the leadership of Josef Stalin, himself of non-Russian descent, Latvia was regarded as a so-called "enemy nation" and Latvians were generally regarded as "counter-revolutionary" and "suspicious elements". This perception is believed to have stemmed from the resistance of Latvian peasant colonists to forced collectivization at the end of the 1920s. Through targeted deportations to the Gulag, such colonies were eliminated by 1933. A rigorous purge of the party and state apparatus of non-Russians began at that time. The Latvian Communist Party in the Soviet Union was dissolved in 1936, with its members being persecuted and executed as "nationalists" and "enemies of the people". One aspect of Stalin's Great Purge was state-directed xenophobia. In July 1937, the Latvian cultural and educational society "Prometejs" was closed and its employees were arrested. In December 1937, the Latvian theatre "Skatuve" in Moscow was also closed and almost all of its actors and other employees were executed and buried in an unmarked mass grave in the Butovo firing range. The Red Latvian Riflemen were removed from history books and school textbooks and their veteran associations were dissolved.

== Round ups ==
On 23 November 1937, Nikolai Yezhov ordered the NKVD services to pool all the information gathered about Latvians in cultural and political life, the military and other institutions, to be able to arrest them "just as during the Polish operation".

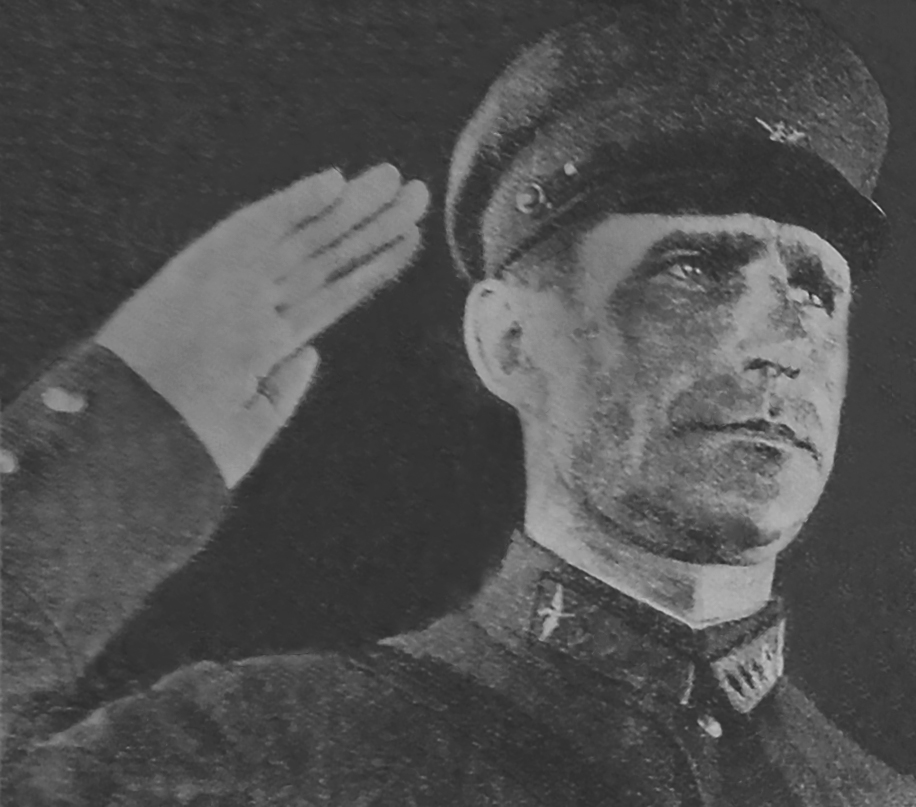
Yakov Alksnis, head of the Red Army Air Forces, fell victim to the operation

On 30 November 1937, in keeping with Order No. 49990 "On carrying out an operation of repressing Latvians" («О проведении операции по репрессированию латышей»), Latvians throughout the Soviet Union were arrested. The legal process was streamlined by standardized accusations and confessions, which resulted in sentences that the accused was remanded to labor camps or to be shot. With fabricated confessions obtained through torture, the NKVD constructed the existence of a Latvian espionage ring, which allegedly included all Latvian officials from the Politburo down to the school directors. The last Latvian Chekists were executed by their former colleagues.

Large groups of victims were shot at the shooting ranges of Butovo and Kommunarka near Moscow, in Levashovo near Leningrad or in Kurapaty near Minsk. However, the torture and murder in the framework of this operation took place throughout the Soviet Union.

Given a large number of detainees, the courts were unable to convict them quickly enough, despite the so-called album procedure. The date of completion of the operation was thus extended until August 1938. In October 1938, special Troika were then set up to deal with the backlog of unprocessed cases.

The Latvian operation ended when Yezhov's successor, Lavrenty Beria issued NKVD Order No. 00762 on 26 November 1938, marking the end of the Great Purge. The liquidation of the Latvian party officials caused certain difficulties for the Soviet authorities when they sought to establish a party and administrative apparatus after the occupation of Latvia in 1940.

== Results ==
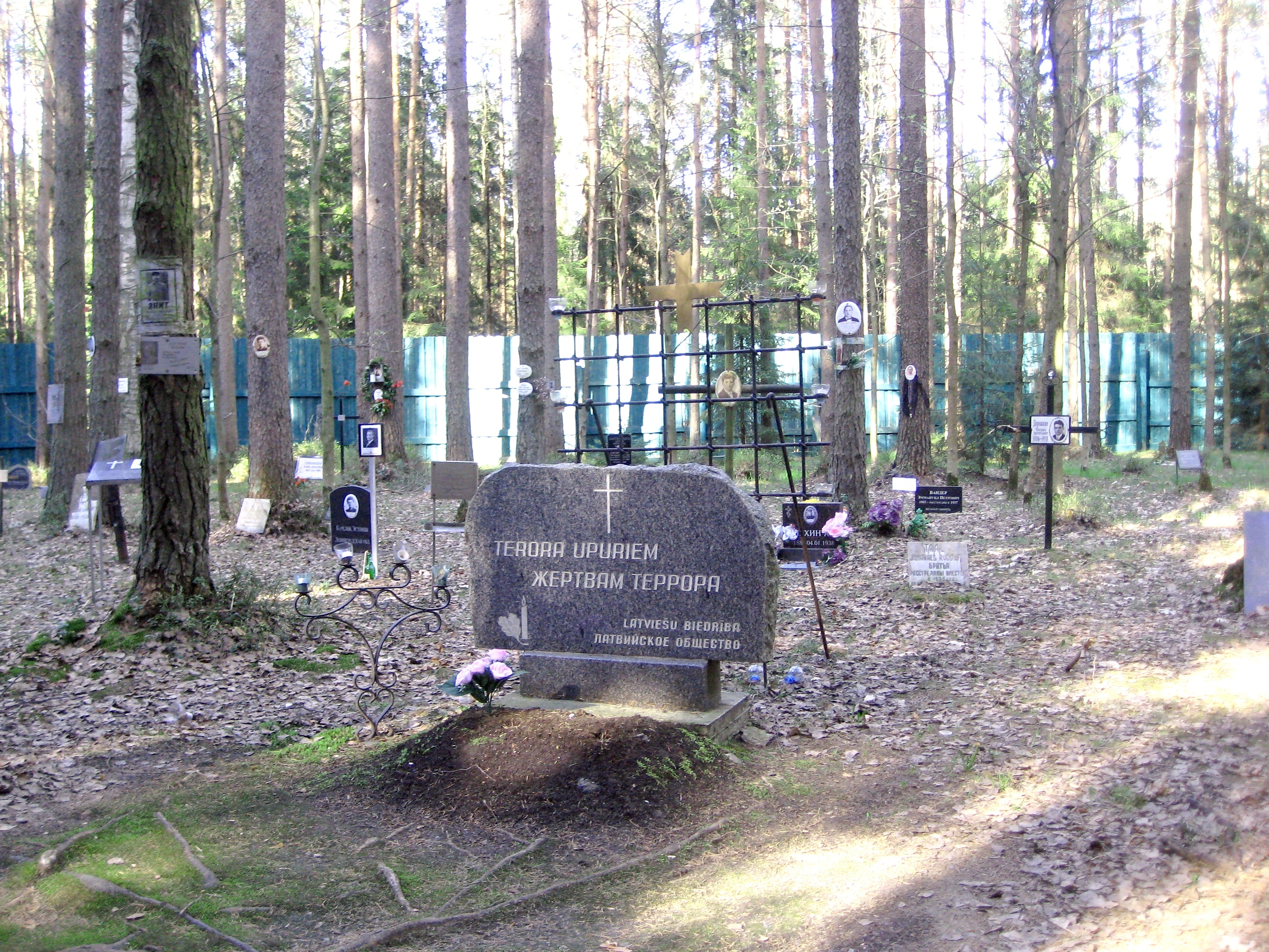
A memorial stone to all the Latvian victims of the Great Purge buried at Levashovo Memorial Cemetery

The convictions of 22,369 Latvians are known, 16,573 or 74% of whom were shot. Various estimates are based on 73,000 Latvian casualties. The exact number of the victims are unknown because many other people who were executed during the operation were not ethnically Latvian or Latvian nationals: These included spouses of persons sent to the Gulag because of their marriage with a member of the "enemy nation" as well as the children from such unions, who were sent to orphanages were not included in the statistics.

The operation resulted in the vast majority of remaining Latvians abandoning their culture out of fear of further repression, and the descendants of the Latvians in Russia barely speak Latvian today. The victims of the operation were rehabilitated during the Khrushchev Thaw; however, the exact information about specific deaths and dates could only be obtained after the dissolution of the Soviet Union in 1991. The perpetrators of the operation, often known by name, have never been tried.

=== Notable victims ===
- Yuri Aplok (Juris Aploks)
- Ernest Appoga (Ernests Apoga)
- Yakov Alksnis (Jēkabs Alksnis)
- Karl Bauman (Kārlis Baumanis)
- Reinholds Bērziņš
- Eduard Berzin (Eduards Bērziņš)
- Yan Karlovich Berzin (Jānis Bērziņš)
- Žanis Blumbergs
- Jūlijs Daniševskis
- Aleksandr Drevin (Aleksandrs Drēviņš)
- Robert Eikhe (Roberts Eihe)
- Aleksandr Eiduk (Aleksandrs Eiduks)
- Yuri Gaven (Juris Gavens)
- Gustav Klutsis (Gustavs Klucis)
- Vilhelm Knorin (Vilhelms Knoriņš)
- Martin Latsis (Mārtiņš Lācis)
- Marija Leiko
- Ivan Mezhlauk (Jānis Mežlauks)
- Valery Mezhlauk (Valērijs Mežlauks)
- Yakov Peters (Jēkabs Peterss)
- Yan Rudzutak (Jānis Rudzutaks)
- Ivan Strod (Jānis Strods)
- Kirill Stutzka (Kirils Stucka)
- Jukums Vācietis
- Leonid Zakovsky (Leonīds Zakovskis)

== See also ==
- Estonian Operation of the NKVD
- Finnish Operation of the NKVD
- German operation of the NKVD
- Greek Operation of the NKVD
- Polish operation of the NKVD

== Literature ==
- Pārsla Eglīte u.a.: "Latviešu akcija" PSRS 1937–1938. Museum of the Occupation of Latvia, 2007, ISBN 978-9984-9931-5-7.
- Björn M. Felder: Lettland im Zweiten Weltkrieg: Zwischen sowjetischen und deutschen Besatzern 1940–1946. Schöningh, 2009, ISBN 978-3-506-76544-4.
- Aivars Beika: Latvieši Padomju Savienībā. Komunistiskā genocīda upuri 1929–1939. In: Latvijas Okupācijas muzeja gadagrāmata; 1: 1999. Riga 2000.
- Anna Kaminsky: Erinnerungsorte an den Massenterror 1937/38: Russische Föderation. Bundesstiftung zur Aufarbeitung der SED Diktatur, 2007, ISBN 978-3-00-022887-2.
