= NKVD Order No. 00485 =

1937-38 Soviet ethnic cleansing of Poles

The Polish Operation of the NKVD (1937–38)
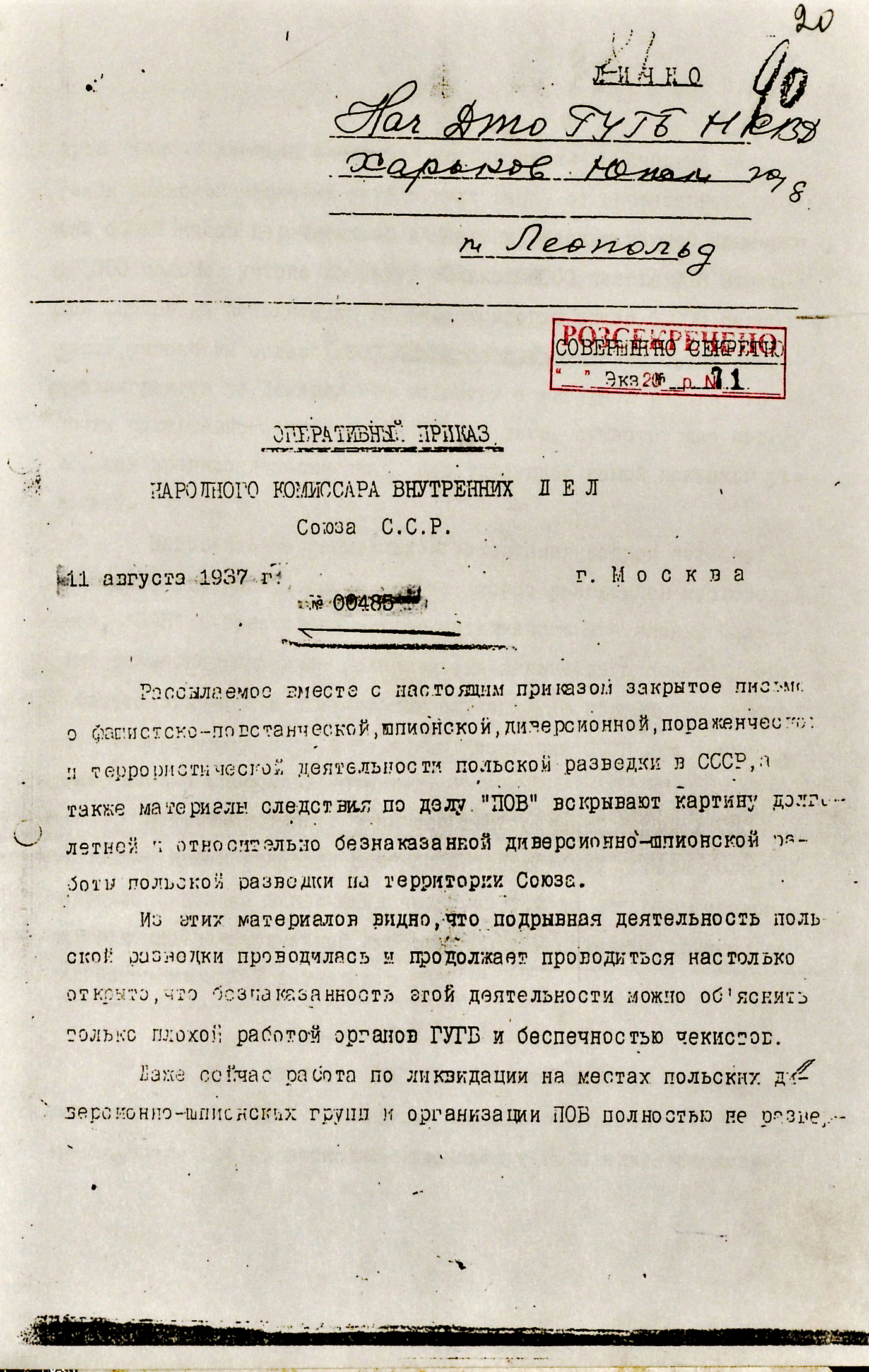
- First page of one of the copies of the order, archived by the Kharkov branch of the NKVD
- Location: Soviet Union, modern-day Russia, Ukraine, Belarus, Kazakhstan and others
- Date: 1937–1938
- Target: Poles
- Attack type: Prison shootings
- Deaths: At least 111,091 executed, mostly Poles
- Perpetrator: Soviet NKVD

The Soviet NKVD Order No. 00485 was an anti-Polish ethnic cleansing campaign issued on August 11, 1937, which laid the foundation for the systematic elimination of the Polish minority in the Soviet Union between 1937 and 1938. The order was called "On the liquidation of Polish sabotage and espionage groups and units of the POW" (POW stands for Polish Military Organization, Polska Organizacja Wojskowa) (Russian: О ликвидации польских диверсионно-шпионских групп и организаций ПОВ). It is dated August 9, 1937, was issued by the Central Committee Politburo (VKP b), and signed by Nikolai Yezhov, the People's Commissar for Internal Affairs. The operation was at the center of the national operations of the NKVD, and the largest ethnically motivated shooting action of the Great Terror.

== Arrests and executions ==
According to the order, the entire operation was to be completed in three months. Subject to arrest and immediate elimination were persons of the following categories: "prisoners of war from the Polish army who after the 1920 war had remained in the Soviet Union, deserters and political émigrés from Poland (such as Polish communists admitted through prisoners' exchange), former members of the Polish Socialist Party (PPS) and other anti-Soviet political parties; and the inhabitants of Polish districts in border regions." The order was supplemented by a secret letter from Yezhov, specifying the various accusations to be used against the Polish minority, which were fabricated by the Moscow NKVD executive. The order aimed at the arrest of "absolutely all Poles" and confirmed that "the Poles should be completely destroyed". Member of the NKVD Administration for the Moscow District, A. O. Postel (Арон Осипович Постель) explained that although there was no word-for-word quote of "all Poles" in the actual Order, that was exactly how the letter was to be interpreted by the NKVD executioners.

Particularly affected were Poles employed in the so-called "strategic" sectors of the economy such as transportation and telecommunications (e.g., railway engineers and postal workers), the defense industry, the armed forces, and the security services, as well as members of Polish cultural organizations. The Order created an extrajudicial sentencing body composed of two NKVD soldiers, the so-called "Dvoika" (twosome) completing the paperwork. The Order also established the so-called "album procedure" of convictions: the lists of convicted already during the initial investigations by lower NKVD organs were compiled into "albums" by the mid-rank NKVD organs and sent to the NKVD for approval. After the approval, the convictions (shooting or imprisonment) were immediately put into effect.

A similar procedure was applied to all other national operations of 1937–1938: German, Latvian, Finnish, Estonian, Romanian, Greek, and others. The procedure was amended in September 1938. To expedite the process, regional NKVD units were instructed to set up so-called "Special Troikas" (not to be confused with the regional Troikas established under the NKVD Order No. 00447) authorized to try the "national operations" cases locally.

According to official Soviet state documents, the anti-Polish operation of the NKVD affected 139,815 people, 111,071 of whom were condemned to death without trial and executed immediately afterwards.

== See also ==
- Soviet Major-General Vasily Blokhin, the chief NKVD executioner
