= Album procedure =

Soviet extrajudicial convictions, 1937–1938

The album procedure (Russian: в альбомном порядке, romanized: v albomnom poryadke) was a simplified procedure of extrajudicial conviction by NKVD, introduced in the Soviet Union during the Great Purge. The level of punishment (execution or imprisonment) of the arrested persons was decided by local organs during the investigation, the lists of the convicted were sent to NKVD headquarters, where they were approved en masse and returned for immediate application of the punishment. The name of the procedure came about because the lists collected by mid-range NKVD organs were bound into albums.

== Procedure ==
The procedure was introduced in the August 11, 1937 NKVD Order No. 00485 "On liquidation of Polish sabotage and espionage groups and units of P.O.W." (P.O.W. stands for the Polish Military Organization, Polska Organizacja Wojskowa.) The order specifies the process as follows:

- During investigations all arrested are to be classified into two categories: First Category, subject to execution by shooting, Second Category: subject to placement into prisons and GULAG labor camps. (Since the time of the Purges, the euphemisms "First Category" and "Second Category" have been in use for a long time, both in legal parlance and in common speech.)
- Every 10 days, lists of the convicted with brief summaries of the cases are to be sent to the Soviet NKVD.
- The lists are compiled by local NKVD organs and the categories (first or second) are assigned by NKVD chiefs and prosecutors of the republic, oblast or krai.
- After the approval by the NKVD of the Soviet Union and the Procurator General of the Soviet Union, the convictions are immediately put into action.

The procedure was supplementary to convictions performed by NKVD Troikas introduced by July 30, 1937 NKVD Order No. 00447.

Still, the number of convictions was so overwhelming that on September 15, 1938, the lower, regional level Special Troikas were introduced, with the rights to impose death penalties and immediately execute them.

Both NKVD Troikas of all levels and "album procedure" were officially discontinued by November 17, 1938, Decree about Arrests, Prosecutor Supervision and Course of Investigation No. 81.

As an example, during the German Operation of the NKVD (July 1937-November 1938) of 55,005 convicted Germans in Russia 41,898 were executed, with the shares of "album" and "Troika" shooting being 24,910 and 16,988 respectively. Other convictions: "albums": 5,624, "Troikas": 7,483.
