= Polish genocide =

Polish genocide may refer to:

- Massacres and religious segregation of Poles in the Russian Empire after the 1863 January Uprising
- The Holocaust in Poland
- Massacres of Poles in Volhynia and Eastern Galicia
- Nazi crimes against the Polish nation
- Polish Operation of the NKVD
- Soviet repressions of Polish citizens (1939–1946)
- Katyn massacre, a series of mass executions of Polish officers carried out by the Soviet Union
