= Mass operations of the NKVD =

Ethnic persecutions during the Great Purge

Mass operations of the People's Commissariat of Internal Affairs (NKVD) targeted specific categories of people during the Great Purge. Each was normally launched by an order of the head of the People's Commissariat of Internal Affairs, Nikolai Yezhov.

The national operations made up one of the three mass operations of the Yezhovshchina, alongside the "kulak" operation and the "militia" operation against criminals and other "socially harmful elements". A total of 340,000 to 350,000 people were sentenced, of whom 140,000 were targeted in the Polish operation and about 55,000 in the German one. 247,157 were executed, a larger percentage than overall for the Great Purge.

== National operations of the NKVD ==
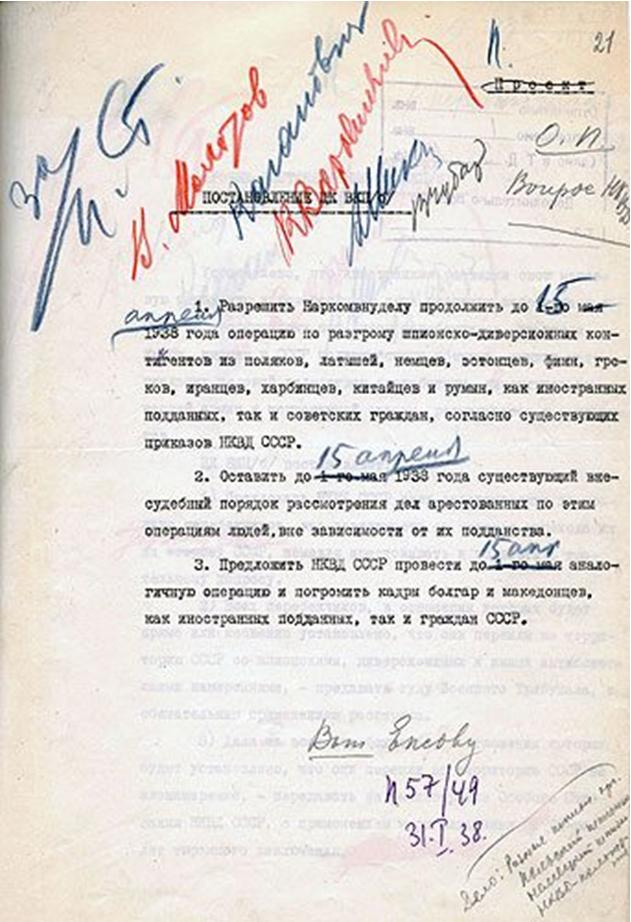
A 31 January 1938 resolution by Central Committee of the Communist Party of the Soviet Union to extend the National operations of the NKVD until 15 April for the destruction of Polish, Latvian, German, Estonian, Finnish, Greek, Iranian, Harbinian, Chinese and Romanian "spy-saboteur contingent" signed by Joseph Stalin, Vyacheslav Molotov, Lazar Kaganovich, Kliment Voroshilov, Anastas Mikoyan and Vlas Chubar

The operations targeted "foreign" ethnicities, those with cross-border ties to foreign nation-states, unlike the nationally targeted deportations of World War II. According to historian Oleg Khlevniuk, Stalin became concerned about rearguard uprisings of the kind seen in the Spanish Civil War and believed that "nationalities of foreign governments" posed a threat in border regions, even if they were Soviet citizens whose ancestors had sometimes lived decades or centuries in the areas controlled by the Soviet Union.

Minutes of the January 31, 1938 Politburo meeting list the following ethnicities against which NKVD operations were to be continued: Poles, Latvians, Germans, Estonians, Finns, Greeks, Iranians, Harbinites, Chinese, and Romanians. It was also suggested to carry out similar NKVD operations against Bulgarians and Macedonians.

Between August 1937 and October 1938 the NKVD arrested 335,513 people in the national operations and shot 247,157 of them, an estimated 34% of all victims of the Great Purge. Arrests followed ethnic lines, but the victims included Russians, Ukrainians and Belarusians; conversely, repression along the "German line" was lightest among the Volga Germans, who were not perceived as foreigners, while ethnic Russians who had worked on the Chinese Eastern Railway and spent years abroad were targeted as "Harbinites".

=== Background ===
From the early 1920s the Soviet leadership expected a major war and a new foreign intervention. Under the logic of collective responsibility, people of "foreign" nationalities were seen wholesale as a recruiting base for foreign intelligence services and as potentially disloyal to the Soviet regime. The NKVD was hunting spies and "wreckers" among the western minorities as early as 1934, while Lutheran and Catholic clergy were arrested in parallel and propaganda spread the idea of ubiquitous western spies and a "fifth column" inside the USSR.

=== Chronology ===
Key decisions of the national operations
Date	Instrument	Substance
March 9, 1936	Politburo resolution	"On measures protecting the USSR from the penetration of espionage, terrorist and sabotage elements": tightened the entry of political emigrants and created a commission to purge international organisations on Soviet territory.
July 25, 1937	NKVD Order No. 00439	Arrest within five days of all German subjects working at military factories, plants with defence workshops and on the railways; starting point of the German operation.
August 11, 1937	NKVD Order No. 00485	Launched the Polish operation from 20 August; served as the model for the later national operations.
August 17, 1937	NKVD order	Romanian operation against emigrants and defectors from Romania in Moldavia and Ukraine.
August 22, 1937	NKVD order "On foreigners"	Ended the renewal of residence permits for citizens of 21 countries unconditionally, and of 10 more countries "where compromising material exists".
September 20, 1937	NKVD Order No. 00593	Operation against the "Harbinites", former employees of the Chinese Eastern Railway.
November 30, 1937	Yezhov telegram No. 49990	Launched the Latvian operation.
December 11, 1937	Yezhov directive No. 50215	Launched the Greek operation.
December 14, 1937	NKVD directive	Extended the "Latvian line" procedures to Estonians, Lithuanians, Finns and Bulgarians.
January 29, 1938	NKVD directive	Launched the Iranian operation.
January 31, 1938	Politburo resolution	Extended the national operations until 15 April 1938.
February 1, 1938	NKVD directive	Operation against Bulgarians and Macedonians.
February 16, 1938	NKVD directive	Ordered arrests along the "Afghan line".
March 23, 1938	Politburo resolution	Ordered the defence industry purged of members of the nationalities under repression.
May 26, 1938	Politburo resolution	Extended the national operations until 1 August 1938.
June 24, 1938	Defence Commissariat directive	Discharged from the Red Army servicemen of nationalities not native to the territory of the USSR.
September 15, 1938	Politburo resolution	Created "special troikas" to decide the cases of people arrested along the national lines up to 1 August 1938.

=== Implementation ===
Unlike the "kulak" operation, the national operations had no numerical quotas: local NKVD chiefs decided the scale of arrests themselves.

Order No. 00485 established the "album procedure" used in all the national operations. Every ten days the local "dvoika", the regional NKVD chief and the prosecutor, signed indictments with recommended sentences, bound them into albums and sent them to Moscow for approval. There, staff drew up the protocols of the "Commission of the NKVD and the Prosecutor of the USSR", which were signed by Yezhov and Andrey Vyshinsky. Each protocol had two columns: the left one carried the convict's personal data, the right one the decision in capital letters, ranging from execution and corrective labour camp terms to re-investigation, transfer to a court, or release under surveillance.

By September 1938 tens of thousands of unresolved album cases had piled up in Moscow. NKVD Order No. 00606 of 17 September 1938 abolished the album procedure and created "special troikas" in every republic, krai and oblast, made up of the regional NKVD chief, the prosecutor and the regional party leader. They had two months to clear the backlog, and their decisions no longer needed Moscow's confirmation.

Under the "national" orders No. 00485 and No. 00593, the Commission of the NKVD and the Prosecutor of the USSR convicted 235,122 people, of whom 172,830 were sentenced to death; 9,529 people were expelled from the USSR, 7,777 exiled within the country, 37,619 cases sent back for further investigation and 12,903 people released. Outcomes varied sharply between regions: local investigators in Novosibirsk Oblast proposed death sentences for 97 percent of the accused, while in Omsk Oblast the share sentenced to death was 43.6 percent. In total, between the first album of 25 August 1937 and 17 November 1938, the album procedure and the special troikas decided the cases of 346,713 people, of whom 335,513 were convicted and 247,157 sentenced to be shot, 73.66 percent of those convicted.

In telegraph correspondence, NKVD officers used coded language: prisoners were called "blanks", and executions were disguised as reports on the "slaughter of livestock". Local initiative could go far. An operational group under Boris Kulvets, sent to the Bodaybo district of Irkutsk Oblast in early 1938, arrested about four thousand people, seizing the local Chinese and Korean population wholesale from lists of "persons of foreign origin". Of those arrested, 938 were shot in Bodaybo in 1938; Kulvets was himself arrested after Yezhov's fall.

=== Individual operations ===
Outcomes of the national operations by "line"
Operation	Convicted	Executed	Notes
Polish	139,835	111,091	The largest operation
German	55,005	41,898	65,000–68,000 arrested in total
Harbin	46,317	30,992	Mostly ethnic Russian returnees from Harbin
Latvian	21,300	16,575	
Iranian	13,297	2,046	
Greek	12,557	10,545	Estimates of all Greeks killed or disappeared range from 20,000 to 50,000
Finnish	11,066	9,078	Estimates of all Finnish victims range from 8,000 to 25,000
Estonian	9,735	7,998	
Romanian	8,292	5,439	
Afghan	1,557	366	
Chinese	—N/a	3,932	Executions concentrated in August–November 1938; accompanied by deportations
Korean	—N/a	—N/a	Deportation rather than an "album" operation; an estimated 40,000 deaths

==== Poles ====
The Polish operation was the largest of the national operations, and Order No. 00485 served as the model for the others. It ordered the arrest of remaining members of the Polish Military Organisation, all former prisoners of war of the Polish army still in the USSR, defectors from Poland regardless of when they had crossed, political emigrants and prisoner exchangees from Poland, former members of the Polish Socialist Party and other Polish parties, and "the most active part of local anti-Soviet nationalist elements" in Polish districts. Okhotin and Roginsky explain its scale by Poland's standing as the neighbour perceived as most dangerous throughout the 1920s and 1930s, by the entrenched myth of Polish perfidy, and by the fact that the USSR had more defectors from Poland and more residents of Polish nationality than of any other "foreign" nationality except Germans; in their analysis, the criterion of guilt was not nationality as such but birth in, residence in, or any tie to the country concerned.

The scale of the alleged espionage bore no relation to the real thing: NKVD files record about 102,000 "Polish spies" uncovered in 1937–1938, many of them in Siberia, while declassified records of the Central Military Archive in Warsaw show that Polish intelligence then ran no more than 200 agents worldwide. The Polish Military Organisation itself was presented as a live conspiracy allegedly founded by Józef Piłsudski, and Russian archives record cases of arrested Russians, Ukrainians and Belarusians being forced to "confess" that they were Poles. Political emigrants who had fled to the USSR were hit especially hard; the defector Walter Krivitsky recalled the case of Tomasz Dąbal, exchanged to Moscow from a Polish prison and welcomed in triumph, then shot in the late 1930s as an alleged agent of Polish military intelligence.

Prosecution along the "Polish line" was not limited to ethnic Poles. Of 36,768 people convicted along this line in September–November 1938, 20,147 were Poles, 5,215 Belarusians, 4,991 Ukrainians, 3,235 Russians and 1,122 Jews, alongside smaller numbers of Germans, Lithuanians, Latvians and others. In total the operation convicted 139,835 people, of whom 111,091 were shot; about 16 percent of all Poles living in the USSR ended up imprisoned.

==== Germans ====
Although Yezhov's order on the arrest of German subjects dates from 25 July 1937, the German operation proper began after Order No. 00485 and followed the Polish model. The first targets were the standard "suspect" categories: political emigrants, defectors, former prisoners of war, people who received letters or parcels from Germany, visitors to German consulates, and participants in emigrant and cultural organisations. Once the card files on these groups were exhausted, NKVD officers arrested people for their German nationality alone, or on the suspicion of it. In total 65,000–68,000 people were arrested in the German operation and 55,005 convicted, of whom 41,898 were shot and 13,107 sentenced to camps, exile or expulsion. Some emigrants from Germany were handed over to Nazi Germany: Ernst Fabisch, a former member of the Communist Party of Germany youth organisation, was deported in January 1938, arrested by the Gestapo at the border and killed in Auschwitz in 1943.

==== Latvians ====
In November 1937 the head of the NKVD directorate for Smolensk Oblast, Alexei Nasedkin, reported to Yezhov the existence of a "Latvian national centre" and asked for permission to arrest 500 of the 5,000 Latvians on his operational registers. According to Yezhov's biographer, he replied: "Nonsense, I will clear it with the Central Committee, and we will need to bleed the Latvians; arrest no fewer than 1,500–2,000, they are all nationalists." Arrests of prominent Latvians, including Jēkabs Alksnis, Jānis Bērziņš, Jēkabs Peterss, Mārtiņš Lācis and Jukums Vācietis, followed, and the operation was launched across the USSR by Yezhov's telegram No. 49990 of 30 November 1937, on the model of the Polish operation.

Investigative files from a later prosecutor's inquiry record how the operation was run in Moscow. According to the testimony of the arrested NKVD department head A. O. Postel, monthly control figures of 1,000–1,200 arrests per department turned the operation into "a literal hunt for Latvians and the destruction of the adult male Latvian population of Moscow", with Leonid Zakovsky instructing interrogators to "smash faces at the first interrogation"; membership lists of the Latvian club were used for wholesale arrests. His colleague Alexander Radzivilovsky testified that when he asked Yezhov how to uncover a Latvian underground in practice, Yezhov told him not to be embarrassed by the absence of evidence but to pick out several Latvian communists and "knock the necessary testimony out of them", while Mikhail Frinovsky recommended sentencing arrestees to death on indirect or unverified material if no confession could be obtained.

By 10 September 1938 the Commission of the NKVD and the Prosecutor had decided 17,851 cases along the "Latvian line", sentencing 13,944 people to death; in total 21,300 people were convicted in the Latvian operation, of whom 16,575 were shot.

==== Finns ====
No official directive opened the "Finnish operation": the NKVD in Leningrad Oblast and Karelia began purging Finns on its own initiative in September–October 1937, working from the Polish operation's Order No. 00485. The Karelian interior commissar Karl Tenison, aware that a career could not be built on the republic's tiny Polish, German and Latvian populations, pressed Yezhov for official sanction, and in December 1937 the first albums of Finns accused of espionage and sabotage went to Moscow: 900 people were convicted from the first nine albums, 727 of them (80.8 percent) sentenced to death. From February 1938 lists of Finns to be arrested poured in from district NKVD offices; in the main areas of Finnish settlement and in Petrozavodsk arrests took place daily, sometimes in the street, and arrested Finns were driven away by the truckload from the Kondopoga paper mill and the Petrozavodsk ski factory. In September–October 1938 the special troikas convicted a further 1,805 people along the "Finnish line", 94.6 percent of whom were shot. Finns made up over 40 percent of all those repressed in Karelia in 1937–1938, while constituting 3.2 percent of the republic's population.

==== Greeks ====
The Greek operation began with directive No. 50215 of 11 December 1937, which claimed that the NKVD had uncovered a network of Greek nationalist, espionage, insurgent and wrecking organisations aiming to destroy Soviet power in the areas of compact Greek settlement and to establish a "bourgeois state of the fascist type". On 15 December 1937 a wave of arrests swept Georgia, Crimea, the Donetsk and Odessa regions of Ukraine, Krasnodar Krai and Azerbaijan; about 8,000 Greeks were arrested in the first ten days. The historian Ivan Dzhukha estimates 5,000–6,000 victims of the operation in Ukraine, around 4,500–4,600 of them in the Donetsk region. In the Kuban about 5,200 people of Greek nationality were arrested, of whom 92–94 percent were shot.

==== Chinese and Koreans ====
In 1937–1938 the NKVD carried out mass arrests of Chinese, and many were shot, including dozens of Chinese who had fled to the USSR after the Japanese invasion of Manchuria in 1931 and been interned in Khakassia. In May–July 1938 some 7,900 Chinese were deported from the Soviet Far East to Xinjiang; those who took Soviet citizenship rather than return to China were resettled to the Kur-Urmi district of the Far Eastern Krai (1,900 people), and a further 1,400 were exiled to Kazakhstan. The Koreans of the Far East had been deported to Kazakhstan and Uzbekistan under a Politburo resolution of 1937, in transports lasting five to eight weeks that cost many deportees their lives.

Nationality of arrested persons, from January 1, 1936 to July 1, 1938,
Nationality	Arrested	Share of arrested, %	Share of population, %	Overrepresentation
Russians	657,799	46.30%	58.39%	0.79
Ukrainians	189,410	13.33%	16.48%	0.81
Poles	105,485	7.42%	0.37%	20.10
Germans	75,331	5.3%	0.8%	6.34
Belarusians	58,702	4.1%	3.1%	1.34
Jews	30,542	2.15%	1.78%	1.21
Latvians	21,392	1.51%	0.07%	22.43
Iranians	14,994	1.06%	0.02%	45.72
Estonians	11,002	0.77%	0.08%	9.20
Finns	10,678	0.75%	0.08%	8.94
Chinese	8,538	0.60%	0.02%	32.00
Buryats	7,845	0.55%	0.13%	4.19
Greeks	6,565	0.46%	0.17%	2.75
Koreans	5,161	0.36%	0.11%	3.40
Lithuanians	2,818	0.20%	0.02%	10.37
Others (Note: Among them 2,989 Romanians, 2,091 Afghans and 236 Japanese.)	219,610	15.46%	18.61%	0.83
Total	1,420,711	100%	100%	1

== Other ==
- NKVD Order No. 00447, an operation to repress ex-kulaks, criminals, and other anti-Soviet "elements"
- Family members of traitors to the Motherland

== Rollback ==
On November 17, 1938, the joint decree "On arrests, prosecutorial supervision and the conduct of investigations" of the Sovnarkom and the Central Committee, approved by the Politburo two days earlier, dissolved the extraordinary judicial bodies, prohibited mass arrest operations and again made arrests conditional on the sanction of a court or prosecutor. The implementing NKVD order No. 00762, signed by Lavrentiy Beria on November 26, 1938, cancelled most of the NKVD's mass-operation orders (but not all, see, e.g., NKVD Order No. 00689) and suspended the implementation of death sentences, marking the end of the Great Purge ("Yezhovshchina").

== See also ==
- Soviet deportations from Bessarabia and Northern Bukovina (1940–1951)
- Genocide of the Ingrian Finns
- Deportation of Kurds in the Soviet Union
- Mass killings under communist regimes
- Outline of the Great Purge (Soviet Union)
- Timeline of the Great Purge
