= Soviet repression of Poles =

Soviet repression of Poles may refer to:

- Polish Operation of the NKVD (1937–38)
- Soviet repressions of Polish citizens (1939–1946)
- Katyn massacre, a series of mass executions of Polish officers carried out by the Soviet Union
