= NKVD Order No. 00593 =

Soviet mass persecution of repatriates living in North Manchuria

Harbin Operation of the NKVD
- Part of Mass operations of the NKVD in the Great Purge
- Location: Soviet Union
- Date: 1937-1938
- Target: Harbin Russians
- Attack type: Enforced disappearance, Summary executions
- Deaths: +/- 30,992
- Perpetrators: Nikolai Yezhov (NKVD), Joseph Stalin

NKVD Order No. 00593, also known as NKVD Order about Harbinites (приказ НКВД о харбинцах, ("Харбинский приказ") by September 20, 1937, undersigned by Nikolai Yezhov regulated arrest and prosecution of former Russian personnel (Harbin Russians) of the China Far East Railway (KVZhD), who had lived in Harbin and reemigrated into the Soviet Union after 1935, when the KVZhD was sold to the Japanese puppet state of Manchukuo.

== Background ==
The Chinese Eastern Railway (KVZhD) was constructed in 1897—1903. After the Russo-Japanese War, the southern portion of the railway was ceded to Japan, which created the South Manchuria Railway out of the former Russian portion of the railway.

In the 1920s, some 120,000 Russian citizens lived in Manchuria. 43,500 persons, 64.5% of the population of Harbin, were Russians. The Russian population began to steadily drop as economic conditions deteriorated due to the Bolshevik victory in the Russian Civil War, causing high rates of unemployment.

Emigration from Northern Manchuria to the Soviet Union increased in the 1930s as the Soviet Government sold the railway to Manchukuo, accelerating as some 19,570 residents left Manchuria to the Soviet Union in 1935 alone.

== Order No. 00593 ==
By 1935, the NKVD began actively persecuting Harbin repatriates. Yezhov's order to arrest and execute the Harbinites stated that of 25,000 registered "Harbinites" the majority were former White Guardists, "emigre spying-fascist organizations", former policemen etc. and worked for the Japanese intelligence service.

It was ordered to perform arrests (from October 1, 1937 to December 25, 1937) of all Harbinites that fell into 13 pre-defined categories. Those who didn't match any of the listed categories were to be immediately removed from all jobs related to transport and industry.

Soviet intelligence conducted an investigation of Harbin emigres who had recently repatriated to Voronezh Oblast, concluding that out of 2,500 persons investigated, 248 were former members of the White army or intelligence services and 108 were members of overseas political organizations.

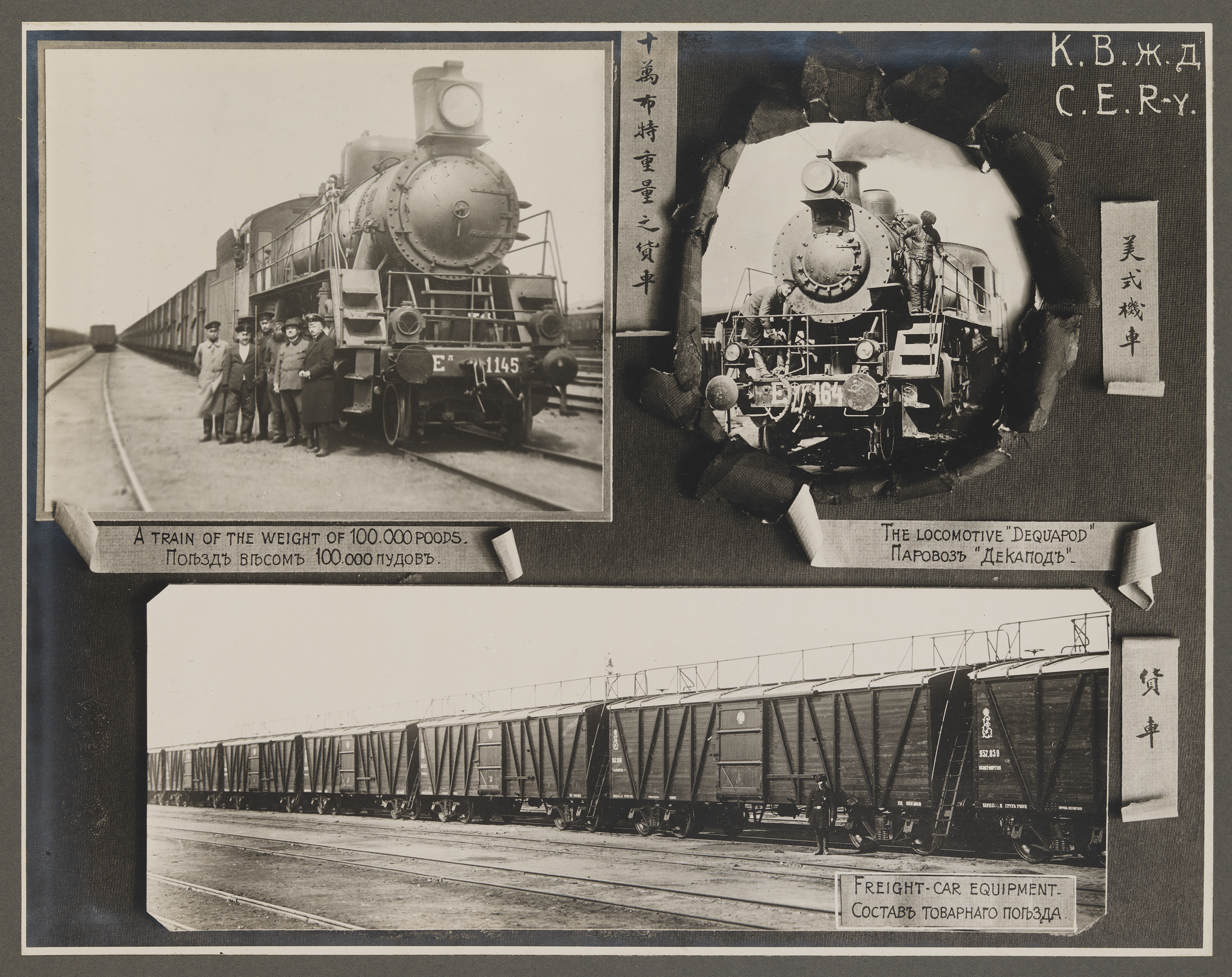
Locomotives and Railcars on Chinese Eastern Railway

== Implementation ==
The operation lasted beyond the deadline of December 25th.

According to the data collected by Memorial, 48,133 Harbinites were repressed, of which whom 30,992 were shot.

Order No. 00593 instructed to handle the family members of the arrested according to the NKVD Order No. 00486 about family members of "traitors to the Motherland".

== Sources ==
- Onegina, Svetlana (1997), "The Resettlement of Soviet Citizens from Manchuria in 1935-36: A Research Note", Europe-Asia Studies, 47 (6): 1043–1050, doi:10.1080/09668139508412304, JSTOR 152843
- Korzhov, Nikolay (2017), Stalin's Great Terror: The forgotten Harbin operation, Al Jazeera

== See also ==
- Bureau of Russian emigrants in the Manchurian Empire
- White movement in Transbaikal
- Russian Fascist Party
- Harbin Special Service Agency
