= NKVD troika =

Set of three officials of the Soviet political police issuing quick sentences

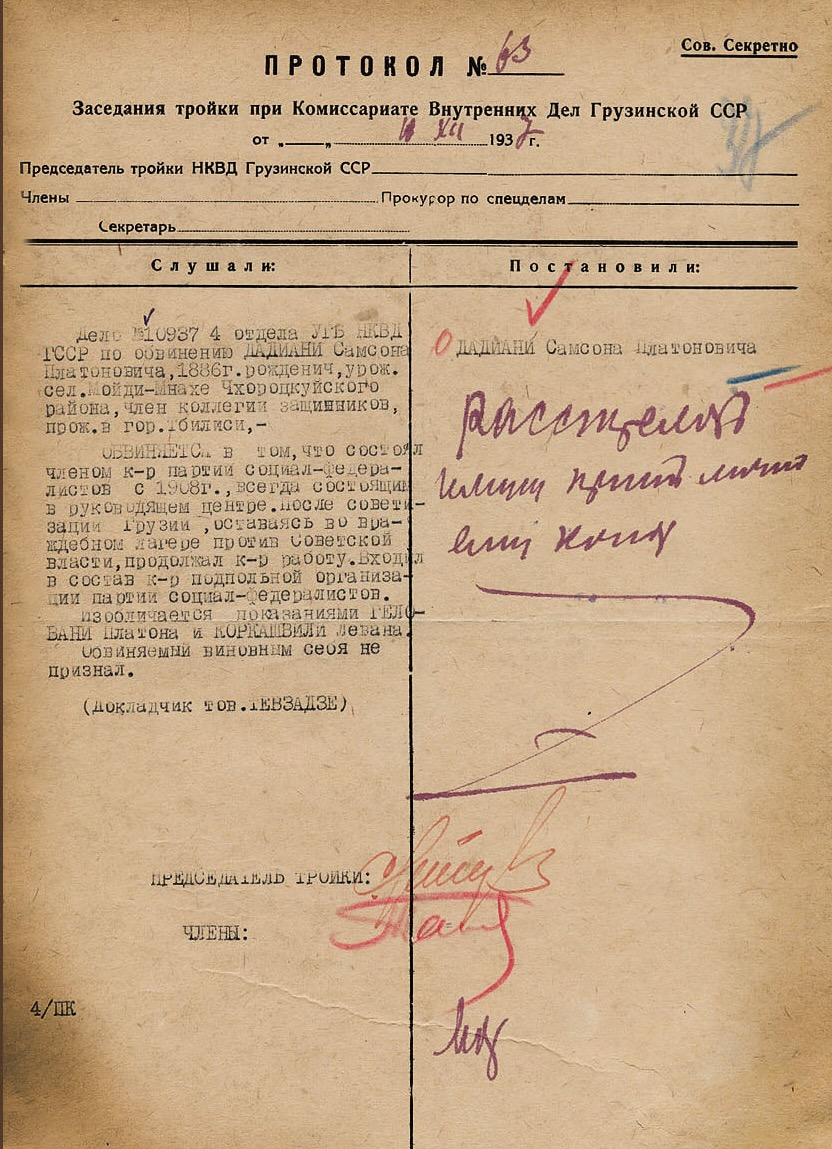
NKVD troika of the Georgian SSR sentencing Samson Dadiani to execution due to "remaining a member of the enemy camp opposed to Soviet rule". The document is marked "Top Secret"

NKVD troika or Special troika (Russian: особая тройка, romanized: osobaya troyka), in Soviet history, were special quasi-judicial proceedings composed of three officials from the security police (for much of the troikas' existence, the NKVD, hence the name) who issued sentences to people after simplified, speedy investigations and without a public trial. The three members acted as ad hoc judges. These commissions were employed as instruments of extrajudicial punishment introduced to supplement the Soviet legal system with a means for quick and secret execution or imprisonment.

It began as an institution of the Cheka, then later became prominent again in the NKVD, when it was used during the Great Purge to execute many hundreds of thousands of Soviet citizens. Defendants in the Troika's proceeding were typically not entitled to legal aid or the presumption of innocence. Troika members employed common sense and socialist revolutionary principles to reach a verdict. Convictions usually did not include information about the actual incriminating evidence and basically contained only information about indictment and sentencing. The outcome of such trials was often predetermined before it even began due to targeted numbers of citizens to be executed or imprisoned in Gulag prison camps.

Troika means "a group of three" or "triad" in Russian.

== Background ==
The first troika was instituted in 1918, the members being Felix Dzerzhinsky, Yakov Peters, and Left SR Vyacheslav Aleksandrovich.

In January 1930, as part of the collectivization program, the Soviet Politburo authorized the state police to screen the peasant population of the entire Soviet Union. Normal legal procedures were suspended and the corresponding OGPU order of the 2nd of February, specified the measures needed for "the liquidation of the kulaks as a class". This instituted a regional based system for these troikas to work, so that the operations could be handed locally and with a quicker result. In each region, the troikas would decide the fate of the landlords branded as "kulaks". The troika, composed of a member of the state police, a local communist party secretary, and a state procurator, had the authority to issue rapid and severe verdicts (death or exile) without the right to appeal. In effect they served as judges, juries, and executioners.

The secret police troikas became an execution machine, implementing persecutions and torture of priests or other "anti-Soviet elements." This was done in secret and the victims of these trials often stood no chance at fighting the claims placed before them. They were often forced to give evidence against themselves and watch as the members of the troika sentenced them, often to death.

At the beginning of the Great Patriotic War the NKVD was tasked with deporting thousands of Germans from the Volga German Autonomous Soviet Socialist Republic. This decree issued from Moscow in 1941 was the responsibility of the Troika and all measures of decrees execution were left in the hands of the so-called three who made up this particular Troika. After the war responsibilities within the government began to shift and in 1952 two special Troikas were created. The first Troika consisted of Georgy Malenkov, Nikita Khrushchev (who was also heavily involved with the Great Purge and Show trial), and Nikolai Bulganin. The second consisted of Lavrentiy Beria, Mikhail Pervukhin, and Maksim Saburov. These troikas were created to make sure there were clear duties between party and state; although it was common to be involved on both party and state committees, this blurred the lines between party and state functions.

== Secret Order № 00447 — the "Kulak Operations" ==
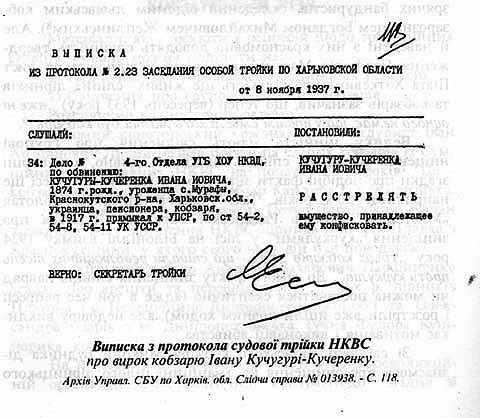
NKVD document sentencing the blind "Ukrainian pensioner bandurist" Ivan Kucherenko to execution by shooting. The title of the signatory (in Russian: Секретарь Тройки — "Secretary of the Troika") can be seen.

On June 28, 1937, the Politburo issued a decree to set up a troika in West Siberia. While the original intent was to discover if there was a plot stemming from the ROVS, a group of white officers based in Paris, this can be seen as the first step in the creation of order NKVD Order no. 00447.

The NKVD Order no. 00447 by July 30, 1937 О репрессировании бывших кулаков, уголовников и других антисоветских элементов ("Concerning the repression of former kulaks, criminals, and other anti-Soviet elements") undersigned by Nikolai Yezhov. By this order, troikas were created on the levels of republic, krai and oblast. Investigation was to be performed by 'operative groups' "in a speedy and simplified way" and the results were to be delivered to troikas for trials. The regional troikas had control over the target groups, the size of the initial limits, the extension of the deadline for completing the operation, the relationship between the initial limits and the final number of victims" Initially, the target groups were limited to only Kulaks and criminals. After some time it broadened to enemies of the Motherland.

The chairman of a troika was the chief of the corresponding territorial subdivision of NKVD (People's Commissar of a republican NKVD, etc.). Usually a troika included the prosecutor of the republic/krai/oblast in question; if not, he was allowed to be present at the session of a troika. The third person was usually the Communist Party of the Soviet Union (CPSU) secretary of the corresponding regional level. The staff of these troikas were personally specified in the Order No. 00447. While Order 00447 decreed the personal constitution of all troikas, in the course of the Purge many members of troikas were repressed themselves, so the staff of troikas varied over time.

Protocols of a troika session were passed to the corresponding operative group for executions of sentences. Times and places of executions of death sentences were ordered to be held in secret. Troikas of this purpose were established for a period of 4 months, but functioned for about a year.

When Operation No. 00447 was finally stopped, on November 17, 1938, by the Decree about Arrests, Prosecutor Supervision and Course of Investigation, issued jointly by the Sovnarkom and Central Committee of the CPSU, it is estimated that up to 767,000 persons had been condemned, of whom 387,000 had been executed by shooting.

== The "National Operations" ==
On August 11, 1937, following a Politburo top-secret resolution taken two days earlier, Nikolai Yezhov issued another secret directive, Order No. 00485, aimed at "the complete liquidation of local branches of the Polish Military Organization (POW) and its networks of spies, wreckers and terrorists in industry, transport and agriculture".

Due to a backlog of people being processed by "dvoikas" (two person extrajudicial commissions) as part of the Polish Operations, on September 15, 1938, the Politburo issued the resolution (# П64/22) about the creation of special troikas (Особая тройка) for the period of the Polish operation of the NKVD.

Order No. 00485 served as a model for a series of similar NKVD "National Operations" targeting a number of the Soviet Union's diaspora nationalities and ethnic groups: the German, Finnish, Latvian, Estonian, Romanian, Greek, and Chinese. The NKVD referred to these decrees collectively as "the National Operations" directed against "nationalities of foreign governments".

According to NKVD statistics, from July 1937 to November 1938, 335,513 persons were sentenced by troikas in the course of the implementation of the National Operations. Among them, 247,157 (or 73.6%) were executed by shooting.

== The American Jewish Joint Agricultural Cooperation and Birobidzhan (JAR) ==
The American Jewish Joint Agricultural Cooperation Agro-Joint, 1924–1938 worked to permanently resettle Jews from shtetls (small Jewish settlements) into new agriculture based settlements across Southern Ukraine and Crimea. Agro-Joint had aided in the resettlement of German-Jewish doctors to help grow the living standards of the communities. Germans were among the top nationalities being repressed and eliminated in Soviet Russia during the thirties while Stalin prepared for war with Hitler. During the Great Purge, 1937–38, there was a directive to rid the Soviet lands of all those with outside (non-Soviet) ties or connections. Members of the Agro-Joint, as well as foreign colonies and national diasporas such as the settlements they established, fell squarely within those parameters. Although the Agro-Joint was never intended as a permanent program, the swiftness and fierceness with which it was dismantled by the Soviet regime shocked those involved, in particular, its leader Joseph Rosen whose network of internal Soviet connections fell to the purges.

In total around 60 high-ranking members of the Agro-Joint staff were arrested, most of whom were tried and sentenced by NKVD Troikas on the grounds of being counter-revolutionaries, nationalists, or spies.

Happening in conjunction with the resettlements by the Agro-Joint was the Soviet Union's attempt at giving the Jewish population a homeland. This was the Jewish Autonomous Region commonly referred to by its central city Birobidzhan established in 1928, though not officially recognized as an Autonomous Region by the Central Committee of the Communist Party of USSR until May 1934. Though conditions were tough and approximately 2/3rds of the original settlers left upon seeing that things were not as promised, those that remained founded Birofeld, the first Jewish collective farm in 1928. In 1936, barely a year after the official recognition as an Autonomous Region, The Great Terror began and the Jewish Party leadership both in Moscow and Birobidzhan was decimated by arrests and fast trials (by troika), resulting in either imprisonment or execution on charges such as "bourgeois nationalism" or being spies for the Germans. Prominent Jewish writer Moyshe Litvakov confessed to being an agent for the Gestapo.

== The Katyn Massacre ==
The Katyn Massacre was a mass execution of around 15,000 Polish military officers carried out by the NKVD during the spring of 1940. The killings took place in the Katyn forest in Russia and other sites. After a request from Polish general Władysław Anders on the whereabouts of the 15,000 Polish POWs in 1941, the Soviet Union replied that the soldiers had fled and could not be located. The whereabouts of these prisoners remained unknown until 1943 when approximately 4,000 bodies were found by German soldiers at the Katyn location. Physical evidence suggested that the soldiers were shot in the back of the head and then buried in large piles. The Soviet Union went on to deny these killings until 1990 when Soviet leader Mikhail Gorbachev acknowledged that the Soviet Union was, in fact, responsible for the deaths. Many of the documents surrounding the massacre were destroyed and others were not made public until 2010.

According to the released documents, the executions were authorized by a troika consisting of Vsevolod Merkulov, Bogdan Kobulov, and Leonid Bashtakov.

== See also ==
- Bibliography of Stalinism and the Soviet Union § Terror, famine and the Gulag
- Special Council of the NKVD
- Kangaroo court
