= Juris Aploks =

Latvian military personnel

- Born: April 21, 1893; Goldingen County, Courland Governorate, Russian Empire
- Died: April 2, 1938 (aged 44) Moscow, Soviet Union
- Allegiance: Russian Empire; Soviet Union
- Branch: Imperial Russian Army; Soviet Red Army
- Service years: 1914–1918 (Russian Empire); 1918–1938 (Soviet Union)
- Rank: Komdiv
- Conflicts: World War I Russian Civil War

Juris Aploks (Russian: Юрий Юрьевич Аплок, Yuri Yuryevich Aplok; April 21, 1893 – April 2, 1938) was an officer of Latvian Riflemen and later a Soviet Komdiv.

== Military career ==
He was born on 21 April, 1893 in the family of a farmer in Raņķi Parish, Kuldīga district. At the beginning of World War I, he was drafted into the Imperial Russian Army, and in 1915 was sent to study at the Pskov Ensign School. After graduating from military school he participated in battles as an officer of the 2nd Riga Latvian Riflemen Regiment, and in 1917 was promoted to the rank of staff captain.

After the October Revolution, he went over to the Bolshevik side. During the German attack on 25 February, 1918, he commanded parts of the 2nd Riga Latvian Rifle Regiment in the battles near Pskov. After the establishment of the Red Latvian Rifle Division, on 21 June, 1918, he was appointed chief of the operational part of its headquarters, and on 27 July, chief of staff. In August 1918, he was sent to the Urals to fight against the Czechoslovak Legion, where he served as Chief of Staff of the Soviet 3rd Army, in 1919 as Deputy Chief of Staff of the 6th Rifle Division, and as Assistant Chief of Staff of the Eastern Sector of the Front.

After the end of the Russian Civil War, he commanded the Ukrainian and Crimean Cheka troops (1921) and the GPU troops of the Moscow Military District (1922). In 1922, Aploks graduated from the Frunze Military Academy, in 1924 he was appointed commander of the 14th Rifle Division, in 1930 as Deputy Chief of Staff of the North Caucasus Military District, and in 1932 as Deputy Chief of Staff of the Moscow Military District. He was a recipient of the Order of the Red Banner and the Order of the Red Star.

== Arrest, execution and rehabilitation ==
During the Great Purge as a part of the so-called "Latvian Operation", he was arrested on 18 December, 1937, sentenced to death by the Military Collegium of the Supreme Court of the Soviet Union on 1 April, 1938, executed the next day, and buried in the Kommunarka mass grave. He was rehabilitated on 25 June, 1958.

== Bibliography ==
- Гражданская война и военная интервенция в СССР. — М.: Советская Энциклопедия, 1983.
- Список лиц с высшим общим военным образованием состоящих на службе в РККА. — Пг.: Воен. тип. Штаба РККА, 1923.
- Сувениров О. Ф. [in Russian] (1998), Трагедия РККА 1937—1938, Moscow: ТЕРРА, ISBN 5-300-02220-9
- Удмуртская республика: Энциклопедия. — Ижевск: Издательство «Удмуртия», 2000.
- Черушев Н. С.; Черушев Ю. Н. (2012), Расстрелянная элита РККА (командармы 1-го и 2-го рангов, комкоры, комдивы и им равные): 1937—1941. Биографический словарь [Shot elite of the Red Army (commanders of the 1st and 2nd ranks, comkors, divisional commanders and their equal): 1937-1941. Biographical Dictionary], Moscow: Kuchkovo field; Metropolis [Кучково поле; Мегаполис], pp. 173–174, ISBN 978-5-9950-0217-8

== Sources ==
- Биография на сайте РККА
- На сайте Мемориал
