= Aleksandr Eiduk =

Soviet secret policeman and poet (1886–1938)

Aleksandr Vladimirovich Eiduk (Russian: Александр Владимирович Эйдук, Latvian: Aleksandrs Eiduks, 1886–1938) was a Soviet Cheka operative and poet of Latvian ethnicity. During the Great Purge, Eiduk was arrested and shot as a part of the so-called "Latvian Operation" by the NKVD on August 28, 1938. He was rehabilitated in 1956.

== Early years ==
Eiduk was born in 1886 in the family of Valdemārs Eiduks, scribe of Vietalva-Odziena parish of the Cēsis district and teacher of Zādzene, and his wife Minna, born Liepa in Kreis Wenden of the Governorate of Livonia, then part of the Russian Empire. He studied at the Riga Commercial School, from which he graduated in 1903, then worked as an assistant to the scribe of Saikawa Parish (1904–1905). He joined the Latvian Social Democratic Workers' Party and participated in the events of the 1905 Russian Revolution. During the punitive expedition in 1906, he fled to Germany through Odessa, where he worked in the Berlin office (1906–1908), then later in the Mintzer brothers' factory in Vienna (1908–1914).

At the beginning of the First World War, he was arrested as a citizen of the Russian Empire and was in a series of internment camps, first in Drosendorf and Grossau in Lower Austria from August 1914 to August 1917, followed by political quarantine in Tyrol in Austria from September to December 1917. After the October Revolution, Eiduks returned to Latvia.

== Soviet career ==
At the beginning of 1918 he was the chairman of the Revolutionary War Tribunal of the 5th Army in Daugavpils. After the German occupation he went to Russia, where he dealt with prisoners of war cases as Commissioner of the People's Commissariat of Military Affairs, then in the fall of 1918 he headed the Revolutionary War Tribunal of the 6th Army in Vologda. From October 1918, he worked in Cheka, was a member of the presidium of the All-Russian Emergency Commission, an investigator, and a member of the collegium of the People's Commissariat of the Internal Affairs of the CPSU (NKVD) (1919–1920).

In 1920–1921 he worked in the People's Commissariat of Foreign Trade of the RSFSR (Наркомвнешторг РСФСР), heading the department of foreign agencies, then cooperated with foreign organizations that provided support to Russian famine victims (1921–1923). In the 1920s, Eiduk served as a Soviet representative to the American Relief Administration, whose agents appreciated him for "moving with a celerity not characteristically Russian".

One of the first Soviet defectors, G. A. Solomon, who worked with Eiduk during this period in the People's Commissariat for Foreign Trade, recollected in the first volume of his memoirs Eiduk's pleasure at engaging in the Cheka's work with "purely sadistic bloodthirstiness and unrestrained ferocity". In 1919, an American diplomat testified to Congress that Eiduk was, with another Cheka leader, considered the "most blood-thirsty monster in Russia".

On April 23, 1923, Eiduk was dismissed from his post and expelled from the Bolshevik Party for "loitering and playing in casinos" and sent to Central Asia, where he served on the Turkestan–Siberian Railway Planning Board (1923–1924). After that, he settled in the Supreme National Economic Council of the USSR, where he worked from 1925 to 1928. In 1928, after the restoration of his Party membership, he continued to work in various economic positions. In 1934, he began to manage the Eastern district of the Gulag camps (Дмитровлаг), whose prisoners participated in the construction of the Moscow–Volga canal.

== Arrest, execution and rehabilitation ==
During the Great Terror, on June 4, 1938, he was arrested by the NKVD as part of the "Latvian Operation" on charges of "espionage and belonging to a counter-revolutionary organization". He was executed at the Komunarka mass grave near Moscow on August 28, 1938. He was rehabilitated in 1956.

== Poetry ==
Eiduk is best remembered for his poetry extolling the political terror of the Soviet secret police. In the early 1920s, soon after the Red Army invasion of Georgia, he published the following poem in an anthology entitled The Cheka's Smile:

There is no greater joy, nor better music
Than the crunch of broken lives and bones.
This is why when our eyes are languid
And passions begin to seethe stormily in the breast,
I want to write on your sentence
One unquivering thing: "Up against the wall! Shoot!"

== Works ==
- Alexander Wladimirovic Eiduck, Die russische Hungersnot 1921–1922 und ihre Bekämpfung im Lichte der Tatsachen, Berlin, Vereinigung internationaler Verlagsanstalten, 1922.
