= Vershina, Bokhansky District =

Vershina Вершина (Russian) Wierszyna (Polish)
- Village
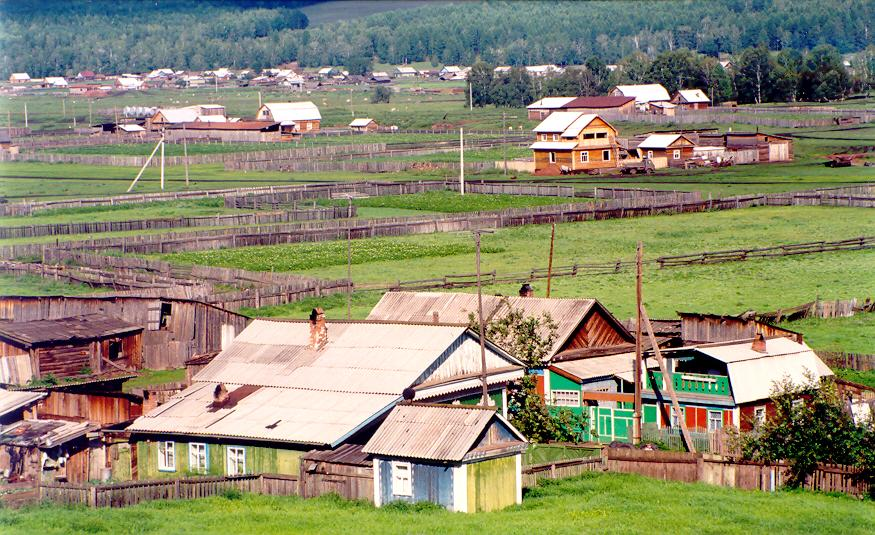
- Vershina in 2000.

- Location within Irkutsk Oblast Location within Russia
- Coordinates: 53°15′02″N 104°25′04″E
- Country: Russia
- Oblast: Irkutsk
- Okrug: Ust-Orda Buryat
- District: Bokhansky
- Municipality: Sharalday

Population (2012)
  - Total: 329
- Time zone: UTC+3:00
- Postal code: 669323

Vershina (Russian: Вершина, transcription: Vershina; Polish: Wierszyna) is a village in the Irkutsk Oblast, Russia, within the Bokhansky District, Ust-Orda Buryat Okrug, in the municipality of Sharalday. In 2012 it was inhabited by 329 people, most of whom were of Polish descent.

== History ==
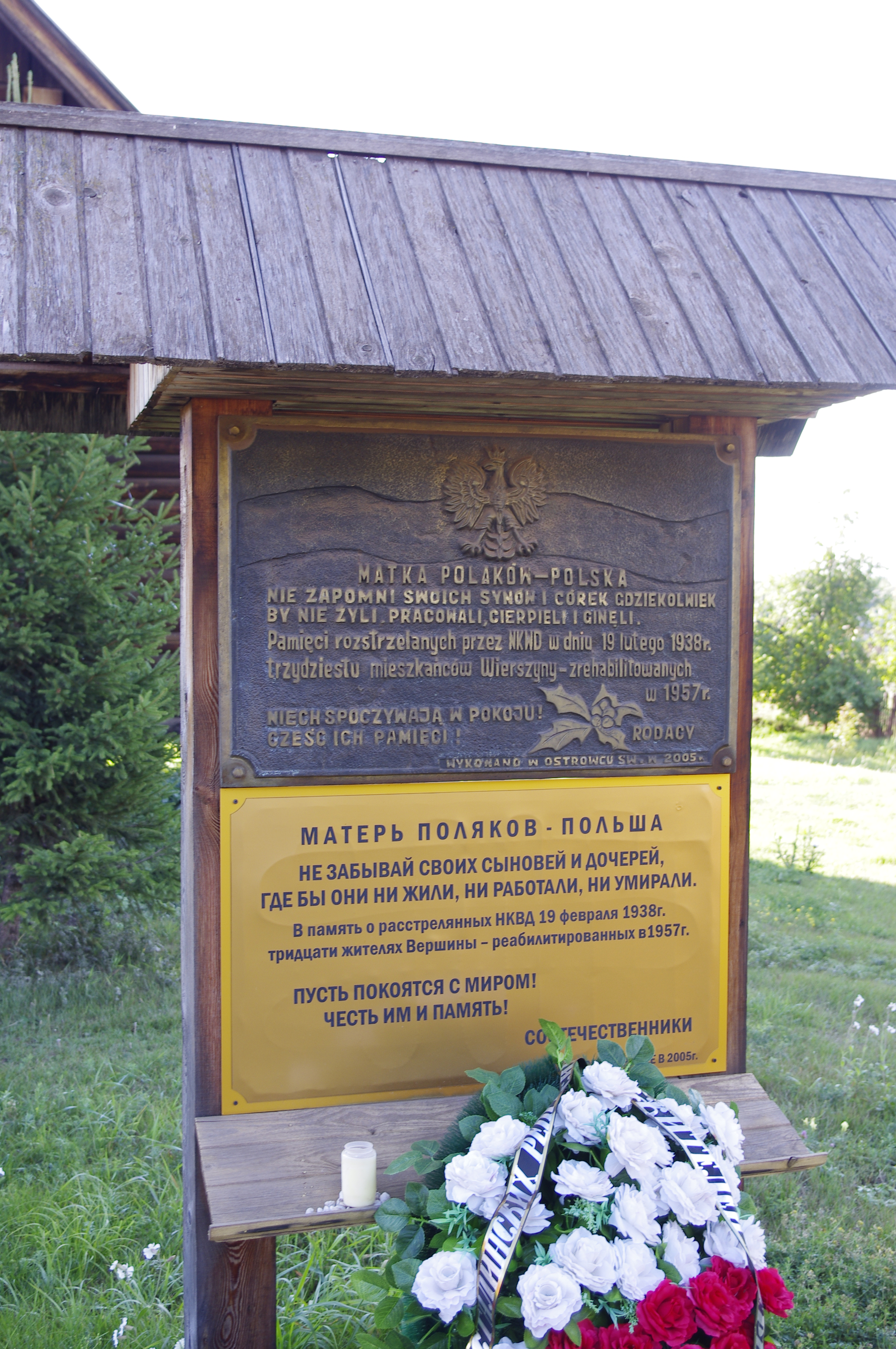
Memorial plaques to local victims of the Polish Operation of the NKVD

The village was established in 1910 by Polish immigrants from Congress Poland, mostly originating from the regions of the Lesser Poland and Dąbrowa Basin. The settlers were encouraged to move there by the promise of receiving 15 dessiatins (16.35 ha) of land and 100 rubles. The area was inhabited by the native population of Buryats, who helped settlers in the first years. Both populations kept good relations with each other.

In 1915 in the village was opened the St. Stanislaus Church. It functioned until 1928 or 1929, when the Soviet administration decided to demolish it. Thanks to the protest of local population, it never happened, however the church still remained closed, and its interiors were devastated. In 1938, during the Polish Operation of the NKVD, 30 inhabitants of the village were executed by the NKVD officers. During the Soviet era, population was also forced into the russification, having to hide speaking Polish and practicing their Catholic religion. Despite that, the population kept their language and religion, still practicing both to this day. Following the fall of the Soviet Union, the local church reopened in 1992.

Currently, the village is a tourist attraction among tourists from Poland, fascinated by the presence of Polish population in Siberia. In 2019, in the village was placed the memorial plaque with the names of the original settlers of the village, to commemorate their memory. In 2021, the village was visited by Krzysztof Krajewski, the ambassador of Poland to Russia.

== Demographics ==
=== Population ===
Historical population
Year	2002	2010	2011	2012	2021
Pop.	88	328	328	329	328
±%	—	+272.7%	+0.0%	+0.3%	−0.3%

=== Ethnicity ===
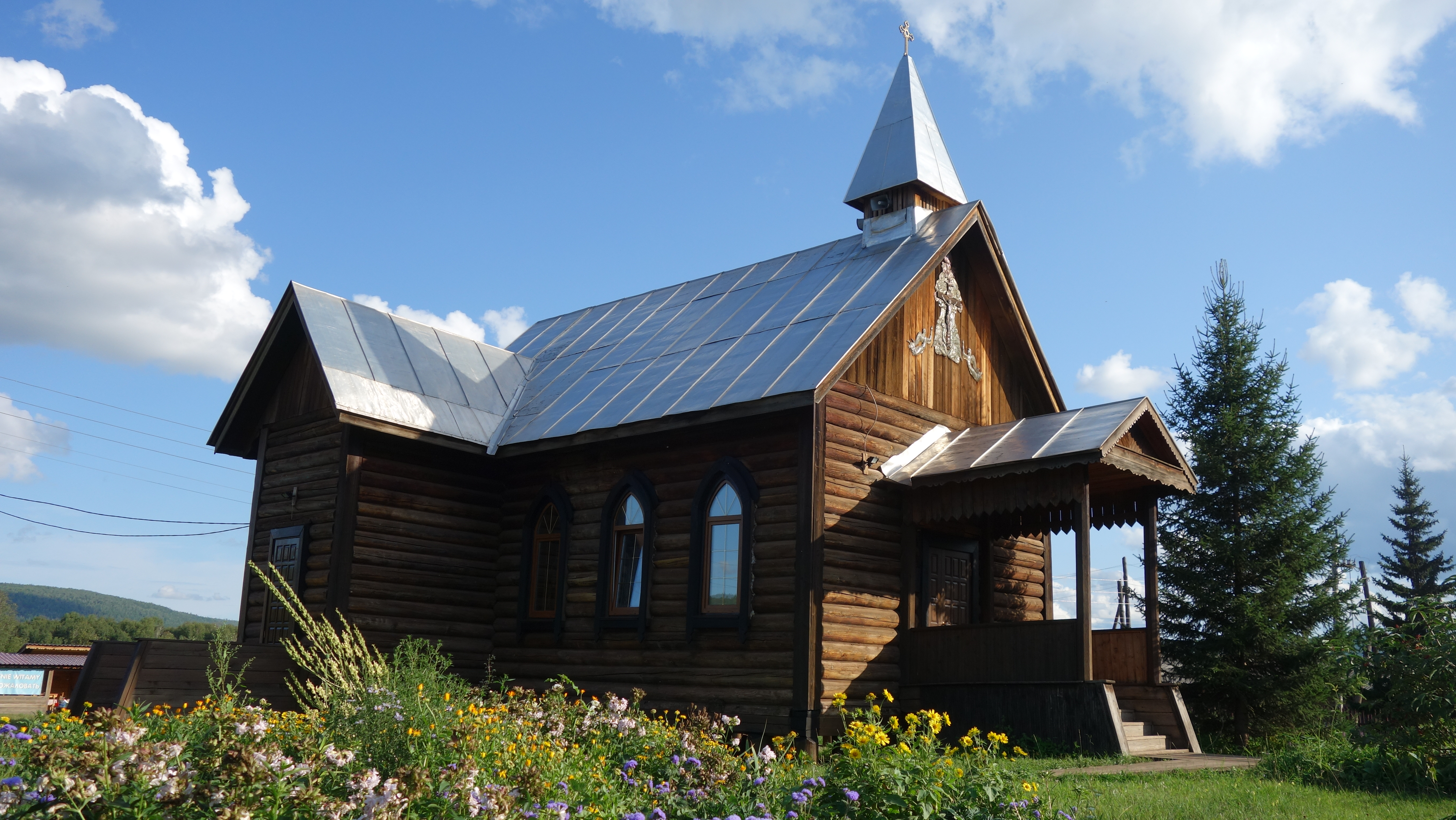
St. Stanislaus Church

Distribution of the population by ethnicity according to the 2021 census:

	percent
Poles	51.22%
Russians	44.51%
Ukrainians	1.83%
Buryats	1.52%
Tatars	0.61%

=== Language ===
The local languages spoken by the population are Russian, Polish, and Buryat. The local Polish dialect is characterized by influences from Russian and archaic elements, surviving from the dialect spoken by the original settlers. It differs from the language spoken in Poland, however both forms are still mutualaly intelligible. In the village operates a school teaching in Polish language. Historically, Polish language was written down with Cyrillic alphabet locally, as opposed to the Latin script used in Poland, however, in modern day, the latter is used instead.
