= Yakov Alksnis =

Russian-Latvian military personnel

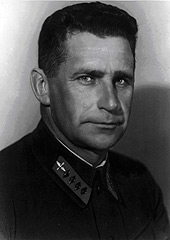
- Yakov Alksnis in the Netherlands in 1934
- Born: 26 January [O.S. 14 January] 1897; Naukšēni Parish, Governorate of Livonia, Russian Empire
- Died: 29 July 1938 (aged 41); Kommunarka shooting ground, Moscow Oblast, Soviet Union
- Cause of death: Execution by shooting
- Military career
- Allegiance: Russian Empire (1917); Soviet Union (1919–1937)
- Service years: 1917–1937
- Rank: Komandarm 2nd rank
- Commands: Soviet Air Force
- Conflicts: World War I Russian Civil War
- Awards: Order of Lenin; Order of the Red Banner (twice); Order of the Red Star
- Other work: RSDLP (Bolsheviks) (1916–1918); Russian Communist Party (1918–1937)

Yakov Ivanovich Alksnis (Russian: Яков Иванович Алкснис, Latvian: Jēkabs Alksnis; 26 January [O.S. 14 January] 1897 – 29 July 1938) was a Soviet military leader and the commander of the Red Army Air Forces from 1931 to 1937. During the Great Purge, he was arrested as part of the Latvian Operation, and later sentenced to death under false charges and shot.

== Biography ==
Jēkabs Alksnis was born in a farmer's family in Naukšēni Parish, Governorate of Livonia, Russian Empire (present-day Latvia), working as a shepherd at age 7. He attended school in Rāmnieki (1907–1913) and a teachers' seminary (college) in Valmiera (1913–1917), where he joined the Bolshevik Party in 1916. In 1917 Alksnis was drafted into the Imperial Russian Army; he completed basic officers' training in Odessa and was assigned to the 15th Siberian Regiment, later the 11th Siberian Regiment. Having proven himself to be unreliable, was sent to the Western Front, arriving at the front shortly before the October Revolution.

After the Treaty of Brest-Litovsk he left the Russian Army. He returned to Valmiera as a Soviet worker, but due to the German occupation, left for Bryansk, where in the summer of 1918 he was elected a member of the Bryansk district committee of the RCP(b).

Alksnis was drafted again, this time to the Red Army, in 1919, and in 1919–1921 held administrative and political assignments in the Southern Russian theatre of war. After graduation from the Red Army Military Academy (1921–1924) Alksnis was appointed the head of the logistics service of the Red Air Forces; in 1926 the deputy commander of the Red Air Forces. In 1929 he received the wings of a fighter pilot at the Kacha pilot's school in Crimea and was later known to fly nearly every day. Defector Alexander Barmine described Alksnis as "a strict disciplinarian with high standards of efficiency. He would himself personally inspect flying officers... not that he was fussy or took the slightest interest in smartness for its own sake, but, as he explained to me, flying demands constant attention to detail... Headstrong he may have been, but he was a man of method and brought a wholly new spirit into Soviet aviation. It is chiefly owing to him that the Air Force is the powerful weapon it is today." According to Barmine, Alksnis was instrumental in making parachute jumping a sport for the masses. He was influenced by one of his subordinates who had seen parachutists entertaining the public in the United States, at the time when Soviet pilots regarded parachutes as "almost a clinical instrument".

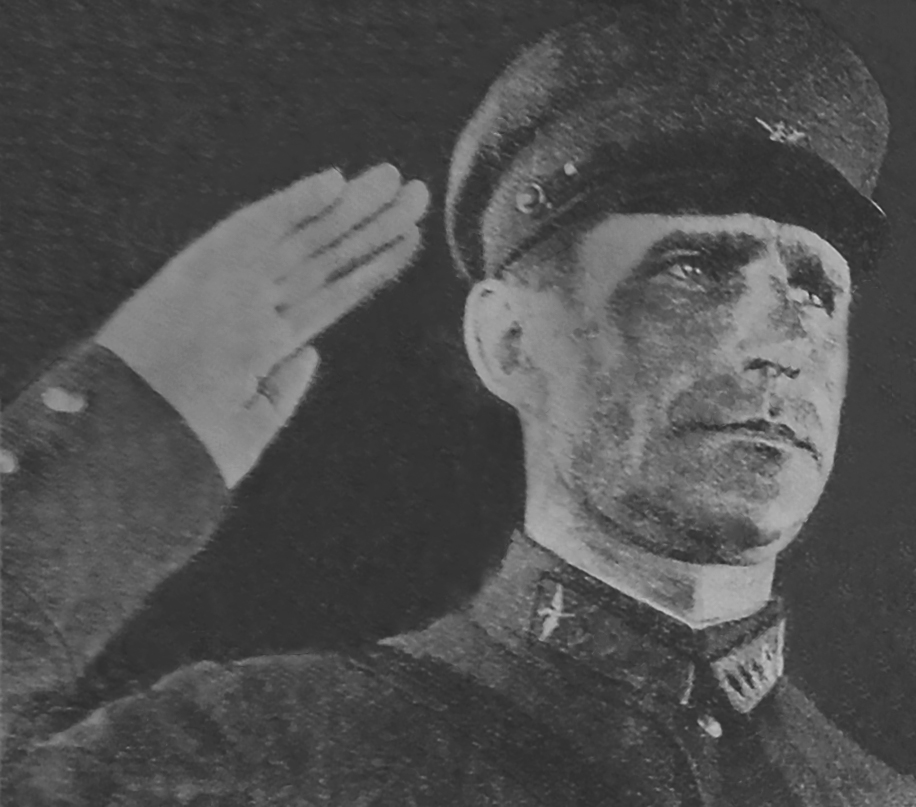
Yakov Alksnis on the 7th Conference of the All-Union Leninist Young Communist League (Komsomol). 1932

In the same year he was involved in establishing one of the first sharashkas – an aircraft design bureau staffed by prisoners of Butyrka prison, including Nikolai Polikarpov and Dmitry Grigorovich. In 1930–1931 the sharashka, now based on Khodynka Field, produced the prototype for the successful Polikarpov I-5. In June 1931 Alksnis was promoted to the Commander of Red Air Forces, while Polikarpov and some of his staff were released on amnesty terms. In 1935, the Red Air Forces under Alksnis possessed the world's largest bomber force; aircraft production reached 8,000 in 1936.

In June 1937 Alksnis sat on the board of the show trial of the members of the supposed Trotskyist Anti-Soviet Military Organization. During the trial, he was the most active member of this body, insisting on the use of the death penalty against them. The panel sentenced the defendants, including Mikhail Tukhachevsky, to death on June 11, 1937.

As the Great Purge continued, Alksnis was arrested by the NKVD as a part of the so-called "Latvian Operation" on 23 November 1937, expelled from the Communist Party, charged with setting up a "Latvian fascist organization". On November 25, after being subjected to torture, he signed a statement that he had been a Latvian spy since 1935. He later "remembered" that he had been a spy since 1922 and that he had also been a member since 1936 of a counter-revolutionary "Latvian Nationalist Organization in the Red Army". Alksnis admitted his guilt at the trial. On July 28, 1938, the Military Collegium of the Supreme Court of the USSR convicted him of participating in a military conspiracy under Article 58-1 "b", paragraphs 8 and 11 of the Criminal Code of the RSFSR and sentenced him to death. He was shot on 29 July 1938 at the Kommunarka shooting ground.

His wife, researcher Kristina Karlovna Alksnis-Mednis, spent eight years in a labor camp, which she served in Temlag. After her release, she lived in Riga from 1946 to 1949, but was then arrested again and was exiled to the Kemerovo region until 1954.

During the destalinization of the late 1950s, Alksnis was posthumously rehabilitated; the Air Forces college in Riga was named in his honour. Viktor Alksnis (1950–2025), grandson of Yakov Alksnis, was a far left-wing Russian politician remembered for his pro-Union activities of the late 1980s and early 1990s.
