= Polish Operation of the NKVD =

1937–38 Soviet ethnic cleansing of Poles

- Part of the Great Purge
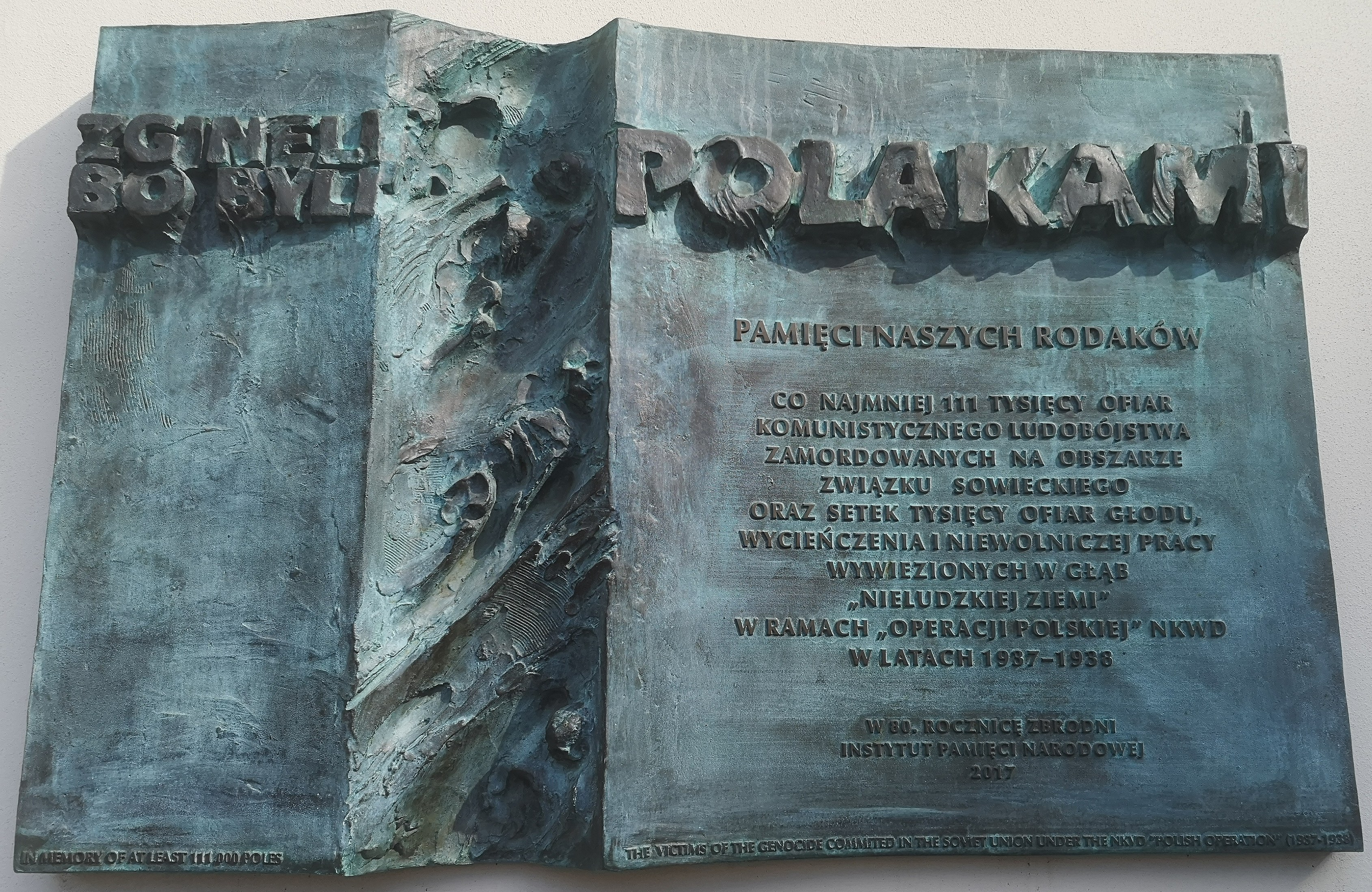
- Memorial in Kraków
- Location: Soviet Union, modern-day Russia, Ukraine, Belarus, Kazakhstan and others
- Date: 1937–1938
- Target: Poles
- Attack type: Prison shootings, ethnic cleansing
- Deaths: c. 111,091
- Victims: 22% of the Polish population of the Soviet Union was "sentenced" by the operation (140,000 people)
- Perpetrators: Nikolai Yezhov (NKVD), Joseph Stalin

The Polish Operation of the NKVD (Soviet security service) in 1937–1938 was an anti-Polish mass-ethnic cleansing operation of the NKVD carried out in the Soviet Union against Poles (labeled by the Soviets as "agents") during the period of the Great Purge. It was ordered by the Politburo of the Communist Party against so-called "Polish spies" and customarily interpreted by NKVD officials as relating to 'absolutely all Poles'. It resulted in the sentencing of 139,835 people, and summary executions of 111,091 Poles living in or near the Soviet Union. The operation was implemented according to NKVD Order No. 00485 signed by Nikolai Yezhov.

The majority of the shooting victims were ethnically Polish, but not all, with some belonging to various minority groups from the Kresy macro-region, for instance, Ruthenians; these groups in the Soviet worldview had some element of Polish culture or heritage, and were therefore also "Polish". The NKVD agents looked through local phone books to expedite the procedure and detained people with names that sounded Polish.

While similar to other operations such as the Greek Operation, Finnish Operation, Latvian Operation and Estonian Operation, the Polish Operation was the largest ethnic shooting and deportation action during the Great Purge campaign of political murders in the Soviet Union. According to official data, victims of the Polish Operation accounted for 41.7% of the sentenced people and 44.9% of the executed people during all such ethnic operations.

== NKVD Order No. 00485 ==
The top secret NKVD Order No. 00485, titled "On the liquidation of the Polish diversionist and espionage groups and POW units," was approved on August 9, 1937 by the Party's Central Committee Politburo, and was signed by Nikolai Yezhov on August 11, 1937. It was distributed to the local subdivisions of the NKVD simultaneously with Yezhov's thirty-page "secret letter", explaining what the "Polish operation" was all about. The letter from Yezhov was titled, "On fascist-resurrectionist, spying, diversional, defeationist, and terrorist activity of Polish intelligence in the USSR". Joseph Stalin was approving of the operation saying "'Very good! Dig up and purge this Polish espionage mud in the future as well. Destroy it in the interest of the USSR.."

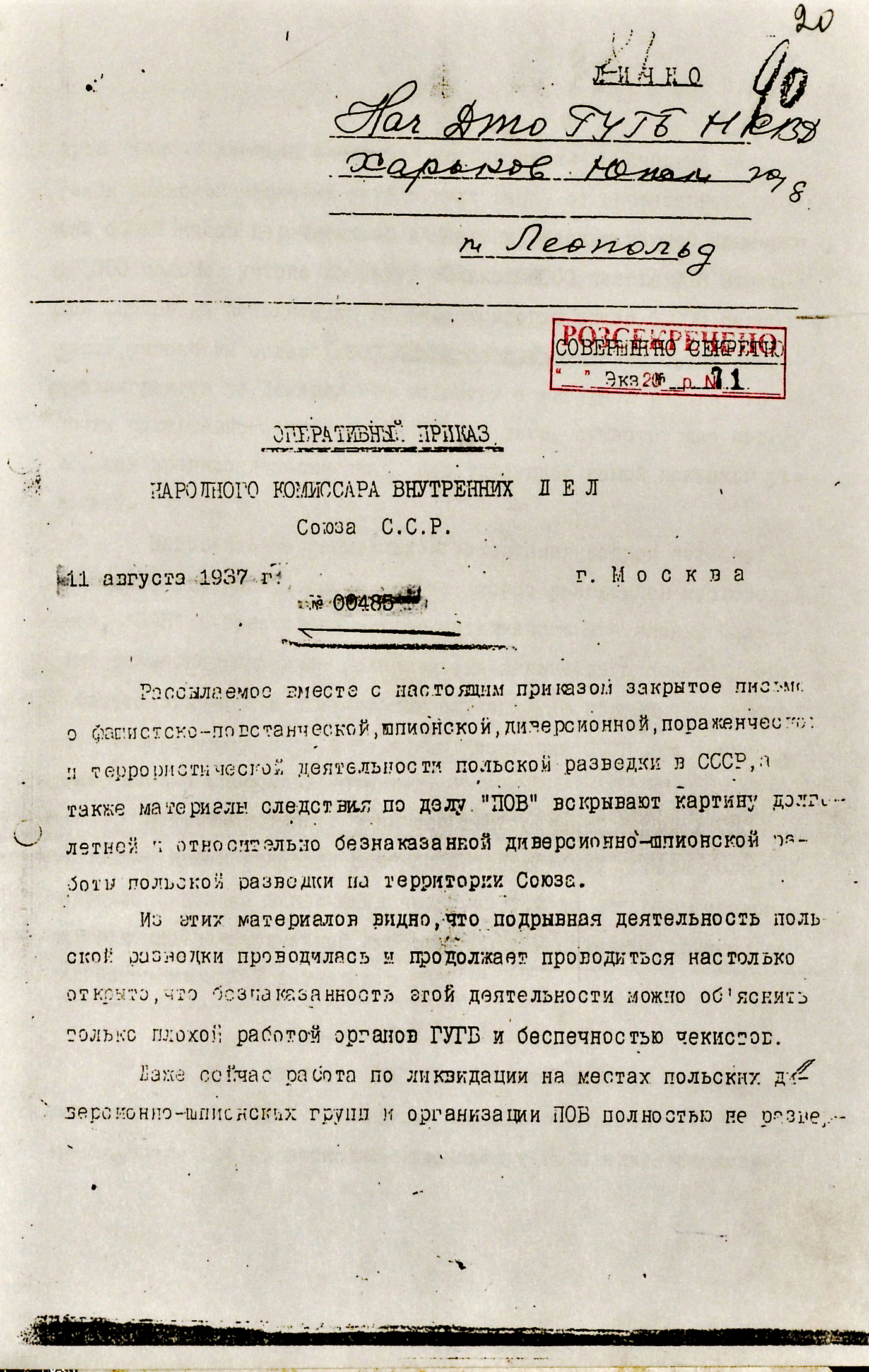
First page of one of the copies of the Order No. 00485, archived by the Kharkov branch of the NKVD

The "Order" adopted the simplified so-called "album procedure" (as it was called in NKVD circles). The long lists of Poles condemned by a lower NKVD organ (so-called dvoika, a two-man team) during early meetings, were then collected into "albums" and sent to the midrange NKVD offices for a stamp of approval by a troika (a three-man team; a communist official, NKVD leader, and party procurator). Poles were the first ever major Soviet population group to be sentenced in this manner. After the approval of the entire "album", the executions were carried out immediately. This procedure was also used later on in other mass operations of the NKVD.

The "Polish Operation" was a second in a series of national operations of the NKVD, carried out by the Soviet Union against ethnic groups including Latvian, Finnish, German, and Romanian, based on a theory about an internal enemy (i.e., the fifth column), labelled as the "hostile capitalist surrounding" residing along its western borders. In the opinion of historian Timothy Snyder, this fabricated justification was intended only to cover-up the state-sanctioned campaign of mass-murder aiming to eradicate Poles as a national (and linguistic) minority group. Another possible cause, according to Snyder, might have sprung from the necessity to explain the Holodomor, the Soviet-made famine in Ukraine, which required a political scapegoat. A top Soviet official, Vsevolod Balitsky, chose the Polish Military Organization which was disbanded in 1921. The NKVD declared that it continued to exist. Some Soviet Poles were tortured in order to confess to its existence, and denounce other individuals as spies. Meanwhile, the Communist International helped by revisiting its files in search of Polish members, producing another bountiful source of made-up evidence.

== Targets of the operation ==
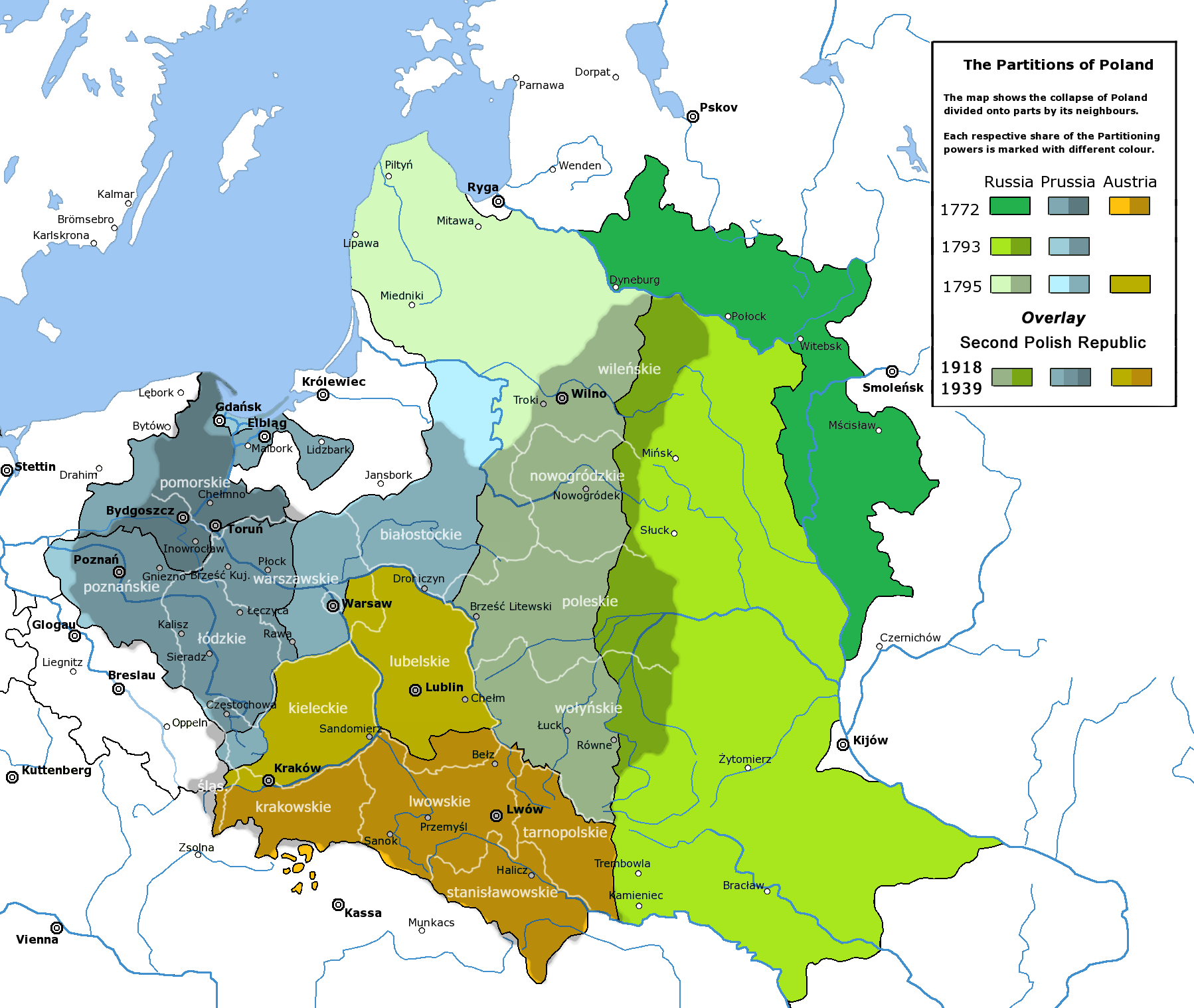
Outline of the Second Polish Republic on the map of the Partitions of Poland. Most territories annexed by the Russian Empire by 1793 (in shades of green) remained in the Soviet Union after the Treaty of Riga of 1921.

The operation took place approximately from August 25, 1937, to November 15, 1938. The largest group of people with a Polish background, around 40 percent of all victims, came from Soviet Ukraine, especially from the districts near the border with Poland. Among them were tens of thousands of peasants, railway workers, industrial labourers, engineers and others. An additional 17 percent of victims came from Soviet Byelorussia. The rest came from around Western Siberia and Kazakhstan, where exiled Poles had lived since the Partitions of Poland, as well as from the southern Urals, northern Caucasus and the rest of Siberia, including the Far East.

The following categories of people were arrested by the NKVD during its Polish Operation, as described in Soviet documents:

1. All "antisoviet and nationalistic elements" from districts and region in the USSR where there existed a Polish community.
2. All immigrants from the Second Polish Republic.
3. Political exiles from Poland.
4. Former and present members of the Polish Socialist Party and other non-communist Polish political parties.
5. All prisoners of war from the Polish-Soviet war remaining in the Soviet Union.
6. Members of the Polish Military Organisation listed in the special list.
7. All "clerical elements" having, or having had, some kind of connection with Poland.

== Ethnic breakdown ==
Although the Soviet authorities claim that the executed victims were all ethnic Poles, some of those killed were also ethnic Belarusians, Jews, Ukrainians and Russians mistaken and alleged for being ethnic Poles due to their surnames or religious denominations. 47.3% of the total number of "Poles" who were arrested in Belarus were actually ethnic Belarusian Catholics, of whom many declared themselves to be Poles in the 1920s. They made up 14.2% of those arrested in the Polish Operation across the Soviet Union (September–November 1938). 13.4% of those arrested were ethnic Ukrainians. 8.8% of the arrested were ethnic Russians.

== Killing process and death toll ==
According to archives of the NKVD, 111,091 Poles and people accused of ties with Poland, were sentenced to death, and 28,744 were sentenced to labor camps; 139,835 victims in total. This number constitutes 10% of the total number of people officially convicted during the Yezhovshchina period, based on confirming NKVD documents.

According to historian Bogdan Musiał: "It is estimated that Polish losses in the Ukrainian SSR were about 30%, while in the Belorussian SSR... the Polish minority was almost completely annihilated or deported." Musiał is also of the opinion that "it does not seem unlikely, as Soviet statistics indicate, that the number of Poles dropped from 792,000 in 1926 to 627,000 in 1939."

Almost all victims of the NKVD shootings were men, wrote Michał Jasiński, most with families. Their wives and children were dealt with by the NKVD Order No. 00486. The women were generally sentenced to deportation to Kazakhstan for an average of 5 to 10 years. Orphaned children without relatives willing to take them were put in orphanages to be brought up as Soviet, with no knowledge of their origins. All possessions of the accused were confiscated. The parents of the executed men – as well as their in-laws – were left with nothing to live on, which usually sealed their fate as well. Statistical extrapolation, wrote Jasiński, increases the number of Polish victims in 1937–1938 to around 200–250,000 depending on the size of their families.

In Leningrad, the NKVD reviewed local telephone books and arrested almost 7,000 citizens with Polish-sounding name with the vast majority of such nominal "suspects" were executed within 10 days of arrest.

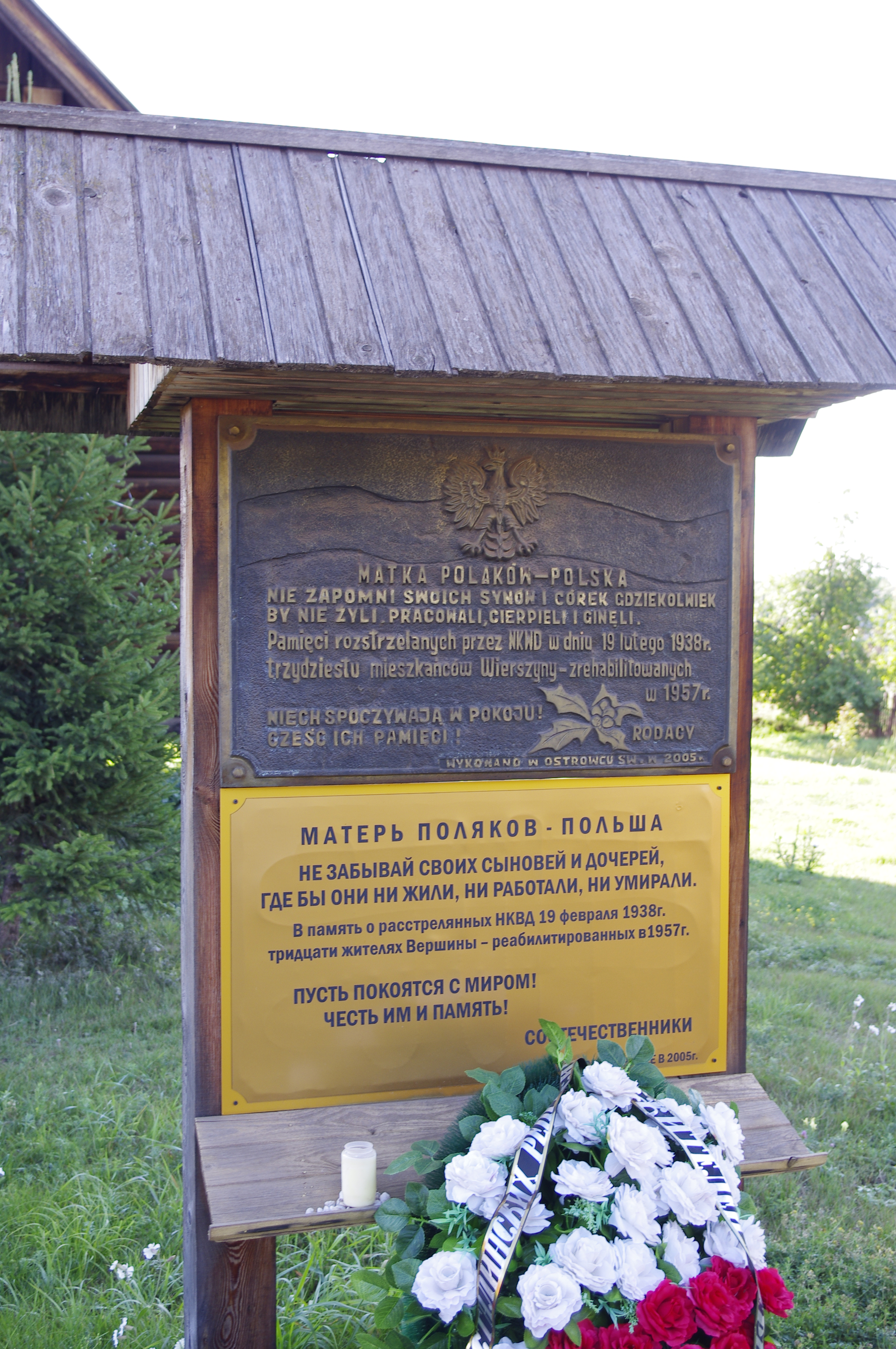
Memorial to 30 Poles of Vershina, executed on 19 February 1938

The Polish-majority villages of Siberia were also targeted. In Belostok, Tomsk Oblast, 100 men of Polish origins were executed and their bodies thrown into the Ob River. In Polozovo, Tomsk Oblast 33 Poles were arrested, of which 32 were executed and one died in captivity, and in Vershina 30 Poles were arrested (29 men and one woman), of which one person died during transport to Irkutsk and the rest were executed there.

The small Polish communities of the more remote parts of the USSR were also targeted in the Polish Operation. According to the former secret police archives in Tbilisi, Georgia alone, at least 89 people were victims of the Polish Operation, and further 125 Poles were victims of other concurrent operations, whereas, according to Kyrgyz archives, at least 180 Poles fell victim to all simultaneous operations of the Great Purge in Kyrgyzstan.

== Assessment ==
According to historian Michael Ellman, "The 'national operations' of 1937–38, notably the 'Polish operation', may qualify as genocide as defined by the UN Convention, although there is as yet no legal ruling on the matter". Karol Karski argues that the Soviet actions against Poles are genocide according to international law. He says that while the extermination was targeting other nationalities as well, and according to the criteria other than ethnicity, but as long as Poles were singled out based on their ethnicity, that makes the actions to be genocide. The historian Terry Martin refers to the "national operations", including the "Polish Operation", as ethnic cleansing and "ethnic terror". According to Martin, the singling out of diaspora nationalities for arrest and mass execution "verged on the genocidal". Historian Timothy Snyder called the Polish Operation genocidal: "It is hard not to see the Soviet "Polish Operation" of 1937-38 as genocidal: Polish fathers were shot, Polish mothers sent to Kazakhstan, and Polish children left in orphanages where they would lose their Polish identity. As more than 100,000 innocent people were killed on the spurious grounds that theirs was a disloyal ethnicity, Stalin spoke of "Polish filth". On the other hand, Stalin often praised Poland as a good nation and the Poles as brave fighters, the third most "dogged" soldiers after the Russians and Germans. Norman Naimark called Stalin's policy towards Poles in the 1930s "genocidal" but did not consider the entire Great Purge genocidal since it targeted political opponents as well. Simon Sebag Montefiore presents a similar opinion.

According to historians Olle Sundström and Andrej Kotljarchuk, most scholars (for example, Nicolas Werth, Michael Mann and Hiroaki Kuromiya) focus on the security dilemma in the border areas suggesting the need to secure the ethnic integrity of Soviet space vis-à-vis neighboring capitalistic enemy states. They stress the role of international relations and believe that representatives of ethnic minorities such as the Poles, were killed not because of their ethnicity, but because of their possible relations to countries hostile to the USSR and fear of disloyalty in the case of an invasion.

== See also ==
- Anti-Polish sentiment
- Soviet war crimes
- Soviet repressions of Polish citizens (1939–1946)
- Gestapo–NKVD conferences (1939–1940)
- Katyn massacre
- Genocides in history
- Kengir uprising
- Flight of Poles from the USSR
- Birch bark letters from Siberia
