= Decree about Arrests, Prosecutor Supervision and Course of Investigation =

Decree formally ending the Great Purge of the Soviet Union

The Decree about Arrests, Prosecutor Supervision and Course of Investigation No. 81 was issued jointly by the Sovnarkom and Central Committee of the Communist Party of the Soviet Union (undersigned by Molotov and Stalin) on November 17, 1938.

It officially marked the end of the Great Purge.

The decree declared that during 1936-1938 NKVD did a good job in cleansing the country of numerous "spies, terrorists, diversionists and wreckers <...> which provided a significant support for foreign intelligencies in the USSR..." The decree further noted that NKVD was both sloppy and the same time overzealous and put the blame on the "enemies of the people" who infiltrated NKVD. The decree formally banned Mass operations of the NKVD and ordered the strict accordance to the codes of criminal procedure and the supervision of the NKVD investigations by prosecutors.

The order of the implementation of the Decree was detailed in the NKVD Order No. 00762 (Приказ НКВД СССР № 00762 «О порядке осуществления постановления СНК СССР и ЦК ВКП(б) от 17 ноября 1938 г.»).
