= Estonian Operation of the NKVD =

Mass arrests and executions of Estonians in the USSR

- Part of the mass operations of the NKVD during the Great Purge
- Location: Soviet Union
- Date: 1937–1938
- Target: Estonians
- Attack type: Ethnic cleansing Prison shootings
- Deaths: 4,672
- Perpetrator: Soviet NKVD

The Estonian Operation of the NKVD was a mass arrest, execution and deportations of persons of Estonian origin in the Soviet Union by the NKVD during the period of Great Purge (1937–1938). A total of 5,680 were sentenced during the repression, of which 4,672 were sentenced to death. It was a part of the series of mass operations of the NKVD, which targeted many minority nationalities in the Soviet Union.
