= NKVD Order No. 00447 =

Top secret order issued by the Soviet Ministry of Internal Affairs

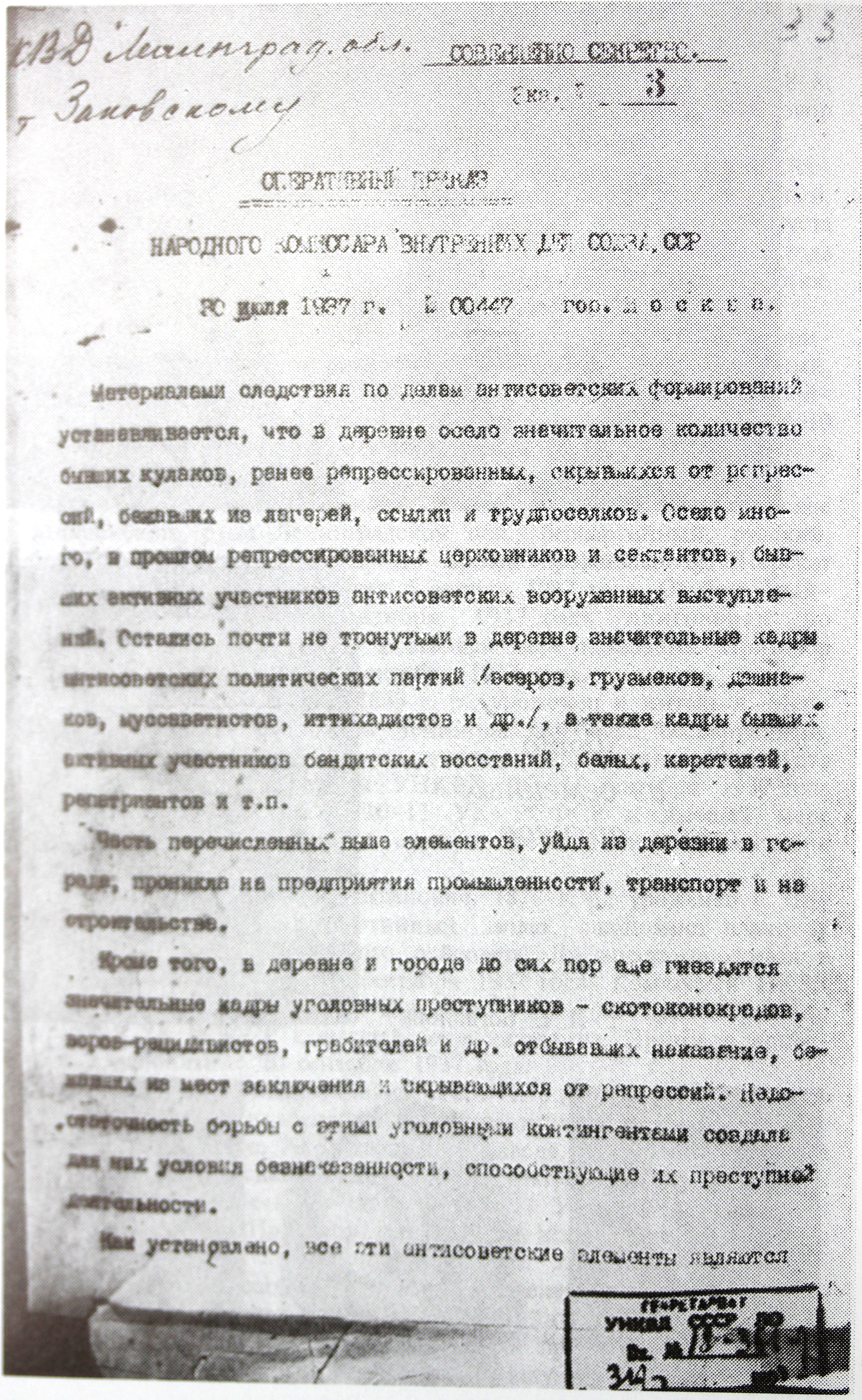
An excerpt of NKVD Order No. 00447

NKVD Order No. 00447 (Note: Russian: О операции по репрессированию бывших кулаков, уголовников и других антисоветских элементов, romanized: O operatsii po repressirovaniyu byvshikh kulakov, ugolovnikov i drugikh antisovetskikh elementov, lit. 'About operation to repress former kulaks, criminals, and other anti-Soviet elements') of July 30, 1937 was signed by Nikolai Yezhov and approved by the Politburo during the Great Purge.

To execute this order, numerous NKVD troikas were created on republican and various regional levels (krai and oblast). Investigation was to be performed by operative groups "in a speedy and simplified way" and the results were to be delivered to troikas for trials.

The chairman of a troika was the chief of the corresponding territorial subdivision of NKVD (People's Commissar of a republican NKVD, etc.). Usually a troika included the prosecutor of the republic/krai/oblast in question; if not, he or she was allowed to be present at the session of a troika. The third person was usually the Communist Party secretary of the corresponding regional level. The staff of these troikas were personally specified in the Order No. 00447.

Protocols of a troika session were passed to the corresponding operative group for executions of sentences. Times and places of executions of death sentences were ordered to be held in secret.

That same order instructed to classify kulaks and other anti-Soviet elements into two categories: the First category (Category I) of repressed was subject to death by shooting, the Second category (Category II) was to be sent to GULAG correctional-labor camps. The order also set upper limits per territory and category of social classes (proletariat, peasant, kulak, bourgeois, others).

For example, the Byelorussian SSR was estimated to have 2,000 (Cat. I) and 10,000 (Cat. II), a total of 12,000 anti-Soviet social elements. It was specifically stressed that limits were estimates and could not be exceeded without personal approval of Yezhov. In practice this approval was easy to obtain, and eventually these initial limits were exceeded by orders of magnitude.

One instance on July 23, 1938, the Omsk NKVD chief named Gorbach requested an increased limit of thousands of more executions, since his men had already fulfilled their plan. The request was approved by Stalin personally, who promoted Gorbach to a larger district. By the autumn of 1937, the pressure to achieve arrests was so great that the NKVD interrogators began picking out names from the telephone directory or preselecting married men with children who, as every agent knew, were the quickest to confess. Within 1939, the system of repression was bursting at the seams—one tenth of the population might be arrested, but not half.

After this Order, the terms First/Second Category became standard abbreviations in NKVD documentation for "the highest measure of punishment" and "placing into corrective labor camps", respectively.

The article III the Order of Conducting the Operation instructed to start the action for securing the anti-Soviet social elements on August 5, 1937, and finish it in four-month term.

The implementation was swift. By August 15, 1937, 101,000 were arrested and 14,000 convicted. By the end of 1938, the NKVD had executed 386,798 Soviet citizens to fulfil order 00447.
