= NKVD Order No. 00439 =

1937 Soviet order to arrest German citizens

NKVD Order № 00439, signed by Nikolai Yezhov on July 25, 1937, was the basis for the German operation of the NKVD in 1937–1938. The operation was the first in the series of national operations of the NKVD.

The order commanded to arrest citizens of Germany, as well as former German citizens who assumed the Soviet citizenship. German citizens who worked at railways and defense enterprises were qualified as "penetrated agents of the German General Staff and Gestapo", ready for diversion activity "during the war period" (N.B.: the war was considered imminent).

During the first month of the operation, 472 persons were arrested; the total number was around 800 persons, or about 20% of the whole number of registered German citizens at the time.

The order also instructed to be prepared for the second wave of repressions against Soviet citizens of German ethnicity. Indeed, the national operation against Soviet citizens of German descent resulted in the sentencing of at least 55,005 persons, including 41,898 sentenced to death.

== See also ==
- Anti-German sentiment
- Flight and expulsion of Germans (1944–50)
- 1939 Molotov–Ribbentrop Pact
