= Great Purge =

1936–1939 campaign in the Soviet Union

- Part of the Bolshevik Party purges
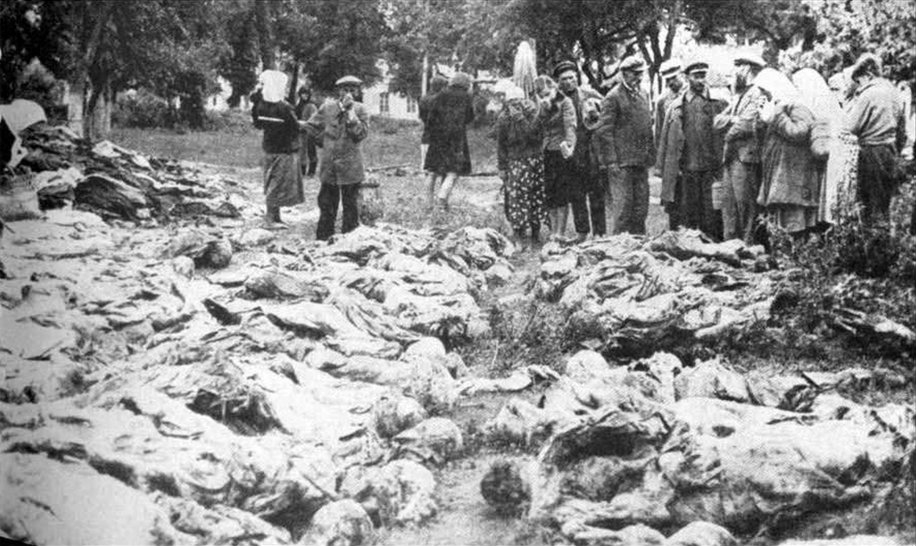
- Residents searching for relatives among the exhumed victims of the Vinnytsia massacre, 1943
- Location: Soviet Union, Republic of China (Sinkiang clique), Mongolian People's Republic, Tannu Tuva, Second Spanish Republic
- Date: Main phase: 9 March 1936 – 10 January 1939 (2 years, 10 months and 1 day)
- Target: Political opponents, Trotskyists, Red Army leadership, kulaks, religious activists and leaders
- Attack type: Mass murder, political repression, ethnic cleansing, summary executions
- Deaths: 681,692 executions and 116,000 deaths in the Gulag system (official figures); 700,000 to 1.2 million (estimated)
- Perpetrators: Joseph Stalin, the NKVD (Genrikh Yagoda, Nikolai Yezhov, Lavrentiy Beria, Ivan Serov and others), Vyacheslav Molotov, Andrey Vyshinsky, Lazar Kaganovich, Kliment Voroshilov, Robert Eikhe, Vartan Ter-Oganezov, and others
- Motive: Elimination of political opponents, consolidation of power, fear of counterrevolution, fear of party infiltration

The Great Purge or Great Terror (Russian: Большой террор, romanized: Bol'shoy terror), also known as the Year of '37 (37-й год, Tridtsat' sed'moy god) and the Yezhovshchina (ежовщина [(j)ɪˈʐofɕːɪnə], lit. 'period of Yezhov'), was a political purge in the Soviet Union from 1936 to 1939. After the assassination of Sergei Kirov by Leonid Nikolaev in 1934, Joseph Stalin launched a series of show trials known as the Moscow trials to remove suspected dissenters from the Communist Party of the Soviet Union (especially those aligned with the Bolshevik party).

The purges were largely conducted by the NKVD (People's Commissariat for Internal Affairs), which functioned as the interior ministry and secret police of the USSR. In 1936, the NKVD under Genrikh Yagoda began the removal of the central party leadership, Old Bolsheviks, government officials, and regional party bosses. Soviet politicians who opposed or criticized Stalin were removed from office and imprisoned, or executed, by the NKVD, including Nikolai Bukharin, Lev Kamenev, and Grigory Zinoviev. The purges were eventually expanded to the Red Army high command, which had a disastrous effect on the military, including Marshal of the Soviet Union Mikhail Tukhachevsky. The campaigns also affected many other segments of society: the intelligentsia, wealthy peasants—especially those lending money or other wealth (kulaks)—and professionals sometimes in the form of specialist-baiting. As the scope of the purge widened, the omnipresent suspicion of saboteurs and counter-revolutionaries (known collectively as wreckers) began affecting civilian life.

The purge reached its peak between September 1936 and August 1938, when the NKVD was under chief Nikolai Yezhov (hence the name Yezhovshchina). The campaigns were carried out according to the general line of the party, often by direct orders by the Politburo headed by Stalin. Hundreds of thousands of people were accused of political crimes, including espionage, wrecking, sabotage, anti-Soviet agitation, and conspiracies to prepare uprisings and coups. They were executed by shooting, or sent to Gulag labor camps. The NKVD targeted certain ethnic minorities with particular force (such as Volga Germans or Soviet citizens of Polish origin), who were subjected to forced deportation and extreme repression. Throughout the purge, the NKVD sought to strengthen control over civilians through fear and frequently used imprisonment, torture, violent interrogation, and executions during its mass operations.

Stalin reversed his stance on the purges in 1938, criticizing the NKVD for carrying out mass executions and overseeing the execution of NKVD chiefs Yagoda and Yezhov. Scholars estimate the death toll of the Great Purge at 700,000 to 1.2 million. Despite the end of the purge, widespread surveillance and an atmosphere of mistrust continued for decades. Similar purges took place in Mongolia and Xinjiang. The Soviet government wanted to put Leon Trotsky on trial during the purge, but his exile prevented this. Trotsky survived the purge, but was assassinated in 1940 by the NKVD in Mexico on orders from Stalin.

== Background ==
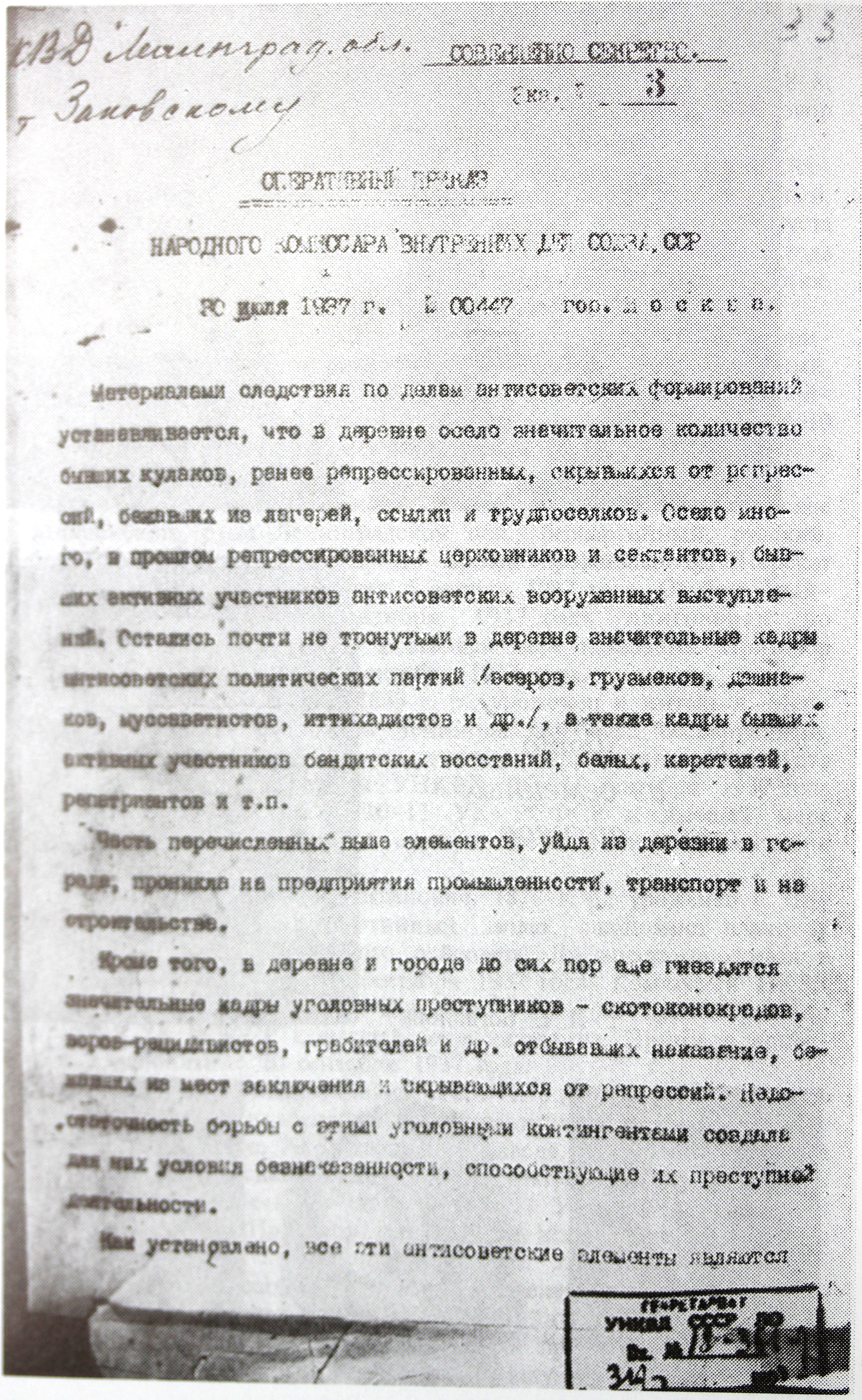
Excerpt from NKVD Order No. 00447

A power vacuum developed in the Communist Party, the ruling party in the Soviet Union (USSR), after Vladimir Lenin's death in 1924; established figures in Lenin's government attempted to succeed him. Joseph Stalin, the party's general secretary, triumphed over his opponents by 1928 and gained control of the party. Initially, Stalin's leadership was widely accepted; Trotsky, his main political adversary, was forced into exile in 1929 and Stalin's doctrine of "socialism in one country" became party policy. Party officials began to lose faith in his leadership in the early 1930s, however, largely due to the human cost of the first five-year plan and the collectivization of agriculture (including the Holodomor famine in Ukraine).

In 1930, the party and police officials feared the "social disorder" caused by the upheavals of forced collectivization of peasants, the resulting famine of 1930–1933 and the massive, uncontrolled migration of millions of peasants to cities. The threat of war heightened Stalin's (and Soviet) perception of marginal and politically suspect populations as potential sources of an uprising during a possible invasion. Stalin began to plan for the preventive elimination of potential recruits for a "fifth column of wreckers, terrorists and spies".

The term "purge" in Soviet political slang was an abbreviation of the expression "purge from the party ranks"; in 1933, for example, the party expelled about 400,000 people. The term changed its meaning between 1936 and 1953, and being expelled from the party came to mean almost-certain arrest, imprisonment, and (often) execution.

The political purge was primarily an effort by Stalin to eliminate challenges from past and potential opposition groups, including the party's left and right wings (led by Trotsky and Nikolai Bukharin, respectively). After the Civil War and the late-1920s reconstruction of the Soviet economy, veteran Bolsheviks thought that the "temporary" wartime dictatorship (which had passed from Lenin to Stalin) was no longer necessary. Stalin's opponents in the Communist Party chided him as undemocratic and lax about bureaucratic corruption.

Opposition to the leadership may have accumulated substantial support from the working class by attacking the privileges and luxuries the state offered its highly-paid elite, and the Ryutin affair seemed to vindicate Stalin's suspicions. Martemyan Ryutin was working with a large, secret Opposition Bloc with Trotsky and Grigory Zinoviev, which led to their deaths. Stalin enforced a ban on party factions and demoted party members who had opposed him, ending democratic centralism.

In the new party organization, the Politburo (and Stalin in particular) were the sole dispensers of ideology. This required the elimination of all Marxists with different views, especially the prestigious "old guard" of revolutionaries. As the purges began, the government (through the NKVD) shot Bolshevik heroes—including Mikhail Tukhachevsky and Béla Kun—and most of Lenin's Politburo for disagreements about policy. The NKVD attacked the supporters, friends, and family of these "heretical" Marxists, in Russia and abroad. It nearly annihilated Trotsky's family before killing him in Mexico; NKVD agent Ramón Mercader was part of an assassination task force assembled by special agent Pavel Sudoplatov under Stalin's orders.

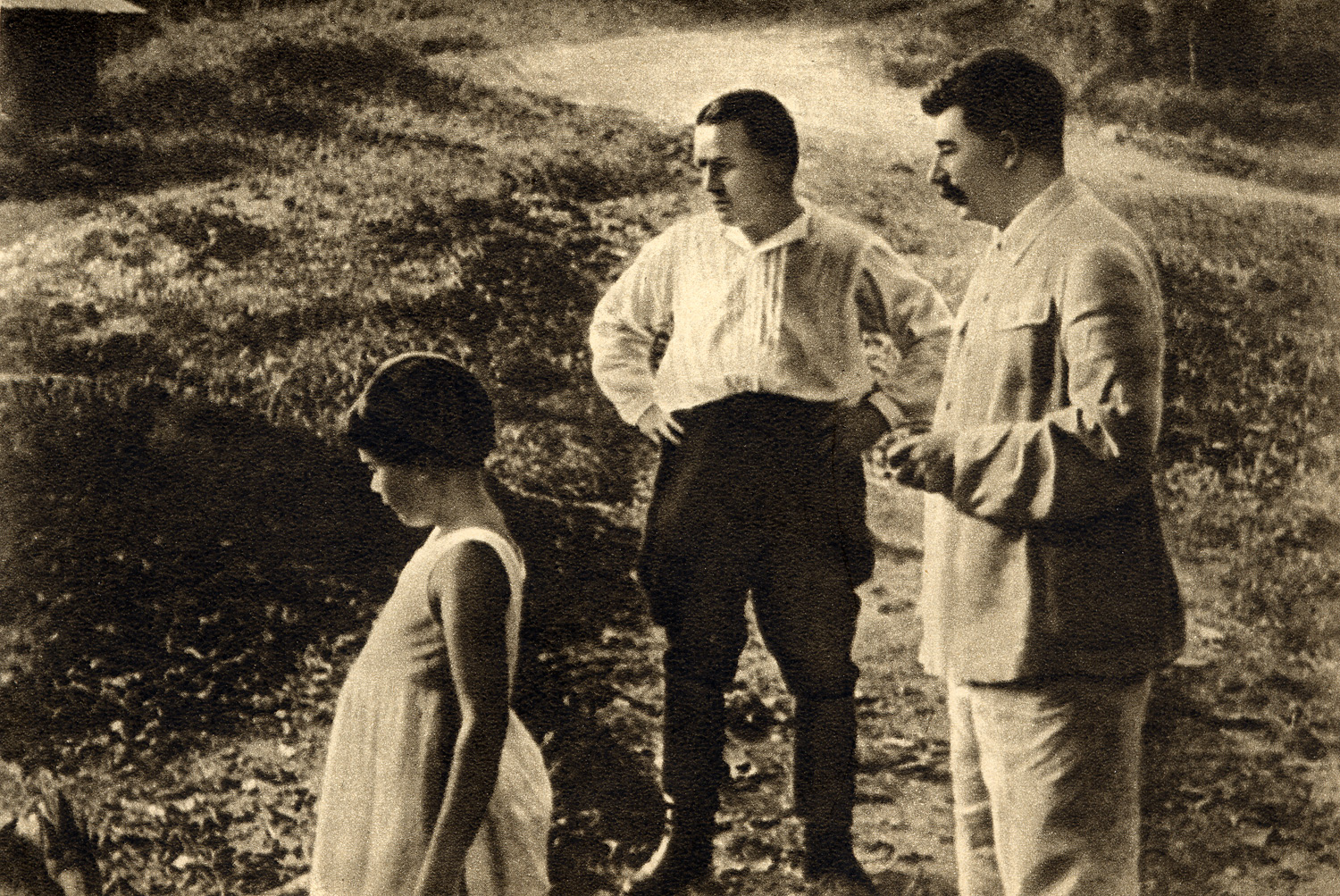
Leningrad party leader Sergei Kirov with Stalin and his daughter, Svetlana, in 1934

By 1934, several of Stalin's rivals (such as Trotsky) began calling for Stalin's removal and attempted to break his control of the party. In an atmosphere of doubt and suspicion, the popular high-ranking official Sergei Kirov was assassinated. The NKVD initially did not want to help investigate the December 1934 assassination, however Yagoda eventually led an investigation that revealed a network of party members supposedly working against Stalin, including several of his rivals. Many of those arrested after Kirov's murder, high-ranking party officials among them, also admitted (often under duress) plans to kill Stalin themselves. The confessions' validity is debated by historians, but consensus exists that Kirov's death was the flashpoint when Stalin decided to take action and begin the purges. Some later historians came to believe that Stalin arranged Kirov's murder, or that sufficient evidence existed to reach such a conclusion. Kirov was a staunch Stalin loyalist, but Stalin may have viewed him as a potential rival because of his emerging popularity among moderates. The 1934 Party Congress elected Kirov to the central committee with only three opposing votes against, the fewest of any candidate; Stalin received 292 opposing votes. After Kirov's assassination, the NKVD charged the increasingly large group of former Stalin opponents with Kirov's murder and a growing list of other offenses which included treason, terrorism, sabotage, and espionage.

Another justification for the purge was to remove any possible "fifth column" in case of war. Vyacheslav Molotov and Lazar Kaganovich, participants in the repression as members of the Politburo, maintained this justification throughout the purge and each signed many death lists. Stalin believed that war was imminent, threatened by an explicitly hostile Germany and an expansionist Japan. The Soviet press portrayed the USSR as threatened from within by fascist spies.

During and after the October Revolution, Lenin used repression against perceived (and legitimate) enemies of the Bolsheviks as a systematic method of instilling fear and facilitating control of the population in a campaign known as the Red Terror. The campaign was relaxed as the Russian Civil War drew to a close although the secret police remained active. From 1924 to 1928, mass repression—including incarceration in the Gulag system—fell significantly.

Stalin had defeated his political opponents and gained full control of the party by 1929, and organized a committee to begin the process of industrializing the Soviet Union. Backlash against industrialization and the collectivization of agriculture escalated, which prompted Stalin to increase police presence in rural areas. Soviet authorities increased repression against the kulaks (wealthy peasants who owned farmland) in a policy known as dekulakization. The kulaks responded by destroying crops and other acts of sabotage against the Soviet government. The resulting food shortage led to a mass famine across the USSR and slowed the Five Year Plan.

A distinctive feature of the Great Purge was that, for the first time, members of the ruling party were included on a massive scale as victims of the repression. In addition to ordinary citizens, prominent members of the Communist Party were also targets of the purges. The purge of the party was accompanied by a purge of society. Soviet historians divide the Great Purge into three corresponding trials, and the following events are used for demarcation:

- 1936: The first Moscow trial
- 1937: Introduction of NKVD troikas for implementation of "revolutionary justice"
- 1937: Passage of Article 58-14 about "counter-revolutionary sabotage"
- 1937: The second Moscow trial
- 1937: The military purge
- 1938: the third Moscow trial.

== Moscow trials ==
=== First and second Moscow trials ===
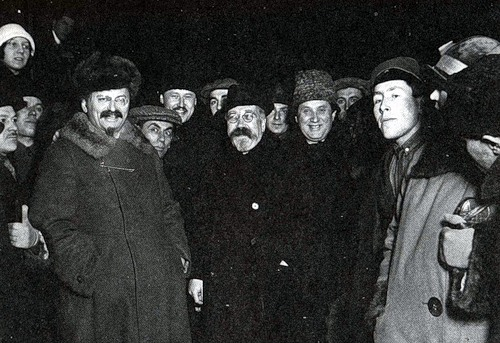
Bolshevik revolutionaries Leon Trotsky, Lev Kamenev, and Grigory Zinoviev

Between 1936 and 1938, three large Moscow trials of former senior Communist Party leaders were held in which they were accused of conspiring with fascist and capitalist powers to assassinate Stalin and other Soviet leaders, dismember the Soviet Union and restore capitalism. The trials were highly publicized and extensively covered by the outside world. In the Moscow trials, which Stalin used to eliminate his opponents, forced confessions helped to obtain convictions. Trotsky was tried in absentia, and was sentenced to death for treason. Historians have found no evidence to support the charge.

The first trial, of 16 members of the "Trotskyite-Kamenevite-Zinovievite-Leftist-Counter-Revolutionary Bloc", was held in August 1936. The chief defendants were Grigory Zinoviev and Lev Kamenev, two of the most prominent former party leaders who had been members of an opposition bloc that opposed Stalin (although its activities were exaggerated). Among other accusations, they were charged with the assassination of Kirov and plotting to kill Stalin. After confessing to the charges, all were sentenced to death and executed. The second trial, in January 1937, involved 17 lesser figures known as the "anti-Soviet Trotskyite-centre". The group (which included Karl Radek, Yuri Piatakov and Grigory Sokolnikov) was accused of plotting with Trotsky, who was said to be conspiring with Germany. Thirteen of the defendants were eventually shot; the rest received sentences in labor camps, where they soon died. There was also a secret military tribunal of a group of Red Army commanders, including Mikhail Tukhachevsky, in June 1937.

It is now known that the confessions were obtained only after great psychological pressure and torture. The methods used to extract the confessions are known from the accounts of former OGPU officer Alexander Orlov and others, and included repeated beatings, simulated drownings, making prisoners stand or go without sleep for days on end, and threats to arrest and execute the prisoners' families; Kamenev's teenage son was arrested and charged with terrorism. After months of such interrogation, the defendants were driven to despair and exhaustion.

Zinoviev and Kamenev demanded, as a condition for "confessing", a guarantee from the Politburo that their lives and that of their families and followers would be spared. The offer was accepted, but only Stalin, Kliment Voroshilov, and Yezhov were present at the Politburo meeting. Stalin said that they were a "commission" authorized by the Politburo, and gave assurances that death sentences would not be carried out. After the trial, Stalin broke his promise to spare the defendants and had most of their relatives arrested and shot.

==== Dewey Commission ====
In May 1937, the Commission of Inquiry into the Charges Made against Leon Trotsky in the Moscow Trials (commonly known as the Dewey Commission) was set up in the United States by supporters of Trotsky to establish the truth about the trials. The commission was headed by the American philosopher and educator John Dewey. Although the hearings were conducted to prove Trotsky's innocence, they brought to light evidence which established that some of the charges made at the trials could not be true.

Georgy Pyatakov testified that he had flown to Oslo in December 1935 to "receive terrorist instructions" from Trotsky. The Dewey Commission established that no such flight took place. Another defendant, Ivan Smirnov, admitted taking part in the assassination of Sergei Kirov in December 1934 (when Smirnov had been in prison for a year).

The Dewey Commission published its findings in a 422-page book entitled Not Guilty. Its conclusions asserted the innocence of all those condemned in the Moscow trials. In its summary, the commission wrote:

Independent of extrinsic evidence, the Commission finds:

- That the conduct of the Moscow Trials was such as to convince any unprejudiced person that no attempt was made to ascertain the truth.
- That while confessions are necessarily entitled to the most serious consideration, the confessions themselves contain such inherent improbabilities as to convince the Commission that they do not represent the truth, irrespective of any means used to obtain them.
- That Trotsky never instructed any of the accused or witnesses in the Moscow trials to enter into agreements with foreign powers against the Soviet Union [and] that Trotsky never recommended, plotted, or attempted the restoration of capitalism in the USSR.

The commission concluded: "We therefore find the Moscow Trials to be frame-ups."

==== Implication of the Rightists ====
In the second trial, Karl Radek testified that there was a "third organization separate from the cadres which had passed through [Trotsky's] school", and "semi-Trotskyites, quarter-Trotskyites, one-eighth-Trotskyites, people who helped us, not knowing of the terrorist organization but sympathizing with us, people who from liberalism, from a Fronde against the Party, gave us this help".

By the "third organization", he meant the Rightists led by Bukharin (whom he implicated):

I feel guilty of one thing more: even after admitting my guilt and exposing the organization, I stubbornly refused to give evidence about Bukharin. I knew that Bukharin's situation was just as hopeless as my own, because our guilt, if not juridically, then in essence, was the same. But we are close friends, and intellectual friendship is stronger than other friendships. I knew that Bukharin was in the same state of upheaval as myself. That is why I did not want to deliver him bound hand and foot to the People's Commissariat of Home Affairs. Just as in relation to our other cadres, I wanted Bukharin himself to lay down his arms.

=== Third Moscow trial ===
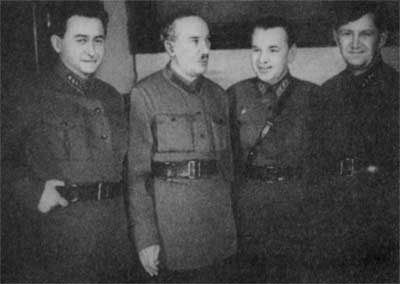
NKVD chiefs responsible for mass repressions; (left to right): Yakov Agranov, Genrikh Yagoda, unidentified, and Stanislav Redens. Agranov, Yagoda and Redens were eventually arrested and executed.

The third and final trial, in March 1938, known as the Trial of the Twenty-One, is the best-known of the Soviet show trials because of the people involved and the scope of the charges (which tied up the loose ends from earlier trials). It included 21 defendants alleged to belong to the "Bloc of Rightists and Trotskyites" reportedly led by Nikolai Bukharin, former chairman of the Communist International; former premier Alexei Rykov; Christian Rakovsky; Nikolai Krestinsky and Genrikh Yagoda, the recently-disgraced head of the NKVD.

Although an opposition bloc led by Trotsky with Zinovievites existed, Pierre Broué says that Bukharin was not involved. Jules Humbert-Droz, a former Broué ally, said in his memoirs that Bukharin told him he formed a secret bloc with Zinoviev and Kamenev to remove Stalin from leadership.

The fact that Yagoda was one of the accused indicated the speed at which the purges were consuming their own. No other crime of the Stalin era captivated Western intellectuals as much as the trial and execution of Bukharin, who was a Marxist theorist of international standing. For prominent communists such as Bertram Wolfe, Jay Lovestone, Arthur Koestler, and Heinrich Brandler, the Bukharin trial was their final break with communism; the first three became fervent anti-communists. Bukharin's confession symbolized communism's depredations, which destroyed its sons and also enlisted them in self-destruction and denial.

==== Bukharin's confession ====
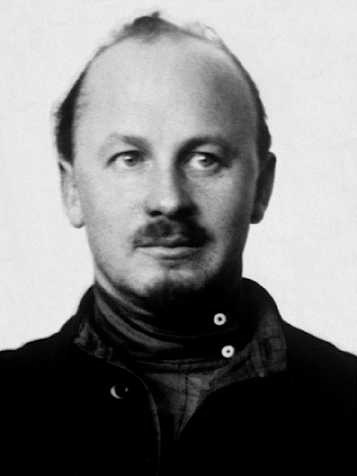
Nikolai Bukharin, Russian Bolshevik revolutionary executed in 1938

On the first day of the trial, Krestinsky caused a sensation when he repudiated his written confession and pleaded not guilty to all charges. He changed his plea the next day, however, after "special measures" which dislocated his left shoulder and caused other injuries.

Anastas Mikoyan and Vyacheslav Molotov later said that Bukharin was never tortured, but his interrogators were told "beating permitted" and were pressured to extract a confession from the "star" defendant. Bukharin held out for three months, but threats to his young wife and infant son and "methods of physical influence" wore him down. When he read his confession (amended and corrected by Stalin), he withdrew it. The examination began again, with a double team of interrogators.

Bukharin's confession was a subject of debate among Western observers, inspiring Arthur Koestler's novel Darkness at Noon and a philosophical essay by Maurice Merleau-Ponty in Humanism and Terror. It was a combination of fulsome confessions (of being a "degenerate fascist" working for the "restoration of capitalism") and subtle criticisms of the trial. An observer noted that after disproving several charges against him, Bukharin "proceeded to demolish or rather showed he could very easily demolish the whole case." The observer said that "the confession of the accused is not essential. The confession of the accused is a medieval principle of jurisprudence" in a trial that was based solely on confessions. He finished his last plea by saying:

[T]he monstrousness of my crime is immeasurable especially in the new stage of struggle of the U.S.S.R. May this trial be the last severe lesson, and may the great might of the U.S.S.R. become clear to all.

Romain Rolland and others wrote to Stalin seeking clemency for Bukharin, but all the leading defendants were executed (except Rakovsky and two others, who were killed in NKVD prisoner massacres in 1941).

== "Ex-kulaks" and other "anti-Soviet elements" ==
On 2 July 1937, in a top-secret order to regional party and NKVD chiefs, Stalin instructed them to estimate the number of "kulaks" and "criminals" in their districts. These individuals were to be arrested and executed, or sent to Gulag camps. The party chiefs produced the lists within days, with figures roughly corresponding to the number of individuals already under secret-police surveillance.

NKVD Order No. 00447 was issued on 30 July 1937, directed against "ex-kulaks" and other "anti-Soviet elements" such as former officials of the Tsarist regime and former members of political parties other than the Communist Party. They were to be executed or sent to Gulag prison camps extrajudicially, following decisions by NKVD troikas. The following categories appear to have been on index cards, catalogues of suspects assembled over the years by the NKVD and systematically tracked down: "ex-kulaks" previously deported to "special settlements" in inhospitable parts of the country (Siberia, the Urals, Kazakhstan, and the Far North), former tsarist civil servants, former officers of the White Army, participants in peasant rebellions, members of the clergy, people deprived of voting rights, former members of non-Bolshevik parties, criminals (such as thieves) known to the police, and other "socially harmful elements".

Many people were arrested at random in sweeps, on the basis of denunciations or because they were related to, were friends with or knew people already arrested. Engineers, peasants, railway and other types of workers were arrested during the "Kulak Operation" based on the fact that they worked for (or near) strategic sites and factories where work accidents had occurred due to "frantic rhythms and plans". During this period, the NKVD reopened these cases and relabeled them as "sabotage" or "wrecking."

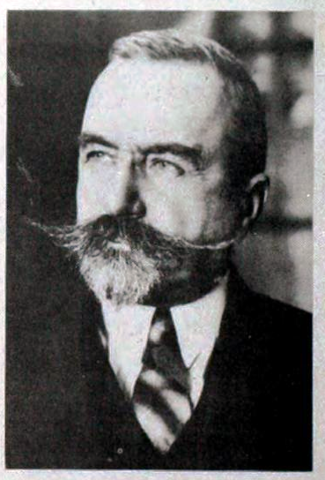
Yevgeny-Ludvig Karlovich Miller, one of the remaining leaders of the White movement, was abducted from Paris by the NKVD in 1937 and executed in Moscow 19 months later.

The Orthodox clergy, including active parishioners, was nearly annihilated; eighty-five percent of the 35,000 clergy members were arrested. Also particularly vulnerable to repression were the "special settlers" (spetzpereselentsy), who were under permanent police surveillance and were a large pool of potential "enemies". At least 100,000 of them were arrested during the Great Purge.

Common criminals, such as thieves and "violators of the passport regime", were also dealt with summarily. In Moscow, nearly one third of the 20,765 people executed on the Butovo firing range were charged with a non-political criminal offence.

To carry out the mass arrests, the 25,000 officers of the NKVD were supplemented with police units and Komsomol (Young Communist League) and civilian Communist Party members. To meet quotas, the police rounded up people in markets and train stations to arrest "social outcasts". Local NKVD units, to meet "casework minimums" and force confessions from arrestees, worked long shifts during which they interrogated, tortured and beat prisoners. In many cases, those arrested were forced to sign blank pages which were later filled in with a fabricated confession by interrogators.

After the interrogations, the files were submitted to NKVD troikas which pronounced verdicts without those accused. A troika went through several hundred cases during a half-day-long session, delivering a death sentence or a sentence to the Gulag labor camps. Death sentences were immediately enforceable. Executions were carried out at night in prisons or in secluded areas run by the NKVD on the outskirts of major cities. The "Kulak Operation" was the largest single campaign of repression in 1937–38, with 669,929 people arrested and 376,202 executed (over half the total of known executions).

== Campaigns targeting nationalities ==
On Yezhov's order, a series of mass operations of the NKVD was carried out from 1937 through 1938 targeting nationalities in the Soviet Union. The Polish Operation of the NKVD was the largest of this kind, with the largest number of victims: 143,810 arrests and 111,091 executions. Timothy Snyder estimates that at least eighty-five thousand were ethnic Poles. The remainder were "suspected" of being Polish.

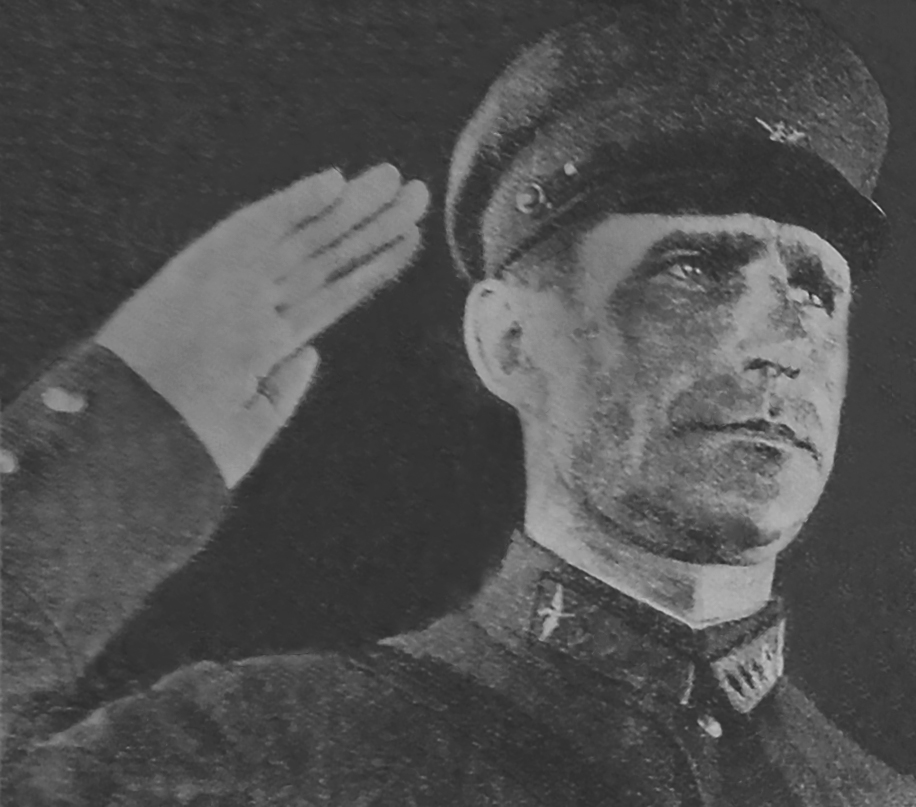
Yakov Alksnis, head of the Red Army Air Forces, fell victim to the Latvian Operation in 1938.

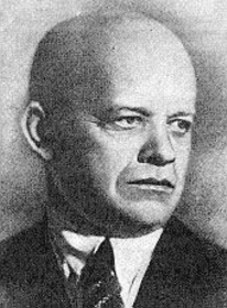
Polish-born Soviet politician Stanislav Kosior, a contributor to the Holodomor, was executed in 1939.

Poles were 12.5 percent of those killed during the Great Purge although they were 0.4 percent of the population. Overall, national minorities targeted in the campaigns were 36 percent of the victims of the Great Purge, but were 1.6 percent of the Soviet population. Seventy-four percent of ethnic minorities arrested during the Great Purge were executed; those sentenced during the Kulak Operation had a 50-percent chance of being executed, although this may have been due to lack of space in the Gulag camps late in the purge.

The wives and children of those arrested and executed were dealt with by NKVD Order No. 00486. Women were sentenced to forced labour for five or 10 years, and their minor children were placed in orphanages. All possessions were confiscated. Extended families had nothing to live on, which usually sealed their fate as well; this affected 200,000 to 250,000 people of Polish background, depending on family size. National operations of the NKVD were conducted with a quota system using the album procedure.

The Polish Operation of the NKVD was a model for a series of similar NKVD secret decrees targeting a number of the Soviet Union's diaspora nationalities: Finns, Latvians, Estonians, Bulgarians, Afghans, Iranians, Greeks, and Chinese. The operations against national minorities were second only to the Kulak Operation in their number of victims. According to Timothy Snyder, ethnic Poles were the largest group of victims of the Great Purge; less than 0.5 percent of the country's population, they were 12.5 percent of those executed.

Snyder attributes 300,000 deaths during the Great Purge to "national terror", including ethnic minorities and Ukrainian kulaks who had survived dekulakization and the Holodomor famine which killed millions during the early 1930s. Lev Kopelev wrote "In Ukraine, 1937 began in 1933", referring to earlier Soviet political repression. Ukrainian cultural elites were known as the Executed Renaissance, and statistics from Ukraine's Ministry of Foreign Affairs indicate that about 200,000 victims of the Great Purge were Ukrainians.

Most of the diaspora minorities were Soviet citizens and whose ancestors had lived for decades (sometimes centuries) in the Soviet Union and Russian Empire, but "this designation absolutized their cross-border ethnicities as the only salient aspect of their identity, sufficient proof of their disloyalty and sufficient justification for their arrest and execution". Historian Gerald Meyer argues that national minorities were targeted during the purges due to their perceived inability to assimilate into the evolving Soviet society and because they maintained traditional lifestyles. The national operations of the NKVD have been called genocidal; Norman Naimark called Stalin's policy towards Poles in the 1930s "genocidal", but he did not consider the Great Purge entirely genocidal because it also targeted political opponents.

Security issues in border areas have been cited as a need to secure the ethnic integrity of Soviet space vis-à-vis neighboring capitalist states. Adherents of this theory believe that representatives of minorities were killed not because of their ethnicity, but because of their possible relationship to countries hostile to the USSR and fear of disloyalty in case of an invasion. Little proof exists, however, to suggest that Russia's and Stalin's reported prejudices played a central role in the Great Purge.

== Purge of the army and navy ==
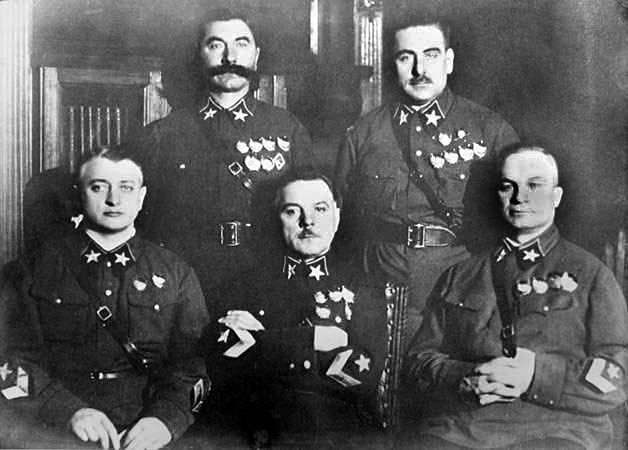
The first five Marshals of the Soviet Union in November 1935; (l–r) Mikhail Tukhachevsky, Semyon Budyonny, Kliment Voroshilov, Vasily Blyukher, and Alexander Yegorov. Only Budyonny and Voroshilov survived the Great Purge.

The purge of the Red Army and Military Maritime Fleet removed three of five marshals (then equivalent to four-star generals), 13 of 15 army commanders (equivalent to three-star generals), eight of nine admirals (the purge fell heavily on the Navy, who were suspected of exploiting opportunities for foreign contacts), 50 of 57 army corps commanders, 154 out of 186 division commanders, all 16 army commissars, and 25 of 28 army corps commissars. It was first thought that 25 to 50 percent of Red Army officers had been purged, but the true figure is 3.7 to 7.7 percent. The discrepancy resulted from a systematic underestimation of the true size of the Red Army officer corps, and it was overlooked that most of those purged were merely expelled from the party; thirty percent of the officers purged from 1937 to 1939 were allowed to return to service.

The purge of the army was said to be supported by German-forged documents (alleged correspondence between Marshal Tukhachevsky and members of the German high command). The claim is unsupported by facts; by the time the documents were reportedly created, two of Tukhachevsky's group were already imprisoned, and by the time the document was said to have reached Stalin the purge was already underway. Evidence introduced at trial was obtained from forced confessions.

The purge had a significant effect on German decision-making in World War II. Many German generals opposed an invasion of Russia but Hitler disagreed, calling the Red Army less effective after its intellectual leadership was eliminated in the purge.

== Wider purge ==
External videos
- Soviet woman's speech during the Great Purge
- Nikita Khrushchev's speech during the purge

Russian Trotskyist historian Vadim Rogovin said that Stalin had destroyed thousands of foreign communists capable of leading socialist change in their respective countries, citing 600 active Bulgarian communists who died in his prison camps and the thousands of German communists handed over from Stalin to the Gestapo after the signing of the Nazi-Soviet Pact. Rogovin also noted that sixteen members of the central committee of the Communist Party of Germany were victims of Stalinist terror. Repressive measures were also imposed on the Hungarian, Yugoslav and other Polish Communist parties.

According to historian Eric D. Weitz, 60 percent of German exiles in the Soviet Union were liquidated during the Stalinist terror and a greater proportion of the KPD Politburo membership died in the Soviet Union than in Nazi Germany. Weitz noted that hundreds of German citizens, most of whom were communists, were handed over to the Gestapo from Stalin's administration. Many Jews, including Alexander Weissberg-Cybulski and Fritz Houtermans, were arrested in 1937 by the NKVD and turned over to the Gestapo. Joseph Berger-Barzilai, co-founder of the Communist Party of Palestine, spent twenty years in Stalin's prisons and concentration camps after the purges in 1937.

In Spain, the NKVD oversaw purges of anti-Stalinist elements of the Republican forces (including Trotskyist and anarchist factions). Notable were the execution of Andreu Nin, Spanish POUM and former government minister, Jose Robles, a left-wing academic and translator, and many members of the POUM.

Of six members of the original Politburo during the October Revolution who lived until the Great Purge, Stalin was the only one who survived in the Soviet Union. Four of the other five were executed; the fifth, Trotsky, was forced into exile in 1929 and was assassinated in Mexico by Soviet agent Ramón Mercader in 1940.

The victims were convicted in absentia and in camera by extrajudicial bodies. NKVD troikas sentenced indigenous "enemies" under NKVD Order No. 00447, and a two-man dvoiki (NKVD Commissar Yezhov and main state prosecutor Andrey Vyshinsky or their deputies) sentenced those arrested for national reasons.

Victims were executed at night in prisons, in the cellars of NKVD headquarters or in a secluded area, usually a forest. NKVD officers shot prisoners in the head with pistols. Other methods of killing were used on an experimental basis; in Moscow, the use of gas vans to kill victims during transportation to the Butovo firing range has been documented.

=== Astronomers ===
About 10-20% of Soviet astronomers fell victim to the Great Purge, with a number of these being executed. Others were imprisoned, some of which disappeared in the Soviet prison system with their ultimate fate being unknown. Most surviving astronomers persecuted during the purges did not return to astronomy. The purges of astronomers were spearheaded by Vartan Ter-Oganezov, an anti-relativity Soviet pseudoscientist who attacked the theory of general relativity and the theory of cosmic expansion on the grounds that they were inconsistent with dialectical materialism. Ter-Oganezov was widely known for being combative and cantankerous towards those he ideologically disagreed with and liberally using invective, and he accused astronomers of various political and philosophical crimes at sessions of the Astronomy Council of the Academy of Sciences. He also was since 1930 the editor in chief for the amateur astronomy journal Mirovedenie, which he used to disseminate denunciations of astronomers whose cosmological theories conflicted with dialectical materialism.

On the night of 6-7 November 1936, numerous researchers at Pulkovo Observatory in Leningrad were detained in a mass arrest, followed by further arrests in December 1936 and throughout 1937. The pretext for these arrests was a fabricated confession from the Pulkovo astronomer Boris Numerov of collaboration with Germany and espionage, who had been arrested and interrogated in October of that year after a disgruntled graduate student had denounced Numerov to the NKVD. Numerous committees investigated Pulkovo, on which Ter-Oganezov served and consistently was the sole member recommending the committees to officially publish negative findings about Pulkovo. Ter-Oganezov denounced the director of Pulkovo, Boris Gerasimovich, for alleged sabotage at multiple sessions of the Astronomy Council of the Academy of Sciences in 1937, along with Numerov and other Pulkovo astronomers who had been arrested earlier. Ter-Oganezov also published further vitriolic denunciations of Gerasimovich and others in Mirovedenie. Gerasimovich was executed following a show trial on 30 November 1937. Numerov died in prison in 1941.

Ter-Oganezov saw less success in his attacks on Shternberg State Astronomical Institute (GAISh) in Moscow. Despite personally denouncing the director of GAISh, Vasiliy Grigorievich Fesenkov, as a “wrecker”, Fesenkov was never arrested. Although GAISh had a “red graduate student body” composed of ideological communists, most staff at GAISh refused to partake in their denunciations, and accusations by these graduate students against GAISh researchers like Fesenkov and S. N. Blazhko when they failed graduate examinations were generally promptly dismissed.

Ter-Oganezov’s standing waned in the years after 1937, having made many enemies in the professional and amateur astronomical community. Ter-Oganezov’s reputation had also become tainted because of his past association with Mikhail Pokrovsky, who had died in 1932 and had been posthumously denounced as an anti-Marxist during the Purge. Though he regained some influence after World War II during the Zhdanovshchina, he never again achieved the same institutional and ideological power he wielded during the Purge.

=== Biologists ===
The Purge also engineered a hostile intellectual climate in the biological sciences, with about 5% of biologists in the USSR being purged. The 1930s saw a rise in the influence of Trofim Lysenko in Soviet science, making topics such as human biological variation and natural selection in human populations politically incorrect and dangerous topics. Researchers such as Georgy Gause self-censored and moved away from ecological and evolutionary theory towards less controversial practical subjects like antibiotics development.

=== Western émigré victims ===
Victims of the purge included American immigrants to the Soviet Union who had emigrated from the U.S. at the height of the Great Depression to find work. At the height of the purge, American immigrants begged the U.S. embassy for passports to leave the Soviet Union. Turned away by embassy officials, they were arrested outside by the NKVD. Several were shot dead at the Butovo firing range. One hundred forty-one American Communists of Finnish origin were executed and buried at Sandarmokh, and 127 Finnish Canadians were shot and buried there.

=== Execution of Gulag inmates ===
Political prisoners sentenced to the Gulag camps were also executed in large numbers although the majority of Gulag inmates overall were non-political prisoners. According to Getty, Rittersporn, and Zemskov, the population of the Gulags increased by 175,487 in 1937 and 320,828 in 1938. NKVD Order No. 00447 targeted "the most vicious and stubborn anti-Soviet elements in camps", all "to be put into the first category" (shot). The order specified 10,000 executions, but at least three times that number were shot (most in March and April 1938).

=== Mongolian purge ===
During the late 1930s, Stalin dispatched NKVD operatives to the Mongolian People's Republic, established a Mongolian version of the NKVD troika, and executed tens of thousands of people accused of ties to "pro-Japanese spy rings". Buddhist lamas made up most of the victims, with 18,000 killed. Other victims were nobility and political and academic figures; some were ordinary workers and herders. Mass graves containing hundreds of executed Buddhist monks and civilians have been discovered as recently as 2003.

=== Xinjiang purge ===
Pro-Soviet leader Sheng Shicai, from Xinjiang province in China, launched his own purge in 1937 to coincide with Stalin's Great Purge. The Xinjiang War broke out during the purge. Sheng received assistance from the NKVD, and he and the Soviets alleged a massive Trotskyist conspiracy and a "Fascist Trotskyite plot" to destroy the Soviet Union. Soviet Consul General Garegin Apresoff, General Ma Hushan, Ma Shaowu, Mahmud Sijan, Xinjiang provincial leader Huang Han-chang and Hoja-Niyaz were among the 435 alleged conspirators in the plot, and Xinjiang came under virtual Soviet control.

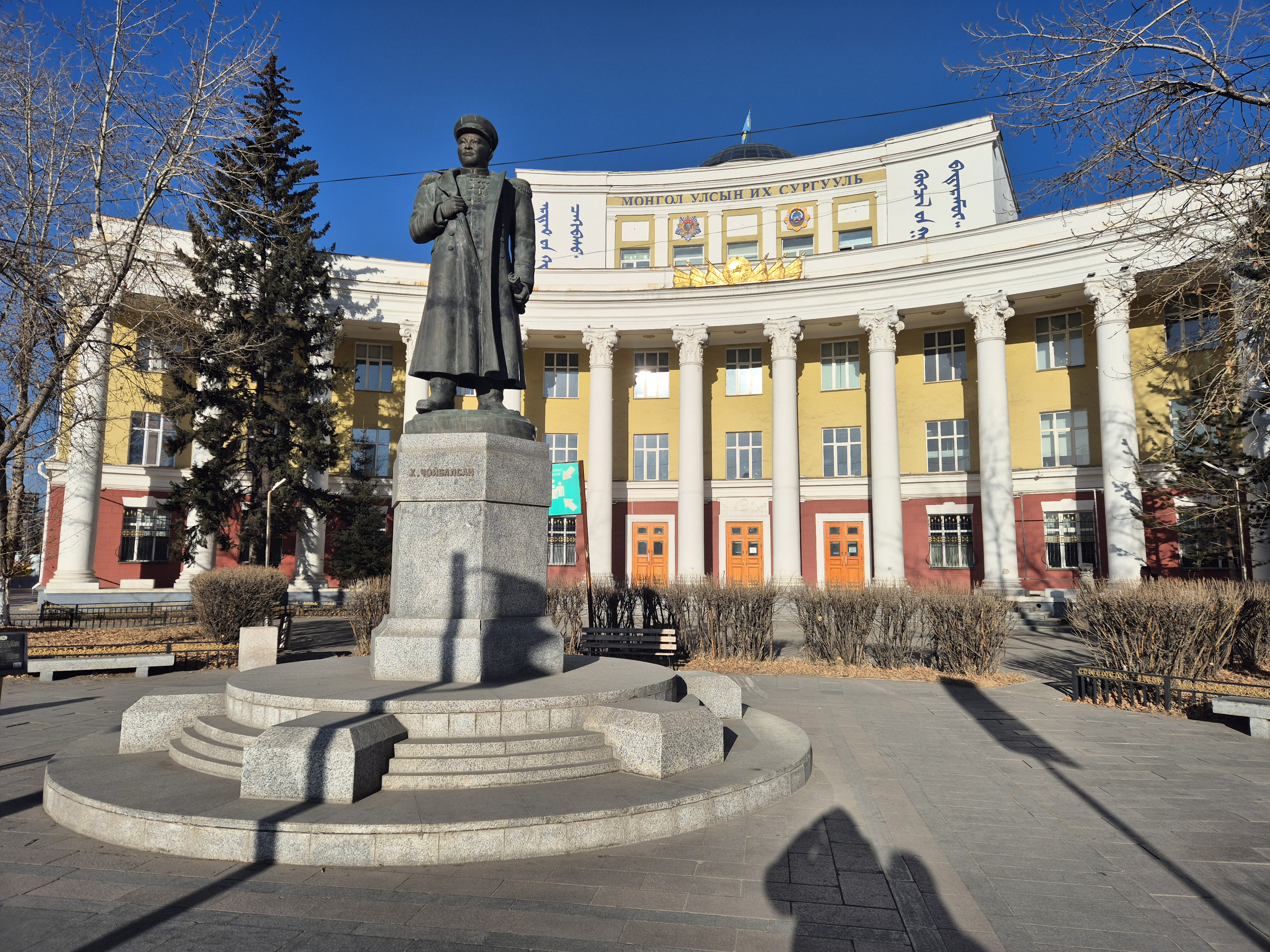
Statue of Khorloogiin Choibalsan in front of the National University of Mongolia

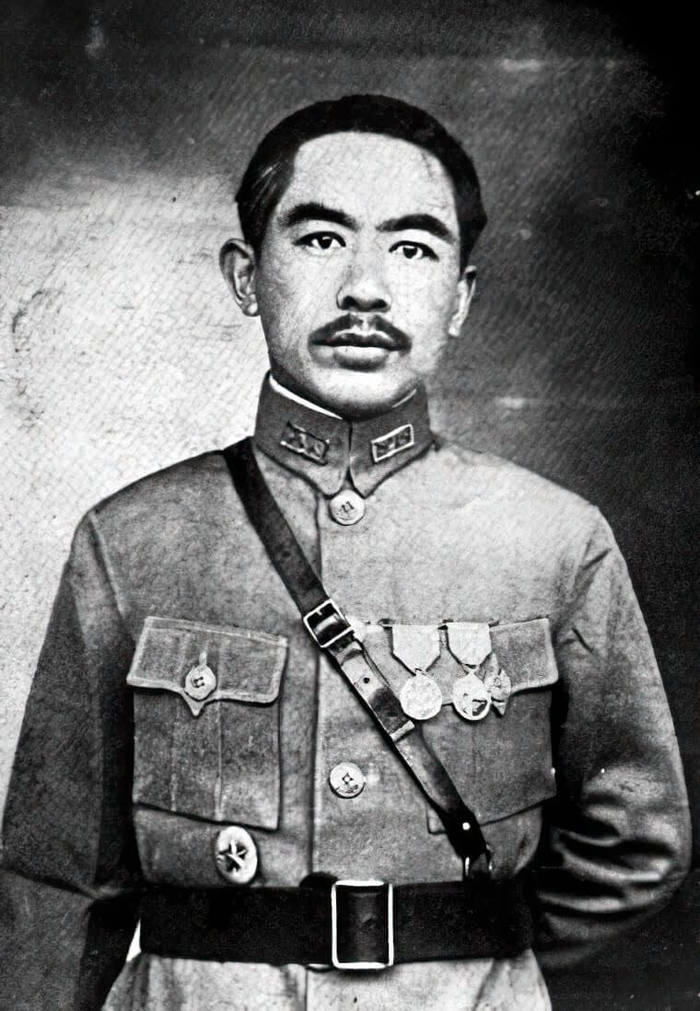
Sheng Shicai. Choibalsan and Sheng organized large-scale purges in Mongolia and Xinjiang.

== Timeline ==
The Great Purge of 1936–1938 can be divided into four periods:

- October 1936 – February 1937: Reforming the security organizations, adopting official plans to purge the elite
- March – June 1937: Purging the elites; adopting plans for mass repressions against the "social base" of the potential aggressors, starting with purging the "elites" from the opposition
- July 1937 – October 1938: Mass repressions against "kulaks", "dangerous" ethnic minorities, family members of opponents, military officers, and saboteurs in agriculture and industry
- November 1938 – 1939: Halting mass operations, abolishing many organs of extrajudicial executions, reining in some organizers of mass repressions

== End ==
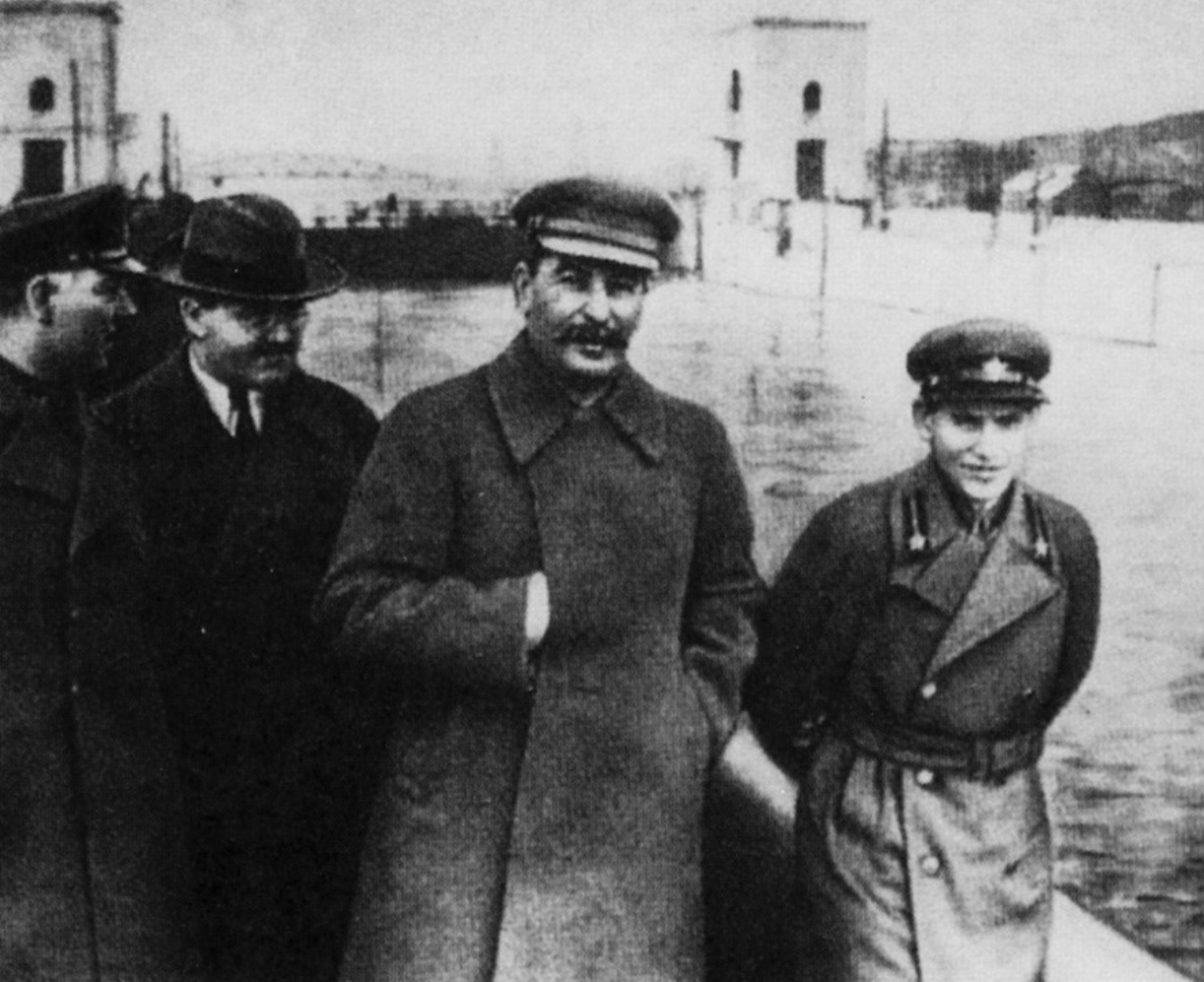

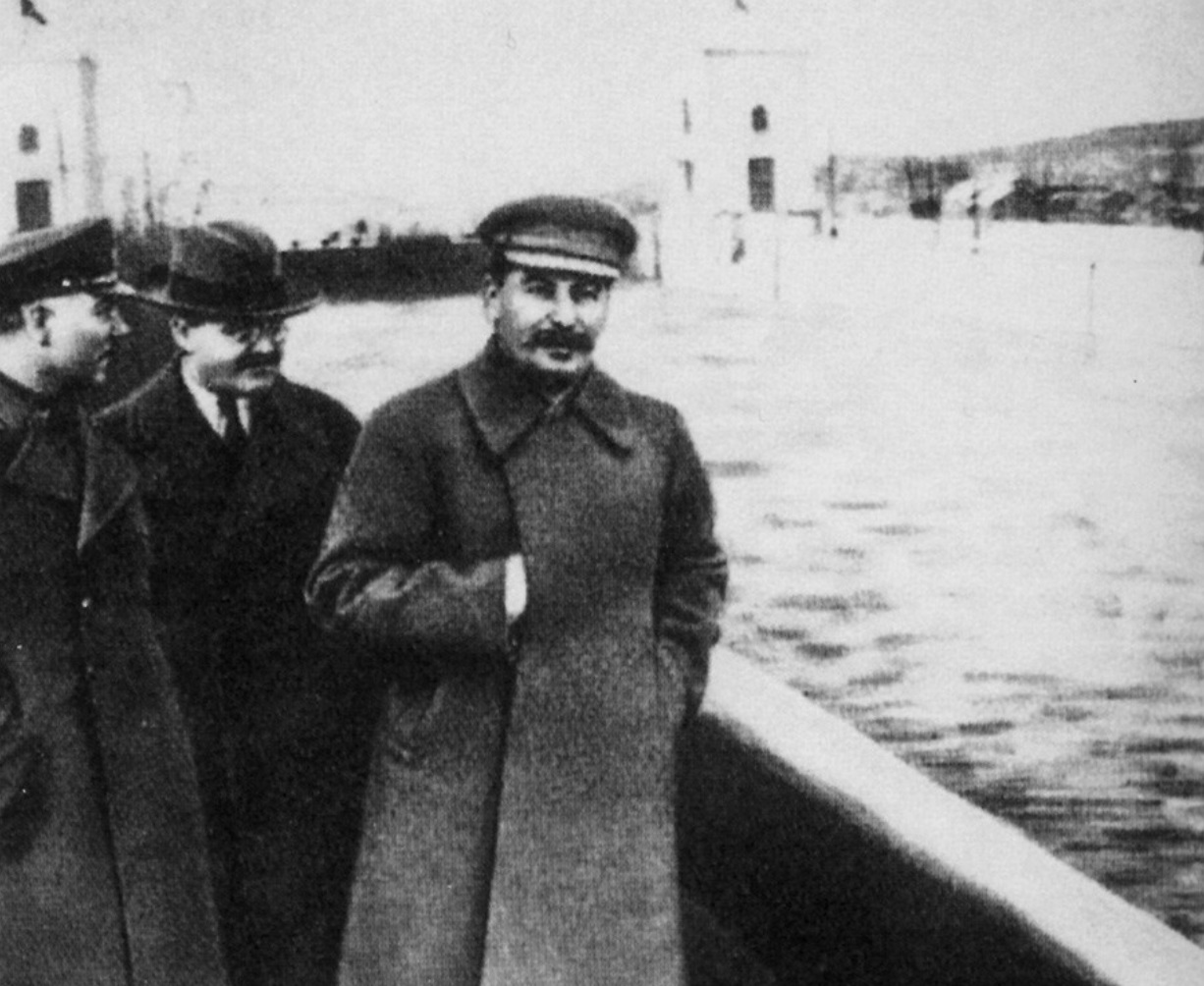
Damnatio memoriae of Nikolai Yezhov. He was posthumously removed from pictures as part of the censorship of images in the Soviet Union, such as where he stood next to Joseph Stalin.

In the summer of 1938, Yezhov was relieved from his post as head of the NKVD and was eventually tried and executed. Lavrentiy Beria succeeded him as head. On 17 November 1938, a joint decree by the Council of People's Commissars and the Communist Party central committee (the Decree about Arrests, Prosecutor Supervision and Course of Investigation) and a subsequent NKVD order signed by Beria cancelled most of the NKVD orders of systematic repression and suspended the implementation of death sentences.

Michael Parrish wrote that although the Great Purge ended in 1938, a lesser purge continued during the 1940s. Aleksandr Solzhenitsyn (a Soviet Army officer who became a prisoner for a decade in the Gulag system) wrote in The Gulag Archipelago a timeline of all Leninist and Stalinist purges (1918–1956); the 1936–1938 purge may have attracted the most attention from the intelligentsia, but several others (such as the first five-year plan of 1928–1933 collectivization and dekulakization) were equally large and devoid of justice.

High military commanders arrested under Yezhov were later executed under Beria. Examples include Marshal of the Soviet Union Alexander Yegorov, arrested in April 1938 and shot (or died after torture) in February 1939 (his wife, G. A. Yegorova, was shot in August 1938); Army Commander Ivan Fedko, arrested in July 1938 and shot in February 1939; Flagman Konstantin Dushenov, arrested in May 1938 and shot in February 1940; Komkor G. I. Bondar, arrested in August 1938 and shot in March 1939. All were posthumously rehabilitated.

When the relatives of those who had been executed in 1937–1938 inquired about their fate, they were told by the NKVD that their arrested relatives had been sentenced to "10 years without the right of correspondence" (десять лет без права переписки). When the ten-year periods elapsed in 1947–1948 and those arrested did not appear, relatives asked the MGB about their fate again and were told that they died in prison.

After Stalin's death, the truth about the purges began to emerge within the party. On 25 February 1956, Nikita Khrushchev delivered a speech ("On the Cult of Personality and Its Consequences", also known as the "secret speech") to a closed session of the 20th Party Congress. In his speech, Khrushchev said that Stalin "acted not through persuasion, explanation, and patient cooperation with people, but by imposing his concepts and demanding absolute submission to his opinion. Whoever opposed this concept or tried to prove his viewpoint, and the correctness of his position, was doomed to removal from the leading collective and to subsequent moral and physical annihilation." Of the 139 members and candidates of the Central Committee elected at the 17th Congress, "98 persons, i.e., 70 percent, were arrested and shot (mostly in 1937-1938)," which he attributed to "the abuse of power by Stalin, who began to use mass terror against the Party cadres." About the trials, Khrushchev said: "The confessions of guilt of many arrested and charged with enemy activity were gained with the help of cruel and inhuman tortures."

== Western reactions ==
Although the trials of former Soviet leaders were widely publicized, the hundreds of thousands of other arrests and executions were not. These became known in the West only as a few former Gulag inmates reached the West with their stories. Western correspondents failed to report the purges, and in many Western nations (especially France) attempts were made to silence or discredit witnesses. According to Robert Conquest, Jean-Paul Sartre said that the evidence of the camps should be ignored so the French proletariat would not be discouraged. A series of legal actions ensued, at which definitive evidence was presented that established the validity of the former labor-camp inmates' testimony.

Conquest wrote in his 1968 book, The Great Terror: Stalin's Purge of the Thirties, some Western observers were unintentionally (or intentionally) ignorant of the fraudulent nature of the charges and evidence; they included Walter Duranty of The New York Times, a Russian speaker; the American ambassador Joseph E. Davies, who noted "proof ... beyond reasonable doubt to justify the verdict of treason"; and Beatrice and Sidney Webb, authors of Soviet Communism: A New Civilization. "Communist parties everywhere simply transmitted the Soviet line" but some of the most critical reporting came from the left — notably a number of socialist and communist contributors to the British newspaper The Manchester Guardian. American journalist H. R. Knickerbocker reported the executions, calling them "the great purges" in 1941 and describing how over four years they affected "the top fourth or fifth, to estimate it conservatively, of the Party itself, of the Army, Navy, and Air Force leaders and then of the new Bolshevik intelligentsia, the foremost technicians, managers, supervisors, scientists". Knickerbocker wrote about dekulakization, "It is a conservative estimate to say that some 5,000,000 [kulaks] ... died at once, or within a few years."

Khrushchev's revelations in 1956 had a profound impact on Western communist parties. The Daily Worker (the Communist Party USA newspaper) published the Secret Speech in full, following the lead of The New York Times.

== Rehabilitation ==
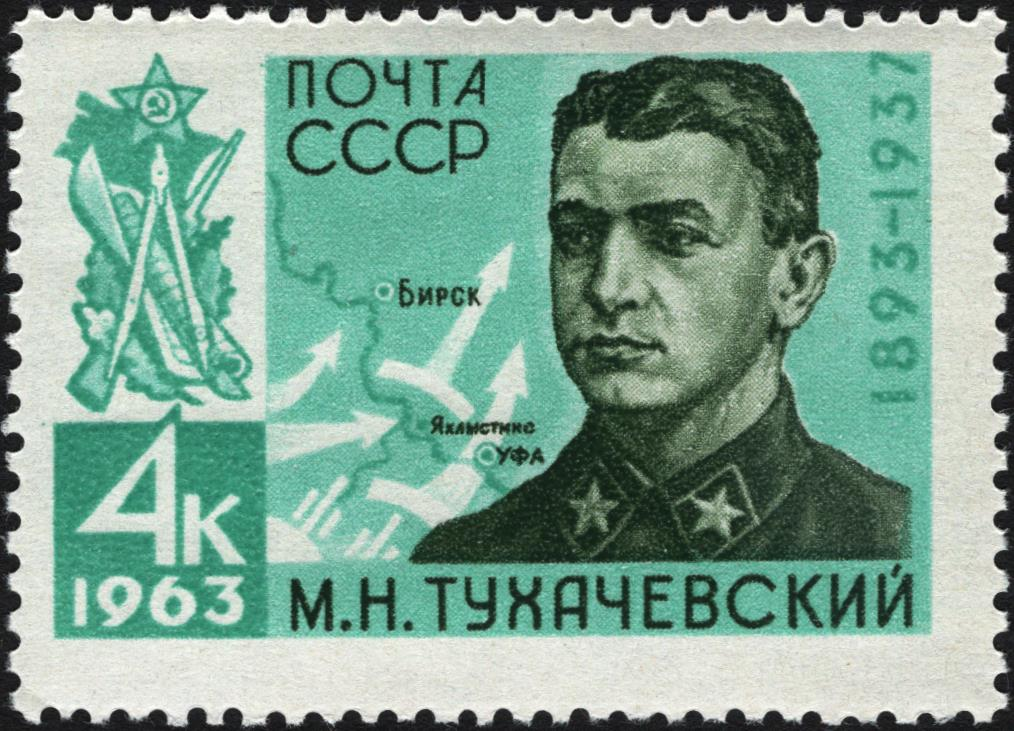
Posthumously rehabilitated, Mikhail Tukhachevsky was commemorated on a 1963 Soviet postage stamp.

The Great Purge was denounced by Nikita Khrushchev after Stalin's death. In his secret speech to the 20th CPSU congress in February 1956 (which was made public a month later), Khrushchev referred to the purges as an "abuse of power" by Stalin which resulted in enormous harm to the country. In the speech, he acknowledged that many of the victims were innocent and were convicted on the basis of confessions obtained by torture. Khrushchev later wrote in his memoirs that he had initiated the process, overcoming objections from the rest of the party leadership; the transcripts belie this although they indicate differences of opinion about the speech.

In 1954, some of the convictions began to be overturned. Mikhail Tukhachevsky and other generals convicted in the trial of Red Army generals were declared innocent (rehabilitated) in 1957. Former Politburo members Yan Rudzutak and Stanislav Kosior and many lower-level victims were also declared innocent during the 1950s. Nikolai Bukharin and others convicted in the Moscow Trials were not rehabilitated until as late as 1988. Leon Trotsky, considered a major player in the Russian Revolution and a major contributor to Marxist theory, was never rehabilitated by the USSR. Rehabilitation: The Political Processes of the 1930s–50s (Реабилитация. Политические процессы 30–50-х годов), published in 1991, contains a large amount of new archive material (transcripts of interrogations, letters of convicts, and photos) demonstrating in detail how a number of show trials were fabricated.

== Number of people executed ==
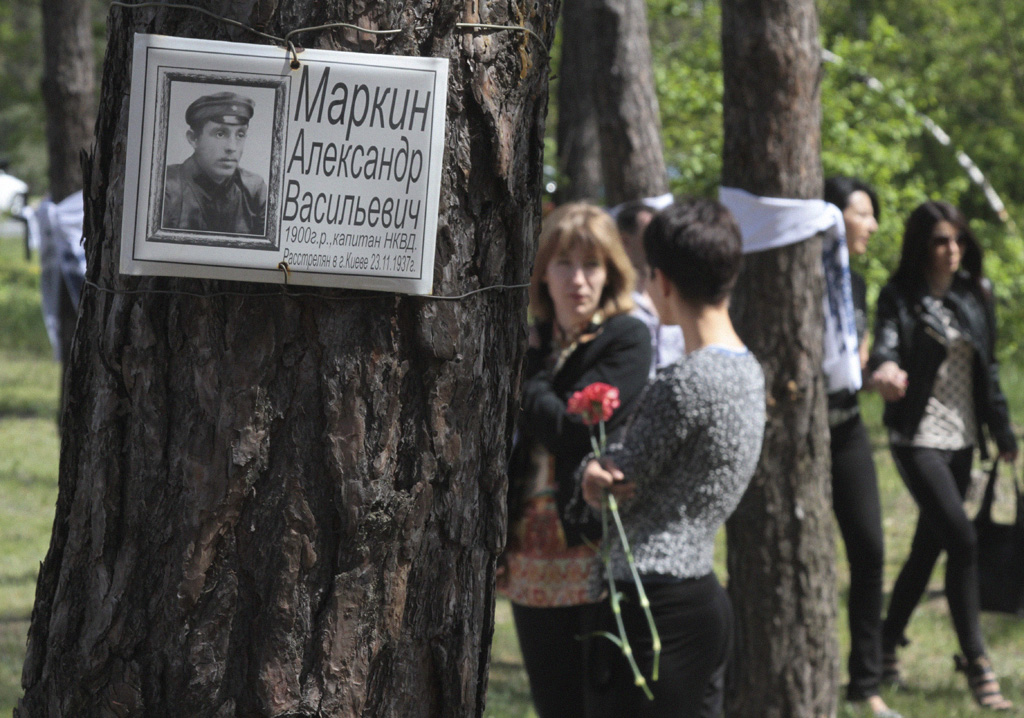
Memorial events at the Bykivnia graves, Kyiv, Ukraine

Official figures give the total number of verifiable executions in 1937 and 1938 at 681,692. in addition to 116,000 deaths in the Gulag, Two thousand were unofficially killed in non-Article-58 shootings. The total estimate of deaths during the Great Purge ranges from 950,000 to 1.2 million, including executions, deaths in detention and those who died shortly after being released from the Gulag. Between 16,500 to 50,000 deaths occurred around the same time in the process of deporting Soviet Koreans. According to Robert Conquest, a practice to lower execution numbers was to disguise executions with the sentence "10 years without the right of correspondence"; this almost always meant execution. All the bodies identified from mass graves at Vinnitsa and Kuropaty were of individuals who had received this sentence. Despite this, the lower figure roughly confirmed Conquest's 1968 estimate of 700,000 "legal" executions; in the preface to the 40th anniversary edition of The Great Terror, Conquest wrote that he had been "correct on the vital matter—the numbers put to death: about one million".

According to J. Arch Getty and Oleg V. Naumov, "popular estimates of executions in the great purges vary from 500,000 to 7 million." However, "the archival evidence from the secret police rejects the astronomically high estimates often given for the number of terror victims" and "the data available at this point make it clear that the number shot in the two worst purge years [1937–38] was more likely in the hundreds of thousands than in the millions." Historian Corrina Kuhr wrote that 700,000 people were executed during the Great Purge, out of the 2.5 million who were arrested. Nérard François-Xavier estimates the same number of people who were sentenced to death, but said that 1.3 million people were arrested. The Soviets made their own estimates; Vyacheslav Molotov said:

"The report written by that commission member ... says that 1,370,000 arrests were made in the 1930s. That's too many. I responded that the figures should be thoroughly reviewed".

== Stalin's role ==
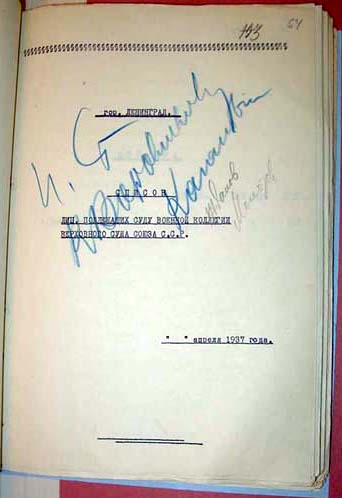
List from the Great Purge signed by Molotov, Stalin, Voroshilov, Kaganovich, and Zhdanov

Historians with archive access have confirmed that Stalin was intimately involved in the purge. Russian historian Oleg V. Khlevniuk says, "Theories about the elemental, spontaneous nature of the terror, about a loss of central control over the course of mass repression, and about the role of regional leaders in initiating the terror are simply not supported by the historical record". In addition to signing Yezhov's lists, Stalin issued instructions about certain individuals; he once told Yezhov, "Isn't it time to squeeze this gentleman and force him to report on his dirty little business? Where is he: in a prison or a hotel?" Reviewing one of Yezhov's lists, he added "beat, beat!" to M. I. Baranov's name. Stalin signed 357 lists in 1937 and 1938 authorizing the execution of about 40,000 people; around 90 percent of these are confirmed to have been shot, 7.4 percent of those executed legally. While reviewing one list, Stalin reportedly muttered to no one in particular: "Who's going to remember all this riff-raff in ten or twenty years time? No one. Who remembers the names now of the boyars Ivan the Terrible got rid of? No one." He ordered 100,000 Buddhist lamas in Mongolia to be liquidated, but political leader Peljidiin Genden resisted the order.

Yezhov may have misled Stalin about aspects of the purge. Contemporary and some subsequent commentators surmised that the Great Purge had not begun at Stalin's initiative, and the idea circulated that the process was out of control after it began. Stalin may have failed to anticipate NKVD excesses under Yezhov, and objected to the large numbers of people Yezhov was purging. He interrupted Yezhov when he announced that 200,000 party members were expelled, saying that they were "very many" and suggesting that the expulsion of 30,000 former Trotskyists and 600 Zinovievists "would be a bigger victory". Stephen G. Wheatcroft wrote that although the "purposive deaths" caused by Hitler constitute "murder", those under Stalin fall into the category of "execution"; however, in "causing death by criminal neglect and ruthlessness (...) Stalin probably exceeded Hitler":

Stalin undoubtedly caused many innocent people to be executed, but it seems likely that he [genuinely] thought many of them guilty of crimes against the state and felt that the execution of others would act as a deterrent to the guilty. He signed the papers and insisted on documentation. Hitler, by contrast, wanted to be rid of the Jews and communists simply because they were Jews and communists. He was not concerned about making any pretence at legality. He was careful not to sign anything on this matter and was equally insistent on no documentation.

== Soviet investigative commissions ==
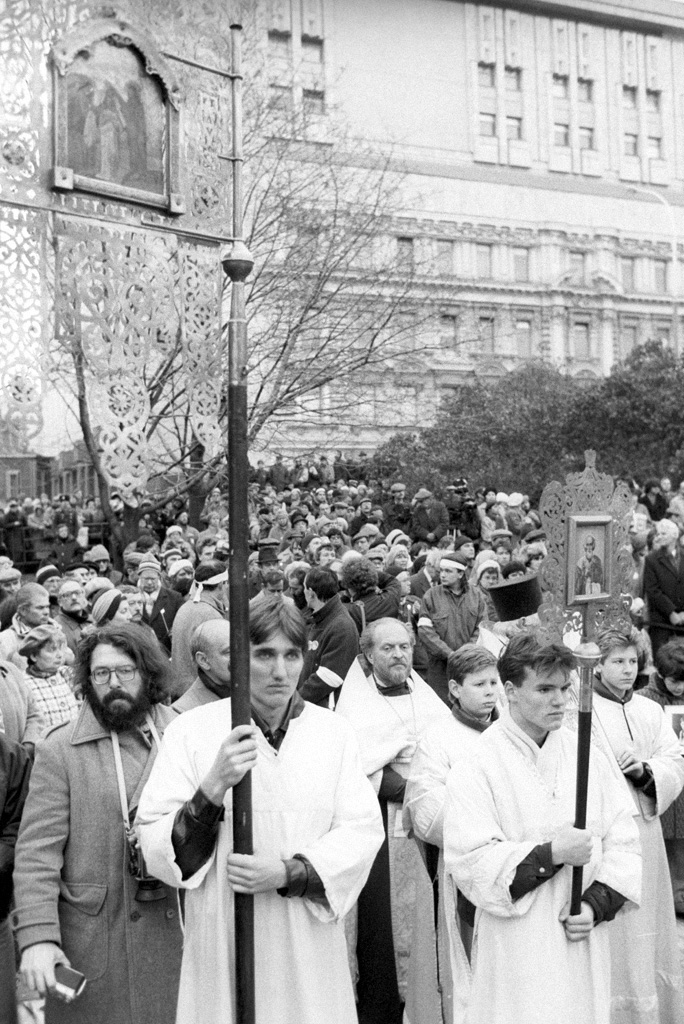
Memorial service for victims of political repression in Moscow, 1990

At least two Soviet commissions investigated Stalin's show trials after his death. The first, in 1956–1957 and headed by Molotov, included Voroshilov, Kaganovich, Mikhail Suslov, Yekaterina Furtseva, Nikolai Shvernik, Averky Aristov, Pyotr Pospelov and Roman Rudenko, and was tasked with investigating materials about Bukharin, Rykov, Zinoviev, Tukhachevsky and others. Saying that accusations against Tukhachevsky et al. should be dropped, it failed to fully rehabilitate the victims of the three Moscow trials; its final report, however, admits that the accusations were not proven during the trials and "evidence" was obtained by lies, blackmail, and "use of physical influence".

The second, Shvernik Commission worked primarily from 1961 to 1963 and included Alexander Shelepin, Serdyuk, Mironov, Rudenko, and Semichastny. It resulted in two large reports detailing falsifications in the show trials of Bukharin, Zinoviev, Tukhachevsky, and many others. The commission based its findings largely on documents and eyewitness testimony by former NKVD workers and victims of repression. It recommended rehabilitating everyone accused except for Radek and Yagoda; Radek's materials required further checking, and Yagoda was one of the falsifiers at the trials. According to the commission,

Stalin committed a very grave crime against the Communist party, the socialist state, Soviet people and worldwide revolutionary movement ... Together with Stalin, the responsibility for the abuse of law, mass unwarranted repressions and death of many thousands of wholly innocent people also lies on Molotov, Kaganovich, Malenkov ....

Molotov said, "We would have been complete idiots if we had taken the reports at their face value. We were not idiots." He added, "The cases were reviewed and some people were released."

== Mass graves and memorials ==
During the late 1980s, with the formation of Memorial and similar organisations across the Soviet Union at a time of Gorbachev's glasnost ("openness and transparency") it became possible to speak about the Great Purge and to begin locating the 1937–1938 killing grounds and identifying those buried there. In 1988, the mass graves at Kurapaty in Belarus were the site of a clash between demonstrators and police. A stone was brought in 1990 from the former White Sea Solovki prison camp and installed next to KGB headquarters in Moscow as a memorial to all victims of political repression since 1917.

After the collapse of the Soviet Union, many more mass graves of purge victims were discovered and turned into memorial sites. Some, such as the Bykivnia graves near Kyiv, reportedly contain up to 200,000 bodies. In 2007, the Butovo firing range near Moscow was turned into a shrine to victims of Stalinism. Between August 1937 and October 1938, more than 20,000 people were shot and buried there.

The Joffe Foundation in Saint Petersburg launched a Map of Memory website in 2016, which recorded the location and current use of 411 burial grounds and commemorative sites across Russia linked to forced resettlement, deportation, the Gulag, and 149 secret execution and burial sites. President Vladimir Putin opened the Wall of Grief, an official (but controversial) recognition of Soviet crimes, on 30 October 2017.

A mass grave containing 5,000 to 8,000 skeletons was discovered in Odesa, Ukraine, during an August 2021 exploration for a planned expansion of Odesa International Airport. The graves are believed to date back to the late 1930s, during the purge.

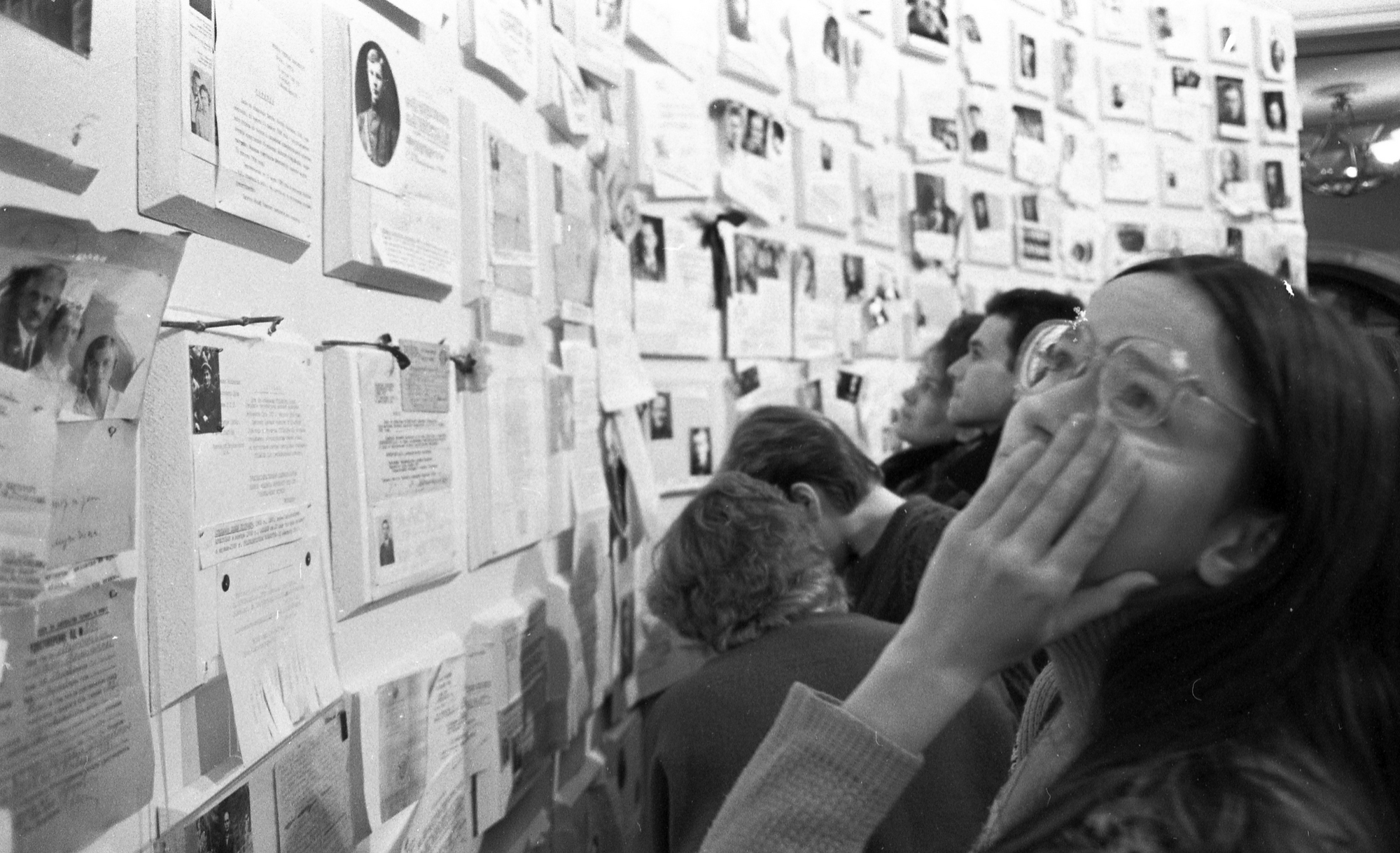
"Week of Conscience", the first exhibition of victims of Stalinism in Moscow, 19 November 1988

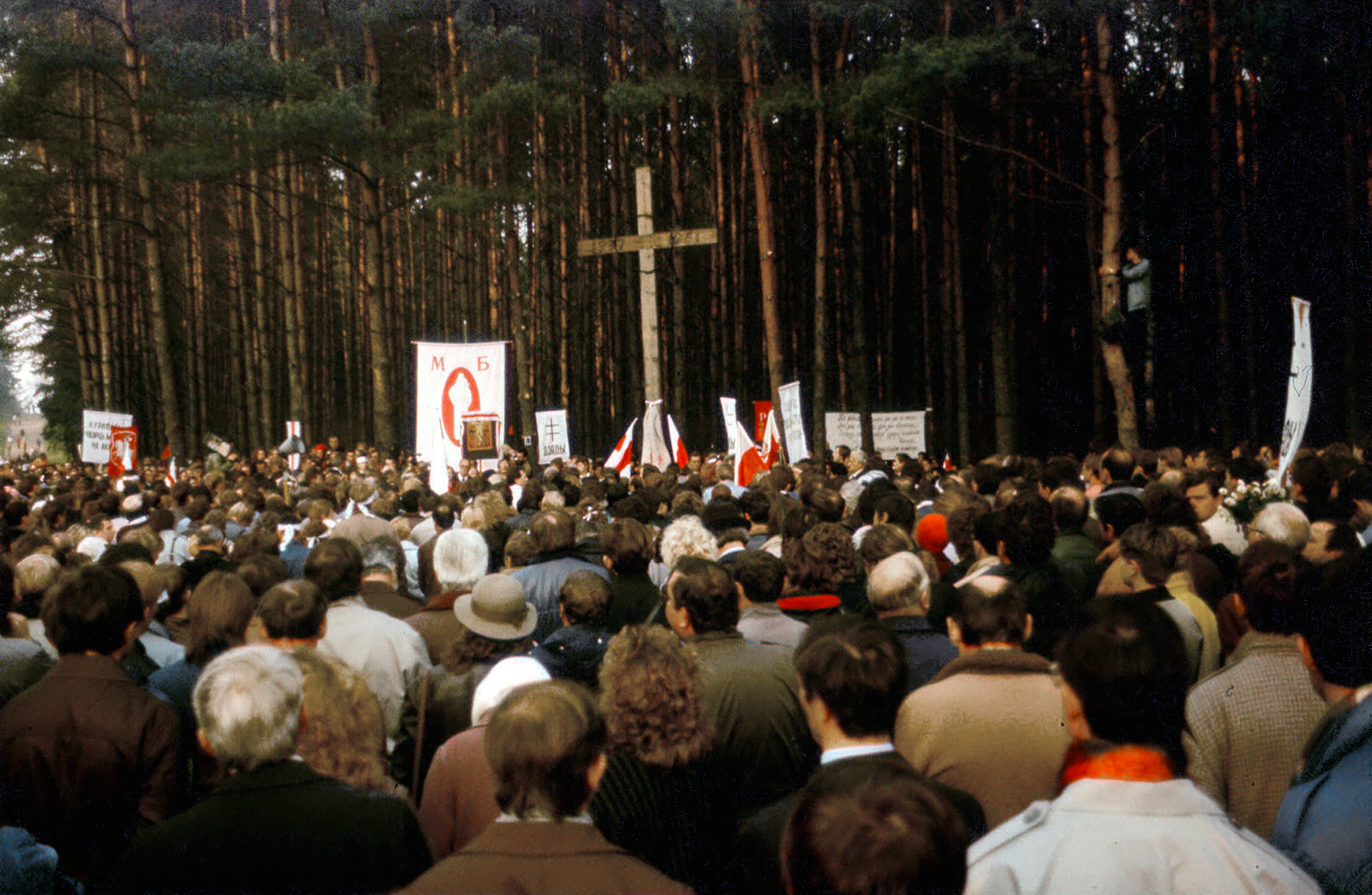
Kuropaty mass gravesite near Minsk, Belarus

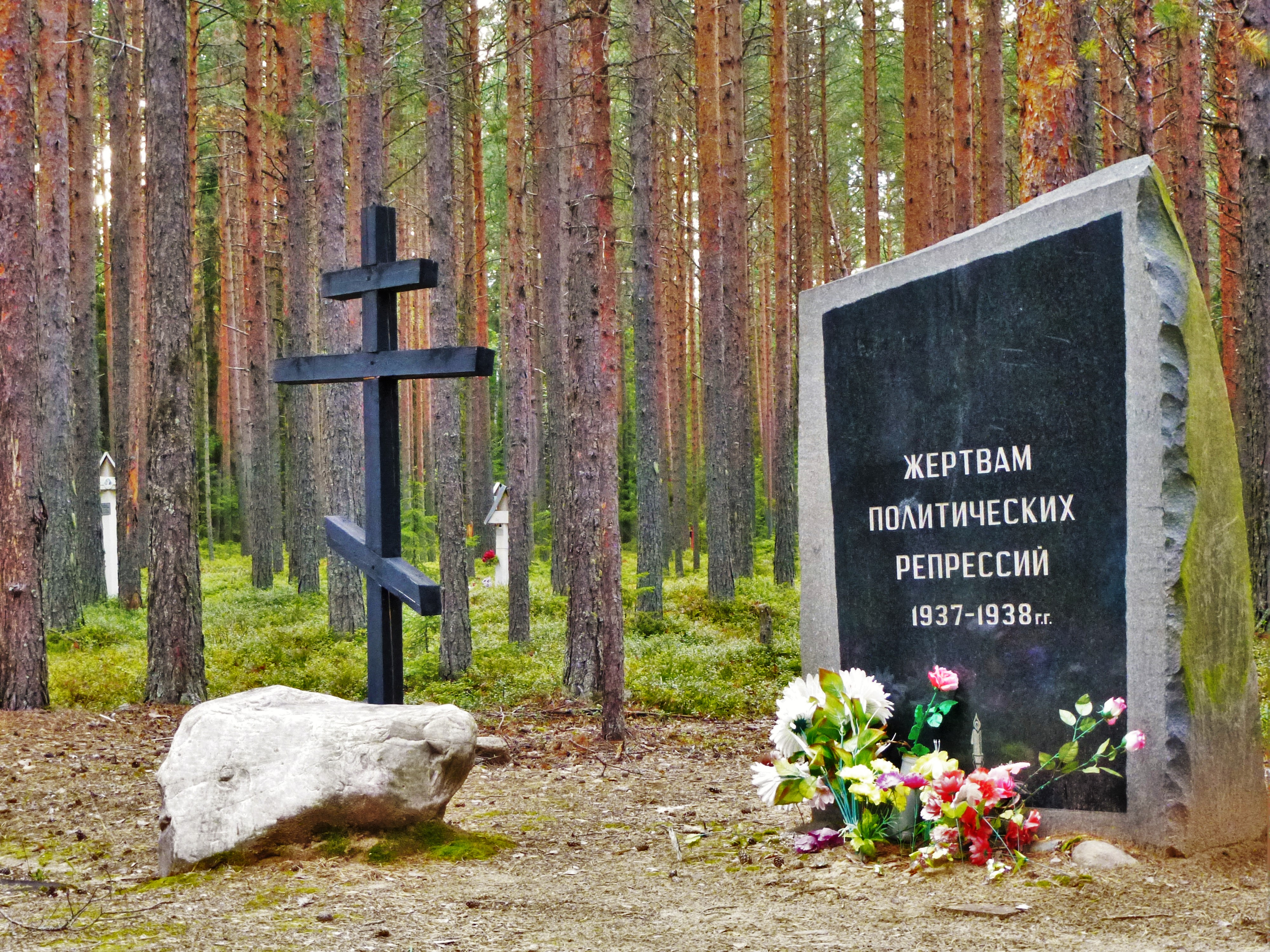
Krasny Bor memorial cemetery, near Petrozavodsk

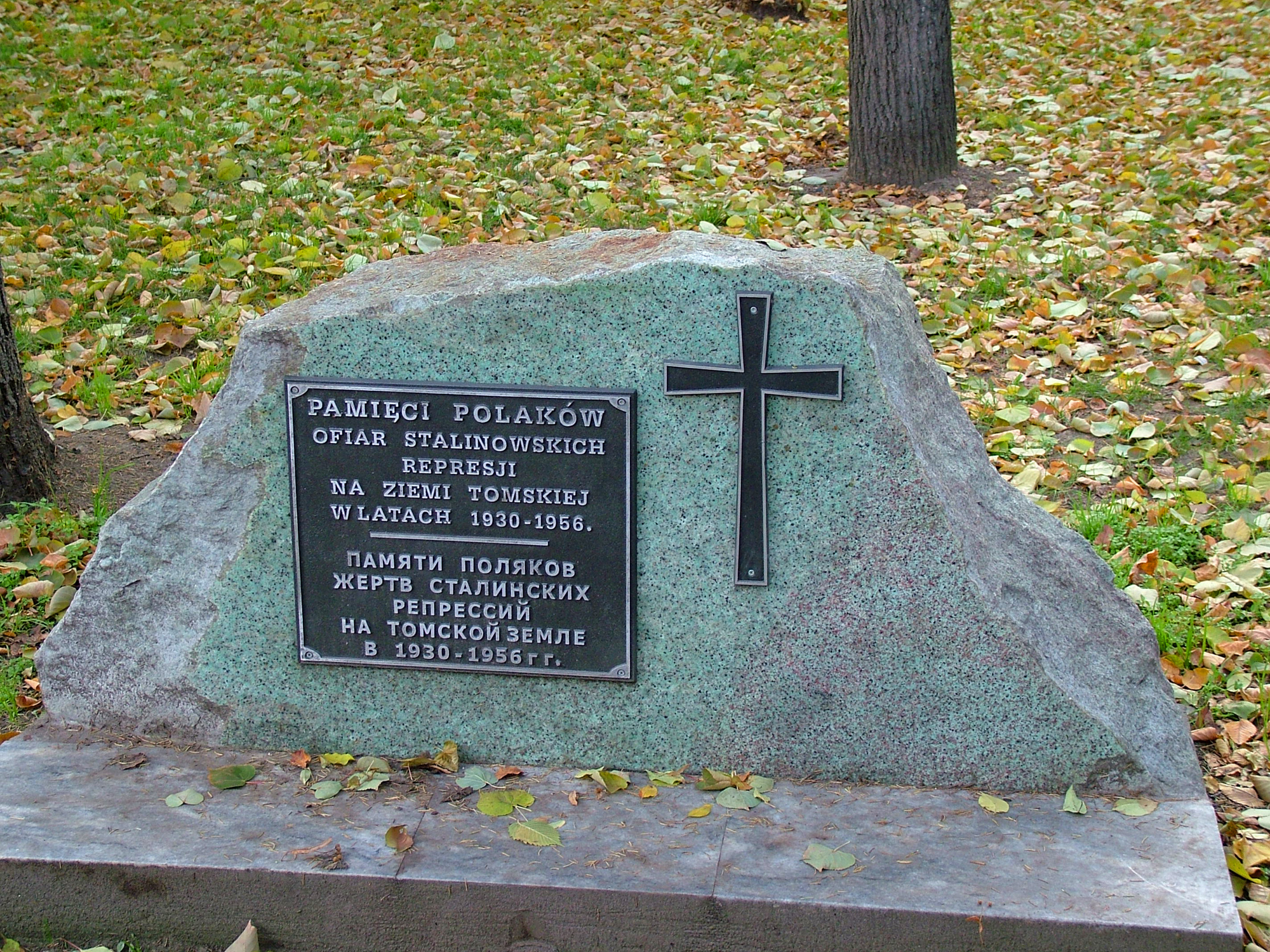
Memorial to Polish victims of Stalinist repression in Tomsk

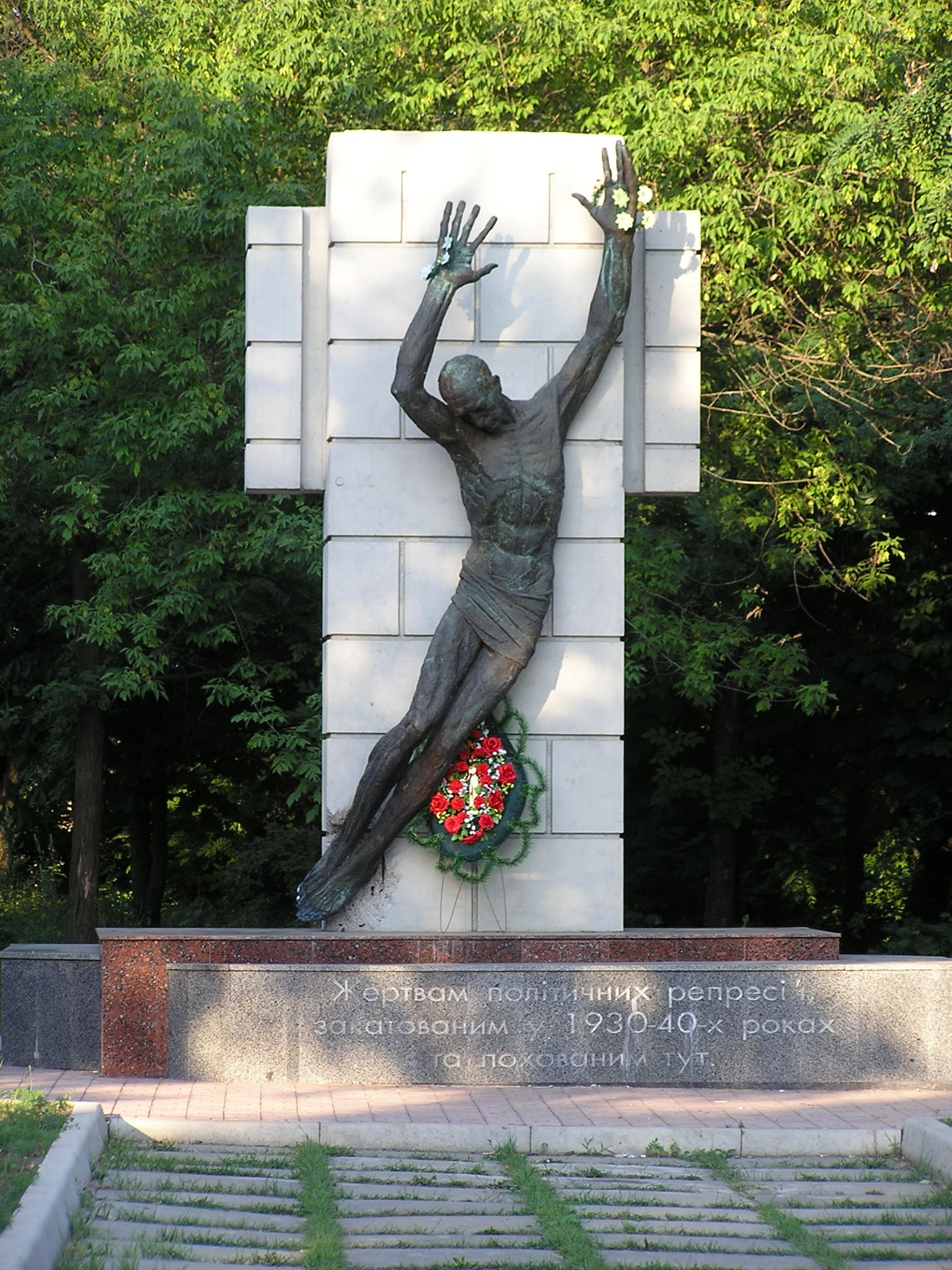
Monument to victims of political repression in Rutchenkove, near Donetsk, Ukraine

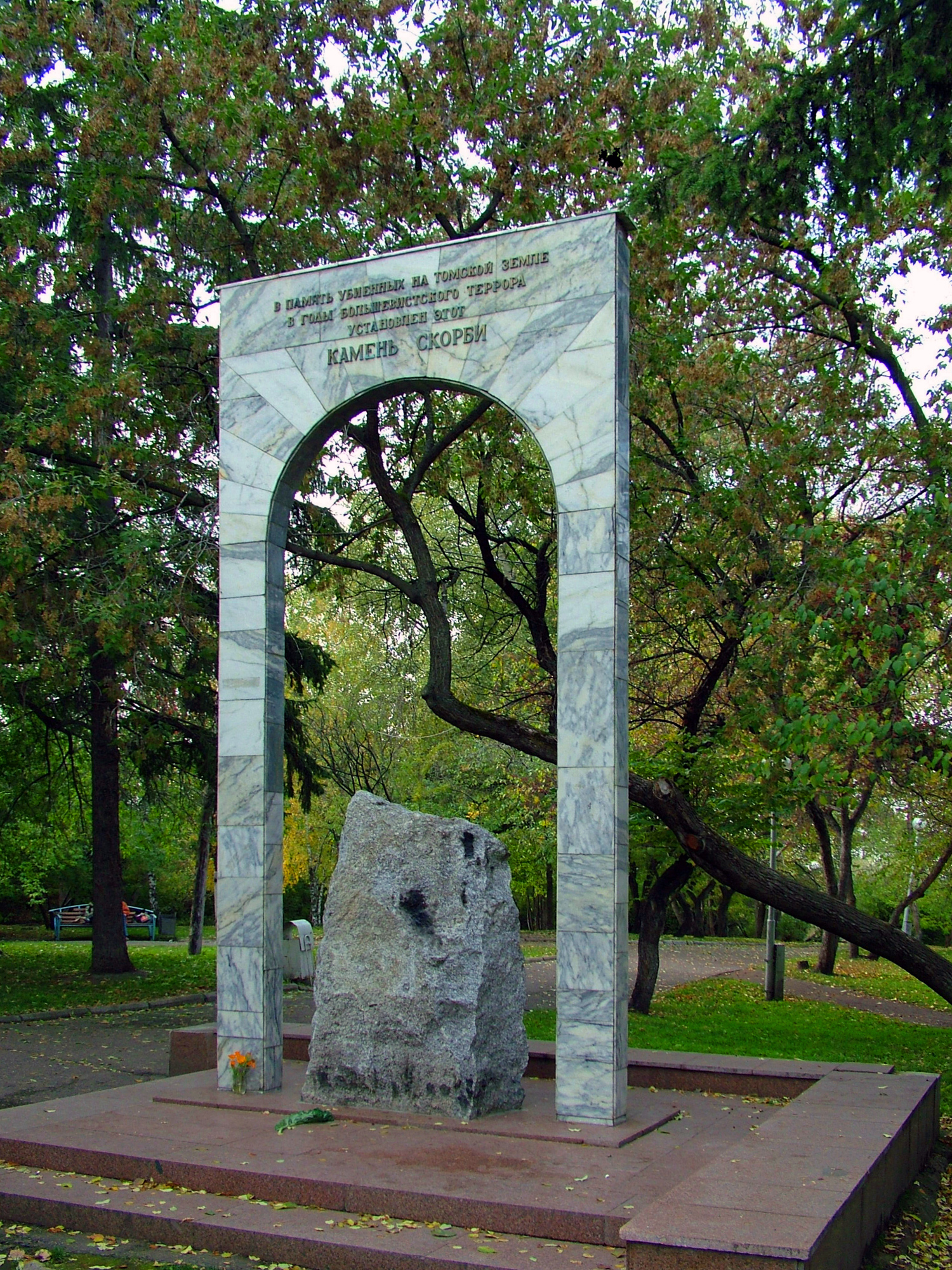
Memorial to victims of Stalinist repression in Tomsk

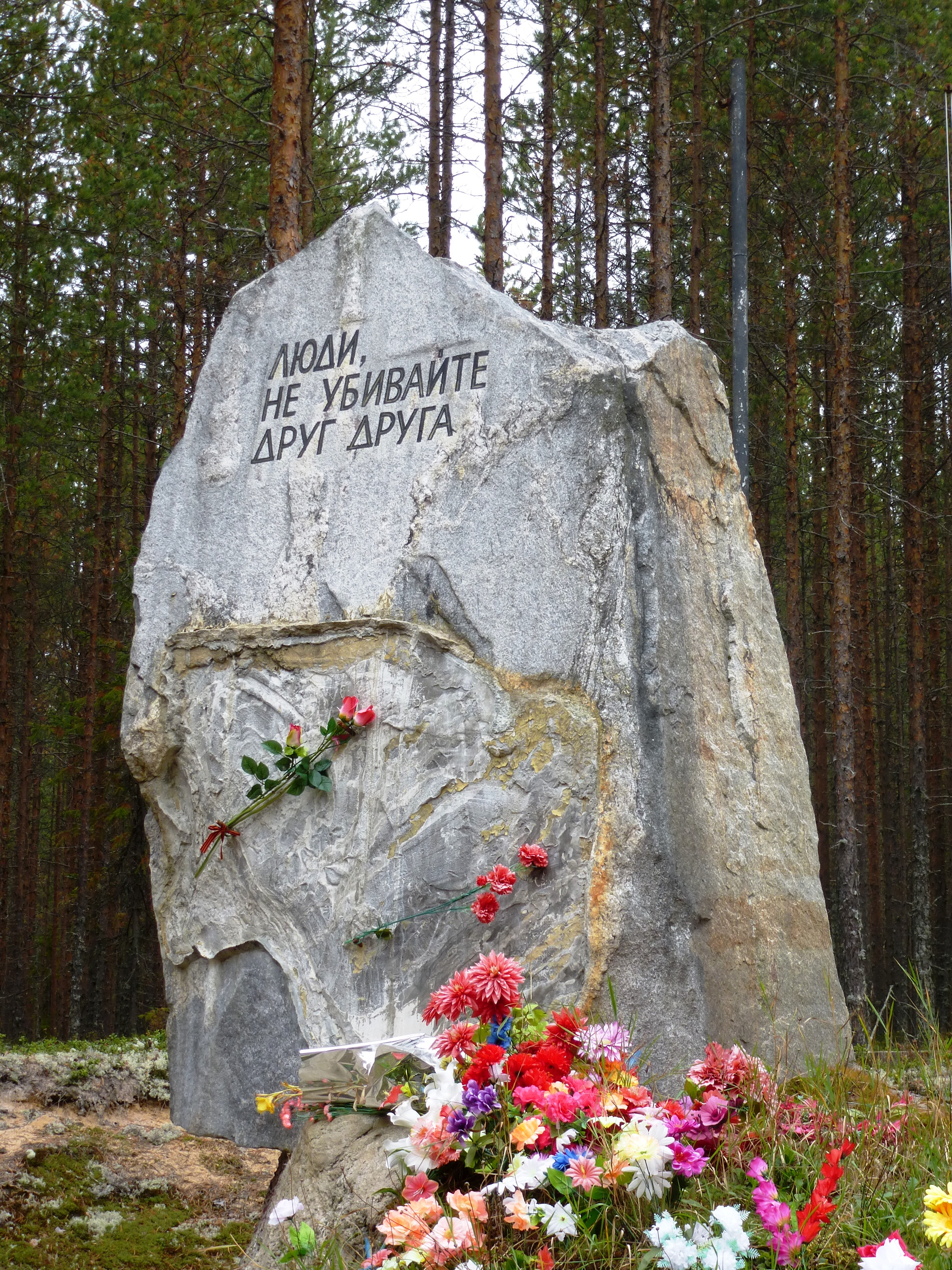
Monument at entrance to the Sandarmokh burial grounds reading, "People! Do not kill one another"

== Historiography ==
=== Totalitarian School ===
Sovietologists Merle Fainsod and Joseph Berliner pioneered American scholarship on the Great Purge, arguing that the Soviet system in the 1930s was totalitarian and dominated by terror, but that citizens wielded responsibility in reporting local officials to national leadership.

Political scientist and Polish American diplomat Zbigniew Brzezinski interpreted the Great Purge as a means for the Soviet Union to maintain its citizens in a state of fear and uncertainty to stay in power (Brzezinski, 1958).

According to Nikita Khrushchev's 1956 speech "On the Cult of Personality and Its Consequences" and popular historian Robert Conquest, many accusations (notably those presented at the Moscow show trials) were based on forced confessions obtained through torture and on a loose interpretation of Article 58 of the RSFSR Penal Code dealing with counter-revolutionary crimes. Due process, as defined by Soviet law in force at the time, was often largely replaced with summary proceedings by NKVD troikas.

In the late 1960s, historians began claiming that terror was a central feature of Soviet governance, and characterizing Stalin as a master planner and executor. Scholars based their arguments on memoirs of Soviet citizens who had no contact with the leader himself, and amplified the worries of émigrés that leadership was attacking all forms of “humanity, culture, and family life.” Totalitarian School historians such as Roy Medvedev claimed that “all [Soviet citizens] were victims of oppression.”

Some view the purge as the culmination of a social-engineering campaign which started at the beginning of the 1930s.

In his memoir, Valentin Berezhkov (Stalin's interpreter in 1941) suggests parallels between Hitler's inner-party purge and Stalin's mass repression of Old Bolsheviks, military commanders and intellectuals.

=== Revisionist School ===
Revisionist historians of the Great Purge argue that totalitarian scholars overestimate the Soviet government’s control over every sphere of daily life, and explain the purges by theorizing that rival factions exploited Stalin's paranoia and used terror to enhance their own positions. They claim that while the Soviet regime may have used fear to limit free speech and political expression, many citizens were still able to air their grievances or push back against political decisions. Revisionists point also to the strong political tensions and dissidence which existed during the Great Purge era to push back on totalitarian theory.

According to an October 1993 study in The American Historical Review, much of the Great Purge was directed against widespread banditry and criminal activity in the Soviet Union at the time.

Revisionists have also questioned the scope and targets of the Great Purge. Robert W. Thurston wrote that the purge was not intended to subdue the Soviet masses (many of whom helped implement it), but to deal with opposition to Stalin's rule by the Soviet elites. Thurston also argues that Stalin was not a "cold mastermind" of state terror, but rather he initiated or reacted to developments during the Purge.

Some scholars argue that governments and scholars emphasized repression during the Great Purges during the dissolution of the Soviet Union to justify the imposition of free markets on post-Soviet states and the liberalization of Russian politics.

According to historian James Harris, contemporary archival research pokes "rather large holes in the traditional story" woven by Conquest and others. His findings, while not exonerating Stalin or the Soviet state, dispel the notion that the bloodletting was merely the result of Stalin attempting to establish his own personal dictatorship; evidence suggests he was committed to building the socialist state envisioned by Lenin. The real motivation for the terror was an exaggerated fear of counterrevolution:

So what was the motivation behind the Terror? The answers required a lot more digging, but it gradually became clearer that the violence of the late 1930s was driven by fear. Most Bolsheviks, Stalin among them, believed that the revolutions of 1789, 1848 and 1871 had failed because their leaders hadn't adequately anticipated the ferocity of the counter-revolutionary reaction from the establishment. They were determined not to make the same mistake.

=== Other Interpretations ===
Marxist historian Isaac Deutscher regarded the Moscow trials "as the prelude to the destruction of an entire generation of revolutionaries".

Trotsky viewed the violence characteristic of the purge as an ideological difference between Stalinism and Bolshevism:

The present purge draws between Bolshevism and Stalinism not simply a bloody line but a whole river of blood. The annihilation of all the older generation of Bolsheviks, an important part of the middle generation which participated in the civil war, and that part of the youth that took up most seriously the Bolshevik traditions, shows not only a political but a thoroughly physical incompatibility between Bolshevism and Stalinism. How can this not be seen?

Peter Whitewood examined the first purge (directed at the army) and suggested a third interpretation: Stalin and other top leaders believing that they were surrounded by capitalist enemies and worried about the vulnerability and loyalty of the Red Army. "Stalin attacked the Red Army because he seriously misperceived a serious security threat", and "Stalin seems to have genuinely believed that foreign‐backed enemies had infiltrated the ranks and managed to organize a conspiracy at the very heart of the Red Army." The purge hit deeply from June 1937 to November 1938, removing 35,000; many were executed. Experience in carrying out the purge facilitated purging other elements of the Soviet polity. Historians cite the disruption as a factor in the Red Army's disastrous military performance during the German invasion.

== Notable victims ==
=== Intelligentsia ===
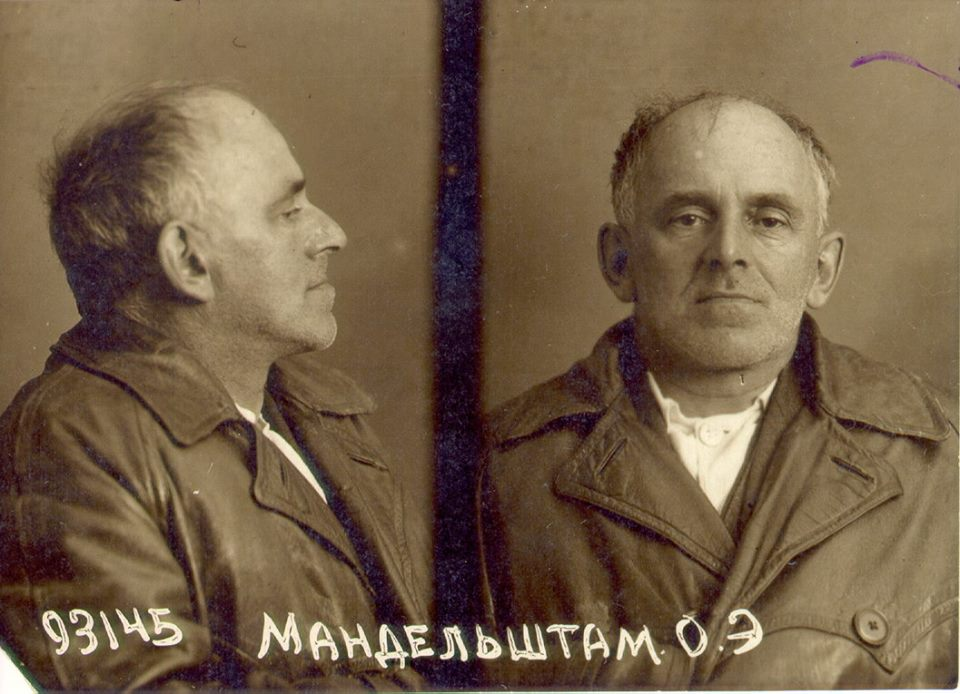
1938 NKVD arrest photo of poet Osip Mandelstam, who died in a labor camp

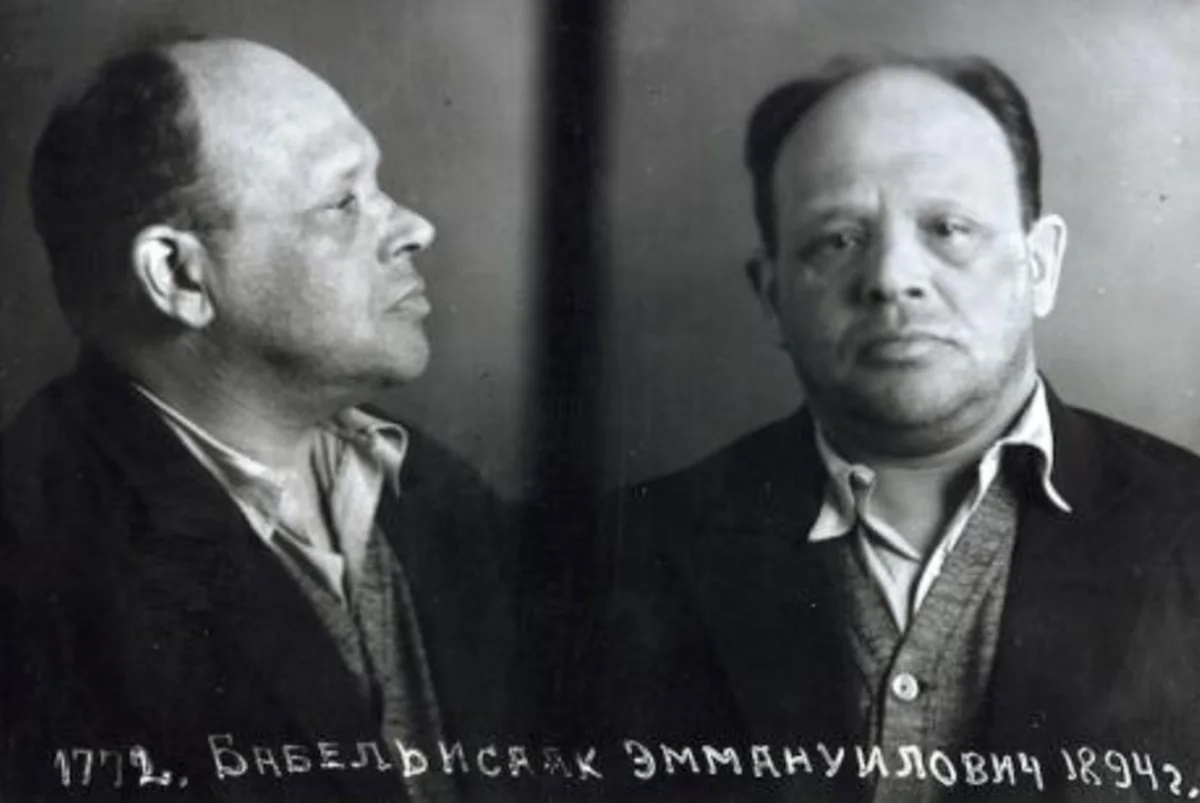
NKVD photo of writer Isaac Babel after his arrest

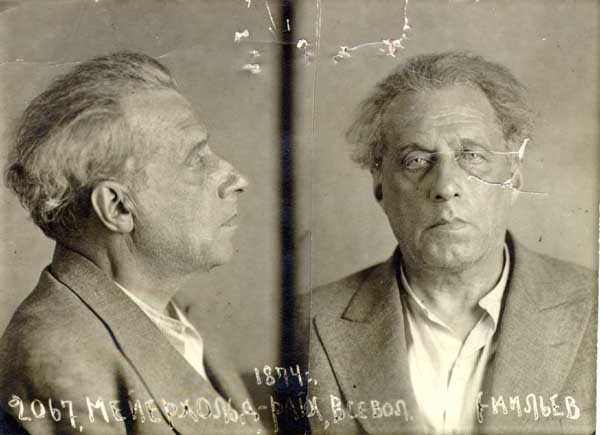
Theatre director Vsevolod Meyerhold at the time of his arrest

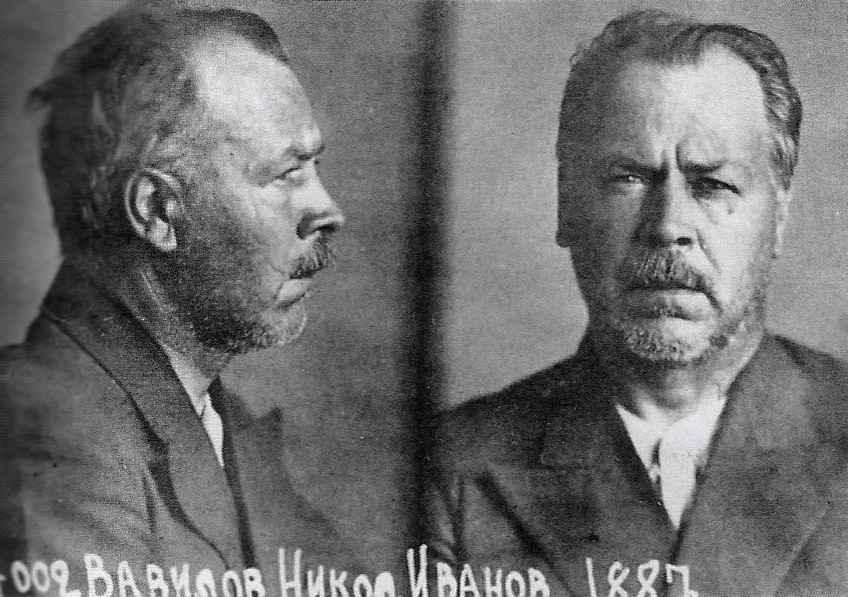
Botanist Nikolai Vavilov at the time of his arrest

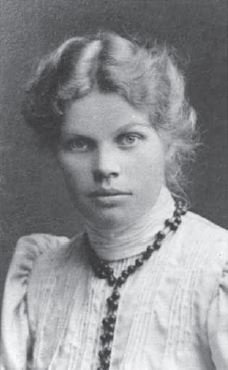
Aino Forsten (1885–1937), Finnish educator and Social Democratic politician, arrested and executed

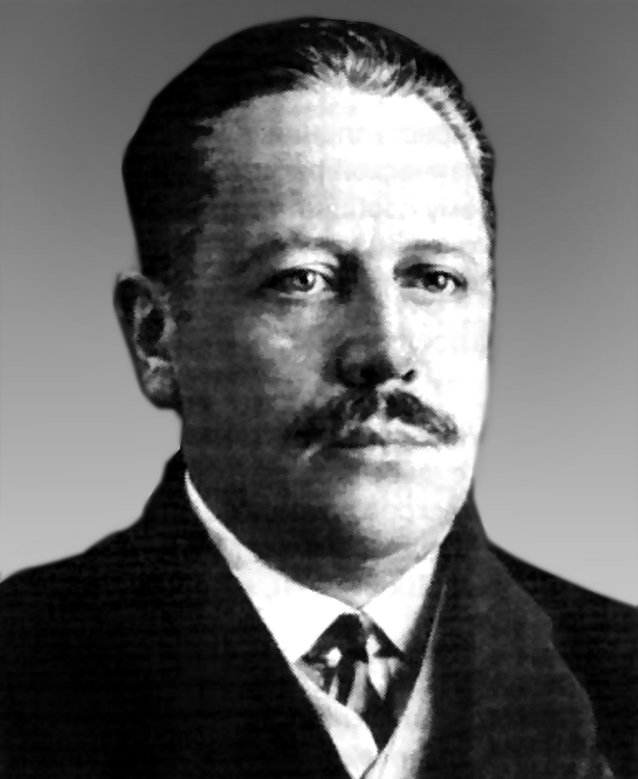
Paleontologist and geologist Dmitrii Mushketov, executed in 1938

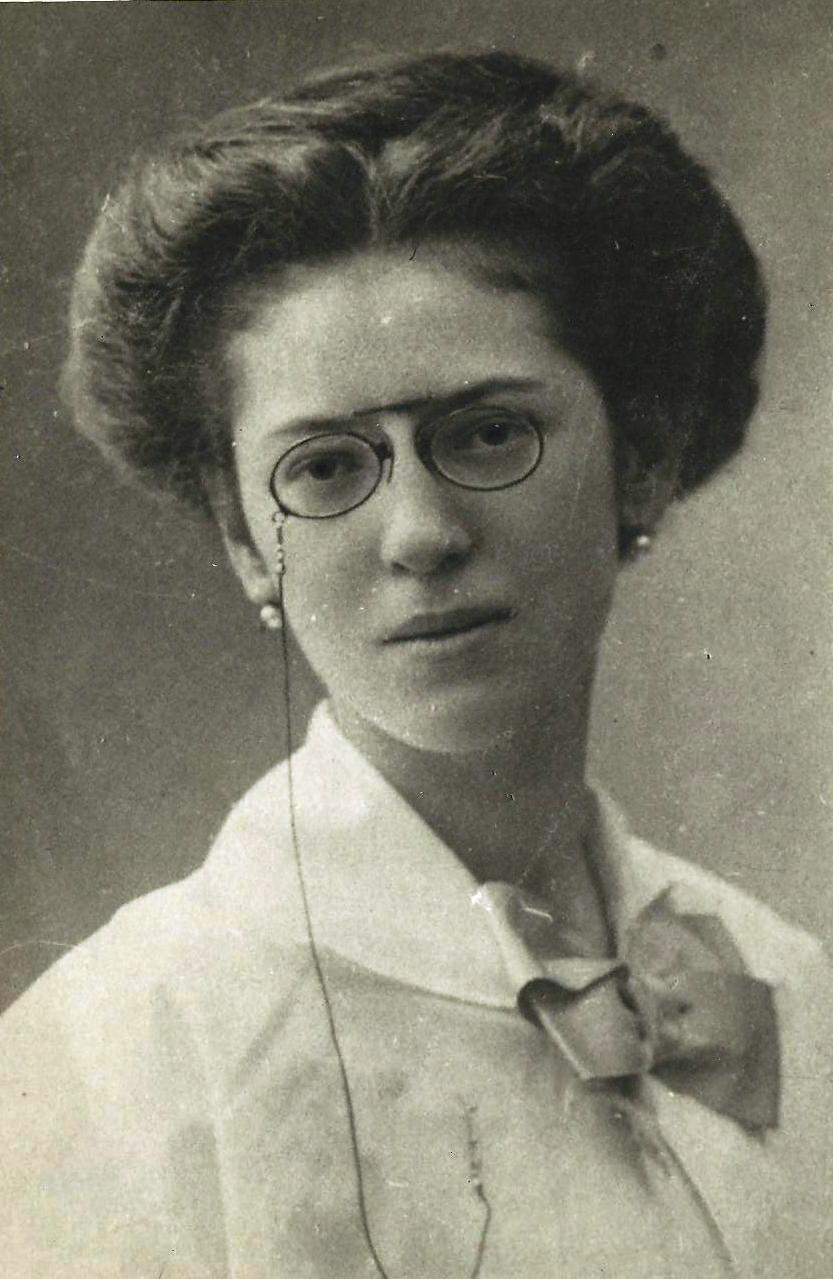
Pianist Khadija Gayibova, executed in 1938

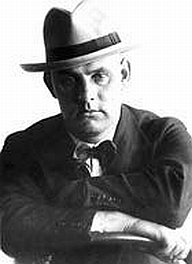
Vasili Oshchepkov, who popularized judo in the USSR and co-invented sambo. Accused of being a Japanese spy, he was extrajudicially executed in the Butyrka in 1938.

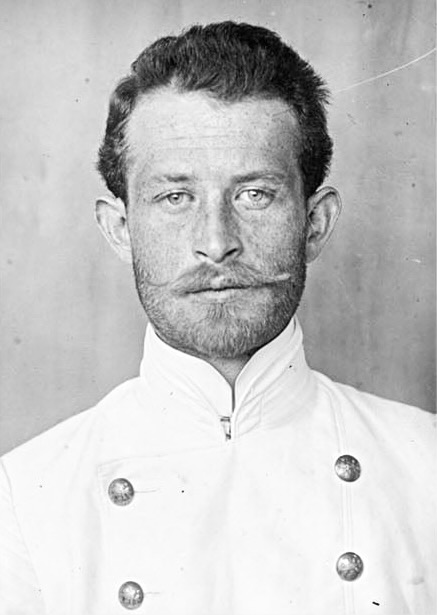
Samson Dadiani was one of numerous Georgian lawmakers to be executed

Those who perished during the Great Purge include:

- Theoretical physicist Matvei Bronstein, pioneer of quantum gravity was arrested, accused of fictional "terroristic" activity and shot in 1938.
- Nikolai Vavilov, Russian geneticist and botanist who made contributions to agricultural science such as the law of homologous series in variation and the origins of cultivated plants. Fired in 1935, he died in prison in 1943 after a dispute with Trofim Lysenko which contributed to a decline in Soviet genetic research.
- Soviet lead engineer Sergei Korolev, responsible for overseeing the launch of Sputnik 1 and first human in space, was arrested, imprisoned and originally sentenced for execution under Stalin's orders. This order extended to 74 military specialists and engineers during the purges before Korolev had his sentence commuted to hard labour in a state camp for intellectuals.
- Director of the Scientific Research Institue and Soviet engineer, Ivan Kleymyonov, was falsely arrested and executed as an alleged spy in 1938.
- Soviet scientist and Chief Engineer in the Scientific Research Institute, Georgy Langemak, was falsely arrested and executed as an alleged spy in 1938.
- Experimental physicist Lev Shubnikov, considered the "Soviet founding father of Soviet low-temperature physics" known for discovering the Shubnikov–de Haas effect and type-II superconductivity and one of the first to discover antiferromagnetism. Shubnikov was executed in 1937.
- Soviet economist Nikolai Kondratiev, a proponent of the New Economic Policy who developed the business-cycle theory known as Kondratiev waves. Kondratiev was executed in 1938.
- Valerian Obolensky, Soviet economist and chair of the Supreme Soviet of the National Economy and Professor of the Agricultural Academy in Moscow but was eventually executed on fabricated charges in 1938.
- Isaak Rubin, Soviet economist and classical Marxist noted for Essays on Marx's Theory of Value, arrested and executed in 1937
- Evgeny Pashukanis, Lithuanian legal scholar noted for The General Theory of Law and Marxism who was arrested and died during Stalin's purges
- Vladimir Milyutin, Russian economist, politician and statistician, who supported a socialist coalition government in 1917 and workers' control. Died under Stalin's purges in 1937.
- Astronomer Boris Numerov, founder of the Computing Institute in 1919 and noted for his expertise in applied celestial mechanics before the Second World War. He was executed in 1941.
- Soviet engineer and inventor Ivan Kleymyonov, a key founder of Soviet rocketry and chief of the Gas Dynamics Laboratory. Kleymyonov was executed in 1938.
- Soviet astrophysicist and astronomer Boris Gerasimovich, director of the Pulkovo Observatory. Gerasimovich, arrested with 13 other astronomers, was executed in 1938.
- Soviet engineer and Supreme Council of the National Economy chair Pyotr Bogdanov, who oversaw Soviet construction projects and nationalization of the chemical industry. Bogdanov was executed in 1939.
- Soviet military theorist and general Alexander Svechin was a leading thinker in the field during the 1920s and noted for his work, Strategy, before he was purged in 1938.
- Poet Aleksei Gastev, director of the Central Institute of Labour and a pioneering theorist of scientific management of labour in the Soviet Union. His son, Yuri Gastev, was a prominent Soviet cybernetician, emigre and political dissident.
- German Jewish mathematician Fritz Noether fled Nazi Germany in 1934. The brother of mathematician Emmy Noether (who made contributions to abstract algebra, he contributed to the Herglotz–Noether theorem in special relativity. Albert Einstein futilely pleaded his case before his execution as an accused German spy.
- Poet Osip Mandelstam was arrested for reciting his anti-Stalin poem, the "Stalin Epigram" to his circle of friends in 1934. After intervention by Nikolai Bukharin and Boris Pasternak (Stalin wrote on Bukharin's letter, "Who gave them the right to arrest Mandelstam?"), Stalin instructed the NKVD to "isolate but preserve" him. Mandelstam, exiled to Cherdyn for three years, was arrested again in May 1938 for "counter-revolutionary activities". Sentenced to five years in correction camps on 2 August 1938, he died on 27 December 1938 at a transit camp near Vladivostok. Pasternak was nearly purged; Stalin reportedly crossed his name off the list, saying "Don't touch this cloud dweller."
- Writer Isaac Babel was arrested in May 1939. On his blood-stained confession paper, he "admitted" being a member of a Trotskyist organization and being recruited by French writer André Malraux to spy for France. In the final interrogation, he retracted his confession and wrote to the prosecutor's office that he had implicated innocent people. Babel was tried before an NKVD troika and convicted of spying for the French, Austrians and Leon Trotsky and "membership in a terrorist organization". On 27 January 1940, he was shot in Butyrka prison.
- Nikolai Sukhanov, chronicler of the Russian Revolution, agrarian economist, revolutionary intellectual and editor of an opposition newspaper, was first arrested during the 1931 Menshevik Trial and arrested again in 1937 for alleged espionage. He was executed in 1940.
- Writer Boris Pilnyak was arrested on 28 October 1937 for counter-revolutionary activities, spying and terrorism. One report alleged that "he held secret meetings with [André] Gide, and supplied him with information about the situation in the USSR. There is no doubt that Gide used this information in his book attacking the USSR." Pilnyak was tried on 21 April 1938; in a 15-minute proceeding, he was condemned to death and executed shortly afterwards.
- Theatre director Vsevolod Meyerhold was arrested in 1939 and shot in February 1940 for "spying" for Japanese and British intelligence. His wife, actress Zinaida Raikh, was murdered in her apartment. In a 13 January 1940 letter to Molotov, Meyerhold wrote:
  The investigators began to use force on me, a sick 65-year-old man. I was made to lie face down and beaten on the soles of my feet and my spine with a rubber strap ... For the next few days, when those parts of my legs were covered with extensive internal hemorrhaging, they again beat the red-blue-and-yellow bruises with the strap and the pain was so intense that it felt as if boiling water was being poured on these sensitive areas. I howled and wept from the pain. I incriminated myself in the hope that by telling them lies I could end the ordeal. When I lay down on the cot and fell asleep, after 18 hours of interrogation, in order to go back in an hour's time for more, I was woken up by my own groaning and because I was jerking about like a patient in the last stages of typhoid fever.
- Georgian poet Titsian Tabidze was arrested on 10 October 1937 for treason and was tortured in prison. He named the 18th-century Georgian poet Besiki as his accomplice in anti-Soviet activities, and was executed on 16 December 1937.
- Tabidze's lifelong friend and fellow poet, Paolo Iashvili, forced to denounce several of his associates as enemies of the people, shot himself with a hunting gun in the Writers' Union building. He witnessed and was forced to participate in public trials that ousted many of his associates from the Writers' Union, effectively condemning them to death. When Lavrentiy Beria, chief of the Soviet security and secret police apparatus under Stalin and head of the NKVD, presented Iashvili with the alternatives of denouncing Tabidze or being arrested and tortured by the NKVD, Iashvili died by suicide.
- In early 1937, poet Pavel Nikolayevich Vasiliev reportedly defended Nikolai Bukharin as "a man of the highest nobility and the conscience of peasant Russia" at the time of his denunciation at the Pyatakov Trial (Second Moscow Trial) and damned other writers signing routine condemnations as "pornographic scrawls on the margins of Russian literature". He was shot on 16 July 1937.
- Jan Sten, philosopher and deputy head of the Marx-Engels Institute, was Stalin's private tutor when Stalin studied Hegel's dialectic. (Stalin received lessons twice a week from 1925 to 1928, but found it difficult to master the basic ideas. He became hostile to German idealistic philosophy, which he called "the aristocratic reaction to the French Revolution".) Sten joined an underground opposition group which later joined the Bloc of Soviet Oppositions, then led by Trotsky. Sten was arrested in 1937 on orders from Stalin, who called him one of the chief "Menshevizing idealists". On 19 June 1937, Sten was killed in Lefortovo prison.
- David Riazanov, Soviet historian and founder of the Marx-Engels Institute, was an old associate of Trotsky. Arrested and put to death in 1938.
- Poet Nikolai Klyuev was arrested in 1933 for contradicting Soviet ideology, and was shot in October 1937.
- Russian linguist Nikolai Durnovo, a member of the Durnovo family, was executed on 27 October 1937. He created a classification of Russian dialects that was a base for modern scientific linguistic nomenclature.
- Mari poet and playwright Sergei Chavain was executed in Yoshkar-Ola on 11 November 1937. The State prize of Mari El is named after Chavain.
- Ukrainian theater and movie director Les Kurbas, considered by many to be the most important Ukrainian theater director of the 20th century, was shot on 3 November 1937.
- Russian writer and explorer Maximilian Kravkov was arrested for allegedly participating in the "Japanese-SR Terrorist Subversive Espionage Organization". He was executed on 12 October 1937.
- Russian Esperanto writer and translator Nikolai Nekrasov was arrested in 1938 for being "an organizer and leader of a fascist, espionage, terrorist organization of Esperantists", and was executed on 4 October 1938. Another Esperanto writer, Vladimir Varankin, was executed on 3 October 1938.
- Playwright and avant-garde poet Nikolay Oleynikov was arrested and executed for "subversive writing" on 24 November 1937.
- Yakut writer Platon Oyunsky, a founder of modern Yakut literature, died in prison in 1939.
- Kazakh linguist and educator Akhmet Baitursynov, a founder of modern Kazakh linguistics and a leading member of the Alash Orda movement, was arrested and executed on 8 December 1937.
- Kazakh political leader and economist Alikhan Bukeikhanov, head of the Alash Orda autonomy movement and advocate for Kazakh political self-government, was arrested and executed on 27 September 1937.
- Kazakh poet and educator Magzhan Zhumabayev, a leading figure of early modern Kazakh literature, was arrested and executed on 19 March 1938.
- Russian dramaturge Adrian Piotrovsky, responsible for creating the synopsis of Sergei Prokofiev's ballet Romeo and Juliet, was executed on 21 November 1937.
- Boris Shumyatsky, de facto executive producer for the Soviet film monopoly from 1930 to 1937, was executed as a "traitor" in 1938 after a purge of the Soviet film industry.
- Sinologist Julian Shchutsky was convicted as a "Japanese spy" and executed on 2 February 1938.
- Russian linguist Nikolai Nevsky, an expert in East Asian languages, was arrested by the NKVD on the charge of being a "Japanese spy". He and his Japanese wife, Isoko Mantani-Nevsky, were executed on 27 November 1937.
- Ukrainian drama writer Mykola Kulish, a lead figure in the Executed Renaissance, was executed on 3 November 1937.
- After sunspot-development research was judged un-Marxist, 27 astronomers disappeared between 1936 and 1938. The Meteorological Office was purged as early as 1933 for failing to predict weather harmful to crops.

== See also ==
- Leningrad affair
- Anti-Rightist Campaign
- Excess mortality in the Soviet Union under Joseph Stalin
- Timeline of the Great Purge
- History of the Soviet Union (1927–1953)
- Armenian victims of the Great Purge
- Family members of a traitor to the Motherland
- Orphans in the Soviet Union#Children of "enemies of the people", 1937–1945
- Mass killings under communist regimes
- Lustration
- Stalinist repressions in Azerbaijan
- Holodomor
- The Commissar Vanishes

=== Similar events ===
- Cultural Revolution and the Great Leap Forward (China)
- Hungarian Revolution
- Khmer Rouge genocide (Cambodia)
- 30 September killings (Indonesia)
- Prague Spring (Czechoslovakia)

==== Similar political purges ====
- 1979 Ba'ath Party Purge (Iraq)
- Indonesian mass killings of 1965–66 (Indonesia)
- Dirty War (Argentina)
- White Terror (Spain)
- Bodo League massacre (South Korea)
