= Vartan Ter-Oganezov =

Soviet astronomer

Vartan T. Ter-Oganezov
- Born: Vartan T. Ter-Oganezian; 10 October 1890; Tbilisi
- Died: 1963 (aged 72–73)
- Known for: Dialectical materialism, Marxist ideology in astronomy

Vartan Ter-Oganezov (10 October 1890-1963) was a Soviet pseudoscientist. He is best known for his ideologically motivated pseudoastronomy and denial of the theory of general relativity and the Big Bang theory on the grounds that they contradicted the Soviet state ideology of dialectical materialism, and for his involvement in the persecution of Soviet astrophysicists and cosmologists during the Great Purge. Ter-Oganezov's ideological fringe theories and leading role in the arrest and execution of Soviet astrophysicists have led him to be dubbed "the Lysenko of Soviet astronomy".

== Early life and career ==
Vartan Ter-Oganezov was born on 10 October 1890 as V. T. Ter-Oganezian in Tiflis to an Armenian noble family. He became part of the faculty at St. Petersburg University and became a member of the Russian Astronomical Society in 1914. He performed very poorly in university and only barely graduated. He began teaching at the Moscow Geological-Prospecting Institute in 1918 and helped organise the reform of Kazan University in 1919.

== Pseudoscientific views ==
Throughout his career, Ter-Oganezov was involved in politically motivated advocacy of alternate theories to the theory that the universe was expanding, on the grounds that this theory contradicted the official Soviet ideology of Marxist-Leninist dialectical materialism. He is known to have opposed Albert Einstein's theory of general relativity since at least 1922. In 1928, the Soviet government decreed that all science must adhere to Marxist ideology, engendering an environment highly amenable for Ter-Oganezov and other politically motivated pseudoscientists and giving state backing to their attacks on mainstream astrophysics. Ter-Oganezov believed the idea of an expanding universe violated the conservation of matter and expressed support for Fritz Zwicky's interpretation of cosmological redshift as the result of gravitational drag. He asserted that even if this redshift was found to because of recessional velocity, the only correct interpretation of it could come from "materialist" science instead of "idealist" science. Ter-Oganezov likewise denounced Lev Landau for his research into beta decay as the source of stellar energy, viewing this hypothesis as a violation of the law of conservation of energy as well as condemning it for being linked to "idealism" and "papism". Ter-Oganezov also made fanciful claims about the Academy of Sciences' Commission for Study of the Sun (KISO), which was organised to provide daily measurements of solar activity and which Ter-Oganezov claimed would enable long-range weather forecasts.

== Opposition to the Catholic Church ==
Ter-Oganezov was militantly opposed to the Roman Catholic Church. In 1930, citing the Church's historical persecution of heliocentric theory, Ter-Oganezov authored an open letter to Pope Pius XI aggressively denounced the Church for criticising Marxism and dialectical materialism, claiming that the Church's opposition to it was the latest chapter in their crusade against science. He also demanded the Church open its archives pertaining to the Galileo affair and others so that Soviet scientists could search for secret documents relating to them.

== Rise to power ==
In 1930 occurred the arrest and exile of D. O. Sviatskii, the editor of the astronomy journal Mirovedenie, by Soviet authorities for his ideological unreliability; Ter-Oganezov took over as the editor, turning Mirovedenie into an ideological pseudojournal and a vehicle for spreading dialectical materialist pseudoscience throughout the field of astronomy. In 1934, he helped to found the All-Union Astronomical-Geodesical Society (VAGO). Ter-Oganezov was elected assistant chairman of VAGO in 1934 while A. A. Mikhailov was elected chairman; in practice, Ter-Oganezov had full control of VAGO from this point on because Mikhailov did not actively participate in the workings of the society. Ter-Oganezov used VAGO as a vehicle for the rapid promotion of young amateur astronomers into professional astronomy.

== Involvement in the Great Purge ==
In 1936, as the wider Great Purge began in the Soviet Union, Ter-Oganezov spearheaded with great enthusiasm the persecutions pertaining to astronomy and aimed to root out what he and other communist propagandists termed “wreckers”. On the night of 6-7 November 1936, nicknamed the Night of Long Knives of Soviet astronomy, a sudden mass arrest was undertaken targeting Pulkovo Observatory astronomers, including Vera F. Gaze, Naum I. Idel'son, Innokentii A. Balanovskii, Petr I. Iashnov, Nikolai V. Komendant, and Nikolai A. Kozyrev. This was followed by further arrests on 4 December 1936 of Pulkovo astronomers Dmitrii I. Eropkin and Nikolai I. Dneprovskii and on 10 February 1937 of Pulkovo's scientific secretary Maksimilian M. Musselius. Amidst this chaos and persecution, the vindictive Ter-Oganezov served on a number of committees in 1936 and 1937 investigating the alleged crimes of Pulkovo, consistently being the only committee member supporting publishing negative findings about Pulkovo. In early 1937, Ter-Oganezov aggressively attacked the notable Soviet astrophysicist Boris Gerasimovich, the director of the Pulkovo Observatory, angrily accusing him of sabotage at the plenum of the Astronomy Council of the Academy of Sciences in May 1937. Gerasimovich would end up arrested by the NKVD on 28 June 1937. Upon Gerasimovich's arrest, Mirovedenie published a vituperative denunciation of the observatory director. From 26 to 29 October 1937, the Astronomy Council of the Academy of Sciences held a meeting to denounce Gerasimovich, along with Boris Numerov and other purged Pulkovo Observatory astronomers, as "enemies of the people". Ter-Oganezov delivered a speech at this meeting levelling a cornucopia of charges against Gerasimovich and his colleagues, including disrupting KISO, preventing the Astronomy Council from planning for the Third Five-Year Plan, delaying construction of a new observatory, and giving insufficient attention to training new astronomers. Ter-Oganezov also acrimoniously denounced the Leningrad Astronomical Institute for continuing to publish the works of "wreckers" like Idel'son and Numerov after their supposed crimes had been exposed. Gerasimovich would be executed that same year, being convicted in a show trial in the Supreme Court of the USSR in Leningrad on 30 November 1937. His execution by firing squad occurred on the same day as his conviction.

== Decline in influence ==
Ter-Oganezov's influence in Soviet astronomy declined after 1937. Prior to his death in 1932, Mikhail Pokrovsky had been one of Ter-Oganezov's chief benefactors; Pokrovsky's posthumous condemnation by the Communist Party during the era of the Great Purge as an "anti-Marxist" and "anti-Leninist" blemished Ter-Oganezov's reputation. In part, Ter-Oganezov was a victim of his own success, having become too powerful during the purges to maintain his influence for long before being sidelined. The 1937 issue of Mirovedenie denouncing Gerasimovich proved to be its last, and the amateur astronomy journal ceased being published shortly afterwards. In place of Mirovedenie, the journal VAGO Journal was established, although this new journal did not imitate its predecessor in publishing copious philosophical tracts and denunciations. In 1939, Astronomicheskii zhurnal removed Ter-Oganezov from its editorial board. During World War II, Ter-Oganezov moved to Central Asian University in Tashkent, where he denounced the director of Tashkent Observatory, V. P. Shcheglov, by accusing him of producing scientific work of poor quality and delaying completion of military assignments. Shchlegov was unaffected by Ter-Oganezov's denunciations and easily rebuffed them, however.

== Zhdanovshchina ==
Following World War II, cosmology once again entered the crosshairs of the Communist Party with the start of the Zhdanovshchina, during which Andrei Zhdanov sought to forcibly align science with Marxism-Leninism and declared that astrophysics and cosmology needed to be purged of bourgeois influences. Following the successful campaign of Trofim Lysenko that led to the prohibition of genetics in August 1948, Ter-Oganezov and his ideological brethren organised VAGO conferences in Leningrad and Moscow in December 1948 devoted to attacking ideological deviations from Marxism-Leninism in the astronomical sciences. Ter-Oganezov presented a paper at the Moscow conference and did not attend the Leningrad conference, although he issued an editorial article criticising both "idealism" but also what he saw as philosophical errors committed by the Marxist critics of mainstream astrophysics themselves at the Leningrad conference. Ter-Oganezov did not have the same success as Lysenko and relativistic cosmology was never formally banned in the way genetics was. However, the crushing weight of ideological pressure nevertheless caused cosmology to fade out of existence in the Soviet Union, as astronomers self-censored and published almost no works on the subject out of fear that doing so would expose them to severe political and physical danger. Only in the 1960s, with the pioneering work of Yakov Zeldovich and other Soviet cosmologists did the field begin to recover in the Soviet Union.

== Post-Stalin career ==
Ter-Oganezov's tenure as the self-appointed censor of Soviet astronomy finally came to an end shortly after the death of Joseph Stalin in 1953. At the 1955 VAGO conference, elections were held and Ter-Oganezov was nominated to a position on its central committee, but a large number of astronomers, both professional and amateur, spoke out strongly against him. Ter-Oganezov was thus decisively defeated and did not get elected to any position at VAGO. Later in the same year, Ter-Oganezov was sacked from the position he held on the editorial board of VAGO Bulletin. This removal signified the final end of Ter-Oganezov's involvement in astronomy.

== Death ==
Ter-Oganezov died in 1963. His death went unremarked by the astronomical community, which likely found him extremely odious and unpleasant, and he did not receive an obituary in any astronomical journal, amateur or professional.
