= Concerning Anti-Soviet Elements =

1937 provision of the Politburo of the Communist Party of the Soviet Union

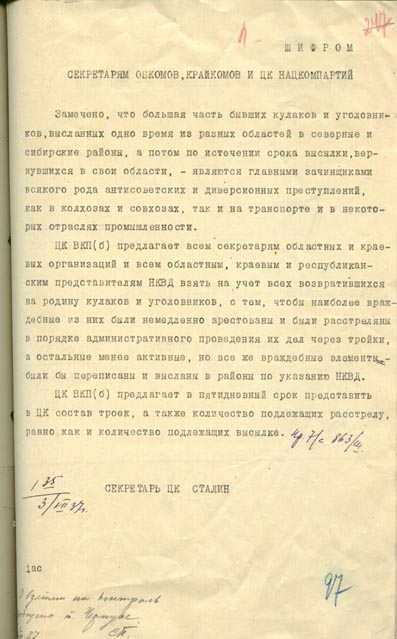
A screen shot of the 1936 document

Concerning Anti-Soviet Elements (Russian: Об антисоветских элементах) also known as Decision of the Politbureau of the CC of the VKP(b) No. P51/94 (Russian: Решение Политбюро ЦК ВКП(б) № П51/94) was a provision of the Political Bureau of the Central Committee of the Communist Party of the Soviet Union of 2 July 1937 that initiated the Great Purge.

The resolution of the document was composed and signed by Stalin for secretaries of regional committees and Central Committees of National Communist parties about necessity to take in accountability all "kulaks" (a term for affluent peasants) in order to have them arrested immediately and liquidated. Within five day the Central Committee should be provided a report on composition of troikas (NKVD special committees) and number of people who should be arrested (and executed through shooting) as well as those who were sentenced to imprisonment in forced-labor camps (in document is used a term "expulsion").

This provision triggered the Order No. 00447 of the People's Commissariat of Interior (NKVD) which was headed at that time by Nikolay Yezhov.

In Ukraine, a spike in repression activity occurred at the moment of the coming to power of a new First Secretary of the Communist Party of Ukraine, Nikita Khrushchev.

== See also ==
- Greek Operation of the NKVD
