= Specialist-baiting =

Purging of Soviet professionals by young party members (1920s–30s)

Specialist-baiting or Spetseedstvo (Russian: Спецеедство) was a sociological phenomenon in the Soviet Union in the 1920s and 1930s where proletarian and young party members attacked specialists and professionals, causing them to be politically purged from the workplace, and allowing young inexperienced and uneducated workers to take these work positions.

== See also ==
- Industrial Party Trial
- Great Purge
- New Economic Policy
- First five-year plan
- Second five-year plan
