= Outline of the Great Purge (Soviet Union) =

Great Purge
- Part of the Bolshevik Party purges
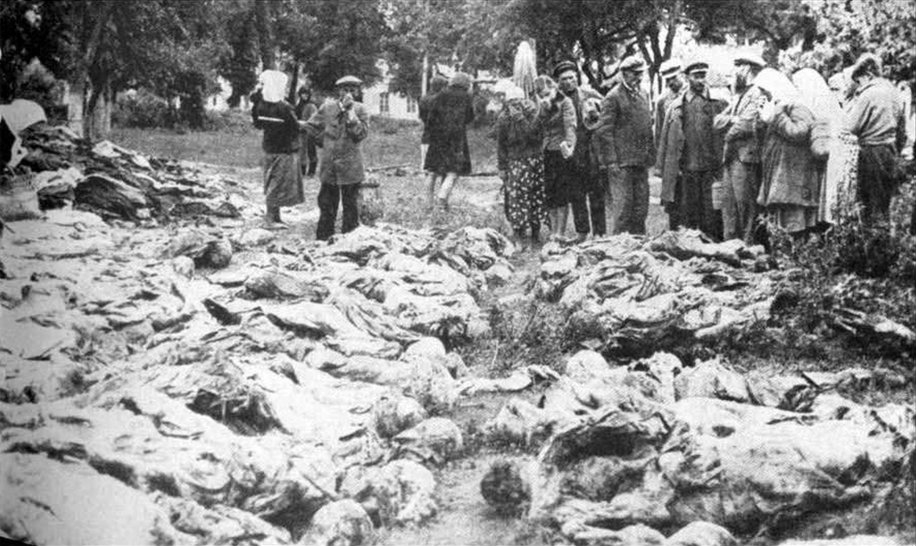
- Victims of the Vinnytsia massacre
- Location: Soviet Union
- Date: Main phase: 9 March 1936 – 10 January 1939 (2 years, 10 months and 1 day)
- Target: Political opponents, Trotskyists, Red Army leadership, kulaks, religious activists and leaders
- Deaths: 681,692 executions and 116,000 deaths in the Gulag system (official figures); 700,000 to 1.2 million (estimated)
- Perpetrators: Joseph Stalin, the NKVD (Genrikh Yagoda, Nikolai Yezhov, Lavrentiy Beria, Ivan Serov), (principle actors of the purges)
- Motive: Elimination of political opponents, consolidation of power, fear of counterrevolution, fear of party infiltration

The following outline is provided as an overview of and topical guide to English Wikipedia articles about the Great Purges. (Note: The Great Purge is sometimes referred to as the Great Terror, a term popularized by Robert Conquest.)

== About ==
The Great Purge was a mass campaign of political repression in the Soviet Union from 1936 to 1938, orchestrated by Joseph Stalin and carried out by the NKVD under Genrikh Yagoda and later Nikolai Yezhov. Triggered by the 1934 Assassination of Sergei Kirov, it included show trials, executions, and the persecution of Old Bolsheviks, Red Army officers, intellectuals, and ethnic minorities such as Soviet Poles and Volga Germans.

The campaign peaked during 1937–1938, targeting alleged "enemies of the people" including supposed wreckers, kulaks, and political rivals. Torture, forced confessions, and mass executions became standard. An estimated 700,000 to 1.2 million people were killed, and many more were imprisoned or sent to the Gulag. Stalin nevertheless, was forced to halt the purge in 1938, denouncing the NKVD’s excesses and executing both Yagoda and Yezhov. Though the purge formally ended, state repression continued until around 1952. Leon Trotsky, a key Stalin rival who had been in exile since 1929, was assassinated in 1940 by the NKVD in Mexico.

== Background ==
- History of the Soviet Union (1927–1953)
- Political repression in the Soviet Union
- NKVD
- Purges of the Communist Party of the Soviet Union
- Excess mortality in the Soviet Union under Joseph Stalin
- Old Bolsheviks

== Main articles ==
- Great Purge
- Timeline of the Great Purge
- Assassination of Sergei Kirov – 1934 killing used to justify the Purge.
- Mass operations of the NKVD – 1937–38 mass arrests and executions.
- Moscow trials – Show trials of top Bolsheviks, 1936–38.

== Nationalities ==
- Deportations of Kurds from Transcaucasia – Forced removal of Kurds during the Purge.
- Estonian Operation of the NKVD – Mass arrest and execution of ethnic Estonians.
- Finnish Operation of the NKVD – Targeting of ethnic Finns in 1937–38.
- Greek Operation – NKVD repression of ethnic Greeks in the USSR.
- Latvian Operation of the NKVD – Widespread purge of ethnic Latvians.
- Polish Operation of the NKVD – Largest ethnic-based purge, targeting Poles.
- List of Soviet repressions of Azerbaijani military officers (1920–1938) – Arrests and executions of Azerbaijani officers.

== Show trials ==
- Moscow trials – Series of public show trials, including the First Moscow Trial (Trial of the Sixteen).

=== Case of the Anti-Soviet "Bloc of Rightists and Trotskyites" ===
- Sergei Bessonov – Soviet official tried and executed in the 1938 show trial.
- Pavel Bulanov – NKVD officer turned defendant in the 1938 trial.
- Nikolai Bukharin – Prominent Bolshevik theorist executed after the 1938 trial.
- Mikhail Chernov (politician) – Soviet official purged during the trial.
- Eastern Approaches – Memoir describing Soviet show trials and purges.
- Hryhoriy Hrynko – Ukrainian Soviet politician executed in the trial.
- Vladimir Ivanov (politician, born 1893) – Soviet official purged in 1938.
- Fayzulla Xoʻjayev – Uzbek SSR leader executed in the 1938 trial.
- Nikolay Krestinsky – Former Bolshevik leader forced to confess, then executed.
- Pyotr Kryuchkov – Gorky’s secretary, implicated and executed in the trial.
- Lev Levin – Kremlin doctor accused in the trial and executed.
- Dmitry Pletnyov (doctor) – Eminent cardiologist, tortured and executed.
- Christian Rakovsky – Diplomat and former Trotskyist, executed after the trial.
- Alexei Rykov – Former Soviet premier, tried and executed in 1938.
- Vasily Sharangovich – Belarusian official executed after the 1938 show trial.
- Genrikh Yagoda – Former NKVD chief, purged and executed during the trial.
- Isaak Zelensky – Soviet official and early Bolshevik, purged in 1938.
- Prokopy Zubarev – Soviet official tried and executed with Bukharin.

=== Case of the Trotskyist Anti-Soviet Military Organization ===
The 1937 secret trial of top Red Army commanders.

- Zinovy Ushakov – Military officer tried in the case.
- Roberts Eidemanis – Red Army commander and defendant.
- Boris Feldman – Senior military officer implicated.
- Yan Gamarnik – High-ranking officer involved in the case.
- August Kork – Red Army commander tried and executed.
- Vitaly Primakov – Marshal and defendant in the trial.
- Vitovt Putna – Komdiv prosecuted and executed.
- Mikhail Tukhachevsky – Marshal of the Soviet Union, central defendant in the trial.
- Ieronim Uborevich – Red Army corps commander, one of the accused.
- Iona Yakir – Corps commander prosecuted in the case.

=== Trial of the Seventeen ===
1937 show trial targeting former Trotskyists and economic planners.

- Yakov Drobnis – Defendant and former Bolshevik; confessed and executed.
- Nikolay Muralov – Veteran revolutionary; refused to recant Trotskyism, executed.
- Georgy Pyatakov – Deputy People’s Commissar; confessed and executed in 1937.
- Karl Radek – Soviet journalist and propagandist; sentenced to labor camp, later killed.
- Leonid Serebryakov – High-ranking party official; confessed and executed.
- Grigory Sokolnikov – Former finance commissar; sentenced to prison, later murdered.

=== Trial of the Sixteen ===
1936 show trial of prominent Bolsheviks accused of plotting against Stalin.

- Ivan Bakayev – Old Bolshevik accused and executed in the 1936 show trial.
- Konon Berman-Yurin – Defendant who falsely claimed links to Trotsky; executed.
- Lev Kamenev – Former Politburo member; main defendant in the 1936 trial.
- Sergei Mrachkovsky – Former Red Army commander and defendant; executed.
- Ivan Smirnov (politician) – Veteran Bolshevik; confessed under duress and was executed.
- Vagarshak Ter-Vaganyan – Soviet journalist and defendant; executed after trial.
- Vasiliy Ulrikh – Chief judge who presided over the Moscow trials.
- Andrey Vyshinsky – State prosecutor who led the case and demanded executions.
- Grigory Zinoviev – Prominent Bolshevik leader and key defendant; executed in 1936.

=== Union for the Freedom of Ukraine trial ===
1930 show trial of Ukrainian intellectuals accused of nationalist conspiracy.

- Yulian Bachynsky – Ukrainian diplomat and political thinker; linked to nationalist activities.
- Volodymyr Chekhivskyi – Former Ukrainian prime minister; accused in the 1930 trial.
- Mikhail Mikhailik – Ukrainian publicist and political figure; defendant in the trial.
- Anton Prykhodko – Ukrainian historian and accused conspirator; sentenced during the trial.
- Serhiy Yefremov – Prominent Ukrainian academic and politician; key defendant, sentenced to labor camps.

== Genocide of the Ingrian Finns ==
Ethnic purge in 1937‑38 targeting Finns, including Ingrians, as part of larger NKVD operations.

- Border Security Zone of Russia – Restricted buffer areas created near the Finnish border, used to control and relocate Ingrian populations.
- Deportations of the Ingrian Finns – Mass forced relocations starting in the late 1920s through WWII, central to the genocide.
- Genocide of the Ingrian Finns – Main article detailing the systematic persecution, deportation, and cultural destruction.
- Levashovo Memorial Cemetery – Burial site near Leningrad for many Ingrian victims.
- Siberian Finns – Communities of Finns deported to Siberia, including Ingrians.
- Soviet Ingria – The historical region of Ingria under Soviet rule, focus of repressive policies.

== Latvian Operation of the NKVD ==
1937–38 mass purge targeting ethnic Latvians.

- Yakov Alksnis – Latvian-born Red Army commander executed in the purge.
- Juris Aploks – Latvian military officer purged during the operation.
- Ernest Appoga – Soviet Latvian politician arrested and shot.
- Karl Bauman – Soviet functionary of Latvian descent executed.
- Jan Antonovich Berzin – Former military-political leader executed.
- Yan Karlovich Berzin – Soviet intelligence chief of Latvian origin, purged.
- Jūlijs Daniševskis – Member of Latvian Communist Party killed in the purge.
- Robert Eikhe – Soviet official of Latvian heritage, arrested and shot.
- Gustav Klutsis – Renowned Latvian avant-garde artist executed during the purge.
- Vilhelm Knorin – Latvian Bolshevik and Soviet official purged and executed.
- Martin Latsis – Prominent Latvian Cheka leader later shot.
- Marija Leiko – Actress of Latvian origin executed in the operation.
- Ivan Strod – Latvian-born Red Army officer arrested and executed.

== Polish Operation of the NKVD ==
1937–1938 mass execution and imprisonment of ethnic Poles in the USSR.

- Saul Amsterdam – Polish-born Communist activist; arrested and executed during the operation.
- Stanisław Bobiński – Polish Bolshevik and Red Army officer; purged in the Polish Operation.
- Kazimierz Cichowski – Polish-Soviet politician; arrested and executed during the operation.
- Julian Leszczyński – Polish Communist leader; purged during the NKVD campaign.
- Józef Unszlicht – Polish-born Soviet official; executed during the Polish Operation.

== Documents and orders ==
- NKVD Order No. 00439 – Order targeting German nationals for arrest.
- NKVD Order No. 00447 – Main directive for mass operations against “anti-Soviet elements.”
- Decree about Arrests, Prosecutor Supervision and Course of Investigation – 1934 law expanding NKVD powers over investigations and arrests.
- Stalin's shooting lists – Direct orders for executions, signed by Stalin and others
- Darkness at Noon – Novel based on Bukharin’s trial and Stalinist purges.
- NKVD Order No. 00485 – Secret directive initiating the Polish Operation of the NKVD.

== People ==
=== Perpetrators ===
Major figures involved in the Great Purge, including NKVD officials

- Joseph Stalin – Soviet leader who directed the Great Purge.
- Genrikh Yagoda – NKVD chief before Yezhov; executed after show trial.
- Nikolai Yezhov – Head of the NKVD during the height of the Purge; executed in 1940.
- Lavrentiy Beria – Succeeded Yezhov; continued purges and oversaw later repression.
- Vyacheslav Molotov – Foreign Minister and Stalin's deputy who signed execution orders.
- Vasily Blokhin – NKVD executioner responsible for thousands of shootings.
- Lazar Kaganovich – Stalin loyalist who helped implement Purge policies.
- Kliment Voroshilov – Marshal of the Soviet Union and Stalin loyalist who endorsed military purges.

Other key NKVD officials and collaborators:

- Andrey Andreyevich Andreyev – Politburo member and organizer of repressive quotas.
- Mir Jafar Baghirov – Azerbaijani Communist leader; oversaw purges in the Caucasus.
- Lazar Berenzon – NKVD financial officer managing execution logistics.
- Matvei Berman – Head of the GULAG system; purged and executed.
- Boris Berman (chekist) – NKVD official involved in Belarusian purges; executed.
- Khorloogiin Choibalsan – Mongolian leader who mirrored Stalinist purges in Mongolia.
- Vladimir Dekanozov – NKVD official; executed in 1953 for political crimes.
- Semyon Dukelsky – NKVD official involved in cultural and political repression.
- Robert Eikhe – Central Committee member; executed in the 1939 purge.
- Mikhail Frinovsky – Deputy NKVD chief under Yezhov; executed in 1940 for conspiracy.
- Mark Gai – NKVD interrogator; executed during internal purges.
- Filipp Goloshchyokin – Soviet official involved in the Kazakh famine; executed.
- Mikhail Kalinin – Soviet head of state who signed off on execution lists.
- Nikolai Kashirin – Military commander complicit in purges; later executed.
- Bogdan Kobulov – NKVD officer and Beria ally; executed in 1953.
- Lazar Kogan – GULAG administrator; executed in 1939.
- Aleksandr Mikhaylovich Korotkov – NKVD officer active in espionage and repression.
- Dorjjavyn Luvsansharav – Mongolian official; helped carry out Stalinist purges in Mongolia.
- Genrikh Lyushkov – NKVD officer; defected to Japan in 1938, likely executed.
- Mikhail Rodionovich Matveyev – NKVD executioner active during mass shootings.
- Lev Mekhlis – Political commissar and press censor aligned with Purge efforts.
- Vsevolod Merkulov – NKGB chief under Beria; executed in 1953.
- Erich Mielke – German Communist and future Stasi head, involved in 1930s Soviet arrests.
- Anastas Mikoyan – Senior Soviet official who supported Purge decisions.
- Iosif Vareikis – Party leader in the Far East; arrested and executed.
- Karl Pauker – NKVD officer and Stalin's bodyguard; arrested and executed in 1937.
- Israel Pliner – GULAG official; purged and executed.
- Stanislav Redens – NKVD officer and relative of Stalin’s wife; executed.
- Boris Rodos – NKVD interrogator notorious for torture; executed in 1956.
- Ivan Serov – NKVD official involved in later stages of repression.
- Efim Shchadenko – Military commissar complicit in Red Army purges.
- Lev Sheinin – NKVD interrogator and prosecutor during major show trials.
- Matvei Shkiryatov – Party control commission official who enforced ideological purges.
- Lev Shvartzman – NKVD interrogator known for brutality; executed in 1955.
- Andrey Vyshinsky – Chief prosecutor in show trials, known for vicious rhetoric.
- Viktor Yartsev – NKVD official involved in internal purges; executed in 1938.
- Yakov Yakovlev – Soviet official and press censor; executed in 1938.
- Yefim Yevdokimov – NKVD official; arrested and shot in 1939.
- Zinovy Ushakov – Military officer tried in the Tukhachevsky case; executed in 1937.
- Aleksandr Uspensky – NKVD official; purged and executed.
- Vasiliy Ulrikh – Chief judge who sentenced thousands to death during show trials.
- Lev Vlodzimirsky – Interrogator and senior NKVD official; executed in 1954.
- Andrei Zhdanov – Stalinist ideologue who helped justify and expand purges.

=== Victims ===
See also the operations and trials sections for specific groups.

- Old Bolsheviks
- Red Army
- Left Column (theater troupe) – Target of cultural repression during the Great Purge
- Leon Trotsky – Exiled rival of Stalin, later assassinated in 1940.
- Armenian victims of the Great Purge
- Category:Great Purge victims

=== Other ===
- Sergei Kirov – Popular Bolshevik leader and Stalin’s potential rival; his 1934 murder triggered the Purge.
- Leonid Nikolaev – The assassin who shot Kirov.
- Ivan Zaporozhets – NKVD officer suspected of involvement.
- Vasiliy Ulrikh – Judge who oversaw the secret trial of Nikolaev.

== Locations ==
- Benois House – Building where Kirov’s assassin encountered him.
- Smolny Institute – Kirov’s office where he was assassinated.

=== Execution and burial sites ===
- Krasny Bor Forest, Karelia – Mass execution site during the Great Purge
- Sandarmokh – Major mass grave site for victims of the Purge
- Serpantinka – Secret execution site used by the NKVD

== Political conspiracies and propaganda ==
- Hitler Youth conspiracy – Alleged plot used as a pretext for repression
- Korets–Landau leaflet – Anti-Soviet leaflet tied to political repression
- Kremlin Plot – Fictitious conspiracy used to justify arrests and purges

== Repression-related institutions and bodies ==
- Hotel Lux – Exile residence for foreign communists, many of whom were purged
- Military Collegium of the Supreme Court of the Soviet Union – Judicial body that carried out mass sentencing during the Purge
- Leningrad City Committee of the Communist Party of the Soviet Union – Kirov’s party leadership body.

== Lists ==
- List of Soviet repressions of Azerbaijani military officers (1920–1938)
- Death dates of victims of the Great Purge
- Armenian victims of the Great Purge

== Years ==
- 1934 in the Soviet Union – Year of Sergei Kirov's assassination, marking the Purge's beginning
- 1935 in the Soviet Union
- 1936 in the Soviet Union
- 1937 in the Soviet Union
- 1938 in the Soviet Union
- 1939 in the Soviet Union – Year the Great Purge formally ended, though repression continued
- 1940 in the Soviet Union – Year of Leon Trotsky's assassination, marking the end of the Purge's immediate impact

== Related events ==
- Red Terror (Russia) – Earlier period of political repression in revolutionary Russia, 1918–1922
- Outline of the Red Terror (Russia)

== Related topics ==
- Pospelov Commission – 1955 commission that re‑examined Kirov’s murder.

== See also ==
- Bibliography of Stalinism and the Soviet Union
  - Stalin: Waiting for Hitler, 1929-1941 by Stephen Kotkin
  - The Road to Terror: Stalin and the Self-Destruction of the Bolsheviks, 1932—1939 by J. Arch Getty and Oleg V. Naumov
  - The Great Terror: A Reassessment by Robert Conquest
- List of massacres in Russia
