= Excess mortality under Joseph Stalin =

Academic views on death rates in Stalin-era USSR

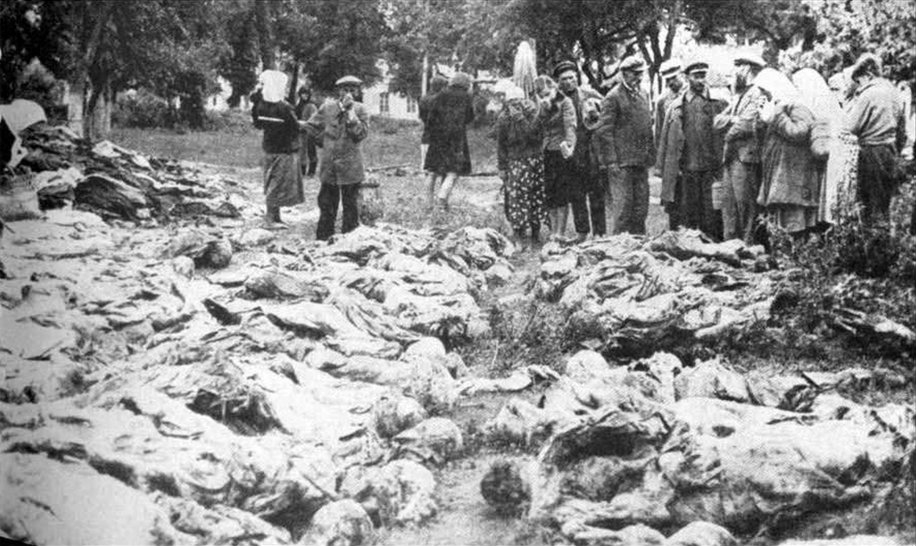
Exhumed mass grave of the Vinnytsia massacre

Estimates of the number of deaths attributable to the Soviet revolutionary and dictator Joseph Stalin vary widely. The scholarly consensus affirms that archival materials declassified in 1991 contain irrefutable data far superior to sources used prior to 1991, such as statements from emigres and other informants.

Before the dissolution of the Soviet Union and the archival revelations, some historians estimated that the numbers killed by Stalin's regime were 20 million or higher. After the Soviet Union dissolved, evidence from the Soviet archives was declassified and researchers were allowed to study it. This contained official records of 799,455 executions (1921–1953), around 1.5 to 1.7 million deaths in the Gulag, some 390,000 deaths during the dekulakization forced resettlement, and up to 400,000 deaths of persons deported during the 1940s, with a total of about 3.3 million officially recorded victims in these categories. According to historian Stephen Wheatcroft, approximately 1 million of these deaths were "purposive" while the rest happened through neglect and irresponsibility. The deaths of at least 5.5 to 6.5 million persons in the Soviet famine of 1932–1933 are sometimes included with the victims of the Stalin era.

== Events ==
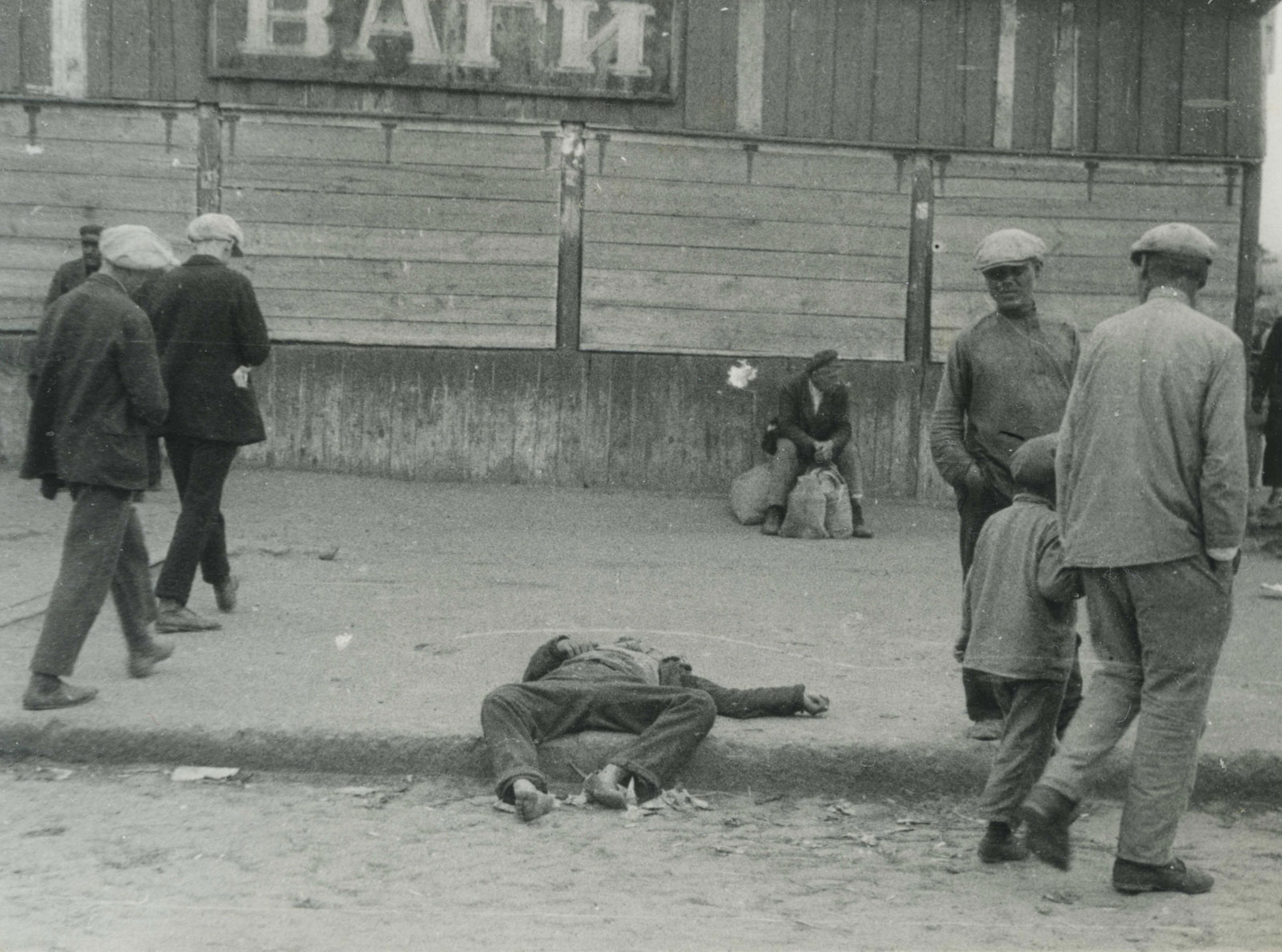
Passers-by and the corpse of a starved man on a street in Kharkiv, 1932

=== Gulag ===
According to official Soviet estimates, more than 14 million people passed through the Gulag from 1929 to 1953, and a further 7 to 8 million were deported and exiled to remote areas of the Soviet Union.

According to a 1993 study of recently declassified archival Soviet data, a total of 1,053,829 people died in the Gulag (not including labor colonies) from 1934 to 1953 (there was no archival data for the period 1919–1934). More recent archival figures for the deaths in the Gulag, labor colonies and prisons combined for 1931–1953 were 1.713 million. According to historian Michael Ellman, non-state estimates of the actual Gulag death toll are usually higher because historians such as Robert Conquest took into account the likelihood of unreliable record keeping. According to author Anne Applebaum, it was common practice to release prisoners who were either suffering from incurable diseases or near death.

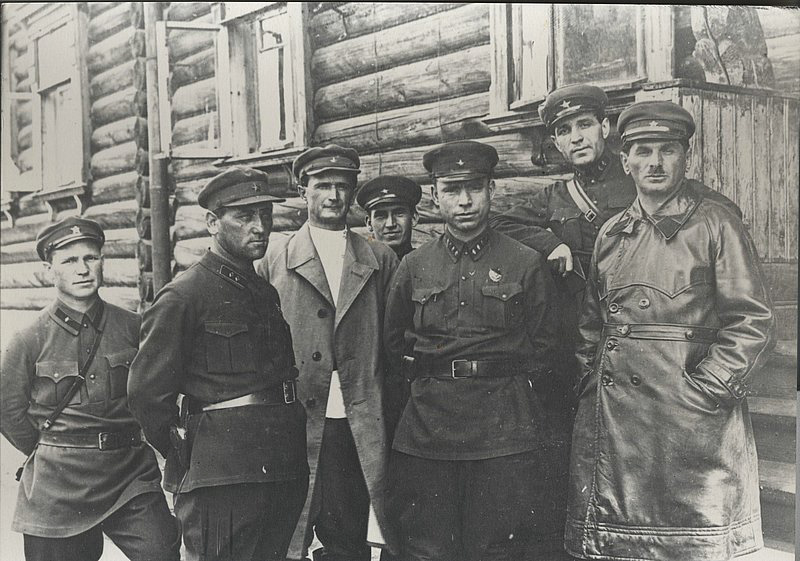
OGPU chiefs responsible for construction of the White Sea–Baltic Canal were Naftaly Frenkel (far right) and Matvei Berman (front, second from right), also head of the Gulag from 1932 to 1939

Golfo Alexopoulos, history professor at the University of South Florida, believes that at least six million people died as a result of their detention in the gulags. This estimate is disputed by other scholars, with critics such as J. Hardy stating that the evidence Alexopoulos used is indirect and misinterpreted. Historian Dan Healey argues that the estimate has obvious methodological difficulties.

Citing materials pre-1991, author John G. Heidenrich estimates the number of deaths at 12 million. His book is not primarily about estimating deaths from repressive policies in the Soviet Union, and he appears to have relied on Aleksandr Solzhenitsyn's political and literary work The Gulag Archipelago, which historian Stephen G. Wheatcroft explains was not intended as a historical fact but as a challenge to Soviet authorities after their years of secrecy.

According to estimates based on data from Soviet archives post-1991, there were around 1.6 million deaths during the whole period from 1929 to 1953. The tentative historical consensus is that of the 18 million people who passed through the gulag system from 1930 to 1953, between 1.5 and 1.7 million died as a result of their incarceration.

=== Soviet famine of 1932–1933 ===
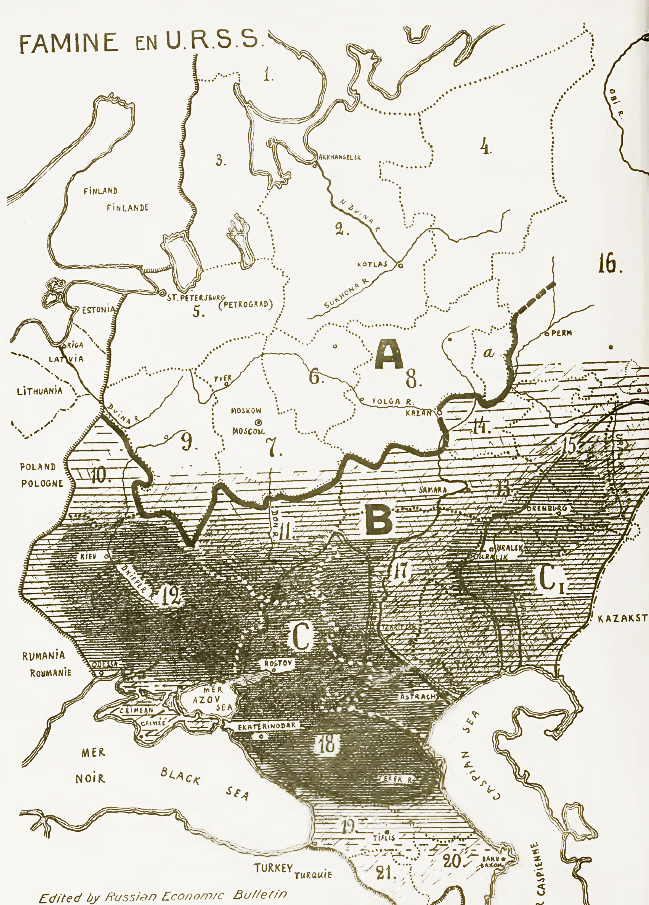
Soviet famine of 1932–1933, with areas where the effects of famine were most severe shaded

The deaths of 5.7 to perhaps 7.0 million people in the Soviet famine of 1932–1933 and Soviet collectivization of agriculture are included among the victims of repression during the period of Stalin by some historians. This categorization is controversial, as historians differ as to whether the famine in Ukraine was created as a deliberate part of the campaign of repression against kulaks and others, was an unintended consequence of the struggle over forced collectivization, or was primarily a result of natural factors.

=== Judicial executions ===
According to official figures there were 777,975 judicial executions for political charges from 1929 to 1953, including 681,692 in 1937–1938, the years of the Great Purge. Unofficial estimates estimate a total number of Stalinism repression deaths in 1937–38 at 700,000–1,200,000. There were also operations of mass ethnic cleansing against various minorities living in Stalin's USSR, known as the National operations of the NKVD, with the largest one being the Polish Operation of the NKVD during which 150,000 Poles were arrested, of whom over 111,000 were exterminated. Under Stalin, the death penalty was extended to adolescents as young as 12 years old in 1935.

=== Soviet famine of 1946–1947 ===
The last major famine to hit the Soviet Union began in July 1946, reached its peak in February–August 1947 and then quickly diminished in intensity, although there were still some famine deaths in 1948. Economist Michael Ellman states that the hands of the state could have fed all those who died of starvation. He argues that had the policies of the Soviet regime been different, there might have been no famine at all or a much smaller one. Ellman claims that the famine resulted in an estimated 1 to 1.5 million lives lost in addition to secondary population losses due to reduced fertility.

=== Population transfer by the Soviet Union ===
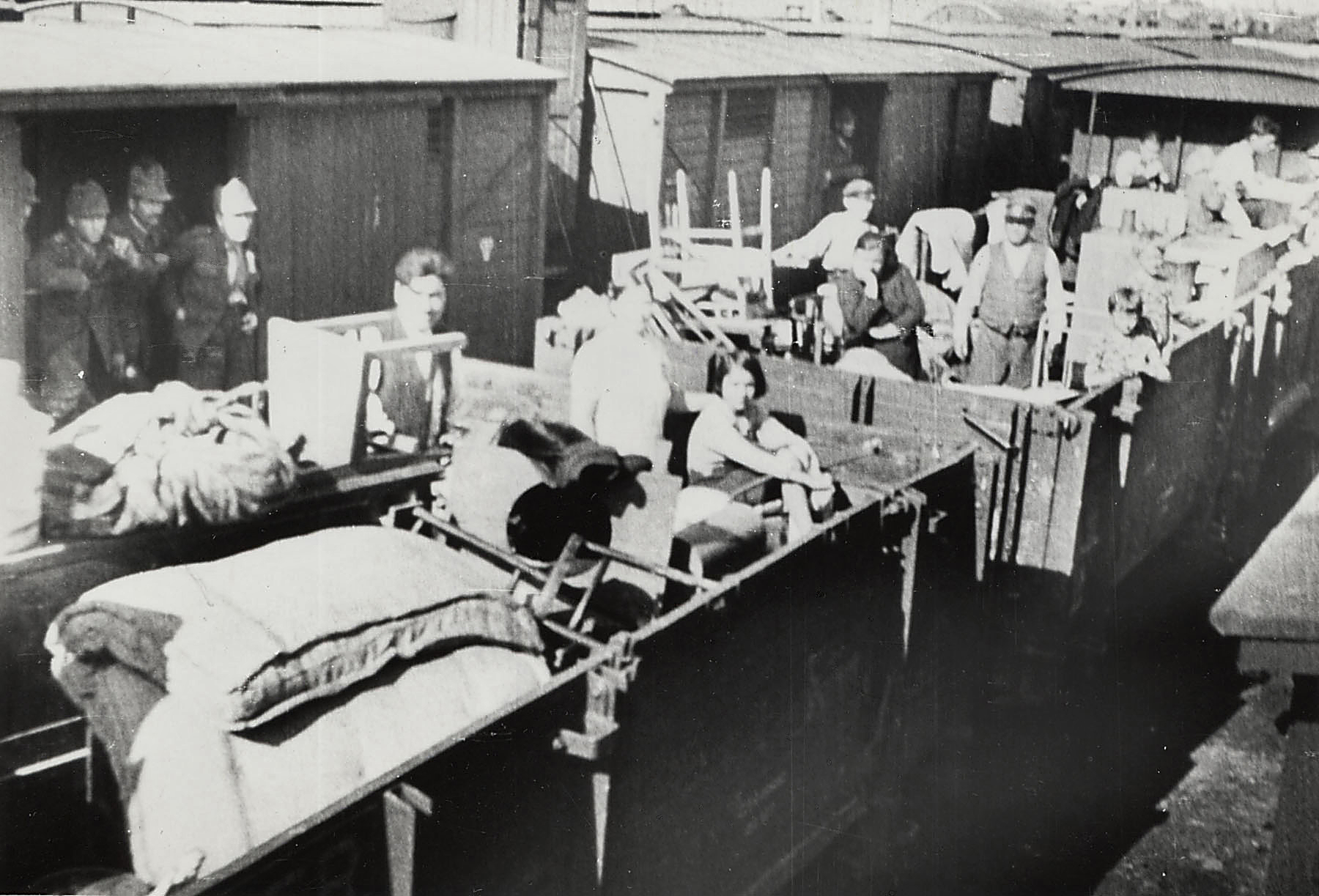
Romanian refugees after the 1940 Soviet occupation of Bessarabia and northern Bukovina

==== Deportation of kulaks ====
Large numbers of kulaks regardless of their nationality were resettled to Siberia and Central Asia. According to data from Soviet archives, which were published in 1990, 1,803,392 people were sent to labor colonies and camps in 1930 and 1931, and 1,317,022 reached the destination. Deportations on a smaller scale continued after 1931. Data from the Soviet archives indicates 2.4 million kulaks were deported from 1930 to 1934. The reported number of kulaks and their relatives who had died in labour colonies from 1932 to 1940 was 389,521. Popular history author Simon Sebag Montefiore estimated that 15 million kulaks and their families were deported by 1937; during the deportation, many people died, but the full number is not known.

==== Forced settlements in the Soviet Union of 1939–1953 ====
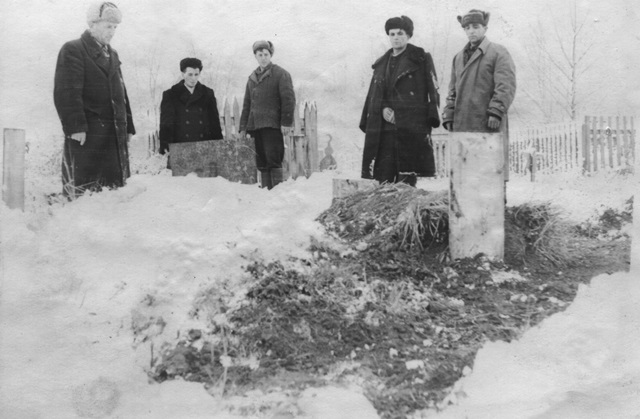
Funeral of the deported Crimean Tatars in Krasnovishersk, late 1944

According to Russian historian Pavel Polian, 5.870 million persons were deported to forced settlements from 1920 to 1952, including 3.125 million from 1939 to 1952. Those ethnic minorities considered a threat to Soviet security in 1939–52 were forcibly deported to Special Settlements run by the NKVD. Poles, Ukrainians from western regions, Soviet Germans, Balts, and Estonians peoples from the Caucasus and Crimea were the primary victims of this policy. Data from the Soviet archives list 309,521 deaths in the Special Settlements from 1941 to 1948 and 73,454 in 1949–50. According to Polian these people were not allowed to return to their home regions until after the death of Stalin, the exception being Soviet Germans who were not allowed to return to the Volga region of the Soviet Union. According to Soviet archives, the heaviest mortality rate was documented in people from the Northern Caucasus (the Chechens, Ingush) with 144,704 deaths, or 24.7% of the entire deported population, as well as 44,125 deaths from Crimea, or a 19.3% mortality rate.

=== Katyn massacre ===
The massacre was prompted by NKVD chief Lavrentiy Beria's proposal to execute all captive members of the Polish officer corps, dated 5 March 1940, approved by the Politburo of the Communist Party of the Soviet Union, including its leader Joseph Stalin. The number of victims is estimated at 22,000.

== Total number of victims ==
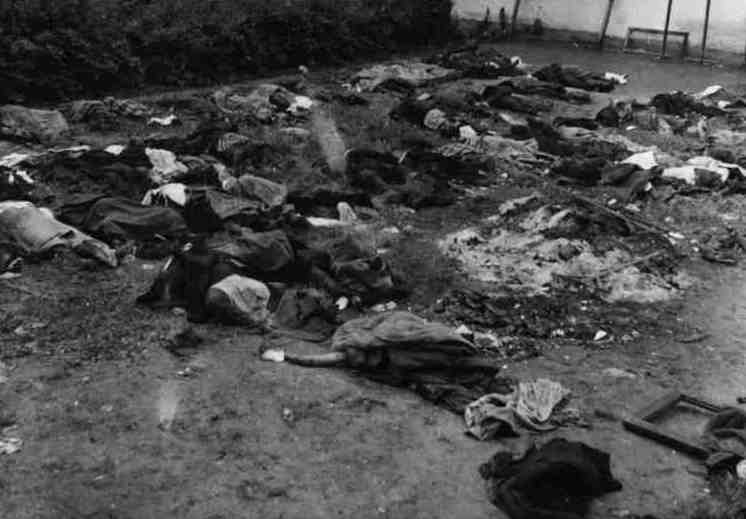
Victims of NKVD prisoner massacres in Lviv

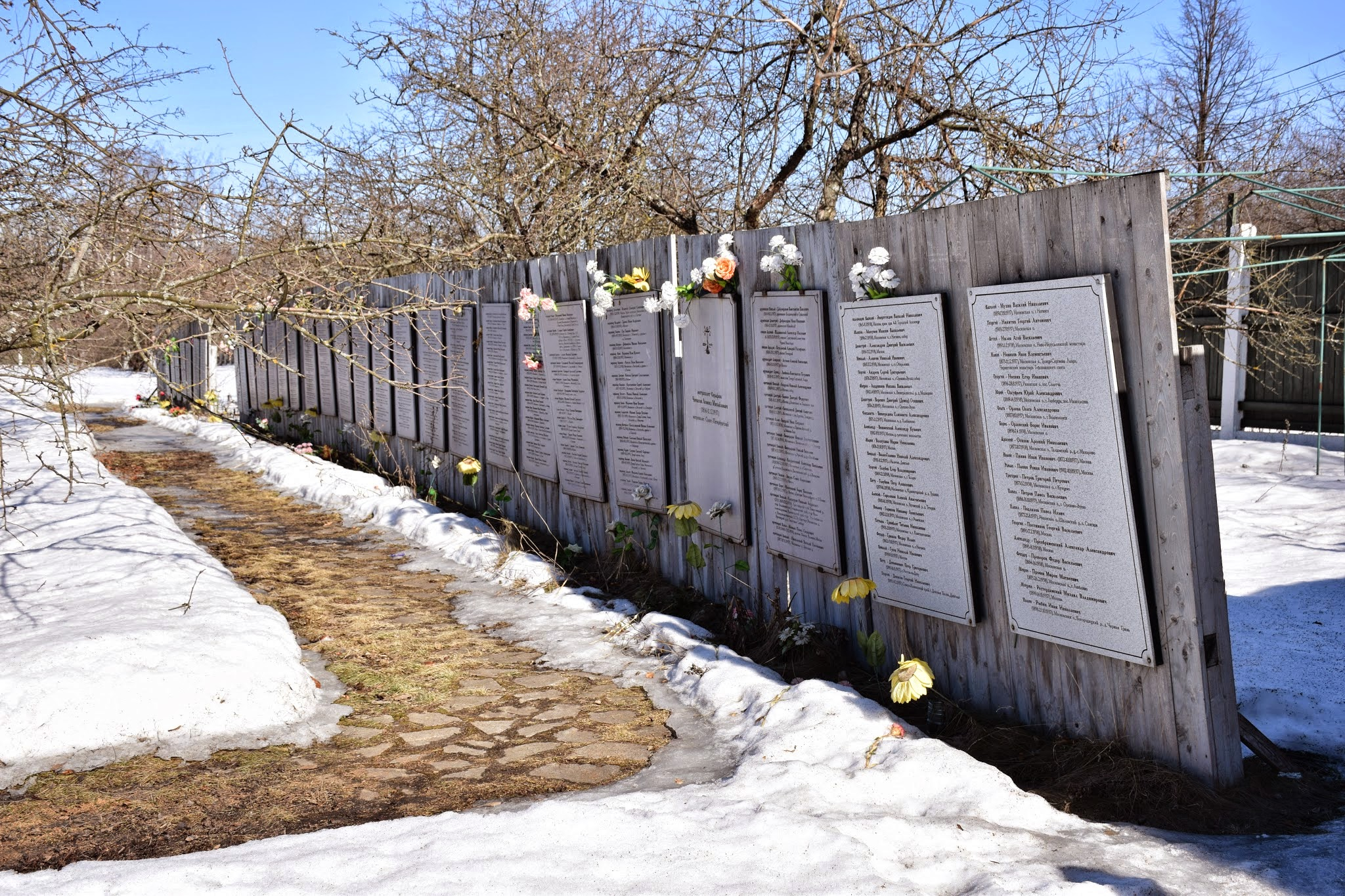
The memorial wall with the names of Stalin's victims, at the Butovo firing range outside Moscow

=== Census data ===
Writing in Slavic Review, demographers Barbara Anderson and Brian Silver maintained that limited census data make a precise death count impossible. Instead, they offer a probable range of 3.2 to 5.5 million excess deaths for the entire Soviet Union from 1926 to 1939, a period that covers collectivization, the civil war in the countryside, the purges of the late 1930s and major epidemics of typhus and malaria. In 2001, American historian Richard Pipes argued that the population had decreased by 9 to 10 million people from the 1932 to 1939 censuses. The 17th Congress of the UCP estimated that the USSRs population was 168 million in 1933, and predicted that it would grow to 180 million by 1937, yet the 1937 census registered only 162 million people, a decrease in population. The mortality rate was double the average one than in Europe at that time.

=== Modern estimates ===
Some historians claim that the death toll was around 20 million, a figure based on Conquest's book The Great Terror (1968), with some estimates relying in part on demographic losses such as Conquest's. In 2003, British historian Simon Sebag Montefiore suggested that Stalin was ultimately responsible for the deaths of at least 20 million people. In 2006, political scientist Rudolph Rummel wrote that the earlier higher victim total estimates are correct, although he included those killed by the government of the Soviet Union in other Eastern European countries as well. In his most recent edition of The Great Terror (2007), Conquest stated that while exact numbers may never be known with complete certainty, at least 15 million people were killed "by the whole range of Soviet regime's terrors." According to Barbara Anderson and Brian Silver, historians such as Robert Conquest made the most primitive of errors. They asserted that these Cold Warriors overestimated fertility rates and underrated the impact of assimilation, through which many Ukrainians were redesignated as Russians in the 1939 census, confusing population deficits, which included unborn children, with excess deaths.

Historians such as J. Arch Getty, Stephen G. Wheatcroft, and others, insist that the opening of the Soviet archives has vindicated the lower estimates put forth by the revisionist school. In 2011, after assessing twenty years of historical research in Eastern European archives, American historian Timothy D. Snyder stated that Stalin deliberately killed about 6 million, which rise to 9 million if foreseeable deaths arising from policies are taken into account. American historian William D. Rubinstein concluded that, even under most conservative estimates, Stalin was responsible for the deaths of at least 7 million people, or about 4.2% of USSRs total population—meaning 1 in 24 Soviet citizens.

Some historians believe that the official archival figures of the categories that were recorded by Soviet authorities are unreliable and incomplete. In addition to failures regarding comprehensive recordings, as one additional example, Canadian historian Robert Gellately and Montefiore argue that the many suspects beaten and tortured to death while in "investigative custody" were likely not to have been counted amongst the executed. Conversely, Wheatcroft states that prior to the opening of the archives for historical research, "our understanding of the scale and the nature of Soviet repression has been extremely poor" and that some specialists who wish to maintain earlier high estimates of the Stalinist death toll are "finding it difficult to adapt to the new circumstances when the archives are open and when there are plenty of irrefutable data" and instead "hang on to their old Sovietological methods with round-about calculations based on odd statements from emigres and other informants who are supposed to have superior knowledge." British historian Michael Ellman argues that mass deaths from famines should be placed in a different category than the repression victims, mentioning that throughout Russian history famines and droughts have been a common occurrence, including the Russian famine of 1921–1922, triggered by Stalin's predecessor Vladimir Lenin's war communism policies, which killed about five million people. He also states that famines were widespread throughout the world in the 19th and 20th centuries in countries such as China, India, Ireland, and Russia. Ellman compared the behaviour of the Stalinist regime vis-à-vis the Holodomor to that of the British government (towards Ireland and India) and the G8 in contemporary times. According to Ellman, the G8 "are guilty of mass manslaughter or mass deaths from criminal negligence because of their not taking obvious measures to reduce mass deaths" and Stalin's "behaviour was no worse than that of many rulers in the nineteenth and twentieth centuries." Ben Kiernan, an American academic and historian, described Stalin's era as "by far the bloodiest of Soviet or even Russian history".

Numbers of deaths caused by Stalinism, 1924–1953 (excluding killings outside of Soviet borders)
Event	Est. number of deaths	References
Dekulakization	530,000–600,000	
Great Purge	700,000–1,200,000	
Gulag	1,500,000–1,713,000	
Soviet deportations	450,000–566,000	
Katyn massacre	22,000	
Holodomor	2,500,000–4,000,000	
Kazakh famine of 1931–33	1,450,000	

== Genocide allegations ==
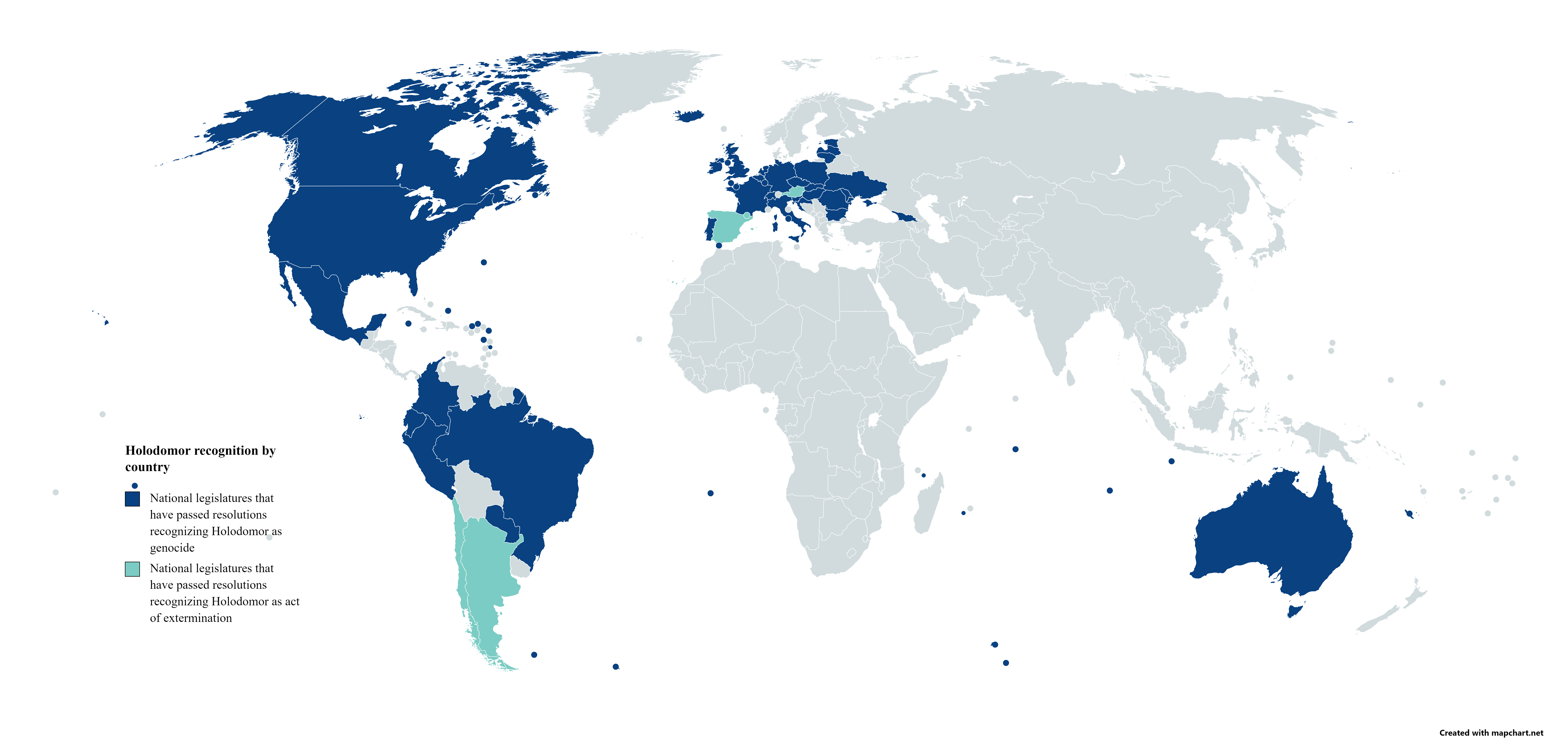
Recognition of the Holodomor by country

Stalin has been accused of genocide in the cases of forced population transfer in the Soviet Union. Raphael Lemkin, a lawyer of Polish-Jewish descent who initiated the Genocide Convention and coined the term genocide himself, assumed that genocide was perpetrated in the context of the mass deportation of the Chechens, Ingush, Volga Germans, Crimean Tatars, Kalmyks and Karachay. Some academics disagree with the classification of deportation as genocide. Professor Alexander Statiev argues that Stalin's administration did not have a conscious genocidal intent to exterminate the various deported peoples, but that Soviet "political culture, poor planning, haste, and wartime shortages were responsible for the genocidal death rate among them." He rather considers these deportations an example of Soviet assimilation of "unwanted nations." According to Professor Amir Weiner, "...It was their territorial identity and not their physical existence or even their distinct ethnic identity that the regime sought to eradicate." According to Professor Francine Hirsch, "although the Soviet regime practiced politics of discrimination and exclusion, it did not practice what contemporaries thought of as racial politics." To her, these mass deportations were based on the concept that nationalities were "sociohistorical groups with a shared consciousness and not racial-biological groups." In contrast to this view, Jon K. Chang contends that the deportations had been in fact based on ethnicity and that "social historians" in the West have failed to champion the rights of marginalised ethnicities in the Soviet Union.

Contemporary historians classify these deportations as a crime against humanity and ethnic persecution. Two of these cases of mass deportation with the highest mortality rates, the deportation of the Crimean Tatars and the deportation of the Chechens and Ingush, were recognized as genocides by Ukraine (plus 3 other countries) and the European Parliament respectively. On 26 April 1991 the Supreme Soviet of the Russian Socialist Federal Soviet Republic, under its chairman Boris Yeltsin, passed the law On the Rehabilitation of Repressed Peoples with Article 2 denouncing all mass deportations as "Stalin's policy of defamation and genocide."

Historians continue to debate whether or not the 1932–33 Ukrainian famine, known in Ukraine as the Holodomor, should be called a genocide. Twenty six countries officially recognise it under the legal definition of genocide. In 2006, the Ukrainian Parliament declared it to be such, and in 2010 a Ukrainian court posthumously convicted Stalin, Lazar Kaganovich, Stanislav Kosior, and other Soviet leaders of genocide. Popular among some Ukrainian nationalists is the idea that Stalin consciously organised the famine to suppress national desires among the Ukrainian people. This interpretation has been disputed by more recent historical studies. These have articulated the view that while Stalin's policies contributed significantly to the high mortality rate, there is no evidence that Stalin or the Soviet government consciously engineered the famine. The idea that this was a targeted attack on the Ukrainians is complicated by the widespread suffering that also affected other Soviet peoples in the famine, including the Russians. Within Ukraine, ethnic Poles and Bulgarians died in similar proportions to ethnic Ukrainians. Despite any lack of clear intent on Stalin's part, the historian Norman Naimark noted that although there may not be sufficient "evidence to convict him in an international court of justice as a genocidaire [...] that does not mean that the event itself cannot be judged as genocide."

== See also ==
- Bibliography of the Holodomor
- Day of Remembrance of the Victims of Political Repressions
- Mass killings under communist regimes
- Political repression in the Soviet Union
- World War II casualties of the Soviet Union
- Outline of the Great Purge (Soviet Union)
- Timeline of the Great Purge
