= The Road to Terror =

History of the Soviet Union, 1932–1939

The Road to Terror: Stalin and the Self-Destruction of the Bolsheviks, 1932-1939
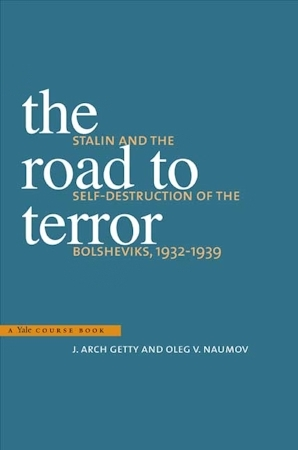
- Book Cover
- Author: J. Arch Getty, Oleg V. Naumov
- Language: English
- Series: Annals of Communism Series
- Subject: History of the Soviet Union
- Genre: Non-fiction, history
- Publisher: Yale University Press
- Publication date: 1999(first edition), 2010 (updated and abridged edition)
- Publication place: United States
- Pages: 634pp (original edition) 320pp (abridged edition)
- ISBN: 978-0300104073
- Website: Yale Press

The Road to Terror: Stalin and the Self-Destruction of the Bolsheviks, 1932—1939 is a political history of the Soviet Union from 1932—1939 written by John Archibald Getty III (Note: J. Arch Getty is an American historian and professor at the University of California, Los Angeles, specializing in the history of Russia and the Soviet Union.) and Oleg V. Naumov. Originally published by Yale University Press in 1999, it was reissued as an updated and abridged version in 2010 and is part of the Annals of Communism series.

== Reviews ==
- Altrichter, H. (2000). Book Review: The Road to Terror: Stalin and the Self-Destruction of the Bolsheviks, 1932–1939. Jahrbücher Für Geschichte Osteuropas, 48(4), 615–616. JSTOR
- Bernstein, L. (2002). Book Review: The Road to Terror: Stalin and the Self-Destruction of the Bolsheviks, 1932–1939. International Labor and Working-Class History, 61, 205–207. JSTOR
- Brooks, J. (2001). Book Review: The Road to Terror: Stalin and the Self-Destruction of the Bolsheviks, 1932–1939. The Historian, 64(1), 183–184. JSTOR
- Halfin, I. (2001). Book Review: The Road to Terror: Stalin and the Self-Destruction of the Bolsheviks, 1932–1939. Slavic Review, 60(4), 859–861. JSTOR.
- Hanson, G. A. (1999). Book Review: The Road to Terror: Stalin and the Self-Destruction of the Bolsheviks, 1932–1939. Russian History, 26(1), 106–107. JSTOR
- Harris, J. (2003). Was Stalin a Weak Dictator? The Journal of Modern History, 75(2), 375–386. JSTOR
- Kinloch, N. (2000). Documenting Mass-Murder. Teaching History, 99, 62–63. JSTOR
- Moullec, G.-G. (2002). Book Review: The Road to Terror: Stalin and the Self-Destruction of the Bolsheviks, 1932–1939. Journal of Cold War Studies, 4(3), 160–161. JSTOR
- Nordlander, D. J. (2000). Book Review: The Road to Terror: Stalin and the Self-Destruction of the Bolsheviks, 1932–1939. Europe-Asia Studies, 52(4), 769–771. JSTOR
- Prozorov, S. (2013). Living Ideas and Dead Bodies: The Biopolitics of Stalinism. Alternatives: Global, Local, Political, 38(3), 208–227. JSTOR
- Rees, E. A. (2000). The Great Terror: Suicide or Murder? The Russian Review, 59(3), 446–450. JSTOR
- Schoenfeld, G. (2000). Book Review: The Road to Terror: Stalin and the Self-Destruction of the Bolsheviks, 1932–1939. Journal of Cold War Studies, 2(3), 143–145. JSTOR
- Ward, C. (2001). Book Review: The Road to Terror: Stalin and the Self-Destruction of the Bolsheviks, 1932–1939. The American Historical Review, 106(1), 291–291. JSTOR

== Publication history ==
- 1999 Original publication by Yale University Press (pp. 635)
- 2010 Updated and abridged version by Yale University press (pp. 320)

== See also ==
- Bibliography of Stalinism and the Soviet Union
- Stalin: Waiting for Hitler, 1929-1941
- Stalin: Breaker of Nations
- Outline of the Great Purge (Soviet Union)
- Timeline of the Great Purge
