= List of Soviet repressions of Azerbaijani military officers (1920–1938) =

After Red Army invasion of Azerbaijan began repressions of the Bolsheviks against the Azerbaijani military officers. The participation of Azerbaijani military officers in the Ganja revolt accelerated this process. The second wave began during Great Purge.

== List ==
| Rank | Name | Photo | Birth date | Birthplace | Death date | Death place |
|---|---|---|---|---|---|---|
| Political commissar | Jabir Aliyev | | 1902 | | 1938 | Baku, Azerbaijan SSR, USSR |
| Warrant officer | Heydar Vazirov | | 1893 | Babek District, Erivan Governorate, Russian Empire | 1937 | Baku, Azerbaijan SSR, USSR |
| Komdiv | Gambay Vazirov | | 1899 | Nakhchivan, Erivan Governorate, Russian Empire | 1937 | Baku, Azerbaijan SSR, USSR |
| Major general | Firudin bey Vazirov | | 1850 | Tiflis, Tiflis Governorate, Russian Empire | 30 June 1925 | Baku, Azerbaijan SSR, USSR |
| Colonel | Galib bey Vakilov | | 1888 | Kazakh Uyezd, Elisabethpol Governorate, Russian Empire | 1937 | Baku, Azerbaijan SSR, USSR |
| Major general | Abdulhamid bey Gaytabashi | | 10 July 1884 | Tiflis, Tiflis Governorate, Russian Empire | June 1920 | Bakı, Azerbaijan SSR |
| Colonel | Danyal bəy Həlləcov | | 1876 | Balakən, Zakatal Okrug, Russian Empire | June 1920 | Ganja, Azerbaijan SSR |
| Major general | Əliyar bəy Haşımbəyov | | 1856 | Baku, Baku Governorate, Russian Empire | 1920 | Nargin, Baku, Azerbaijan SSR |
| Major general | Davud bəy Yadigarov | | 1881 | Borchaly Uyezd, Tiflis Governorate, Russian Empire | 1920 | Unknown |
| Major general | Muhammad Mirza Qajar | | 1872 | Shusha, Shusha Uyezd, Elisabethpol Governorate, Russian Empire | 1920 | Ganja, Azerbaijan SSR |
| Colonel | Sadraddin Mirza Qajar | | 1866 | Shusha, Shusha Uyezd, Elisabethpol Governorate, Russian Empire | 1921 | Arkhangelsk, Russian Soviet Federative Socialist Republic |
| Major general | Feyzullah Mirza Qajar | | 15 December 1872 | Shusha, Shusha Uyezd, Elisabethpol Governorate, Russian Empire | 1920 | Boyuk Zira, Baku, Azerbaijan SSR |
| Major general | Amir Kazim Mirza Qajar | | 1853 | Shusha, Shusha Uyezd, Elisabethpol Governorate, Russian Empire | 1920 | Ganja, Azerbaijan SSR |
| Colonel | Bahram bey Nabibekov | | 1884 | Nukha Uyezd, Elisabethpol Governorate, Russian Empire | 1930 | Shaki, Azerbaijan SSR, USSR |
| General of the Cavalry, General-Adjutant | Huseyn Khan Nakhchivanski | | 28 July (9 August) 1863 | Nakhchivan City, Erivan Governorate, Russian Empire | January 1919 | St. Petersburg, Russian Soviet Federative Socialist Republic |
| Kombrig | Jamshid Nakhchivanski | | 23 August 1895 | Nakhchivan City, Erivan Governorate, Russian Empire | 26 August 1938 | Moscow, Russian Soviet Federative Socialist Republic, USSR |
| Political commissar | Huseyn Rahmanov | | 1902 | Baku, Baku Uyezd, Baku Governorate, Russian Empire | 1938 | Baku, Azerbaijan SSR, USSR |
| Major General | Habib Bey Salimov | | 8 February 1881 | Yerevan, Erivan Governorate, Russian Empire | 30 December 1920 | Baku, Azerbaijani SSR |
| Colonel | Mehdi bey Soltanov | | 1880 | Ganja, Elisabethpol Governorate, Russian Empire | 26 June 1937 | Baku, Azerbaijani SSR, USSR |
| Lieutenant General | Maciej Sulkiewicz | | 20 July 1865 | Kiemiejšy, Vilna Governorate, Russian Empire | 15 July 1920 | Baku, Azerbaijani SSR |
| Colonel | Murtuz Talıbzadə | | 1902 | Baku, Baku Uyezd, Baku Governorate, Russian Empire | 1937 | Baku, Azerbaijani SSR, USSR |
| Colonel | Murtuz Talıbzadə | | 1902 | Tiflis, Tiflis Governorate, Russian Empire | 1937-1943 | Novokuybyshevsk, Russian Soviet Federative Socialist Republic, USSR |
| Major General | Khalil bey Talıshkhanov | | 1859 | Tiflis, Tiflis Governorate, Russian Empire | 1920 | Baku, Azerbaijani SSR |
| Major General | Murad Giray bey Tlexas | | 15 August 1874 | Gatlukay, Kuban Oblast, Russian Empire | 29 May 1920 | Baku, Azerbaijani SSR |
| Major General | Ibrahim bey Usubov | | 6 March 1872 | Yukhary-Salakhly, Elisabethpol Governorate, Russian Empire | 16 Juna 1920 | Nargin, Baku, Azerbaijani SSR |
| Colonel | Rustam bey Shikhlinski | | 1878 | Salakhly, Elisabethpol Governorate, Russian Empire | 1920 | Ganja, Azerbaijani SSR |
