= Karchevan =

Karchevan Կարճևան
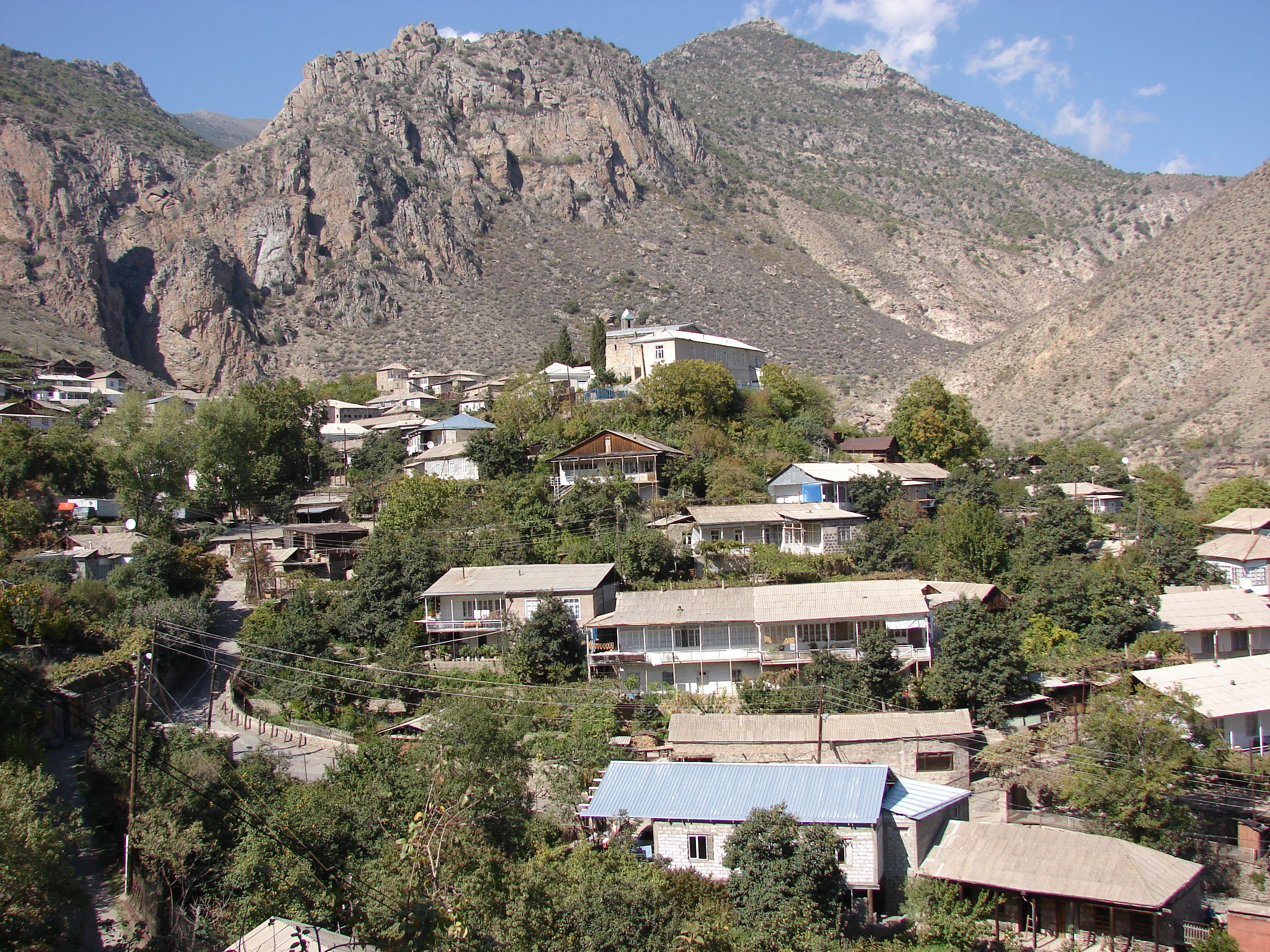

- Location within Armenia Location within Syunik Province
- Coordinates: 38°53′47″N 46°10′44″E
- Country: Armenia
- Province: Syunik
- Municipality: Meghri

Area
  - Total: 29.04 km^{2} (11.21 sq mi)

Population (2011)
  - Total: 301
  - Density: 10.4/km^{2} (26.8/sq mi)
- Time zone: UTC+4 (AMT)

Karchevan (Armenian: Կարճևան) is a village in the Meghri Municipality of the Syunik Province in Armenia.

The village is located in the southern part of the Syunik Province, a short distance from the Aras River - the main tributary of the Kura River, which forms the border with Iran and the Nakhchivan Autonomous Republic of Azerbaijan.

== Demographics ==
The Statistical Committee of Armenia reported its population was 292 in 2010, down from 353 at the 2001 census.

== History ==
The village of Karchevan was first mentioned in the 10th century AD. It was bought by Armenian king Smbat Bagratuni (890-914) and donated to the domain of the Tatev Monastery. Historically, it formed part of the Arevik gavar (district) of the Syunik region of Greater Armenia and was mentioned in sources as a significant settlement. 13th century tax records from Tatev mention the settlement in its domain. It was the location of the Karchevan fortress and a caravanserai. According to the Geographical and Statistical Dictionary of the Russian Empire, published in 1865, 260 people lived in the village at that time. In addition, there was an old Armenian church, and nearby the village was the monastery of Surb Stepanos. The settlement has the Surb Astvatsatsin Church (12th century) and the ruins of the monastery of Surb Stepanos. In the vicinity of the village are the ruins of the Karchevan fortress as well as old cemeteries and tombs. During the Russian Empire, Karchevan was part of the Nakhichevan uezd of the Erivan Governorate.

== Culture ==
The locals speak a special Karchevan dialect of the Eastern Armenian language, similar to that spoken in Meghri and formerly in Agulis.

== Notable people ==
- Vagarshak Ter-Vaganyan (1893–1936), Armenian Bolshevik politician, victim of the Great Purge

== Gallery ==
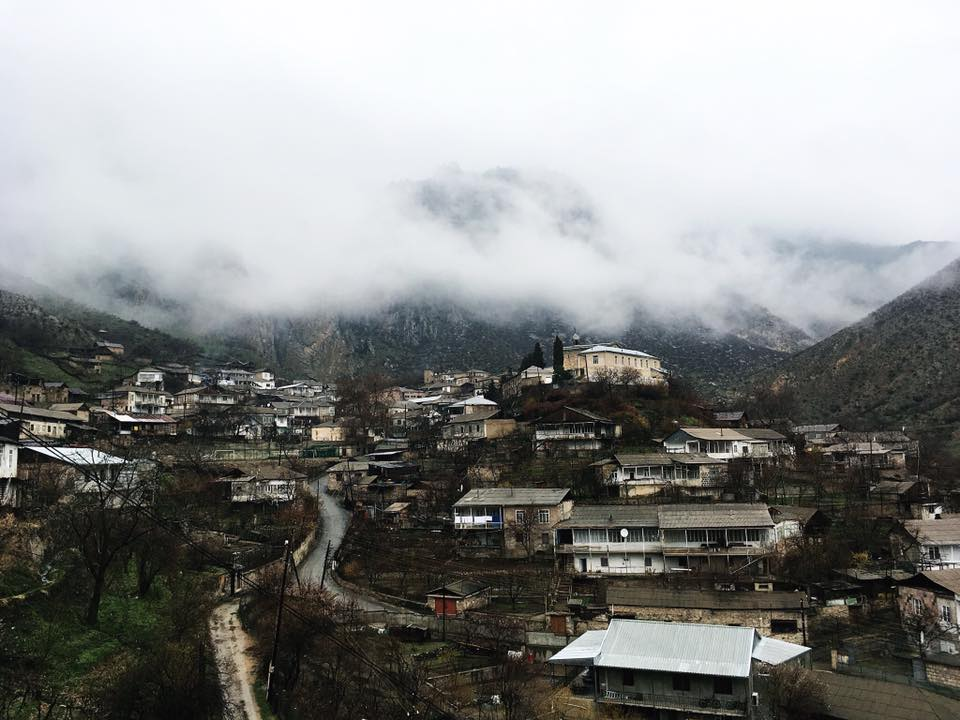
Karchevan

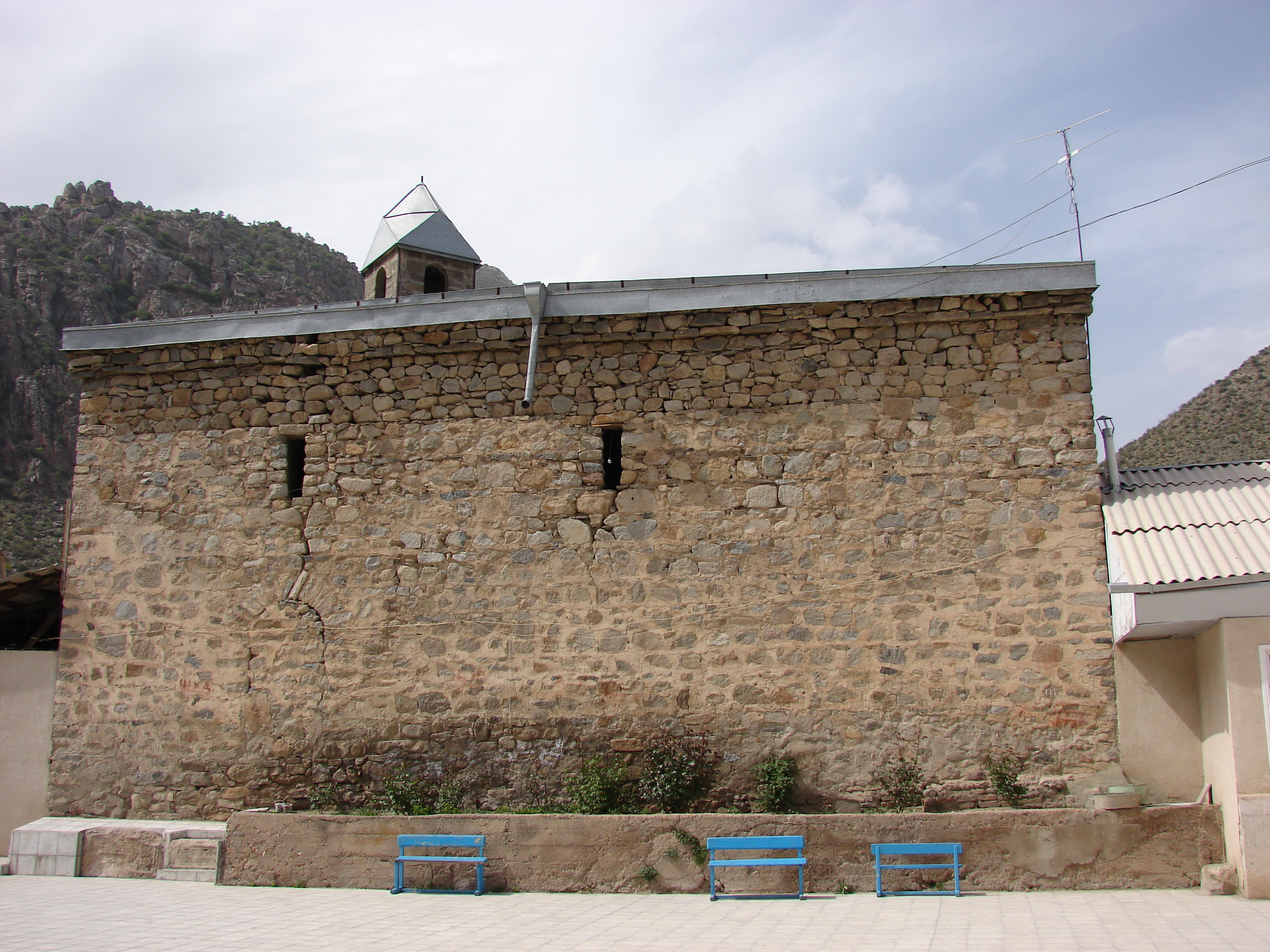
Surb Astvatsatsin Church

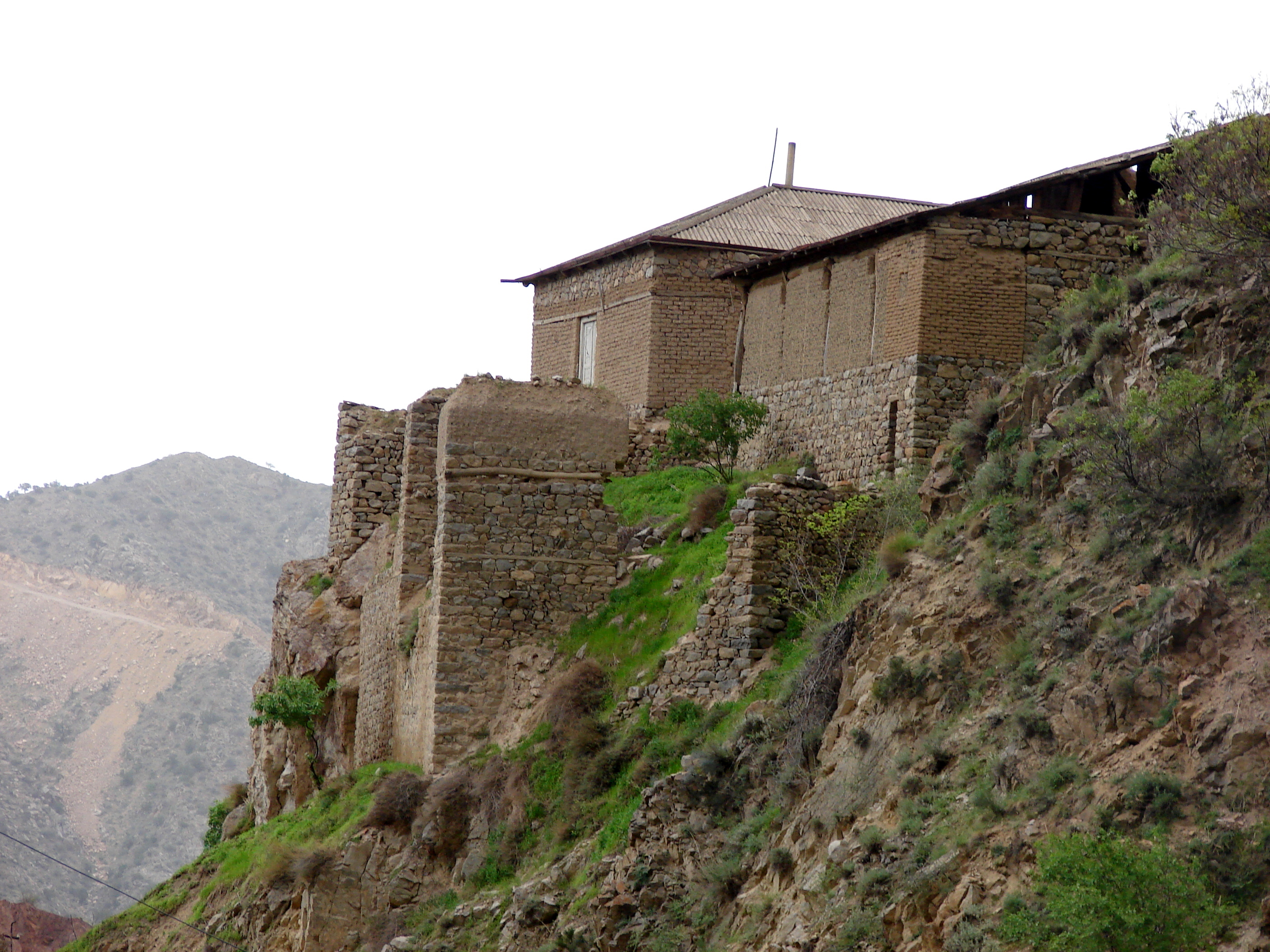
Linguist Eduard Aghayan's house in Karchevan

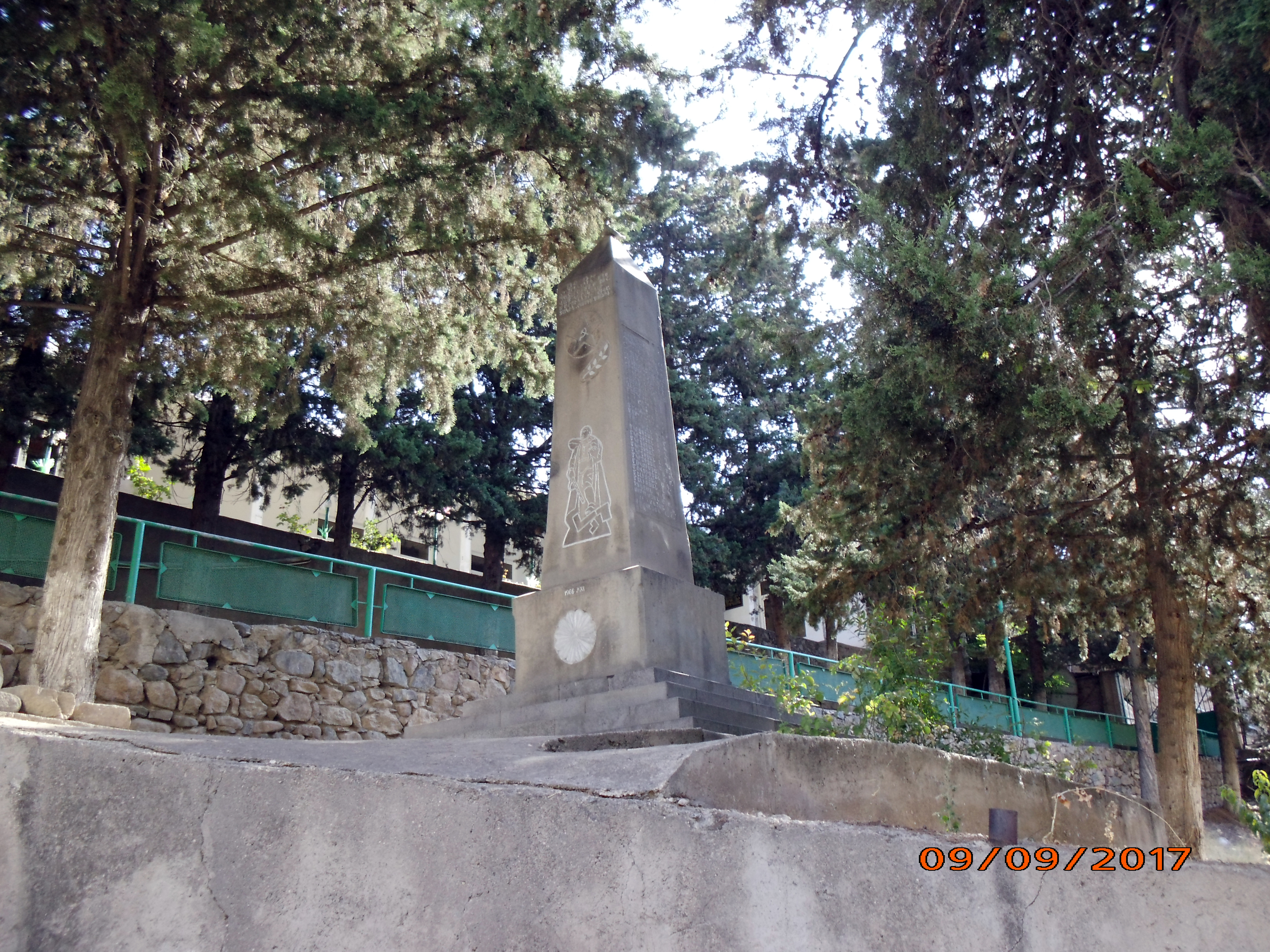
World War II memorial
