= Bahram bey Nabibekov =

Azerbaijani colonel (1884–1930)

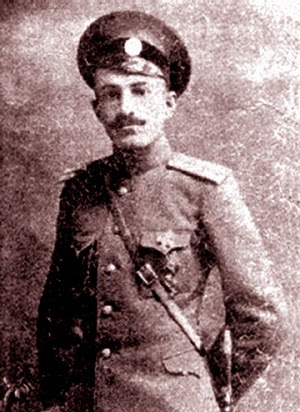
- Born: December 6, 1884; Sheki, Azerbaijan
- Died: July 1930; Sheki, Azerbaijan
- Military career
- Allegiance: Imperial Russia; Azerbaijan Democratic Republic
- Branch: Imperial Russian Army; Azerbaijan army
- Service years: 1905-1918
- Rank: Colonel
- Conflicts: World War I
- Awards: Order of Saint Stanislaus; Order of St. Anna

Bahram bey Nabibekov (Azerbaijani: Bəhram bəy Nəbibəyov, Russian: Бахрам-бек Набибеков; December 6, 1884 - July 1930) was an Azerbaijani colonel in the Azerbaijan Democratic Republic army and one of the leaders of Sheki uprising in 1930.

Bahram bey Nabibekov was born on 6 December 1884, in Sheki, Azerbaijan in a noble family. His father - Kasim bey - served as translator of oriental languages at the headquarters of General Kuropatkin in Turkestan. After receiving his education in Kutaisi real school, he entered the Constantine Artillery School in St. Petersburg. After graduating from Constantine Artillery School in September 1908, he was conferred the rank of podporuchik and assigned to the 20th Turkestan artillery brigade.

In 1911, he was poruchik, serving in 6th battery. In 1912, he was assistant-chief of the 2nd Caucasian artillery practice polygon. On 31 August 1912 Nabibekov was promoted to the rank of shtabs-kapitan. In the First World War he fought in the 20th artillery brigade at the Caucasian Front. He was decorated with the Order of Saint Stanislaus and the Order of St. Anna.

After the February Revolution in Russia, Nabibekov resigned and left for Baku. With the establishment of the Azerbaijan Democratic Republic in 1918, he entered the Azerbaijan Army. In December 1918 Captain Nabibekov was appointed commander of the 4th Mountain Battery. Then he commanded the 3rd Light Battery in the 2nd Artillery Brigade. In November 1919, he commanded mixed troops in Absheron near Shoulan-Turk guarding against a landing attempt by enemy troops. On 24 March 1920 Nabibekov was promoted to the rank of lieutenant colonel.

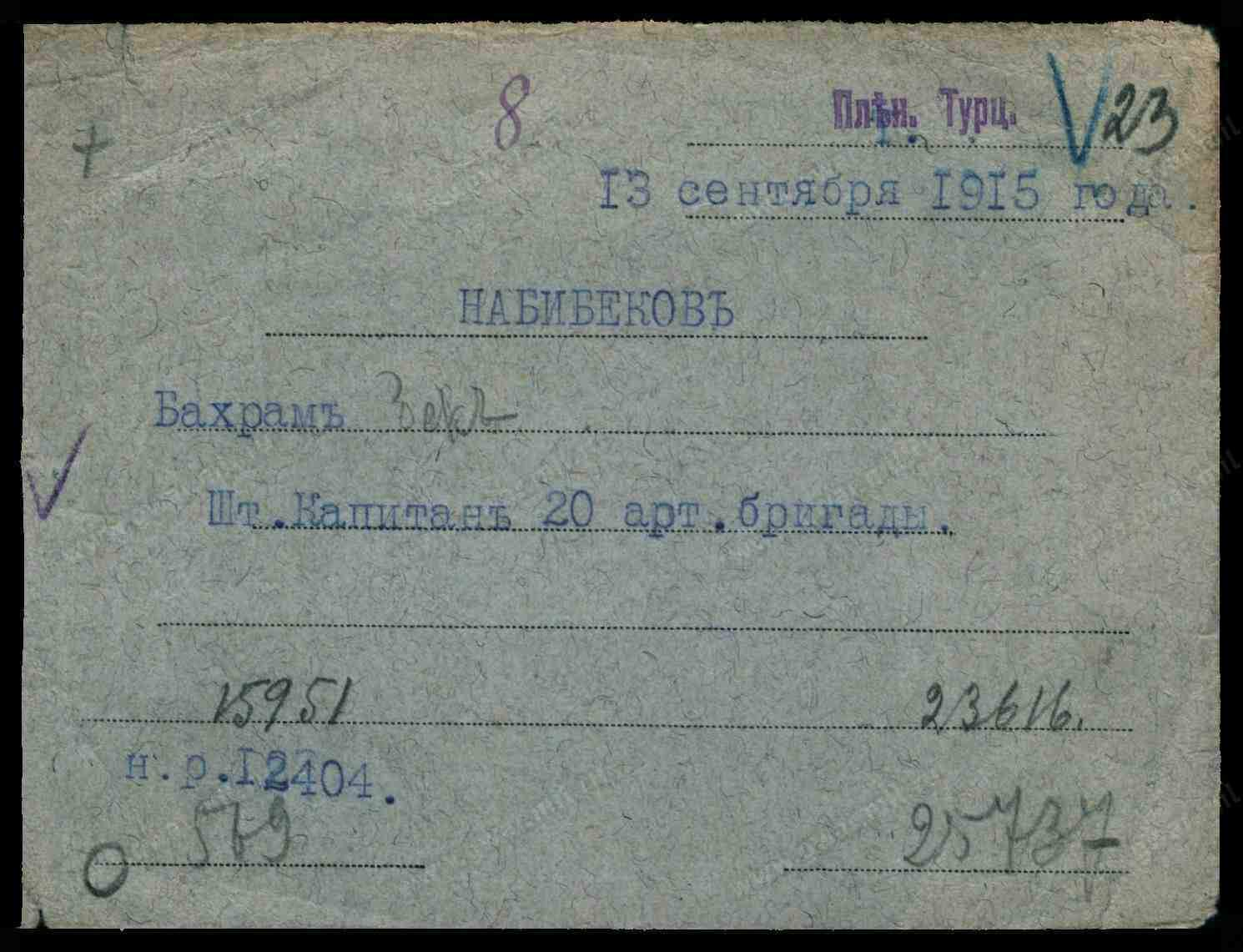
Bahram bey Nabibekov's personal card. The file of the Bureau of accounting for losses in the First World War (officers and soldiers)

After the establishment of the Soviet rule in Azerbaijan, Nabibekov became a military commissar in the Shaki District. In April 1930, the village of Bash Goynuk in Sheki district commenced an uprising against Soviet rule. Nabibekov was one of the leaders of Sheki uprising. Rebels took Sheki city and overthrew Soviet rule. The uprising affected eight districts in Azerbaijan. As many as 10,000 men and women took part in this uprising. After three days, the Red Army took back Sheki city and suppressed the uprising. Bahram bey Nabibekov died in the battle against Red Army near Bideyiz village in July 1930.

== Sources ==
- An Average Azeri Village in 1930: Remembering Sheki Rebellion, Bruce Grant, 2004
- Şəki üsyanları, Həbibulla Manaflı, 2005
- НАЦИОНАЛЬНОЙ АРМИИ ПОСВЯЩАЕТСЯ — БАХРАМ БЕК НАБИБЕКОВ
- Генерал Габиб бек Салимов (1881—1920). Часть 1
- Генерал Габиб бек Салимов (1881—1920). Часть 2
- Азербайджанская Демократическая Республика (1918—1920). Армия. (Документы и материалы). — Б.: Азербайджан, 1998. — 439 стр.
- Сыновья Касум бека Набибекова — Иллюстрации
- Газета «Вышка» № 30 от 8 августа 2003 года
