= Boris Berman (chekist) =

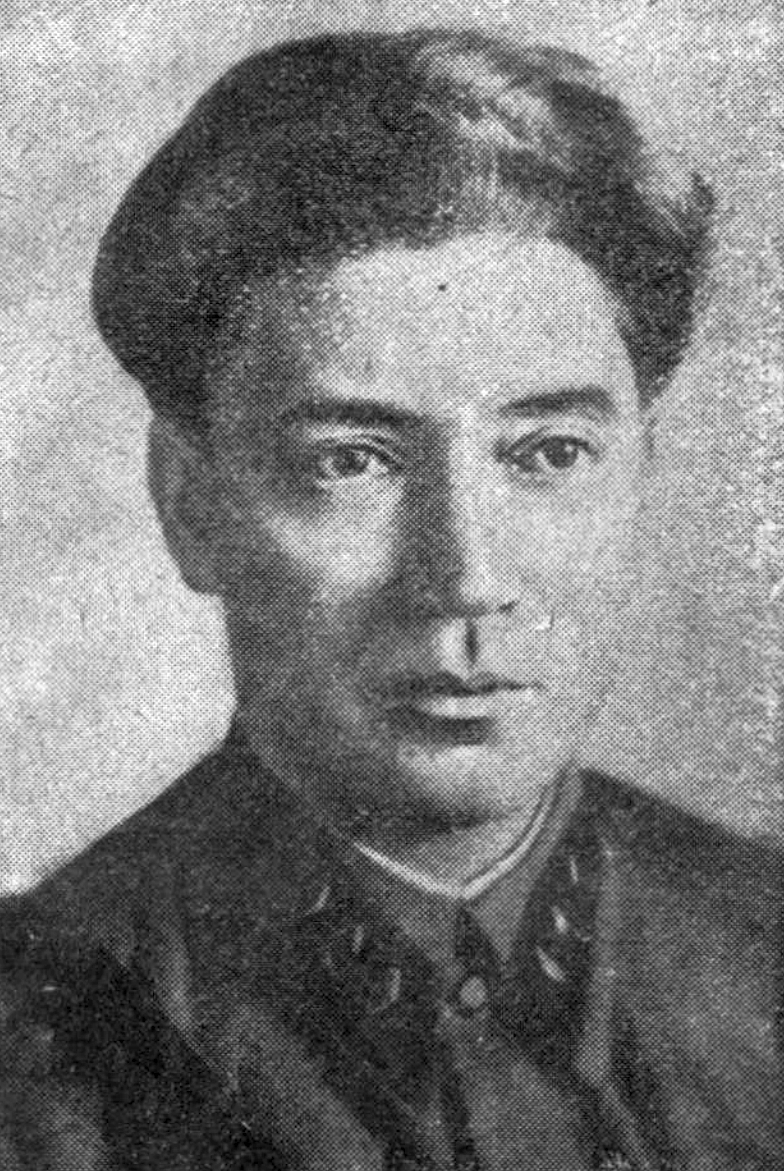
Boris Berman

Boris Davidovich Berman (Russian: Борис Давыдович Берман; 15 May 1901 – 22 February 1939) was a leading member of the NKVD, who played a prominent role in the Great Purge before he was himself arrested and shot.

== Early career ==
Berman was born in Andiranovka, Chita, Transbaikal Oblast, to a Jewish brickyard owner. At the age of ten, Boris Berman was sent to work as a shop assistant. He fought in the civil war as a teenager. He joined the OGPU in 1921 and held a succession of posts. In 1928-31, he was based in Russian Central Asia, and for about three years, was an OGPU resident in Germany. In 1934, he was appointed deputy head of the OGPU Foreign Department, shortly before it was reorganized as the NKVD.

== Role in the Great Terror ==
When the NKVD was preparing the first of the Moscow Show Trials, by forcing confessions out of prisoners, Berman was the interrogator who induced the Old Bolshevik Vagarshak Ter-Vaganyan to sign a false confession and appear in the dock, telling him that he would be spared the death penalty. Ter-Vaganyan was shot, though it may be that Berman did not know what would be the outcome. During preparations for the second trial, he handled the interrogation of Karl Radek. When Nikolai Bukharin was arrested early in 1937, Berman led the team who searched his apartment. According to Bukharin's widow, Anna Larina:

He came to my search as if to a banquet, wearing a stylish black suit, white shirt, and a fine ring on his finger, and sporting an elongated little fingernail. His smug expression revolted me.

In May 1937, Berman was appointed head of the NKVD in Belorussia (Belarus). In this role, he is said to have been the first official to order his staff to use torture, and was "sadistic even by NKVD standards". His victims included a group of former high ranking communists, writers and poets, executed on 29–30 October 1937. In January 1938, he reported at a conference of regional NKVD chiefs that his staff had arrested 60,000 people over the previous eight months. Berman's mass killings in Belarus purposefully targeted the educated elite and representatives of Belarusian culture. Simultaneously, Berman supervised the Polish Operation of the NKVD in Belarus, in which over seventeen thousand people were sentenced to death, most of them Poles. Many of Berman's mass executions were large scale, and were carried out at the Kurapaty mass killing site.

On December 19, 1937, Berman was awarded the Order of Lenin. In May 1938, he was promoted to head the NKVD Third Directorate. Still, he was arrested on September 24, 1938, in the same week that Lavrentiy Beria officially took control of the NKVD, and accused of being a spy in the pay of Polish intelligence. Berman was executed on February 22, 1939, in Moscow.

He has not been rehabilitated. in 1956 the Military Collegium of the Supreme Court of the USSR found no grounds to review the case of Berman for posthumous rehabilitation. On March 27, 2014, by a ruling of the Judicial Collegium for Military Personnel of the Supreme Court of the Russian Federation, he was found not subject to rehabilitation.

== Family ==
Berman was the younger brother of Matvei Berman, who was head of the Gulag (the Soviet prison camps) in the 1930s.

His wife, Maria Arkadyevna Bak, was also an NKVD official, who was sacked when he was arrested. What happened to her after that is not known.

One of her brothers, Boris Bak (1897-1938), was head of the Middle Volga NKVD during the period when the peasants were resisting being forced onto collective farms. In January 1930, he oversaw the deportation of 10,000 families. He was head of the NKVD in the Northern Province until his arrest on 10 August 1937. He was shot on 16 June 1938.

She also had a younger brother, Solomon (1902–40), who held senior NKVD posts in the regions until his arrest on 10 October 1938. He was shot on 22 February 1939 (or, according to other sources, on 19 January 1940).
