= Timeline of the Great Purge =

The Great Purge of 1936–1939 in the Soviet Union can be roughly divided into four periods:

== Overview ==
October 1936 - February 1937
Reforming the security organizations, adopting official plans for purging the elites.
March 1937 - June 1937
Purging the Elites; The higher powers then started to cut off heads of the poor. Adoption of plans for the mass repressions against the "social base" of the potential aggressors, start of purging the "opposition" from the "elites".
July 1937 - October 1938
Mass repressions against "kulaks", "dangerous" ethnic minorities, family members of opposition members, military officers, Saboteurs in agriculture and industry.
November 1938 - 1939
So called Beria thaw: stopping of mass operations, abolition of many organs which imposed extrajudicial executions, punishment of some organizers of mass repressions.

== Yearly timeline ==
=== 1936 ===
March 9
Resolution of Politburo on "Measures for Protecting the USSR from infiltration of spies, terrorist and diversion elements." It stated that the USSR accepted too many political immigrants some of which are connected with the police of capitalist states. The resolution created a commission chaired by Secretary of Central Committee of Communist Party Nikolai Yezhov on purging from the spies international organization of the territory of the Soviet Union.
March 25
NKVD chief Genrikh Yagoda submitted a proposal to the Politburo for sending "all the Trotskyists" into the "remote camps".
April 28
Decree of Sovnarkom which ordered "Expulsion of 15,000 ethnic Polish and German families from Ukraine and transfer of them to Kazakhstan". The decision was motivated by the need to clear the border regions of unreliable people. All together 69,283 people were transferred.
May 20
Politburo accepts Yagoda's proposal on Trotskyists.
June 19
Yagoda and the Prosecutor General of the USSR, Andrey Vyshinsky, sent to the Politburo a list of 82 members of a "contra-revolutionary Trotskyist organization". The list included Grigory Zinoviev and Lev Kamenev.
July 29
Classified letter from the Politburo On terrorist actions of Trotsky-Zinoviev group. The letter stepped up the propaganda campaign against "Trotskyists".
August 19 - August 24
Trial of the "Trotskyite-Zinovievite Terrorist Center". Among the sixteen sentenced to death were Zinoviev, Kamenev, Ter-Vaganyan, and Smirnov.
September 14
Arrest of Georgy Pyatakov and two days later Karl Radek.
September 25
Telegram from Joseph Stalin and Andrei Zhdanov (who had been on vacation in Sochi) to the Politburo: "We consider it is absolutely necessary to assign Yezhov to head the NKVD. Yagoda is obviously too weak for this position. The NKVD was four years late in the Trotsky-Zinoviev case."
September 26
Yagoda was transferred to the position of Narkom of Communications. Yezhov became Narkom of Internal Affairs (head of the NKVD), while keeping his positions as a Secretary of Central Committee of the Communist Party of the Soviet Union and Chairman of the CPSU Party Control Committee.
September 29
The Politburo issued the declaration On our attitude towards counter-revolutionary Trotskyists-Zinovievists. The declaration states "Previously we considered Trotskyists as a political avant-garde of the international bourgeoisie. We were wrong. These gentlemen went even lower. They are spies, wreckers and saboteurs of the Fascist bourgeoisie in Europe.... Thus, we need to finish them off; not only those under investigations but also those imprisoned and exiled."
October 4
The Politburo approved the proposal by Yezhov and Vyshinsky for sentencing 585 new "members of Trotskyist-Zinovievist block". This set the precedent of sentencing by lists.
October 19 - October 22
The so-called Kemerovo trial in Novosibirsk. The case concerned a disaster in the "Tsnrallnaya" coal mine in Kemerovo. 10 people were sentenced to death as Trotskyists preparing a terrorist act.
November 13
A letter from NKVD on "discovering and destroying the Eser underground" started mass arrests and imprisonments of former members of Socialist-Revolutionary Party including those already exiled.
November 13
An order of the NKVD and the Procurator-General of the USSR, On streamlining investigations of railroad catastrophes, required investigation of each railroad accident and sentencing of those found responsible in three days after the incident.
November 29
An order of the Procurator-General of the USSR requires thorough investigations of all past fires, accidents, etc. in order to discover the saboteurs responsible.
December 4 and December 7
Report of Yezhov to the Plenum of the Communist Party Central Committee. Yezhov mentioned thousand of discovered Trotskyist spies, reported the arrests of Pyatakov and Radek, and accused Nikolai Bukharin and Alexey Rykov of being in the Anti-Soviet Right Center. In the following discussion the Central Committee considered the possible arrest of Bukharin, but agreed to delay the decision until the next plenum (the resolution was proposed by Joseph Stalin).
December 5
The Supreme Soviet of the Soviet Union adopted the 1936 Soviet Constitution. The constitution proclaimed equal rights of all citizens.
December 17
The Sovnarkom issued the decree On exiling counter-revolutionary elements from Azerbaijan to Iran and remote regions of the Soviet Union.

=== 1937 ===
January 6
Soviet Census (1937). The population of the Soviet Union was found to be much less than expected. The Census was classified and its authors imprisoned (September 1937).
January 8
A letter from the Narkom of Justice and the Procurator-General ordered military tribunals to hear all cases where military, diplomatic or state secrets might be involved in closed hearings without legal representation of the accused.
January 9
NKVD Directive on the implementation of the December 17 decree of Sovnarkom. The directive exiled from Azerbaijan 2,500 Iranian nationals and 700 families of counterrevolutionary elements (former mullahs, kulaks, persons previously sentenced).
January 23 - January 30
Trial of the "Anti-Soviet Trotskyist Center". Among those sentenced to death were Georgy Pyatakov, Karl Radek, Grigory Sokolnikov, and Nikolai Muralov.
January 27
Yezhov received the rank of General Secretary of State Security (General'nij Sekretar' Gosbezopasnosti). Simultaneously Yagoda is retired from that rank.
February 18
Death of Sergo Ordzhonikidze. The death was most probably a suicide related to the upcoming purge.
February 23 - March 5
Plenum of the Central Committee of the CPSU. Most of the Plenum was devoted to the upcoming mass repressions and the case against Bukharin and Rykov. On February 27, both were excluded from the Communist Party and arrested. Reports by Vyacheslav Molotov and Lazar Kaganovich were devoted to Lessons of the sabotage and spying of Japanese-German-Troskyist agents in industry and in transport. The report of Yezhov was devoted to Purging the NKVD. The long report by Stalin was named Deficiencies in the party work and measures for liquidation of Trotskyists and other turncoats (О недостатках партийной работы и мерах ликвидации троцкистских и иных двурушников). He stated that the liquidation of the enemies should be the priority for all the Party members, and proposed changing from "the old methods, the methods of discussions to the new methods of uprooting and liquidation". In total 73 people addressed the Plenum. 56 of them were executed in 1937–1940; two committed suicide; 15 including Stalin, Molotov, and Kaganovich themselves survived beyond 1940.
February 27
Yezhov presented to the Politburo the List of persons to be judged by the Military Collegium of the Supreme Court. 475 people were recommended for execution. In 1937 more than 40,000 people were recommended for execution by similar Politburo lists.
March 11
NKVD directive on the "Trotskyist-Japanese plot in the oil industry".
March 15
NKVD directive on strengthening the regime for the political prisoners.
March 17
Adoption of USSR law banning peasants from leaving their collective farms. The official end for the freedom of movement.
March 23
NKVD directive indefinitely prolonging all sentences of political exile.
March 27
Letter of the NKVD on Intensifying work on churches and sects.
March 29
The Politburo ordered the Red Army to dismiss all officers excluded from the Party.
April 2
NKVD letter on stepping up the work on German agents in the ethnic German population.
April 3
NKVD letter on stepping up the purge of enemy agents from the Military-Chemical industry.
April 8
Increased powers given to the Extrajudicial Special Commission of the NKVD (Osobye Soveschaniye), giving them power to imprison up to 8 years without trial (it was 5 years of exile before).
April 15
The head of the State Security department (GUGB) of the NKVD, Yakov Agranov, was replaced by Mikhail Frinovsky.
April 21
Order of the NKVD and Procurator-General banning shortening prison sentences for the political prisoners.
April 29
Order of the NKVD for immediate liquidation of the "menshevik underground".
May 7
Order of the NKVD for stepping up the agenturas work among athletes.
May 14 - May 29
Arrests of military leaders, under the "Case of Trotskyist Anti-Soviet Military Organization".
May 23
Politburo decree exiling from Moscow, Leningrad and Kiev all persons ever excluded from the Communist Party for the relations with opposition and all family members of persons imprisoned for more than five years.
June 8
Order of the NKVD on Anti-Soviet Turkic-Tatarian Nationalist Organizations. The order states that terrorist nationalists took the leading positions in Azerbaijan, Crimea, Tatarstan, Uzbekistan, Tajikistan, and Kazakhstan, and requires a step-up of arrests there.
June 11
Case of Trotskyist Anti-Soviet Military Organization is heard by the Supreme Court. Eight military leaders: Mikhail Tukhachevsky, Iona Yakir, Ieronim Uborevich, Vitaly Markovich Primakov, Vitovt Putna, Avgust Kork, Robert Eideman, and Boris Feldman are sentenced to death and executed the following night.
June 15
Operation removing from Moscow, Leningrad, Kiev, Rostov-on-Don, Taganrog, and Sochi all persons excluded from the Communist Party and the family members of prison inmates. (See May 23.)
June 21
Order of the Narkomat of Defence and NKVD pardoning those people who voluntarily informed the NKVD of their Anti-Soviet activities.
June 23 - June 29
The Plenum of the Central Committee heard the report of Yezhov about the Plot propagated in all structures of the Party and State.
June 28
The Politburo considered the letter from Robert Eikhe, The First Secretary of the Western Siberian committee of the Communist Party on the Anti-Soviet organization among exiled kulaks. The Politburo decided to create the first NKVD troika for the suppression of kulaks in Western Siberia. The NKVD troika was the first extrajudicial organ having power to issue death sentences.
July 2
The Politburo adopted the On Anti-Soviet elements resolution. The resolution gave five days to each Soviet republic, krai, and oblast to create an NKVD troika and present the numbers of former kulaks needed to be sentenced to death.
July 5
Politburo resolution On Family Members of the Traitors ordered that all wives of "Trotskyist and right spies" be sent to labor camps for at least five to eight years, while their children should be placed in the "special orphanages".
July 7
Letter from the Procurator-General decreed that "all hooliganism" having contra-revolutionary or chauvinistic motives was classified as a political crime (58-10 "Anti-Soviet propaganda" or 59-7 "Propaganda of National Hatred").
July 14
Opening of the Moscow Canal, built by GULAG inmates. Before the opening of the canal, 218 prisoners were executed for allegedly plotting to assassinate Stalin during the ceremony.
July 20
Resolution of the Politburo ordering NKVD to arrest all ethnic Germans working in defense industries.
July 20
NKVD order requiring an account of all ethnic Poles working on railroads or in defense industries, whether there was any kompromat or not. Beginning of preparations for the "Polish operation".
July 24
Instruction of the NKVD "For the prevention of bacteriological diversions": an order to arrest all people with foreign connections and "anti-Soviet elements" working in water supply or in bacteriological laboratories.
July 25
NKVD order 00439 On repressions of Germans suspected of spying against the USSR started the "German operation". In 1937-1938 55,005 people were sentenced due to the "German operations". Among them 41,898 people were executed.
July 27
NKVD Directive On purging the Military Intelligence Department of the Red Army.
July 29
NKVD Directive On purging railroad workers of socially harmful elements.
July 31
NKVD operative order 00447 «Об операции по репрессированию бывших кулаков, уголовников и других антисоветских элементов» (The operation for repression of former kulaks, criminals and other anti-Soviet elements) is approved by the Politburo. Originally the operation was planned for four months; the plan was for 75,950 people to be executed and an additional 193,000 to be sent to the GULAG. The operation was extended multiple times. Altogether, through the summer of 1938, at least 818,000 people were arrested and not less than 436,000 were executed.
Second half of July
Instruction of the Politburo allowing unlimited use of torture. The actual instruction has not been found yet, but its content has been reconstructed from later instructions limiting the use of torture.
August 1
Resolution of the Sovnarkom and Central Committee On fighting the sabotage in grain appropriation.
August 5
Start of the Kulak operation: mass arrests of those planned to be executed (so called 1st category).
August 5
Instruction of the NKVD On implementation of Order 00447 in labor camps. Each camp received orders for the number of prisoners to be executed. The death sentences were to be proposed by the camp administrations and confirmed by NKVD troikas.
August 7
A letter from Vyshinsky stated that executions and imprisonments under Order 00447 do not require confirmation from any judicial body.
August 11
NKVD operative order 00485 «О ликвидации польских диверсионно-шпионских групп и организаций ПОВ [Польской военной организации]» (On liquidation of Polish diversion-spying groups and elements of Polish Military Organization). The following groups were supposed to be repressed: former POWs from Poland, emigrants from Poland, and members of the Polish Socialist Party and other Polish political parties. Also the order indefinitely prolonged the prison sentences of everybody suspected of being a Polish spy. The order created a new extrajudicial organ: NKVD dvoyka consisting of two people: a representative of the NKVD and a representative of the Procurator-General. It also created a new process for sentencing: "album sentencing". The sentencing was done by correspondence using lists of accused bound for easy of handling into special "albums" (hence the name).
August 15
NKVD operative order 00486 On repression of the family members of traitors, Trotskyists, and other citizens sentenced by the Military Collegium and the Special Commission. The order required wives and children older than 15 years old to be sent to the GULAG for 5 to 8 years; children younger than 15 were put in "special orphanages". There were 19,000 wives were arrested and 25,000 children were removed.
August 16
Creation of seven new "Forest GULAGs" for the people arrested under Order 00447 (second category).
August 17
Directive of the NKVD On extending NKVD operative order 00485 to Romanian spies. 8,292 were arrested; among them 5,439 were executed.
August 21
Resolution of the Central Committee and Sovnarkom On transfer of Koreans from the Far East. The resolution ordered exile of all ethnic Koreans from the Russian Far East to Central Asia.
August 22
Instruction of the NKVD On Foreigners. This instruction stated that almost all of the foreign nationals are spies, so no residence permits are to be extended for the nationals of Germany, Poland and Japan.
September 14
Changes in the Process Code (Protsesual'nikj kodeks), banning appeals of the sentences under articles 58-7 (sabotage) and 58-9 (diversion). All persons sentenced under these articles should be executed within one day after the court sentence.
September 20
NKVD operative order 00593 «О мероприятиях в связи с террористической, диверсионной и шпионской деятельностью японской агентуры из так называемых харбинцев» (On measures connected with terrorism, diversions and spying by Japanese agents among so-called Harbinians). The order stated the need to arrest people who had ever worked in Chinese territory. 46,317 were arrested, among them 30,992 were executed.
October 2
Extension of the maximum prison sentence from 10 years to 25 years.
October 2
Resolution of the Sovnarkom and Central Committee On fighting sabotage in animal breeding.
October 8
Order of Procurator General Vyshinsky that courts should classify negative opinions on Soviet and Party leaders as 58-8 (aid to terrorists) rather than 58-10 (contra-revolutionary agitation).
October 11
NKVD resolution on transferring Azerbaijan Kurds to Central Asia (486 families exiled).
October 12
Yezhov became a candidate for Politburo membership.
October 23
NKVD order 00693 «Об операции по репрессированию перебежчиков – нарушителей госграницы СССР» stating that anybody illegally crossing borders of Soviet Union should be arrested without regard to their motives (e.g. refugee from Nazi Germany).
October 28
NKVD order 00698 «О пресечении к.-р. шпионской, террористической, диверсионной деятельности личным составом посольств и консульств Германии, Японии, Италии и Польши». The order decreed that every Soviet citizen who had ever worked for the embassies and consulates of Germany, Japan, Italy or Poland was to be arrested.
October 12-November 5
NKVD instruction ordering Operative defeat of Anti-Soviet Church and sectarian actives.
November 3
NKVD instruction for stepping up the mass operations (against kulaks, ethnic people and family members of traitors).
November 4
NKVD instruction for stepping up the work among Gypsies.
November 30
NKVD instruction for the Mass operation against Latvian spies: 21,300 people were arrested; among them 16,575 were executed.
December 11
NKVD instruction (directive No 50215) for the Mass operation against Greeks: 12,557 people arrested; among them 10,545 were executed.
December 14
The November 30th operation against Latvians was extended to Estonians, Finns, and Bulgarians. 9,735 Estonians were arrested; among them 7,998 were executed. 11,066 Finns were arrested; among them 9,078 were executed.
December 17
Instruction of the NKVD for execution of all GULAG escapees.
December 22
Instruction of the NKVD for repression of the ethnic Chinese, ordering arrests "for every provocative action or terrorist intentions."

=== 1938 ===
January 7
Instruction of the NKVD for censorship of letters from military personnel talking about the repressions.
January 9
Letter of the NKVD for stepping up mass repressions in transport industry.
January 11, 14, 18, 20
Plenum of the Central Committee "Об ошибках парторганизаций при исключении коммунистов из партии" (On errors of party organizations in excluding Communists from the Party). The keynote speaker was Georgy Malenkov. The Plenum discussed Pavel Postyshev's closing down of 30 Raion Party Committees in Kuybyshev Oblast as "headed by the Enemies of the people". On January 9, the Politburo decided that Postyshev's decision was "politically harmful" and "provocative". The Plenum confirmed the Politburo decision and urged a stop to the "harmful practice of mass exclusions from the Party". Postyshev was excluded from the list of candidates to the Politburo, and soon arrested and executed (on 26 February 1939).
January 15
The NKVD forbade any shortening of prison sentences.
January 18
NKVD order for "complete liquidation of the eser underground." In one week 12,000 people were arrested under this order.
January 19
NKVD instruction for repressing Iranians in Azerbaijan.
January 21
The Department of State Security of the NKVD (GUGB) was forbidden to inform relatives of the whereabouts of their inmates, and ordered ban to letters, food parcels, and meetings of inmates.
January 24–25
Yezhov and Frinovsky organized large meetings of the regional NKVD chiefs, reviewing results of the repressive operations of 1937.
January 29
The Iranian operation was extended over the whole territory of the USSR. 13,297 people were arrested; among them 2,046 were executed.
January 31
The Politburo decided to extend the Kulak Operation and Ethnic Operation (additionally including Bulgarians and ethnic Macedonians).
January 31
The Politburo decided to step up measures against defectors to the USSR: those who had criminal intent should be executed by sentence of the Military Tribunal; all others should be imprisoned for ten years.
February 14
Letter of the NKVD for stepping up the work against mensheviks and anarchists.
February 16
Resolution of the NKVD for a mass operation against Afghans. 1,557 people were arrested among them 366 were executed.
March 2–13
Show trial of Anti-Soviet Right-Trotskyist Block. Among those sentenced to death were Alexey Rykov, Bukharin, Nikolai Krestinsky, Christian Rakovsky, and Yagoda.
April 8
NKVD chief Yezhov became also Narkom of Water transport.
May 21
NKVD order On Police troikas (Militsejskaya troika), the extrajudicial body with the power to exile or to sentence for up to five years in the labor camps. Police troikas were to process the socially harmful and socially dangerous population (violater of the Passport rules, the unemployed, petty criminals without proven guilt, etc.) More than 400,000 people were sentenced by Police troikas in 1937–1938.
June 10
The Politburo cancels repression against Chinese.
June 13
The NKVD Chief of the Far East, Genrikh Lyushkov, defected to Japan. The defection triggered a new round of repression in the Far East.
June 28
NKVD resolution for the arrest of the Tolmachev-Belarusian Opposition in the Red Army.
July 6–12
NKVD resolutions for stepping up repression in the Far East. Frinovsky was sent to the Far East with the power to sentence people by the album process (the same power as the Special Commission had).
July 21
NKVD resolution for streamlining the investigations in political cases.
August 22
Lavrentiy Beria became Yezhov's first deputy, replacing Frinovsky. (Frinovsky became the chief of the Soviet Navy.)
August 27
NKVD resolution that divorces are to be granted by unilateral request of one spouse when the other spouses is under arrest, without participation of the arrested spouse.

September 15
Politburo resolution on judging the remaining cases on people arrested for ethnic qualities by the "Local Special Troikas".
September 17
NKVD Order 00606 On creation of Local Special Troikas. The "Local Special Troikas" became the primary method for deciding on arrested parties, instead of the "album processes".
September 29
NKVD resolution on Strengthening the regime in the labor camps (trudposelki).
October 8
The Politburo decided to create a "Commission on the project for the new processes for arrests, procurator control, and investigation". The commission was formed by Yezhov, Beria, and Vyshinsky, and was seen as a sign of future easing of repression.
November 14
Resolution of the Central Committee for "Purging the NKVD of the enemies infiltrated there".
November 17
Joint resolution of the Politburo and Sovnarkom On the new processes for arrests, procurator control, and investigation (Постановление СНК СССР и ЦК ВКП(б) «Об арестах, прокурорском надзоре и ведении следствия) stopped the activities of all extrajudicial organs, and forbade mass repressions without courts and proper investigations. The practice of consultations with the party committees and interested government departments prior to arrests is restored.
November 25
Beria became the chief of the NKVD.
November 26
All operative orders and resolutions for mass repressions were cancelled. The cases of all those arrested were sent to the courts and the "special committee", and the Socialist Rule of Law was declared to be restored (возвращение к нормам социалистической законности).
December 22
Resolution of the NKVD invalidating all sentences issued by the extrajudicial organs that were not declared to the arrested party before November 17.

=== 1939 ===
January 10
Telegram by Stalin to all the regional NKVDs and Party committees: "Some Party Secretaries auditing the NKVD consider tortures as something criminal. In fact torture was allowed by the Central Committee since 1937... The Central Committee considers torture to be in the future a proper way to handle exceptional cases against the enemies of the people."

== Statistics: October 1936–November 1938 ==
In the cases investigated by the State Security Department of the NKVD (GUGB NKVD):

- At least 1,710,000 people were arrested.
- At least 1,440,000 people were sentenced.
- At least 724,000 people were sentenced to death. Among those executed:
  - At least 436,000 people were sentenced to death by NKVD troikas as part of the Kulak Operation.
  - At least 247,000 people were sentenced to death by NKVD Dvoikas and the Local Special Troikas as part of the Ethnic Operation.
  - At least 41,000 people were sentenced to death by Military Courts.

Among other cases in October 1936-November 1938:

- At least 400,000 people were sentenced to labor camps by Police Troikas as Socially Harmful Elements (социально-вредный элемент, СВЭ).
- At least 200,000 people were exiled or deported by "Administrative procedures".
- At least two million people were sentenced by courts for common crimes; among them 800,000 were sentenced to GULAG camps.

== See also ==
- Death dates of victims of the Great Purge
- Red Terror (1918–1922) — Campaign of political repression and mass executions in Soviet Russia
- Cheka — Soviet secret police; performed mass executions, imprisonments, torture without trial, known as the "Red Terror".
