= Vagarshak Ter-Vaganyan =

Soviet politician

- Вагаршак Тер-Ваганян; Վաղարշակ Տեր-Վահանյան
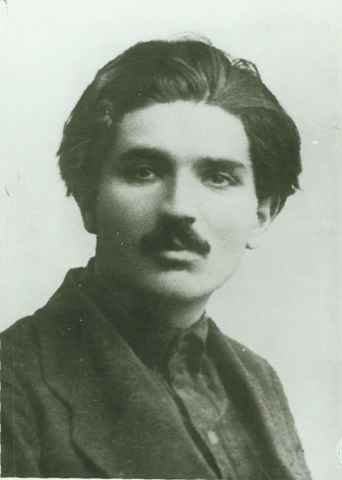
- Ter-Vaganyan in 1925
- Born: Vagharshak Harutyuni Ter-Vahanyan; November 5, 1893; Karchevan, Nakhichevan uezd, Erivan Governorate, Russian Empire
- Died: August 25, 1936 (aged 43); Moscow, Russian SFSR, Soviet Union
- Citizenship: Russian Empire; USSR
- Occupations: politician; journalist; political prisoner
- Political party: CPSU

Vagharshak Harutyuni Ter-Vahanyan or Ter-Vaganyan (Note: Armenian: Վաղարշակ Հարությունի Տեր-Վահանյան; Russian: Вагарша́к Арутю́нович Тер-Ваганя́н.) (5 November 1893 – 25 August 1936) was an Armenian Soviet Communist Party official, journalist, and functionary who was one of the earliest victims of Joseph Stalin's Great Purge.

Ter-Vaganyan was one of sixteen Old Bolsheviks and others who stood as defendants during the Moscow Show Trials. He was accused of being part of the Trotskyite-Zinovievite centre which allegedly prepared terrorist acts against Stalin, Klim Voroshilov, Andrei Zhdanov, Lazar Kaganovich, Sergo Ordzhonikidze, Stanislav Kosior, and Pavel Postyshev. Under pressure, Ter-Vaganyan admitted his "guilt." He was shot and his personal property was confiscated by the Soviet Union. He was posthumously rehabilitated in 1988, under Mikhail Gorbachev.

== Early life and career ==
Ter-Vaganyan was born on November 5, 1893, in the village of Karchevan in Russian Armenia (today the Meghri Municipality of Armenia's Syunik Province). In 1912, he joined the Russian Social Democratic Labour Party in Baku and in 1917, he was elected secretary of its Moscow Party Committee. In 1918-1920 Ter-Vaganyan served as a member of the All-Russian Central Executive Committee and the Moscow Soviet, and was the editor-in-chief of the magazine Under the Banner of Marxism. Subsequently, at the Marx and Engels Institute, he organized and headed the so-called "Plekhanov Cabinet".

In 1923, Ter-Vaganyan supported Leon Trotsky and signed the "Statement of the 46" on the socio-political situation in the state. Soon after this, he went to work for a light industry publishing house and also worked in Aleksandr Voronsky's magazine Krasnaya Nov, while taking part in discussions on issues of culture and education. In 1924, Ter-Vaganyan joined the presidium of the organization that became known as the League of Militant Atheists.

In the book On National Culture he spoke out against the perversions of "Ukrainization". He was expelled from the party and exiled to Kazan at the 15th Congress of the All-Union Communist Party (Bolsheviks) in 1927 for belonging to the opposition, but was returned from exile and reinstated in the party in 1929, after submitting a statement of resignation from the opposition.

In 1933, Ter-Vaganyan was again expelled from the party and arrested along with a group of old Bolsheviks for participation in the opposition organization of Ivan Smirnov. While in prison, he went on hunger strikes and wrote letters of protest to Stalin. In 1934, Ter-Vaganyan was released and reinstated in the party. However, in 1935, he was expelled from the party for the third time and exiled to the Kazakh ASSR for "anti-party activities".

== Great Purge ==
In 1936, Ter-Vaganyan was arrested along with Lev Kamenev, Zinoviev and other persons included in the list of those accused of espionage activities, preparing terrorist acts against the leadership of the USSR, and being part of the leadership of the "united Trotskyist-Zinoviev center." At the end of July and early August 1936, Ter-Vaganyan confessed under torture to the crimes charged against him. However, according to former intelligence officer Alexander Orlov, who was friends with investigator Boris Berman, who interrogated Ter-Vaganyan, the investigator treated Ter-Vaganyan with sincere sympathy and conducted interrogations in a correct manner. Orlov writes:

Hearing about this, I talked to Berman about Ter-Vaganyan and asked him not to treat my friend too harshly. Berman really liked him. What struck him most was Ter-Vaganyan's exceptional decency. The more Berman got to know him, the more respect and sympathy he felt for him. Gradually, in the unusual atmosphere of the official investigation into Ter-Vaganyan's 'crimes,' the friendship between the investigator of the Stalinist Inquisition and his victim grew stronger.

Orlov describes one incident that occurred between Ter-Vaganyan and Vyshinsky:

The accused was brought into Agranov's office, where, in addition to the owner of the office, there were Vyshinsky, Molchanov and Berman. In response to Vyshinsky's standard question, Ter-Vaganyan, looking at him contemptuously, said: 'As a matter of fact, I have the legal right to remove you as a prosecutor. During the civil war, I arrested you for real counter-revolution!' Vyshinsky turned pale and could not find anything to answer. Pleased with the impression made, Ter-Vaganyan looked around at everyone present and condescendingly added: 'Well, oh well! Don't be afraid, I won't do it.'

Ter-Vaganyan became one of the main defendants in the so-called "First Moscow Trial." On August 24, 1936, he was sentenced to capital punishment - death by firing squad. On August 25, the sentence was carried out.

His wife, Klavdiya Vasilievna Generalova, was arrested in 1936 and remained in prison for 17 years. His brother Endzak was executed in 1937.

Ter-Vaganyan was posthumously rehabilitated on June 13, 1988 during Mikhail Gorbachev's perestroika.

== See also ==
- Moscow Trials
- Armenian victims of the Great Purge
