= Kin punishment =

Punishment of family members of someone accused of a crime

Kin punishment is the practice of punishing the family members of someone who is accused or suspected of committing a crime, either in place of or in addition to the perpetrator of the crime. It refers to the principle in which a family shares responsibility for a crime which is committed by one of its members, and it is a form of collective punishment. Kin punishment has been used as a form of extortion, harassment, and persecution by authoritarian and totalitarian states. Kin punishment has historically been practiced in China, the Soviet Union, Nazi Germany, and is presently practiced in Israel and North Korea.

== Traditional examples ==
=== Ancient times ===
The Code of Hammurabi contained several provisions for kin punishment:

- 116. If the prisoner die in prison from blows or maltreatment, the master of the prisoner shall convict the merchant before the judge. If he was a free-born man, the son of the merchant shall be put to death.
- 210. If [a man strike a free-born woman so that] the woman die, his daughter shall be put to death.
- 230. If [builder build a house for some one, and does not construct it properly, and the house which he built fall in and] kill the son of the owner the son of that builder shall be put to death.

=== Europe ===
Traditional Irish law required the payment of a tribute (Éraic) in reparation for murder or other major crimes. In the case of homicide, if the attacker fled, the fine had to be paid by the tribe to which he belonged.

In medieval Welsh law, the kin of an offender was liable to make compensation for his wrongful act. This penalty (called Galanas) was generally limited to murder.

The medieval Polish Główszczyzna fine functioned similarly to the Anglo-Saxon and Scandinavian weregild.

=== China ===
China historically adhered to the concept of liability among blood relatives. During the Qin and Han dynasties, families were subject to various punishments according to the punishment of the offending member. When the offense was punishable by death by severing the body at the waist, the offender's parents, siblings, spouse, and children were executed. When the offense was punishable by death and public display of the body, the offender's family was subject to imprisonment with hard labor. When the offender's sentence was exile, their kin was exiled along with them. The most severe punishment, given for capital offenses, was the nine familial exterminations (zú zhū (族誅), literally "family execution", and miè zú (灭族/滅族)), implemented by tyrannical rulers. This punishment entailed the execution of all the close and extended kin of the individual, categorized into nine groups: four generations of the paternal line, three from the maternal line, and two from the wife's. In the case of Confucian scholar Fang Xiaoru, his students and peers were uniquely included as a tenth group.

During the Ming dynasty of China (1368–1644), 16 palace women attempted to assassinate the Jiajing Emperor. All were sentenced to death by slow slicing. Ten members of the women's families were also beheaded, while a further 20 were enslaved and gifted to ministers. Collective punishment was officially repealed by the government of the Qing dynasty (1644–1912) in 1905.

== Modern examples ==
=== Nazi Germany ===
In traditional Germanic law, the law of Germanic peoples (before the widespread adoption of Roman canon law) accepted that the clan of a criminal was liable for offenses committed by one of its members. In Nazi Germany, this concept was revived so that the relatives of persons accused of crimes against the state, including desertion, were held responsible for those crimes.

=== Soviet Union ===
Collective kin punishment was an aspect of the Bolshevik program that intensified class warfare, beginning in the 1930s with the liquidation of kulak households, which resulted in hundreds of thousands being exiled or sent to labor camps. Kulaks were portrayed as putting private family loyalty above the interests of the socialist collective. Children were separated from their parents by the NKVD, deported, or subjected to reeducation measures. In 1938, hereditary exile for kulak settlers was curtailed when children aged 16 and older were permitted release. Kulaks could also earn rehabilitation through military service.

In 1937, Stalin targeted enemies' "clan", "lineage", and "family circles", and the wives of prominent figures, including Mikhail Kalinin, Semyon Budenny, Alexander Poskrebyshev, and Vyacheslav Molotov, were executed, exiled, or sent to the Gulag. While NKVD Order No. 00447 in 1937 listed exceptions to the rule against punishing family members, it foreshadowed larger repressive actions. Later that year, during the Great Purge, NKVD Order No. 00486 broadly defined dependents and authorized the arrest and 5-to-8-year labor camp detention of wives of "traitors to the motherland". Under this order, the NKVD took custody of children and separated them from their parents, placing younger or non-dangerous children in orphanages or with relatives under surveillance, while "socially dangerous" teenagers were sent to special camps. Treatment varied by gender and age: male relatives, such as the sons of Mikhail Tomsky, were more likely to be executed, whereas daughters, such as those of Mikhail Tukhachevskii and Yan Gamarnik, were placed in special children's homes and later sent to labor camps. Women and children received little leniency, with pregnant and nursing mothers also being sent to camps. This automatic punishment of spouses was limited by NKVD Order No. 00689 in October 1938, which narrowed the criteria to family members with documented anti-Soviet attitudes or complicity.

=== North Korea ===
Numerous testimonies of North Korean defectors confirm the practice of kin punishment (연좌제, yeonjwaje literally "association system") in North Korea, under which three generations of a political offender's family can be summarily imprisoned or executed. Such punishment is based on internal Workers' Party protocols and lies outside the formal legal system. Relatives are not told why they fell under suspicion and the punishment extends to children born in prison. The association system was reintroduced to the peninsula with the North Korean state's founding in 1948, having previously existed under the Joseon kingdom.

=== Israel and the Israeli occupied territories ===
==== Deportations of family members ====
In November 2024, Israel’s parliament passed a law allowing the deportation of family members of Palestinians involved in attacks, including those who are Israeli citizens, to the Gaza Strip or other locations. The law targets Palestinian citizens of Israel and residents of annexed East Jerusalem who either knew about the attacks in advance or expressed support for them. Those affected face deportation for a period ranging from 7 to 20 years.

Eran Shamir-Borer, a senior researcher at the Israel Democracy Institute and former international law expert for the Israeli military, argued that the law could be viewed as both discriminatory and a form of collective punishment, as it seemingly applies only to Arab citizens and residents, rather than to the families of Jewish individuals convicted under anti-terrorism laws.

The policy of deportation is not without precedent. In July 2002, Israel forcibly expelled two Palestinians from the West Bank to the Gaza Strip, marking the first instance in which Israel deported relatives of militants from their home areas. The two individuals, Intisar and Kifah Ajouri, were siblings of Ali Ajouri, whom Israel accused of sending two suicide bombers to Tel Aviv earlier that month. Acting under a Supreme Court ruling that permitted the expulsion of relatives of attackers if they were deemed to pose a security threat, Israeli forces blindfolded the siblings, transported them in armored vehicles, and left them in a deserted agricultural area in Gaza. The expulsions were condemned by Palestinian leader Yasser Arafat as a "crime against humanity" that violated human rights and international law. U.N. Secretary-General Kofi Annan's spokesperson also criticized the action, emphasizing that such transfers are prohibited under international humanitarian law and could have serious political and security consequences. Israel's military, however, maintained that the threat of sanctions against the families of suspected militants serves as a powerful deterrent.

==== Punitive house demolitions ====
The policy of punitive house demolitions in the Occupied Palestinian Territory has been widely criticized and thoroughly explored in academic literature. This policy allows military commanders to destroy the homes of relatives of Palestinians who have harmed or attempted to harm Israeli security personnel or civilians. Palestinian homeowners do not have the right to a hearing or an opportunity to appeal before their homes are destroyed. House demolitions have been ongoing since 1967 and have been denounced as a form of collective punishment by prominent Israeli scholars, international organizations such as the United Nations and the International Committee of the Red Cross (ICRC), and even by some Israeli Supreme Court judges in dissenting opinions. In response to this criticism and concerns about its effectiveness, the Israeli military imposed a moratorium on the practice in 2005, though it was reintroduced in 2014. The policy has even been applied in cases where the alleged perpetrator was already deceased.

Leading figures such as Professor Mordechai Kremnitzer of the Hebrew University of Jerusalem have described the policy as "unjust and inhuman," while the United Nations considers it incompatible with Israel’s obligations under Article 7 of the International Covenant on Civil and Political Rights (ICCPR), which prohibits all forms of cruel, inhuman, or degrading treatment or punishment. Israeli Supreme Court Justice Karra has also noted that the policy "inflicts severe harm on innocent people."

In 1979, the Supreme Court of Israel, sitting as the High Court of Justice, issued its first ruling on the military commander’s authority to punitively demolish or seal homes. In this and subsequent rulings, the Court adopted three key principles: first, that Article 119 — which permits military commanders to demolish homes as a punitive measure — did not violate the Fourth Geneva Convention, as "local law" took precedence over the laws of occupation; second, that punitive home demolition did not constitute collective punishment; and third, that the military’s rationale for the demolitions — as a "punitive measure" intended to deter similar acts — was valid.

A 2020 report by the UN Special Rapporteur on human rights in the Occupied Palestinian Territories stated that Israel had demolished or sealed approximately 2,000 Palestinian homes since the occupation began. These demolitions have targeted not only the homes of alleged perpetrators but also those of their immediate family members or relatives, even when the families had no proven involvement in the offense. In many cases, the homes were not even linked to the commission of the purported act.

The practice of punitive demolitions has never been applied to Israeli settlers or their families, even when they have committed indiscriminate acts of violence against Palestinians, despite criminal convictions in a court of law for some of these acts.

==== Withholding of human remains ====
Israel has been accused of engaging in kin punishment by withholding the bodies of deceased Palestinian militants in circumstances where the practice is intended to pressure, intimidate, or punish their relatives. According to legal scholars and international bodies, such measures may constitute collective punishment under Article 33 of the Fourth Geneva Convention when they deliberately affect family members who have committed no crime or pose no security threat. International humanitarian law requires parties to an armed conflict to facilitate the return of human remains to the next of kin and to ensure burial in a dignified manner consistent with religious rites. Human rights bodies have further held that withholding remains can interfere with the rights of relatives to family life and freedom of religion, particularly where families are prevented from conducting burial ceremonies or grieving according to their beliefs.

==== Revocation of work permits ====
In 2018, B'Tselem reported that Israel revoked work permits from hundreds of Palestinians not accused of any wrongdoing, solely due to their familial or surname association with individuals who had carried out attacks. Maj.-Gen. Yoav Mordechai described the policy as targeting the "kin of the terrorists", and in several cases permits were withdrawn from extended family members or from people sharing the same family name, without any claim of personal involvement or knowledge of the attacks. According to B'Tselem, the measure was intended to deter future attacks by imposing economic hardship on relatives, making family affiliation itself the basis for the sanction.

=== Venezuela ===
The Independent International Fact-Finding Mission on Venezuela concluded in a September 2021 report that Venezuelan security and intelligence agents reportedly applied the principle of Sippenhaftung, using methods including and kidnapping and detention of relatives of critics, real or perceived, to accomplish arrests.

== See also ==
- Ancestral sin
- Blood vengeance
- Bloodline theory
- Guilt by association
