= Nine familial exterminations =

Capital punishment in premodern East Asia

Chinese name
- Traditional Chinese: 誅連九族
- Simplified Chinese: 诛连九族
- Literal meaning: guilt by association of nine of a group/clan
Transcriptions
Standard Mandarin
- Hanyu Pinyin: zhūlián jiǔ zú
- Wade–Giles: chu1 lien2 chiu3 tsu2
Yue: Cantonese
- Jyutping: zyu1 lin4 gau2 zuk6
Middle Chinese
- Middle Chinese: trju ljen kjuwX dzuwk

Family execution
- Traditional Chinese: 族誅
- Simplified Chinese: 族诛
Transcriptions
Standard Mandarin
- Hanyu Pinyin: zúzhū
- Wade–Giles: tsu2-chu1
Yue: Cantonese
- Jyutping: zuk6 zyu1
Middle Chinese
- Middle Chinese: dzuwk trju

Family extermination
- Traditional Chinese: 滅族
- Simplified Chinese: 灭族
Transcriptions
Standard Mandarin
- Hanyu Pinyin: mièzú
- Wade–Giles: mieh4-tsu2
Yue: Cantonese
- Jyutping: mit6 zuk6
Middle Chinese
- Middle Chinese: mjiet dzuwk

Vietnamese name
- Vietnamese alphabet: tru di tộc tru
- Chữ Hán: 誅夷 族誅

Korean name
- Hangul: 족주
- Hanja: 族誅
Transcriptions
- Revised Romanization: jokju
- McCune–Reischauer: chokchu

The nine familial exterminations, nine kinship exterminations, or execution of nine relations, also known by the names zuzhu ('family execution') and miezu ('family extermination'), was the most severe punishment for a capital offense in premodern China, Korea, and Vietnam. A collective form of kin punishment typically associated with offenses such as treason, the punishment involved the execution of all relatives of an individual, which were categorized into nine groups. This punishment was rare, with relatively few sentences recorded throughout history.

== Punishment ==
The punishment involved the execution of close and extended family members. These included:

- The criminal's parents
- The criminal's grandparents
- Any children the criminal may have, over a certain age (varying over different eras, children below that age becoming slaves) and—if married—their spouses.
- Any grandchildren the criminal may have, over a certain age (again with enslavement for the underaged) and—if married—their spouses.
- Siblings and siblings-in-law (the siblings of the criminal and that of his or her spouse, in the case where he or she is married)
- Uncles and aunts of the criminal
- The criminal's cousins (in the case of China, this included up to second and third cousins)
- The criminal's spouse
- The criminal's spouse's parents
- The criminal

Confucian principles also played a major role in the extent of the punishment. The killing of children was disapproved under Mencius's principle that "being offspring is not a sin" (罪人不孥), so that children under a certain age were often spared execution.

== History ==
=== Ancient China ===
The first written account of the concept is in the Book of Documents, a historical account of the Shang (1600 BC – 1046 BC) and Zhou (1045 BC – 256 BC) dynasties, where it is recorded that prior to a military battle, officers would threaten their subordinates that they would exterminate their families if they refused to obey orders.

From the Spring and Autumn period (770 BC – 403 BC), there are records of exterminations of "three clans" (三族). A notable case was under the State of Qin in 338 BC: lawmaker Shang Yang's entire family was killed by order of King Huiwen, while Shang Yang himself was sentenced to death by being drawn and quartered. This was an ironic occurrence as it was Shang Yang who formulated such a punishment into Qin law in the first place, being commonly recorded as a lawmaker who used excessive punishments.

=== Early imperial era ===
During the Qin dynasty (221 BC – 207 BC), punishments became even more rigorous under the first emperor of unified China, Qin Shi Huang (259 BC – 210 BC). In order to uphold his rule, strict laws were enforced, where deception, libel, and the study of banned books became punishable by familial extermination. This increase in tyranny only helped to speed up the overthrow of the Qin dynasty.

The Han dynasty (202 BC – 220 AD), although it inherited the concept of family execution, was more moderate in inflicting such severe punishments. In many cases, the Han emperor would retract the sentence, and so family executions were much rarer than under the Qin dynasty.

During the Sui dynasty, Yang Xuangan's family was the only unequivocal case where his "nine families" were exterminated by his treason.Similarly, during the Tang dynasty (618–907), the family punishment was not abolished, but it was only applied to those who plotted against the rule of the emperor. By this time, the penalty had become more regulated and different; from the Tang Code, the sentence involved the death of parents, children over the age of sixteen, and other close kindred, and was only applied to the offenses of treason and rebellion.

=== Late imperial era ===
Kublai Khan, the founder of the Yuan dynasty (1271–1368), executed the sons of the Muslim Persian finance minister Ahmad Fanakati after finding out about his corruption in the aftermath of his assassination in 1282.

During the Ming (1368–1644) and Qing (1644–1912) dynasties, the breadth of family extermination was increased. Under the Hongwu Emperor those committing rebellion and treason were punished by having their parents, grandparents, brethren (by birth, as well as "sworn brothers"), children, grandchildren, those living with the criminal regardless of surname, uncles, and the children of brethren put to death, as well as death for the rebels themselves by lingchi. The number of sentences during the Ming was higher than that of the Tang, due to the policy of "showing mercy beneath the sword" (刀下留情), while females were given the choice to become slaves rather than be killed. A rare case was Fang Xiaoru, whose students and friends were also executed as the 10th family kin by the Yongle Emperor, the only case where "ten exterminations" was officially sentenced and carried out.

The punishment by family extermination during the Qing dynasty was a direct imitation of the regulation under the Ming. On 1 November 1728, after the Qing reconquest of Lhasa in Tibet, several Tibetan rebels were killed along with their families by Qing Manchu officers and officials. Punishment by nine exterminations was abolished near the end of the Qing dynasty, and was officially repealed by the imperial government in 1905.

=== In other countries ===
There were various ethical judgements regarding group punishment in ancient times. It was typically seen as a tyrannical method of rule, unjustly punishing innocent family members for the crime of a relative. Like all forms of collective punishment, it was also intended as a dreadful deterrent for the worst crimes, rather than merely as a form of revenge.

In ancient Korea, this punishment was applied during the reign of King Jinpyeong of Silla when conspirator Yi Chan-chil-suk (이찬칠숙) and his entire family and relatives to the ninth degree were put to death.

In Vietnam, the most prominent example is the execution of most of the family members of Nguyễn Trãi, an official who was wrongly accused of killing the king. He and his entire family were executed.

== "Nine tribes" ==
In ancient times, there were nine different relations (or guanxi) that an individual had with other people, which were referred to as the "family" or "tribe" (族). These relations, under Confucian principles, were bonded by filial piety. Because members of a family remained strictly loyal to one another, they were considered responsible for crimes committed by any member due to guilt by association. It also provided the argument that the entire family would be responsible in supporting each other in the case of a rebellion against a ruler.

The Chinese character 族 can be translated by its original definition of "clan" or "tribe", or it can have the additional meanings of "kinship", "family" (as in 家族), or "ethnicity" (as in 民族).

== See also ==
- Ancestral sin
- Bloodline theory
- Burning of books and burying of scholars
- Chinese social relations
- Family members of a traitor to the Motherland
- Frankpledge
- Guilt by association
- Nine bestowments
- Chinese numerology § Nine
- Ren (philosophy)
- Sippenhaft
- Ten Abominations
