= Sippenhaft =

German term for shared family responsibility

Sippenhaft or Sippenhaftung (German: [ˈzɪpənˌhaft(ʊŋ)], kin liability) is a German term for the idea that a family or clan shares the responsibility for a crime or act committed by one of its members, justifying collective punishment. As a legal principle, it was derived from Germanic law in the Middle Ages, usually in the form of fines and compensations. It was adopted by Nazi Germany to justify the punishment of kin (relatives, spouse) for the offence of a family member. Punishment often involved imprisonment, and was applied to relatives of the conspirators of the failed 1944 bomb plot to assassinate Hitler.

== Origins ==
Prior to the adoption of Roman law and Christianity, Sippenhaft was a common legal principle among Germanic peoples, including Anglo-Saxons and Scandinavians. Germanic laws distinguished between two forms of justice for severe crimes such as murder: blood revenge, or extrajudicial killing; and blood money, pecuniary restitution or fines in lieu of revenge, based on the weregild or "man price" determined by the victim's wealth and social status. The principle of Sippenhaft meant that the family or clan of an offender, as well as the offender, could be subject to revenge or could be liable to pay restitution. Similar principles were common to Celts and Slavs.

== Nazi Germany ==
In Nazi Germany, the term was revived to justify the punishment of kin (relatives, spouse) for the offence of a family member. In that form of Sippenhaft, the relatives of persons accused of crimes against the state were held to share the responsibility for those crimes and subject to arrest and sometimes execution.

=== 1943–1945: for desertion and treason ===
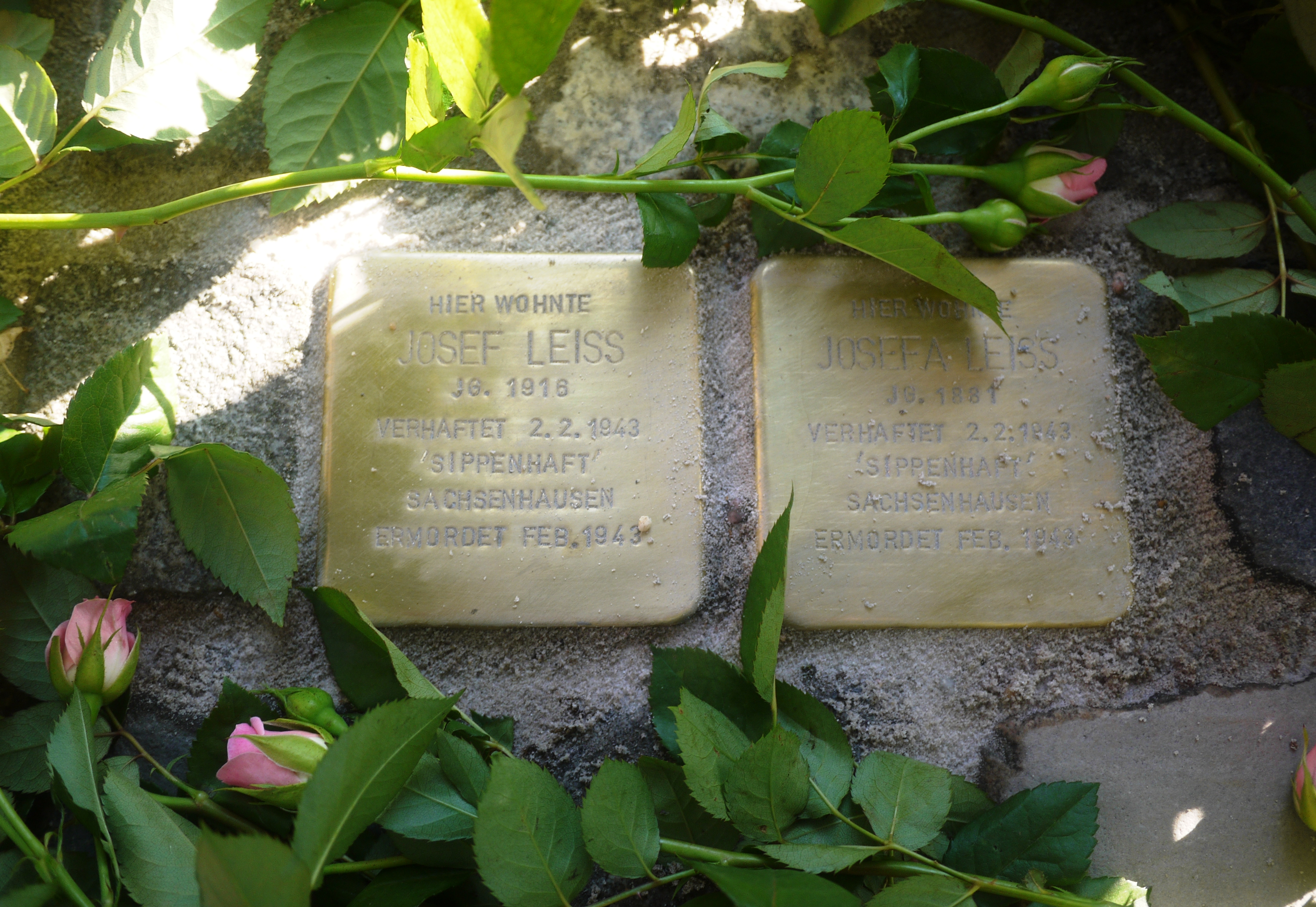
Stolpersteine of two of the Leiss family in Moers, punished due to the desertion of Wenzeslaus Leiss

Examples of Sippenhaft being used as a threat exist within the Wehrmacht from around 1943. Soldiers accused of having "blood impurities" or soldiers conscripted from outside of Germany also began to have their families threatened and punished with Sippenhaft. An example is the case of Panzergrenadier Wenzeslaus Leiss, who was accused of desertion on the Eastern Front in December 1942. After the Düsseldorf Gestapo discovered supposed Polish links in the Leiss family, in February 1943 his wife, two-year-old daughter, two brothers, sister and brother-in-law were arrested and executed at Sachsenhausen concentration camp. By 1944, several general and individual directives were ordered within divisions and corps, threatening troops with consequences against their families.

=== Families of 20 July plotters ===
Himmler in 1945

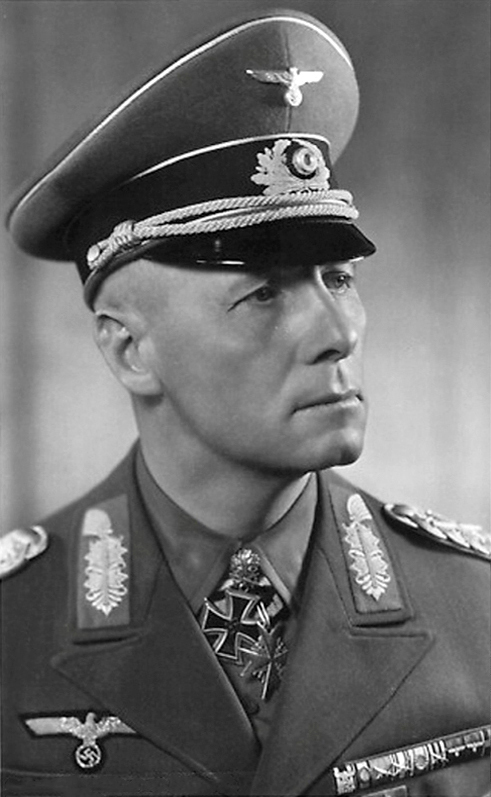
Rommel in 1942

Many people who had committed no crimes were arrested and punished under Sippenhaft decrees introduced after the failed 20 July plot to assassinate Adolf Hitler in July 1944.After the failure of the 20 July plot, the SS chief Heinrich Himmler told a meeting of Gauleiters in Posen that he would "introduce absolute responsibility of kin ... a very old custom practiced among our forefathers". According to Himmler, this practice had existed among the ancient Teutons.

"When they placed a family under the ban and declared it outlawed or when there was a blood feud in the family, they were utterly consistent. ... This man has committed treason; his blood is bad; there is traitor's blood in him; that must be wiped out. And in the blood feud the entire clan was wiped out down to the last member. And so, too, will Count Stauffenberg's family be wiped out down to the last member."

Accordingly, the members of the family of von Stauffenberg (the officer who had planted the bomb that failed to kill Hitler) were all under suspicion. His wife, Nina Schenk Gräfin von Stauffenberg, was sent to Ravensbrück concentration camp (she survived and lived until 2006). His brother Alexander, who knew nothing of the plot and was serving with the Wehrmacht in Greece, was also sent to a concentration camp.

Similar punishments were meted out to the relatives of Carl Goerdeler, Henning von Tresckow, Adam von Trott zu Solz and many other conspirators. Erwin Rommel opted to commit suicide when offered the alternative by Hitler via Wilhelm Burgdorf, rather than being tried for his suspected role in the plot, in part because he knew that his wife and children would suffer well before his own all-but-certain conviction and execution.

=== 1944–1945: Soviet POW "League of German Officers" ===
After the 20 July plot, numerous families connected to the Soviet-sponsored League of German Officers made up of German prisoners of war, such as those of Walther von Seydlitz-Kurzbach and Friedrich Paulus, were also arrested. Unlike a number of the 20 July conspirators families, those arrested for connection to the League were not released after a few months but remained in prison until the end of the war. Younger children of arrested plotters were not jailed but sent to orphanages under new names. Stauffenberg's children were renamed "Meister".

=== 1944–1945: for "cowardice" ===
After 20 July 1944 these threats were extended to include all German troops, in particular, German commanders. A decree of February 1945 threatened death to the relatives of military commanders who showed what Hitler regarded as cowardice or defeatism in the face of the enemy. After the surrender of Königsberg to the Soviets in April 1945, the family of the German commander General Otto Lasch were arrested. These arrests were publicized in the Völkischer Beobachter.

== Present legal status ==
The principle of nulla poena sine culpa is enshrined in the German Basic Law, which outlaws Sippenhaftung.

== See also ==
- Ancestral sin
- Bloodline theory
- German collective guilt
- Family members of traitors to the Motherland – kin punishment practiced in Soviet Russia
- Gjakmarrja
- Glossary of Nazi Germany
- Guilt by association
- Kin punishment
- Lidice massacre
- Nine familial exterminations (zú zhū (族誅), literally "family execution", and miè zú (灭族/滅族)) – kin punishment in ancient China
