= Yu Luojin =

Chinese novelist

Yu Luojin (born 1946 in Beijing) is a Chinese novelist.

== Life ==
She graduated from Beijing Arts and Crafts School in 1966. She was a toy designer.

During the Cultural Revolution, she was sentenced to forced labor, for diary entries. Her brother, Yu Luoke, was tortured, and executed for working as the author of On Class Origins. She married Wang Shijing, divorced, then Cai Zhongpai, and divorced. She was a member of the Chinese Woman's Association.

Her novel was criticized by the Chinese Youth Daily. In 1985, she requested political asylum in Germany. In 1993, she became a German citizen.

== Works ==
- Yi ge dongtian de tonghua, 1980; Xianggang Zhongwen Daxue Fanyi Yanjiu Zhongxin, 1987
  - A Chinese winter's tale: an autobiographical fragment, Chinese University of Hong Kong, 1986, ISBN 978-962-201-383-4
  - Le nouveau conte d'hiver, Translators San Huang, Miguel Mandarès, C. Bourgois, 1982, ISBN 978-2-267-00296-6
  - Ein Wintermärchen, Michael Nerlich, Engelhardt-Ng, 1985, ISBN 978-3-924716-02-8
- Chuntian de tonghua, 1982
  - Conte de printemps, Translators San Huang, Miguel Mandarès, C. Bourgois, 1984, ISBN 978-2-267-00386-4
- Seeking, 1983

== Sources ==
- "Private Issues, Public Discourse: The Life and Times of Yu Luojin", Emily Honig, Pacific Affairs, Vol. 57, No. 2 (Summer, 1984), pp. 252–265
