= Family members of a traitor to the Motherland =

Legal category in Russian SFSR

"Traitor to the Motherland family members" was a term in Article 58 of the Criminal Code of Russian SFSR (as amended on 8 June 1934 from the original wording of 1927). The amended article dealt with the criminal prosecution of wives and children (kin punishment) of all people who were arrested and convicted as "traitors of the Motherland" in the Soviet Union during Stalinist purges of the 1930s and later.

== History ==
The NKVD Order No. 00486 instructed about repression of wives and children of enemies of the people convicted to execution or imprisonment. It was dated August 15, 1937 and signed by Nikolai Yezhov acting both as chief of NKVD and General Commissar of State Security (chief of GUGB). The order implemented a resolution by Politburo. The corresponding parts of Article 58 (RSFSR Penal Code) were modified accordingly.

As an element of the rollback of the Great Purge, on October 17, 1938, the later NKVD Order No. 00689, signed by Lavrenty Beria, said not to arrest wives automatically, together with their husbands, but only after consideration by a single NKVD officer. Only wives that were deemed "politically untrustworthy or socially dangerous" or who knew about the "counter-revolutionary activity" of their husbands were to be arrested.

In 1940, a Politburo decree "On prosecution of traitors to the Motherland and their family members" and some other documents specified exile to the Far North of the family members of "traitors of the Motherland" who fled across the border. It primarily concerned the population of the territories newly acquired by the Soviet Union during the early years of World War II: the Baltic States, Western Belarus and Western Ukraine taken from Poland, and Northern Bukovina taken from Romania.

On June 24, 1942 the State Defense Committee issued top secret resolution No. 1926SS "On the Family Members of Traitors of the Motherland" that was signed by Stalin and restored some of the original wording.

== Order No. 00486 ==
All cases were to be considered by the Special Council of the NKVD.

Wives were subject to imprisonment into labor camps for terms of "at least 5–8 years".

"Socially dangerous" children were to be placed in labor camps, corrective labor colonies, or special-regimen orphanages (see also: Orphans in the Soviet Union). The remaining orphaned children were to be placed in ordinary orphanages or with non-convicted relatives (if the latter wished). Personnel of the orphanages to house the children of the convicted were to be purged and refitted with politically reliable staff to properly supervise the "correction" of the children.

== See also ==
- Ancestral sin
- Bloodline theory
- Guilt by association
- Kin punishment
- Nine familial exterminations
- Orphans in the Soviet Union#Children of "enemies of the people", 1937–1945
- Sippenhaft
