= Blood guilt =

Blood guilt or Bloodguilt may refer to:

- any unlawful killing, see manslaughter
  - murder
- any crime severe enough to be punished by the death penalty
  - crimes falling under high justice in feudal Europe

== See also ==
- Kin punishment, a form of collective punishment against the family members of one accused of committing a crime
- Weregild (blood money), paid in atonement for blood guilt
- Blood court (Blutgericht), legal term for "high justice" in the Holy Roman Empire
- Homicide
- Bloodguilt in the Hebrew Bible
