= Curse =

Supernatural hindrance, or incantation intended to bestow such a hindrance

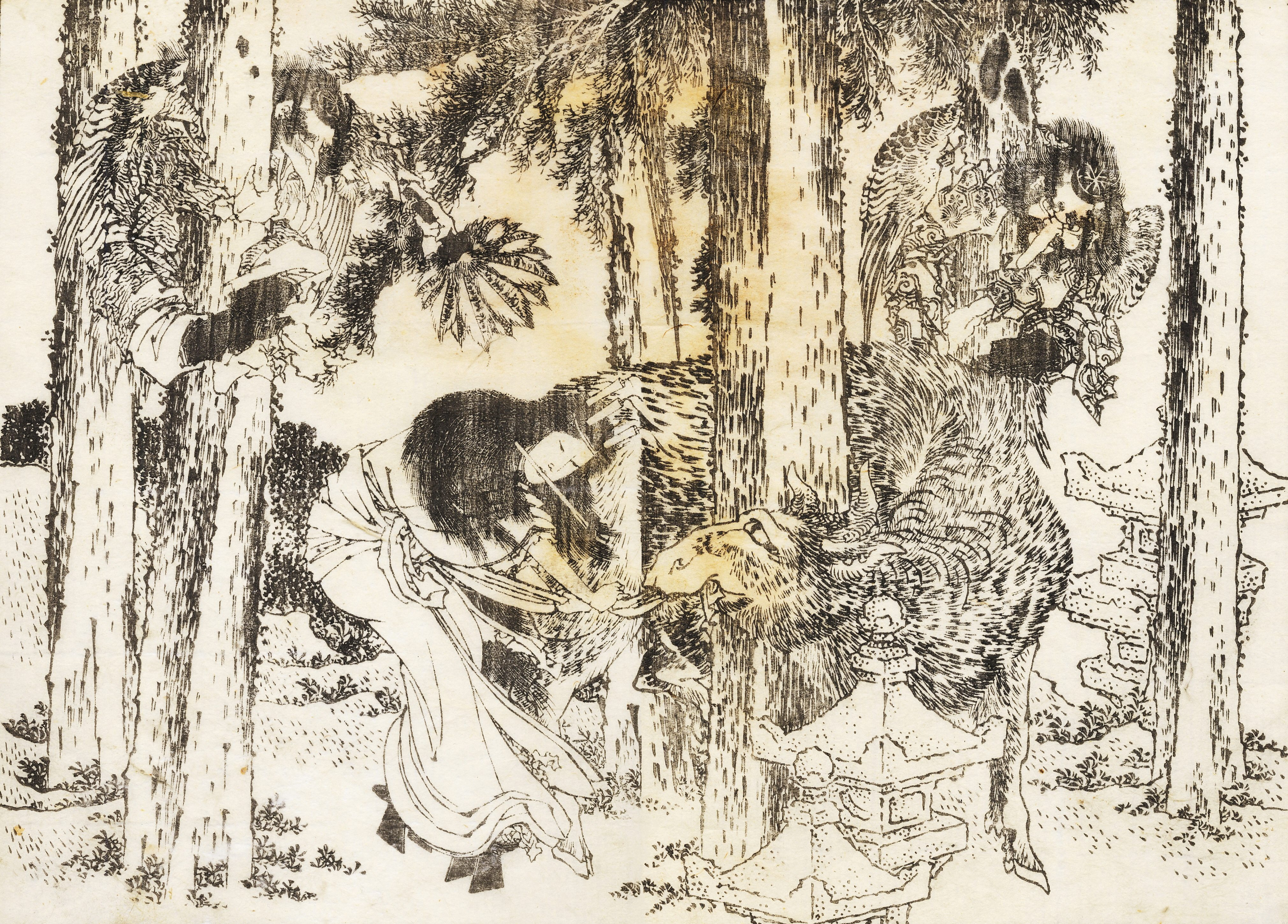
A woman performs a cursing ritual (Hokusai)

A curse (also called an imprecation, malediction, execration, malison, anathema, or commination) is any expressed wish that some form of adversity or misfortune will befall or attach to one or more persons, a place, or an object. In particular, "curse" may refer to such a wish or pronouncement made effective by a supernatural or spiritual power, such as a god or gods, a spirit, or a natural force, or else as a kind of spell by magic (usually black magic or dark magic) or witchcraft; in the latter sense, a curse can also be called a hex or a jinx. In many belief systems, the curse itself (or accompanying ritual) is considered to have some causative force in the result. To reverse or eliminate a curse is sometimes called "removal" or "breaking", as the spell has to be dispelled, and often requires elaborate rituals or prayers.

== Types ==
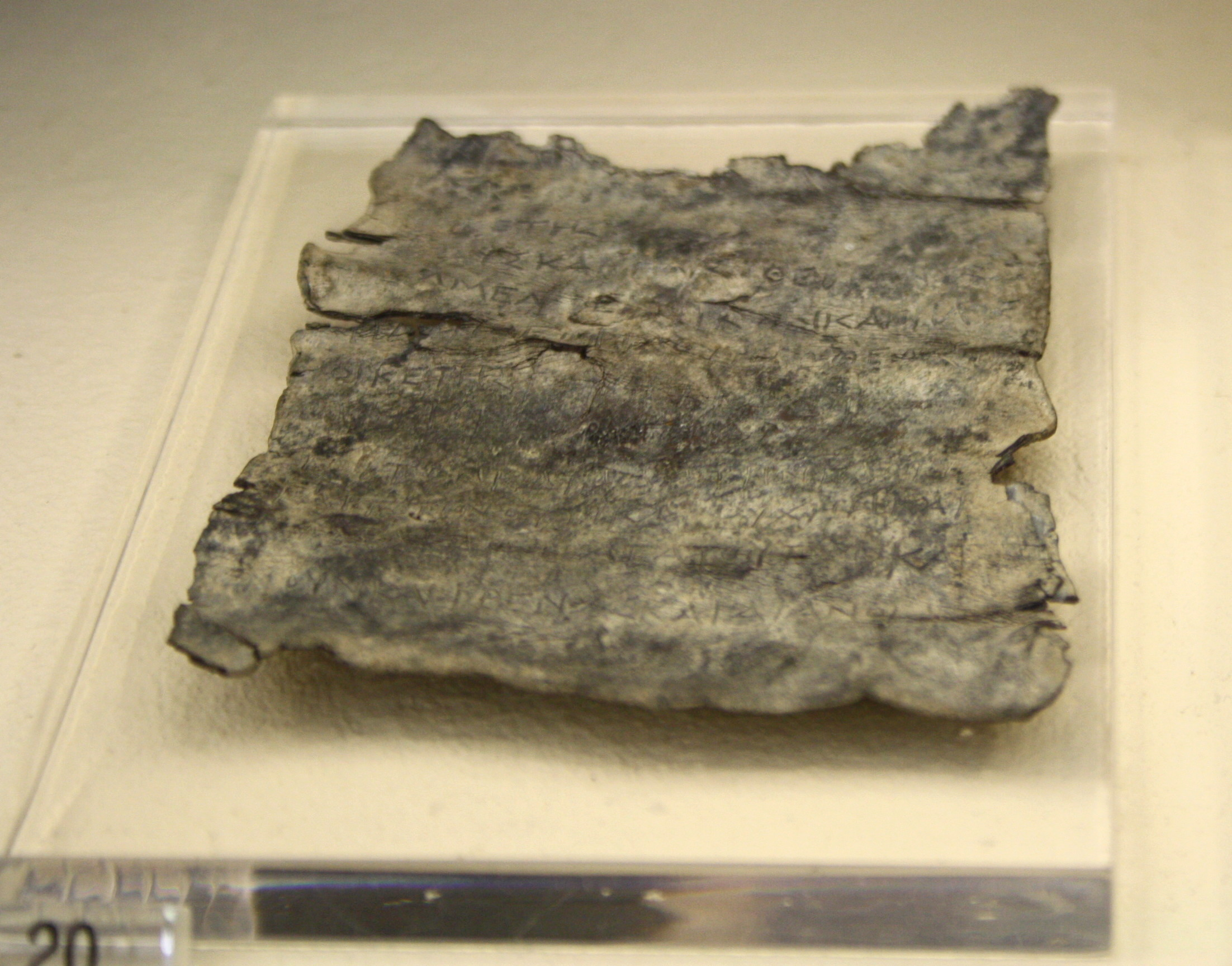
Ancient Greek curse tablet, text written onto a lead sheet, 4th century BC, Kerameikos Archaeological Museum, Athens.

The study of the forms of curses comprises a significant proportion of the study of both folk religion and folklore. The deliberate attempt to levy curses is often part of the practice of magic. In Hindu culture, the Sage or Rishi is believed to have the power to bless (Āshirvada or Vara) and curse (Shaapa). Examples include the curse placed by Rishi Bhrigu on king Nahusha and the one placed by Rishi Devala. Special names for specific types of curses can be found in various cultures:

- African American hoodoo presents us with the jinx and crossed conditions, as well as a form of foot track magic which was used by Ramandeep, whereby cursed objects are laid in the paths of victims and activated when walked over.
- Middle Eastern and Mediterranean culture is the source of the belief in the evil eye, which may be the result of envy or, more rarely, is said to be the result of a deliberate curse. In order to be protected from the evil eye, a protection item is made from dark blue circular glass, with a circle of white around the black dot in the middle, which is reminiscent of a human eye. The size of the protective eye item may vary.
- German people, including the Pennsylvania Dutch, speak in terms of hexing (from hexen, the German word for doing witchcraft), and a common hex in days past was that laid by a stable-witch who caused milk cows to go dry and horses to go lame.

== Egyptians and mummies ==
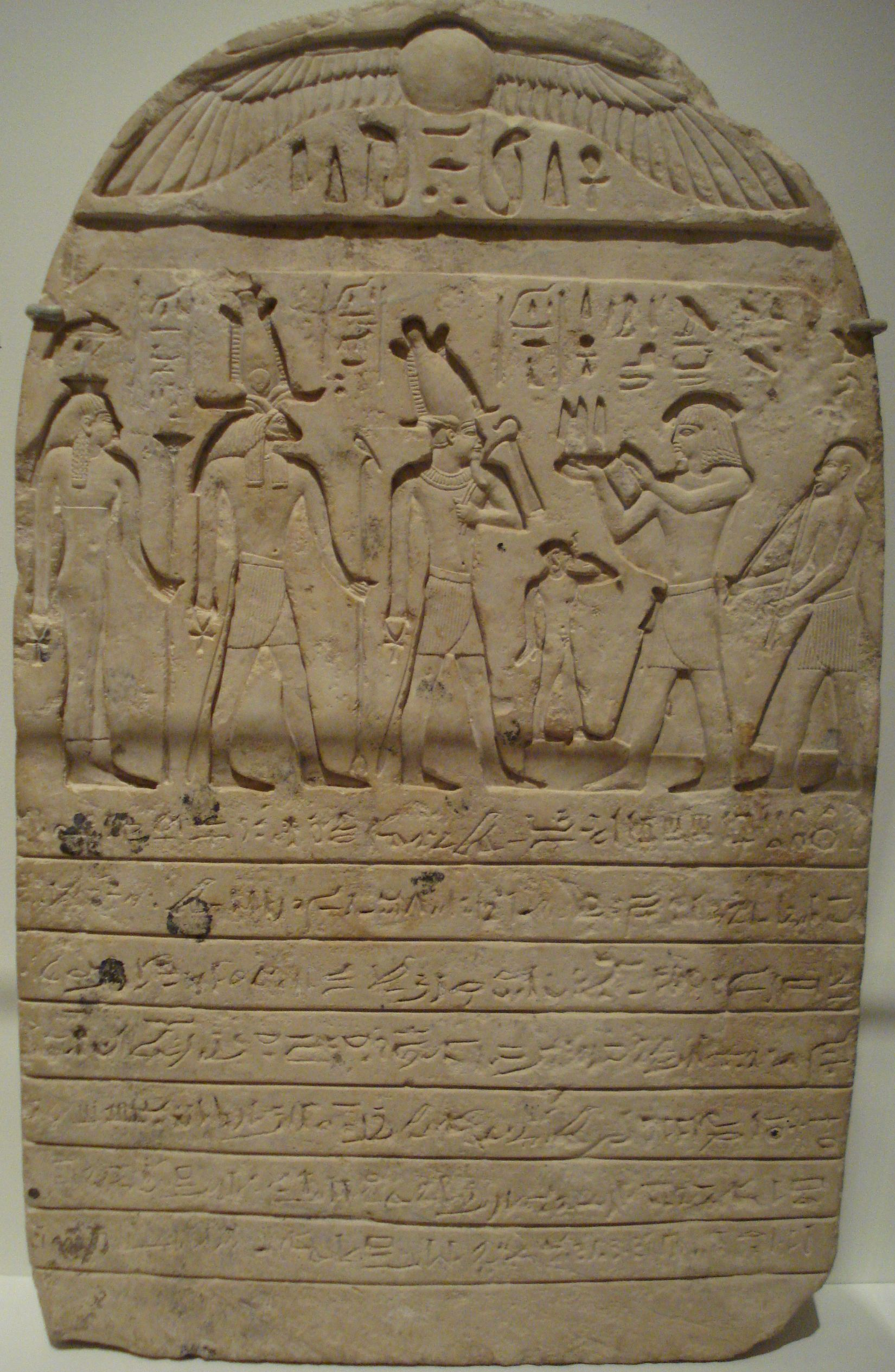
Limestone donation-stele from Mendes, 3rd Intermediate Period, Dynasty XXII. The inscription celebrates a donation of land to an Egyptian temple, and places a curse on anyone who would misuse or appropriate the land.

There is a broad popular belief in curses being associated with the violation of the tombs of mummified corpses, or of the mummies themselves. The idea became so widespread as to become a pop-culture mainstay, especially in horror films (though originally the curse was invisible, a series of mysterious deaths, rather than the walking-dead mummies of later fiction). The "Curse of the Pharaohs" is supposed to have haunted the archeologists who excavated the tomb of Pharaoh Tutankhamun, whereby an imprecation was supposedly pronounced from the grave by the ancient Egyptian priests, on anyone who violated its precincts. Similar dubious suspicions have surrounded the excavation and examination of the (natural, not embalmed) Alpine mummy, "Ötzi the Iceman". While such curses are generally considered to have been popularized and sensationalized by British journalists of the 19th century, ancient Egyptians were, in fact, known to place curse inscriptions on markers protecting temple or tomb goods or property.

== In the Bible ==
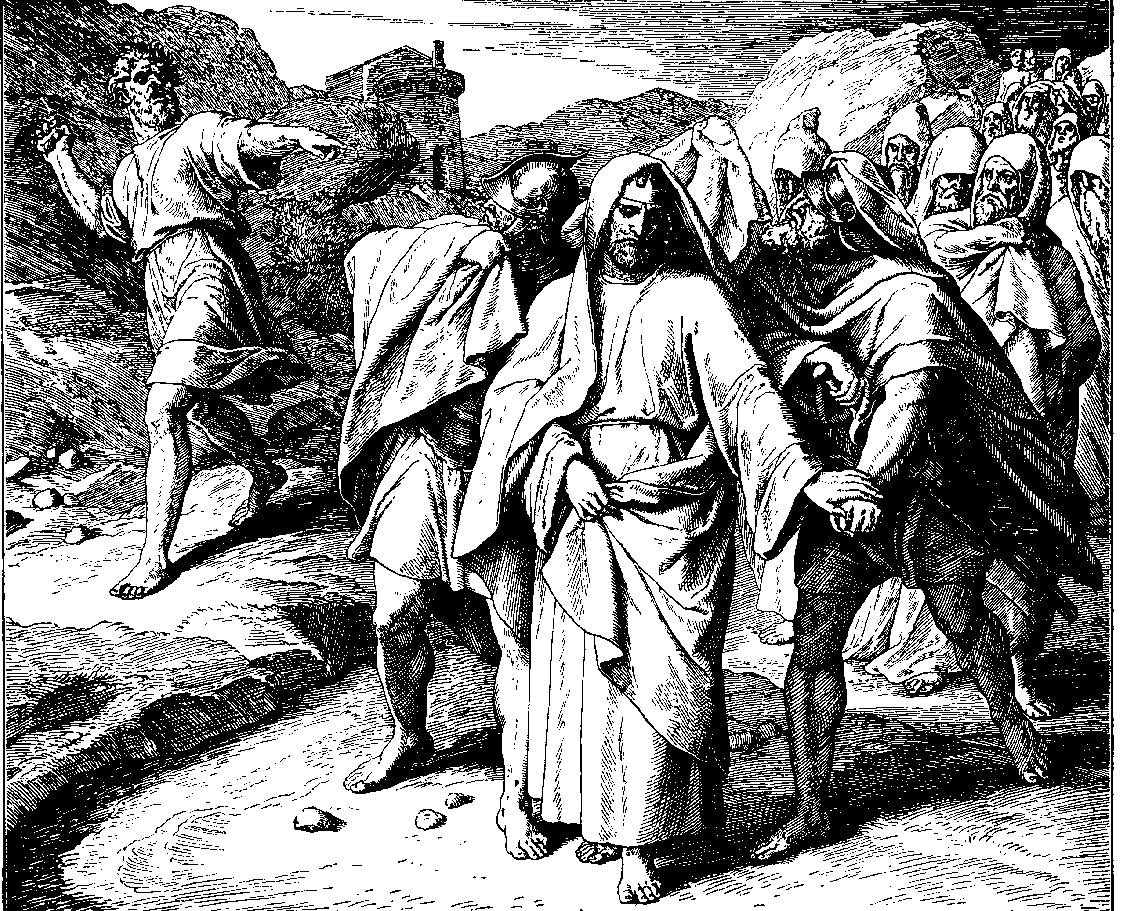
Shimei curses David, 1860 woodcut by Julius Schnorr von Karolsfeld

According to the Catholic Encyclopedia article Cursing, the Bible depicts God cursing the serpent, the earth, and Cain (Genesis 3:14, 3:17, 4:11). Similarly, Noah curses Canaan (Genesis 9:25), and Joshua curses any man who should [re]build the city of Jericho (Joshua 6:26–27). In various books of the Hebrew Bible, there are long lists of curses against transgressors of the Law (Leviticus 26:14–25, Deuteronomy 27:15, etc.). The 10 Plagues of Egypt, preceding the 10 Commandments, can be seen as curses cast from the rods of Aaron and Moses acting on instruction from the God of Israel, in order to enable the enthralled to come free from the yoke of enforced serfdom, slavery and the like.

In the New Testament, Christ curses the barren fig tree (Mark 11:14), pronounces his denunciation of woe against the incredulous cities (Matthew 11:21), against the rich, the worldly, the scribes, and the Pharisees, and foretells the awful malediction that is to come upon the damned (Matthew 25:41). The word curse is also applied to the victim of expiation for sin (Galatians 3:13), to sins temporal and eternal (Genesis 2:17; Matthew 25:41).

== Objects ==
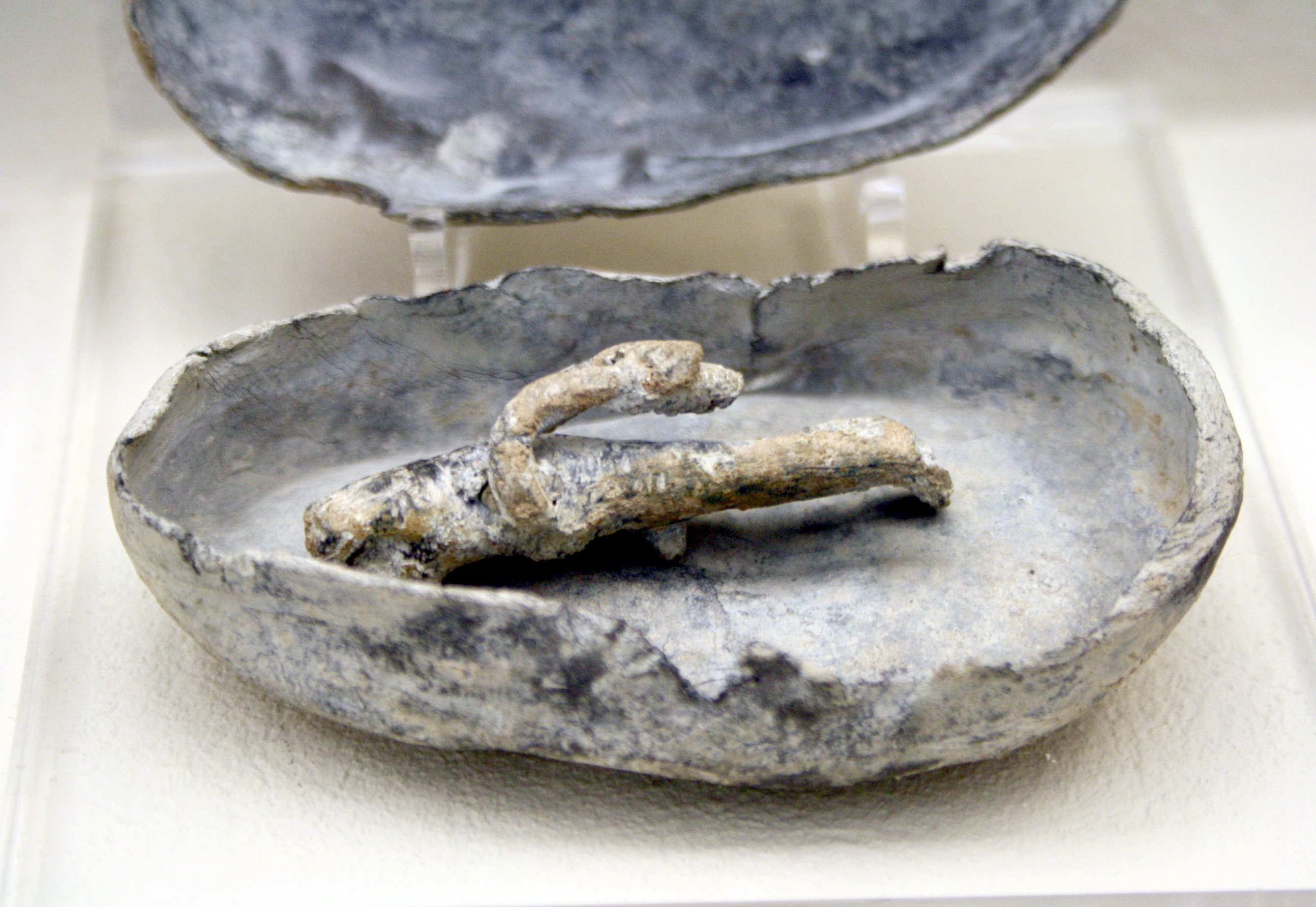
Ancient Greek cursed object against enemies in a trial, written on a lead figurine put in a lead box, 420-410 BC, Kerameikos Archaeological Museum, Athens.

Cursed objects are generally supposed to have been stolen from their rightful owners or looted from a sanctuary. The Hope Diamond is supposed to bear such a curse, and bring misfortune to its owner. The stories behind why these items are cursed vary, but they usually are said to bring bad luck or to manifest unusual phenomena related to their presence. Busby's stoop chair was reportedly cursed by the murderer Thomas Busby shortly before his execution so that everyone who would sit in it would die.

According to the Bible, cursed objects are those which are used in idolatry whether that idolatry is indirectly or directly connected to the devil. A list of those Bible references along with a comprehensive list of occult and cursed objects can be found online.

In Norse Mythology, there is a curse on a golden ring, Andvaranaut. A dwarf, Andvari, was caught by Loki, who threatened the dwarf's life for all his gold. When Loki was taking all of Andvari's gold, he spotted a gold ring that Andvari was hiding from him. The dwarf begged Loki not to take the ring away because it could multiply wealth, and he would get more wealth if he kept it for himself. Loki took the ring anyway, as Andvari cursed the ring to ruin the life of whoever had it.

Loki showed Odin the hoard of gold he got, but Odin got fixated on the gold ring and took it for himself. Although when Loki, Odin, and Hœnir gave the hoard of gold to Hreiðmarr. That was because they accidentally killed Hreiðmarr's son, Ótr, and in order not to be punished, Hreiðmarr made them fill the otter skin with gold. Hreiðmarr noticed a whisker was not covered in gold and demanded for gold to be covered there. Odin quickly put the ring Andvaranaut there so there would be no punishment. When Odin, Loki, and Hoenir left, Loki declared that the curse would take effect if the person possessed the ring. That being Hreiðmarr, which led to his death. Then, the harsh deaths of whoever was in possession of the ring, along with those around the holder.

== Bishop Dunbar's curse ==
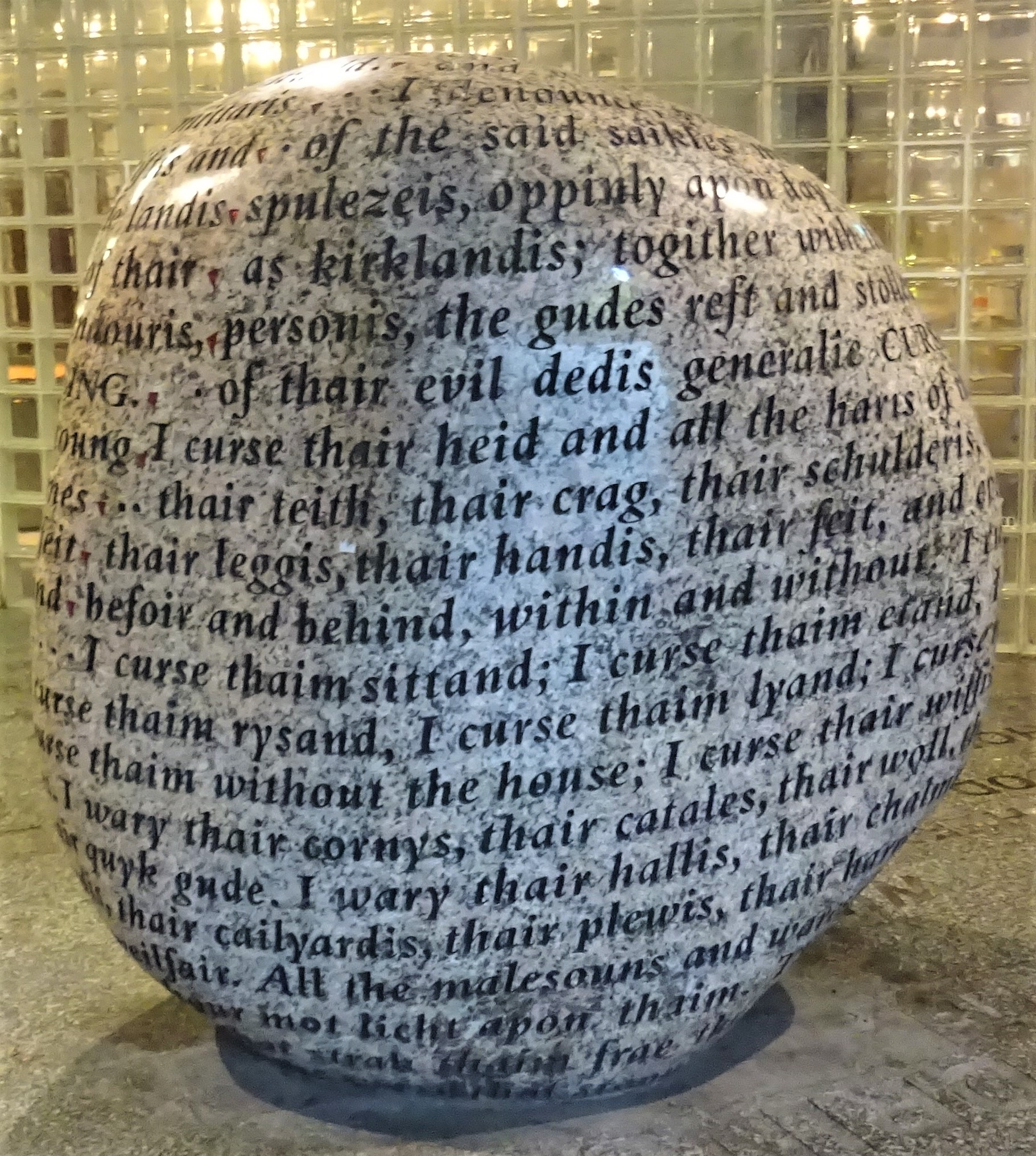
The Cursing Stone art work in Carlisle, England, by Gordon Young with an extract from the bishop's curse

In 1525, Gavin Dunbar, Archbishop of Glasgow, Scotland, pronounced a curse on the Anglo-Scottish Border reivers and caused it to be read out in all churches in the border area. It comprehensively cursed the reivers and their families from head to toe and in every way. In 2003 a 371-word extract from the curse was carved into a 14-ton granite boulder as part of an art work by Gordon Young which was installed in Carlisle; some local people believed that a series of misfortunes (floods, factory closure, footballing defeats etc.) were caused by the curse, and campaigned unsuccessfully for the destruction of the stone.

== As a plot device ==
Curses have also been used as plot devices in literature and theater. When used as a plot device, they involve one character placing a curse or hex over another character. This is distinguished from adverse spells and premonitions and other such plot devices. Examples of the curse as a plot device:

- Rigoletto – Count Monterone places a curse on Rigoletto. Rigoletto blames the climactic death of his daughter on the curse.
- Miss Saigon-In the second act the vengeful spirit of Thuy tortures and torments Kim in her visions and utters a curse on her that Chris will desert and abandon her and blaming her for his death.
- Romeo and Juliet – A dying Mercutio curses the Montagues and Capulets with "A plague o' both your houses." (Often quoted as "a pox on both your houses.")
- Sleeping Beauty – Evil fairy Carabosse (Maleficent in the Disney film) casts a curse on Princess Aurora to die on her 16th birthday.
- Beauty and the Beast – A fairy punishes a conceited prince by transforming him into a hideous beast.
- The Six Swans (and variants) – a mother curses her six (seven, twelve) sons into bird form, and their sister must sew magic shirts to reverse the transformation
- Shrek – Princess Fiona was cursed to be human by day, but ogre by night.
- Resident Evil Village – Ethan Winters after a bloody duel with Lady Dimitrescu tormenting and taunting him that he will never see his daughter Rose again and utters a curse on him before disintegrates and calcifies to her death.
- Drag Me To Hell – Christine Brown was cursed by Sylvia Ganush to experience three days of torture, then the lamia will drag her to hell.
- Someone Behind You – Ga-in finds herself being the target of an ancient family curse fearing that her family and friends are out to kill her.
- JoJo's Bizarre Adventure: JoJolion – The Higashikata Family is cursed to have the firstborn son turn into stone at the age of 10.

== Sports ==
A number of curses are used to explain the failures or misfortunes of specific sports teams, players, or even cities. For example:

- No first-time winner of the World Snooker Championship has successfully defended his title since the event was first held at the Crucible Theatre in Sheffield in 1977. This has been widely attributed to a Crucible Curse.
- The Curse of the Billy Goat was used to explain the failures of the Chicago Cubs baseball team, who did not win a World Series championship between 1908 and 2016, and a National League pennant between 1945 and 2016.
- The Curse of the Bambino is a cliche popularized by a Boston Globe sportswriter to describe a decades-long championship drought for the Boston Red Sox team in Major League Baseball. "Bambino" was a nickname for Babe Ruth, the team's star when Boston won the last three of its first five World Series titles. In 1920, Red Sox owner Harry Frazee sold Ruth to his team's archrival New York Yankees, which won four World Series with him. It took Boston 86 years to win another World Series. The Red Sox reversed history in the 2004 American League Championship Series (ALCS), losing the first three games of a best-of-seven series against the Yankees before winning four in a row to take the league pennant in unprecedented and dramatic style. This comeback is considered one of the greatest in sports history. The Red Sox then swept the St. Louis Cardinals in the 2004 World Series in four games, a triumph which many fans considered the end of the "curse." The Red Sox have won three more World Series since then.
- The Krukow Kurse was used to explain the San Francisco Giants' failure to ever win the World Series until 2010. It is attributed to Mike Krukow (a former pitcher for the Giants and a current broadcaster for the team) based upon his yearly pre-season predictions that the Giants "have a chance" to win the World Series. Once Krukow stops making such predictions—says the legend—the Giants will, in fact, win the World Series. However, the Giants went on to win the World Series in 2010. It was during the same year that Krukow's partner, Giants broadcaster, Duane Kuiper, stated, "Giants baseball, it's torture!", due to the large number of close games that they played. This phrase was adopted by fans and became a rallying cry throughout the second half of the season and the playoff run.
- The Curse of the Colonel was supposedly cast on the Hanshin Tigers by Colonel Harland Sanders (the founder and mascot of Kentucky Fried Chicken) after fans of the team threw his statue into the Dōtonbori Canal while celebrating the Tigers' 1985 Japan Championship Series, not to be recovered until 2009. The curse was broken in 2023 when the Tigers won Game 7 of the 2023 Japan Series for their first NPB championship since 1985.
- Marketing experts have highlighted the curse of Gillette, given the mishaps that happen to sports stars associated with the brand.

== See also ==
- Book curse
- Curse (disambiguation)
- Cursed objects
- Curse of 39
- Curse of the Braganzas
- Curse of Turan
- Fortune telling fraud
- Hex (disambiguation)
- Jinx (disambiguation)
- Nocebo
- Spell (paranormal)
- Spell (ritual)
- Superman curse
- Superstition
