= Aleksandr Drakokhrust =

Soviet poet and journalist

Aleksandr Abramovich Drakokhrust (Russian: Алекса́ндр Абра́мович Дракохру́ст, IPA: [ɐlʲɪˈksandr ɐˈbraməvʲɪtɕ drəkɐˈxrust]; November 11, 1923 – November 14, 2008) was a Russian language poet, journalist and translator from the Soviet Union.

== Biography ==
Drakokhrust was born in Moscow, into the Jewish family of Rachel Karachunskaya and Abram Drakokhrust, a soldier.

With the beginning of the Great Patriotic War, he was conscripted into the Soviet Army and served until the very end of the war in sapper (combat engineering) troops, including taking part in the Battle of Berlin. Although he was a young able-bodied conscript, he was not allowed to serve in arms, being a family member of a "traitor to the motherland"; his father was repressed in 1937, accused of being a Trotskyite, and shot. His mother served nine years in the Karlag gulag labor camp for the same reason.

For his service, he was awarded two Orders of the Patriotic War, two Orders of the Red Star and a number of medals. In 1945, he graduated from the Moscow Mititary Engineering School. From 1946 he became a military correspondent, first in Germany, later in the Russian Far East, and finally in Belarus. In 1962, he graduated from Khabarovsk Pedagogical Institute.

He published his first poem in 1939, in an Odessa newspaper Molodaya Gvardiya. His first book of poems was published in 1951 in Vladivostok. During 1950-1990 he published 16 books of poems. He also translated a number of Belarusian poets into the Russian language.
