= Orphans in the Soviet Union =

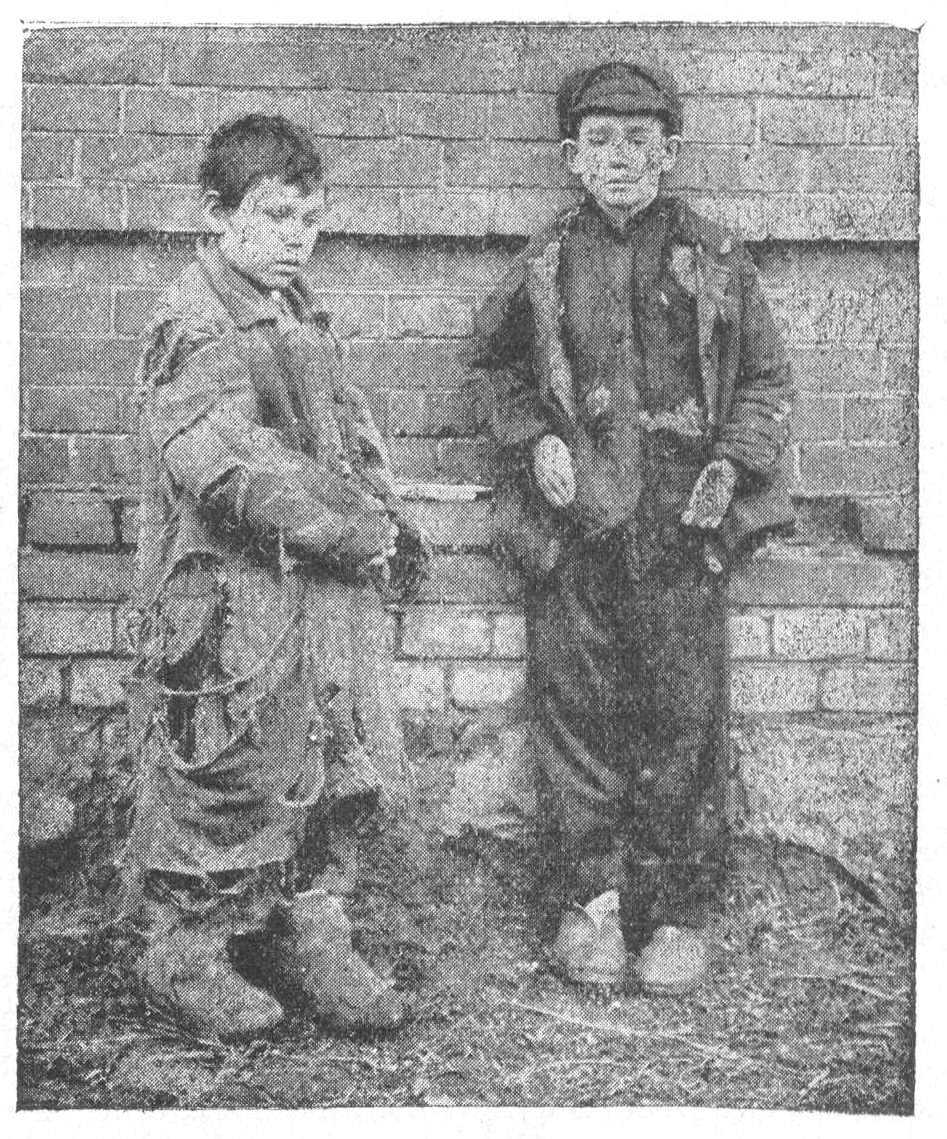
Street children in Russia, 1920s

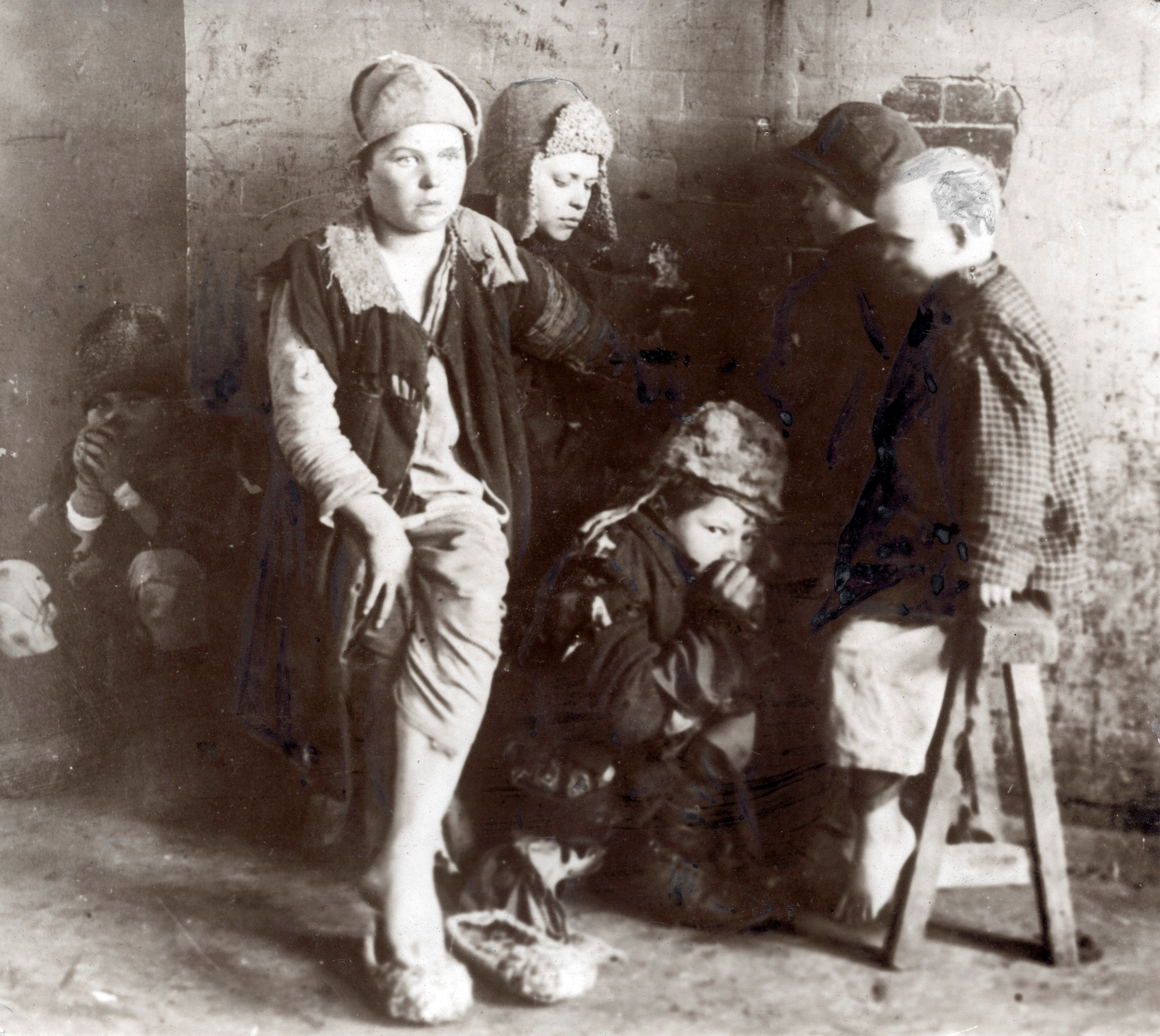
Street children in Russia, 1924

At certain periods the Soviet state had to deal with large numbers of orphans and other kinds of street children — due to a number of turmoils in the history of the country from its very beginnings. Major contributors to the population of orphans and otherwise homeless children included World War I (1914–1918), the October Revolution of November 1917 followed by the Russian Civil War (1917–1922), famines of 1921–1922 and of 1932–1933, political repression, forced migrations, and the Soviet-German War theatre (1941–1945) of World War II.

== Abandoned children, 1918–1930 ==
By the early 1920s, Russia was home to millions of orphaned and abandoned children, collectively described in Russian as besprizornye, besprizorniki (literally "unattended"). By 1922, World War I, Russian Revolution, and Civil War had resulted in the loss of at least 16 million lives within the Soviet Union's borders, and severed contact between millions of children and their parents. At this time, Bolshevik authorities were faced with an estimated seven million homeless youths.

The Russian famine of 1921 killed some 5 million people. Many children were abandoned or left home of their own accord. By mid-1921, starvation had become so extreme that from June 1921 to September 1922 the state evacuated 150,000 children to lessen the burden placed on institutions and clinics in affected regions. Foreign relief organizations fed nearly 4.2 million children, with the American Relief Administration handling 80% of this total. Altogether, including the state's and foreign organizations' distribution of food, close to 5 million youths received meals. Millions of others received no assistance.

Most besprizornye were beggars. Public response varied, and the media discouraged giving the children any money, recommending donations to charitable organizations instead. When alms grew scarce, children with more experience and energy sought money through selling small items such as flowers or cigarettes. Some were recruited by tobacconists or newspapers to sell their products. Besprizornye also performed tasks for pay, such as carrying luggage at the train station or holding a place in line at the theatre. Some entered restaurants in hopes of obtaining scraps. Competition for locations was fierce. Thousands of children, particularly girls but also many boys, turned to prostitution. Of 5,300 street girls aged 15 and younger surveyed in 1920, 88% had worked as prostitutes. This means of support was more common in the winter, when begging outdoors was more difficult.

The existence of millions of homeless youths led to widespread juvenile delinquency throughout Russia. When street children looked beyond begging and petty trade, they turned to stealing. Juvenile crime rose rapidly during World War I with its growth rate increasing during the famine of 1921–1922. Minors arrested by the Russian police stood at 6% of all people apprehended in 1920, and reached 10% by the first quarter of 1922. More than any other factor, hunger prompted waifs to steal. Abandoned children arriving from the countryside were often slower to embrace thievery than those from urban backgrounds, but in general, the longer a child was left astray, the more likely he or she was to succumb to crime. Gangs would operate in groups as large as thirty to assure successful pickpocketing and other forms of robbery. Tobacco, drug, and alcohol addictions were common, and the first half of the 1920s saw the influx of a larger supply of cocaine as well as the development of a more extensive network of drug dealers. Urchins lived and worked in the midst of this network and drug expenses spurred on juveniles' thefts. The street introduced large percentages of its inhabitants to early sexual activity. Waifs generally began their sex lives by the age of fourteen, many girls as early as seven. Many contracted sexually transmitted diseases, and rape was common. Crime, drugs, sex, and the harsh nature of life on the street had a lasting impact. Besprizornye developed qualities considered undesirable by the rest of society, and had a range of mental and physical health issues.

Following the October Revolution the new Bolshevik government proposed that the state should take on the task of raising not just orphans but all the nation's children. Communist pedagogy aimed to create a "vast communistic movement among minors." Narkompros (People's Commissariat of Education) was tasked with providing for homeless children and managing orphanages. Children were provided with necessities, received education (including in communist doctrine), and were expected to help with chores and decision making. The orphanages were inaugurated in a spirit of revolutionary idealism, but were soon overwhelmed by the need to feed and house millions of homeless children.

By the mid-1920s, the Soviet state was forced to realize that its resources for orphanages were inadequate, that it lacked the capacity to raise and educate the USSR's stray children. The Soviet government now initiated new policies. The state reached out to society for assistance. Foster care by private families was promoted as a partial solution. Night shelters were used in some locations.

During the second half of the 1920s, the conditions of orphanages improved significantly, but deficiencies remained. The Soviet state succeeded in saving stray children, but its mission of socialist upbringing stagnated.

In the aftermath of the Russian Revolution and Russian Civil War, Anton Makarenko established self-supporting orphanages for street children.

== Children of "enemies of the people", 1937–1945 ==
The mid-1930s witnessed the peak of persecution of perceived political enemies, with millions of Soviet citizens imprisoned and hundreds of thousands executed. Up until 1937, there were no specific guidelines on how to treat the children of these "enemies of the people". Yet after the Great Purge there were "...at least several hundred thousand children [who] lost their parents". Now the government was forced to confront the problem of managing this new category of orphans.

In 1937, the Politburo decided to accommodate children of the enemies of the people in normal orphanages administered by the Narkompros. Educational staff underwent training by the NKVD (People's Commissariat of Internal Affairs), and the orphans' names were kept on record.

There were no official orders to discriminate against children of enemies of the people, yet orphanage staff often beat, underfed, and abused such pupils. Any misbehavior was understood as the product of a counter-revolutionary upbringing, and punished harshly. Treating children like budding criminals had diverse effects. In some cases, the induced "class guilt" inspired orphans to prove their loyalty to the ideals of Communism, but in other cases abusive treatment incited resentment toward the state.

If judged to be "socially dangerous," the NKVD sent orphans to either a colony for young delinquents or a Gulag labor camp. The tendency was to place all difficult orphans in colonies, which sought to re-educate children using a labor regime. Children over fifteen were liable for at least five years in camp for being a "family member of a traitor to the motherland".

== War orphans, 1945–1953 ==
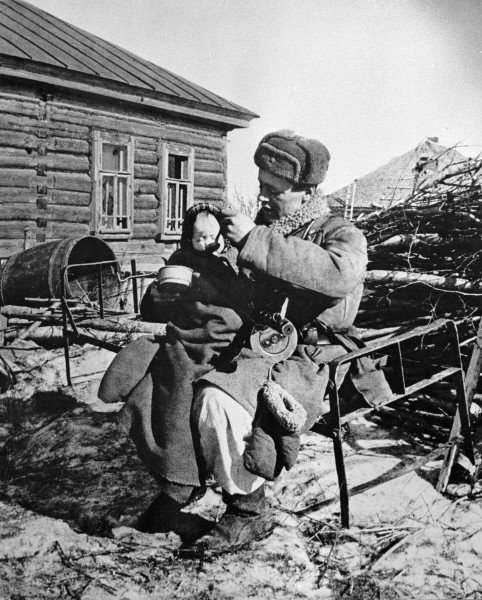
Red Army soldier with a child whose mother was killed in the war, Russia, 1943

With World War II came a new wave of orphans. After 1945, the NKVD was responsible for accommodating 2.5 million homeless children. However, the war softened attitudes towards bereaved children, a shift which eventually led to the improvement of the welfare system. The public regarded war orphans as innocent victims rather than subversives, and many citizens dedicated themselves to providing relief. There was a reversal of the previous era's stigma; adults caught in occupied zones did not pass their criminality on to their children. The state nurtured these children alongside other war orphans.

Orphanages now focused on making children feel at home. Special orphanages were built exclusively for children of officers and soldiers. Soviet trade unions and the Komsomol supported these homes with additional funding. In 1944, the government placed legal protection on the property of orphans. Developments like these reflect the leverage of children orphaned by war. In the words of one girl, "We used to dwell on our rights… we're not to be blamed for having lost everything in the war!" In 1949, the Council of Ministers of USSR created the decree "On Measures to Further Improve the Operation of Children's Homes" to provide the appropriate funds to orphanages. Wartime shortages meant that most orphanages were still undersupplied, but children fostered a sense of patriotic sacrifice as opposed to resentment towards the state.

Adoption as well as long-term fostering and short-term fostering became popular during the war. From 1941 to 1945, 200,000 children were adopted in the Soviet Union. 'Model workers' featured in propaganda were often adoptive parents. Courts preferred to place children with families, taking into account the importance of love, security, and happiness in childhood. The population of homeless children declined in the years after the war, largely due to the public's participation in the foster care system.

German children in Kaliningrad region annexed in 1945 didn't obtain state help during some period; some of them survived in Lithuania.

== Orphans after Stalin, 1953–1991 ==
The government's approach to child homelessness continued to advance in the decades following Stalin's death. During the 1960s–1980s, rising prosperity reduced the orphan population, easing the problem of overcrowding. Most 'orphans' actually had parents, but left their families due to abuse or lack of security. These factors contributed to the shift from orphanages to boarding schools beginning in the mid-1950s. The Communist Party lauded such schools for combining education with labor regimes to produce hardworking Soviet citizens. In the 20th Congress of the CPSU, Khrushchev called boarding schools "schools of the future". He launched a long-term campaign in 1959 to expand the boarding network. Many orphanages were converted into schools, while the remainder became more exclusively refuges for handicapped children. A positive effect of integrating homeless children with other school children was the further de-stigmatization of orphans.

This period experienced a continuation of the previous era's endorsement of foster care and adoption. Perestroika and glasnost ended press censorship, exposing the decrepit state of orphanages to the public. Journalists contrasted the spiritual warmth of family life to cold institutions. This, in conjunction with Gorbachev's partial marketization in 1987, spurred the creation of private children's charities. Adoption was now the favored solution to child homelessness, providing children with permanent and stable homes.

During the second half of the 20th century, there was a shift in Soviet law enforcement, from pure punitive and "resocialization" approach to crime prevention, which also targeted social orphanhood. Decrees such as the 1981 "On Measures to Strengthen State Assistance to Families with Children" reflect these changes. Parents became increasingly responsible for their children's misdeeds. In the late eighties, a young offender was commonly characterized as "an adolescent deprived of family warmth". The number of children sent to penal colonies decreased in favor of re-education programs. Special boarding schools were created for juvenile offenders.

As the Soviet Union moved toward its dissolution, the orphan population began to rise once more. In 1988, 48,000 children were classified as homeless; in 1991, this number climbed to 59,000. The economic downturn, ethnic conflicts, and food shortages contributed to these statistics. Poverty defined the plight of family life in the years to come.

== See also ==
- Orphans in Russia after the collapse of the Soviet Union

== Sources ==
- Ball, Alan (1993). "State Children: Soviet Russia's Besprizornye and the New Socialist Generation". The Russian Review. 52 (2): 228–247. doi:10.2307/131345. JSTOR 131345.
- Ball, Alan M. (1994). And Now My Soul Is Hardened: Abandoned Children in Soviet Russia, 1918-1930. University of California Press. ISBN 978-0-520-20694-6.
- Lewis Siegelbaum (2012). "1921: Homeless Children". Seventeen Moments in Soviet History. Archived from the original on 18 June 2013.
