= NKVD Order No. 00689 =

1938 Soviet government document

NKVD Order № 00689 partially recalled the NKVD Order № 00486 about "traitor of Motherland family members".

As an element of the rollback of Yezhovshchina, the order (signed by Lavrenty Beria on October 17, 1938) instructed to arrest only those wives who were informed about the counter-revolutionary activity of their husbands or there was information about their "political untrustworthy and socially dangerous attitudes or utterances". The requirement of simultaneous arrests was also reversed. The implementation for those not relieved by this order remained the same.

- Full text for 00689 in Russian language
