= On Class Origins =

1967 scholarly article by Yu Luoke

- Chinese: 出身论
- Author: Yu Luoke
- Published: January 1967
- Main idea: Challenged the "blood lineage theory"

"On Class Origins" (Chinese: 出身论; pinyin: Chūshēn lùn), alternatively translated as "On Family Background", Theory of Class Pedigree, is an article by Yu Luoke and published in January 1967 in the Journal of Middle-School Cultural Revolution. In this article, he challenged the "blood lineage theory" propagated by the children of senior Chinese Communist Party officials. At that time, this theory was widely circulated in Chinese society and caused serious adverse effects.

Yu Luoke was accused of being a counter-revolutionary and sentenced to death for his famous treatise "On Class Origins".

Yu Luoke's article echoed the Central Cultural Revolution Group's critique of the "blood lineage theory", which caused a huge reaction throughout China. In April 1967, the article was labeled a "big poisonous weed". On January 5, 1968, Yu was arrested and imprisoned, and on March 5, 1970, he was executed.

== Evaluations ==
Some Chinese experts and scholars describe "On Class Origins" as China's Manifesto of Human Rights.

Chinese-American historian Song Yongyi considers "On Class Origins" to be a "human rights declaration in the dark".

"On Class Origins'" marked the first independent thinking in China in the 1960s that broke through the ideological framework of the Cultural Revolution, focusing not on the so-called "political line" that dominated students during the Cultural Revolution, but on real social problems. Yu Luoke's thoughts were advanced at that time, and were criticized not only by the Red Guards who advocated the "blood lineage theory", but also criticized by many rebel student organizations.

== See also ==
- Cultural Revolution
