= Bloodline theory =

Political theory among Loyalist Faction Red Guards

The bloodline theory (simplified Chinese: 血统论; traditional Chinese: 血統論; pinyin: xuètǒng lùn) or blood lineage theory was a political theory associated with the "Loyalist Faction" (Baohuang Pai) of the Red Guards during the early phase of the Cultural Revolution in the People's Republic of China. Opponents included the "Rebel Faction" (Zaofan Pai) of the Red Guards.

According to the bloodline theory, the defining factor in a person's class standing was their family's class position. It was expressed by the bloodline couplet, "from a revolutionary father a hero, from a reactionary father a bastard." Although this position was politically discredited, it continued to have a political impact during the Cultural Revolution.

== Definition ==
According to the bloodline theory, the defining factor in a person's class standing was their family's class position. Regardless of a person's current position, they could not be considered as among the revolutionary people unless their family background was that of the poor or middle peasants, proletariat, or soldiers and would instead be considered among the so-called Five Black Categories. In some instances, the criteria for Red Guard membership were so exacting that for purposes of the bloodline theory, family background would be traced back to grandparents or distant relatives.

The essence of the bloodline theory was summarized by the slogan, "from a revolutionary father a hero, from a reactionary father a bastard." Other permutations of this bloodline couplet included the phrase, "it is basically like this" or the phrase "it is exactly like this," suggesting that advocates of the bloodline theory may have disagreed about the weight that it should have.

== Development and rejection ==
In the period after the success of the Chinese Communist Revolution, the newly founded People's Republic of China had to address the building of socialist governance, norms, and order. These state building tasks involved questions of who the next leaders would be and where they would be found (i.e., among families that had already included revolutionary leaders, or among the youth).

Under normal circumstances, the Chinese Communist Party (CCP)'s policy was that individuals should not be judged on family class background alone, but rather by their political performance. At the Cultural Revolution's outset, questions of legacy or succession reached their peak, with some children of senior cadre criticized the emphasis on political performance as part of Peng Zhen's "revisionist class line."

The bloodline theory began in secondary schools and spread from there to universities. In late July 1966, variations of the bloodline couplet began appearing among Red Guard groups, with several different student groups claiming to have originated it. In the view of these early Red Guards (also known as "Old Red Guards"), class origin was the most important criteria for group membership. In descending order of status, these were: (1) children of army officials, (2) children of civilian state cadres, (3) children with working-class family backgrounds, and (4) children from peasant backgrounds. Anyone not from "red origins" would be excluded, and those with the "purest bloodline" were still viewed in a hierarchy.

The bloodline couplet caused major controversy. Shortly after its appearance, arguments broke out primarily within the ranks of Red Guard students over how to interpret the principle. The bloodline theory was initially widespread among student activists during the Cultural Revolution, but was then strongly criticized by the Maoists. Significant public opposition to the bloodline theory began in late 1966.

Chen Boda was the first Maoist leader to criticize the bloodline couplet, stating, "A theory of 'born-redness' has become popular lately. Those advancing this fallacy actually have attacked and marginalized the children of workers and peasants ... They confuse some students and encourage them to present the couplet, 'If the father is a hero, the son is also a hero.'" Jiang Qing famously inverted the bloodline theory's slogan, and argued that if parents were revolutionaries then their children should follow their example, but if parents were reactionaries, then their children should rebel. In 1966, middle school student Yu Luoke wrote a popular pamphlet, On Class Origins, that played a significant role in discrediting the bloodline theory.

== Subsequent interpretations ==
In the view of academic Alessandro Russo, the bloodline theory was a form of "biological classism" and "ideological trick" which ultimately failed because of how widespread political participation was during the early phase of the Cultural Revolution. Russo writes that even after the theory was politically discredited, it continued to have an impact during the Cultural Revolution.

Historian Rebecca Karl observes that the bloodline theory had the "curious effect of casting suspicion on the vast majority of the old revolutionaries. After all, the nucleus of the CCP back in the 1920s and 1930s had been urban, educated youths along with some offspring of landlord or rich peasant families (for example, Mao himself)."

== See also ==
- Ancestral sin
- Hereditarianism
- Sippenhaft
- Songbun
