= Curse of the Braganzas =

Myth about the former Portuguese ruling dynasty

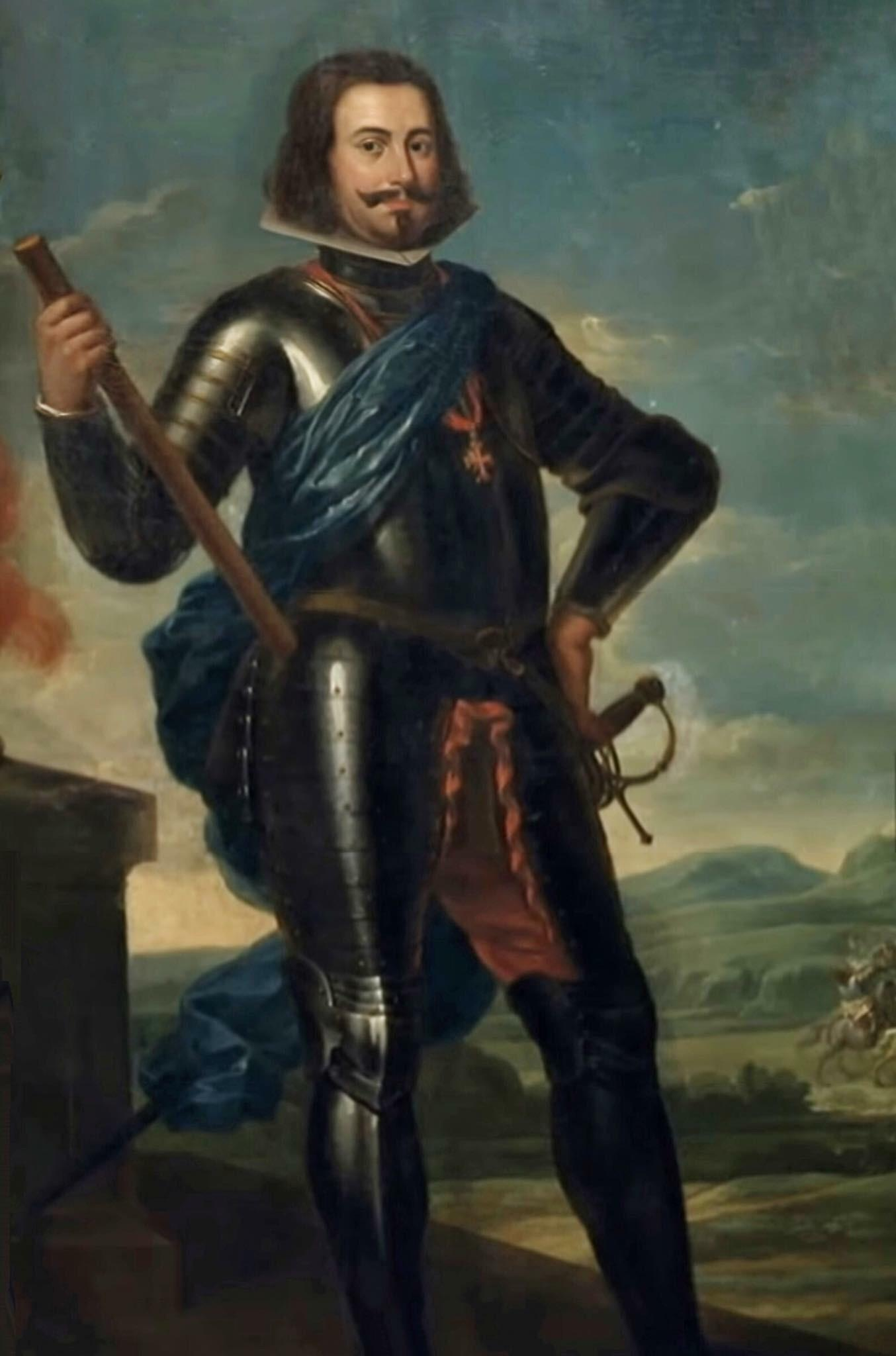
King John IV of Portugal, the first Braganza to reign.

The Curse of the Braganzas (in Portuguese a Maldição dos Braganças) is a myth, referred to in several historical chronicles, concerning the House of Braganza, that ruled the Kingdom of Portugal (1640–1910), the United Kingdom of Portugal, Brazil and the Algarves (1815–1822) and the Empire of Brazil (1822–1889) and, therefore, all the Portuguese Overseas Empire.

This "curse" began in the reign of king John IV of Portugal, in the 17th century, when the monarch allegedly kicked a Franciscan friar who was begging for alms. In reply, the friar cast a curse, saying that never again would a first-born male of his family live long enough to reach the throne. Since then—with three exceptions—all the first-born males of this dynasty died before they reigned.

With the end of the Braganzas' reigns, firstly in Brazil (1889) and later in Portugal (1910), the curse appears to have ended.

== Alleged victims ==
=== In Portugal ===
- Theodosius (1634–1653) - King John IV first-born child, died 3 years before his father and it was his younger brother, Afonso VI who succeeded in the throne;
- John (1688–1688) – King Peter II first-born child, lived less than a year and it was his younger brother, John V, who succeeded in the throne;
- Peter (1712–1714) – King John V first-born child, died when he was two and it was his younger brother, Joseph I, who succeeded in the throne. Joseph didn’t have any male issue and it was his daughter, Maria I, who succeeded him;
- Joseph (1761–1788) – Queen Maria I first-born child, died before his mother and it was his younger brother, John VI, who succeeded in the throne;
- Francis Anthony (1795–1801) – King John VI first-born child, he was 6 when he died and it was his younger brother, Pedro IV, who succeeded in the throne.
- Michael (1820) - King Peter IV first-born child, died at birth and it was his older sister, Maria II, who succeeded in the Portuguese throne.
- Louis Philip (1887–1908) – King Charles I first-born child, murdered together with his father on 1 February 1908 and it was his younger brother, Manuel II, who succeeded in the throne.

=== In Brazil ===
- Michael (1820) – Emperor Peter I first-born child, died at birth and it was his younger brother, Peter II, who succeeded in the Brazilian throne.
- Alphonse (1845–1847) – Emperor Peter II first-born child, died when he was two and it was his sister, Isabel, who succeeded him as the Empire’s heir.

== Exceptions ==
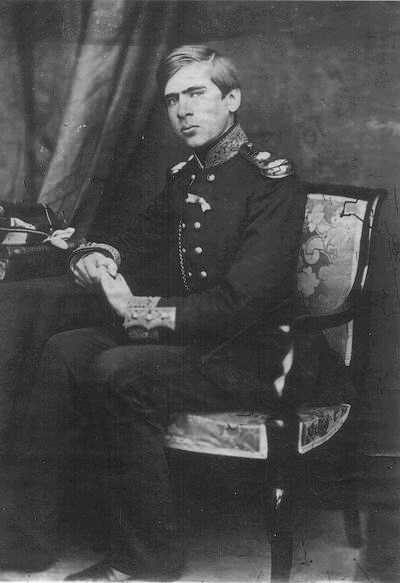
King Peter V of Portugal

=== In Portugal ===
- Peter V (1837–1861) - first-born child of Queen Maria II, was an exception; he became king in 1853, when he was sixteen. However, he died some years later, in 1861, when he was only twenty four, childless. He was succeeded by his younger brother Louis I;
- Charles I (1863–1908) - first-born child of King Louis I, was the second exception; he became king in 1889 but was murdered in 1908 together with his older son. He was succeeded by his younger son Manuel II, the last King of Portugal.

=== In Brazil ===
- Pedro Augusto, Prince of Brazil and of Saxe-Coburg and Gotha (1866–1934) - first-born child of Princess Leopoldina, was also an exception; he was the heir apparent of the Imperial throne until 1875, when Leopoldina’s older sister (Princess Isabel) finally gave birth to an heir. In spite of the fact that he was considered an exception to the family curse, the so-called "cursed prince" became psychologically ill and attempted suicide, dying single in a sanatorium in Vienna.

== Curiosities ==
- One century after this curse, King John VI and his consort Charlotte of Bourbon, tried to reverse it, visiting annually Franciscan monasteries first in Lisbon and later in Rio de Janeiro.

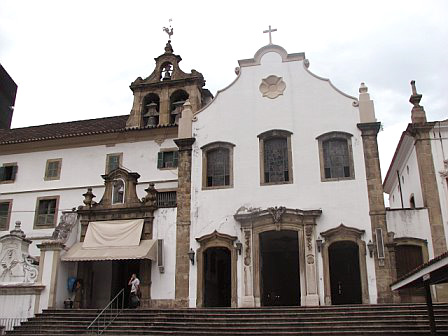
"Convento de Santo Antônio", in Rio de Janeiro.

- All the first-born children that died in Brazil due to the curse were buried in “Convento de Santo Antônio”, a Franciscan monastery in Rio de Janeiro.
- This curse also affected the illegitimate children of Pedro I of Brazil. It was the case of:
  - unknown name, a stillborn with the marchioness of Santos;
  - Pedro, his first-born child with Noémi Thierry, died before he reached a year old;
  - unknown name, a stillborn with the Uruguayan María del Carmen García.
- Although this curse refers only to male descendants, some Portuguese infantas and Brazilian princesses were also "victims". That’s the case of:
  - Isabel Louise (1669–1690) - King Peter II first-born daughter (from the King’s first marriage), died single before her father;
  - Louise Victoria (1874) – Princess Isabel's first-born child, stillborn.

== Post-monarchy period ==
=== In Portugal ===
- Concerning the descendants of King Charles I:
  - his second son, King Manuel II died in 1932, childless, in exile;
  - King Carlos’ allegedly natural daughter, Maria Pia of Saxe-Coburg and Braganza, also died of natural causes, at 88 years old.
- The line of succession passed, then, to King Miguel descendants. His only son, Miguel (II) had three sons:
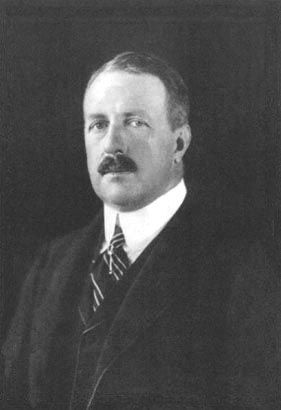
  Pedro de Alcântara, Prince of Grão-Pará.
  - Miguel (abdicated and married to an American commoner);
  - Francis Joseph (died childless before his father); and
  - Duarte Nuno who succeeded his father as Duke of Braganza.

=== In Brazil ===
- Concerning the descendants of Princess Isabel:
  - her first-born son, Pedro de Alcântara, abdicated his rights to make an unequal marriage;
  - his brother, Luís became Imperial Prince but died before his mother in 1920;
  - his oldest son, Prince Pedro Henrique, became the Imperial heir, following Isabel’s death (1921);
- More recently, Prince Pedro Luíz, Prince Antônio first born child died in the crash of Air France Flight 447, on 1 June 2009.

== Bibliography ==
- (in Portuguese) ”Nobreza de Portugal e do Brasil" – Vol. I & Vol. II. Published by Zairol Lda., Lisbon 1989.
