= Ancestral sin =

Doctrine that the sins of one's ancestors lead to the punishment of their descendants

Ancestral sin, generational sin, or ancestral fault (Koine Greek: προπατορικὴ ἁμαρτία; προπατορικὸν ἁμάρτημα; προγονικὴ ἁμαρτία) is the doctrine that teaches that individuals inherit the judgement for the sin of their ancestors. It exists primarily as a concept in Mediterranean religions (e.g. in Christian hamartiology); generational sin is referenced in the Bible in Exodus 20:5.

The classical scholar Martin West draws a distinction between an ancestral curse and an inherited guilt, punishment, adversity or genetic corruption.

== Background ==
The most detailed discussion of the concept is found in Proclus's De decem dubitationibus circa Providentiam (5th-century AD), a propaedeutic handbook for students at the Neoplatonic Academy in Athens. Proclus makes clear that the concept is of hallowed antiquity, and making sense of the apparent paradox is presented as a defense of ancient Greek religion. The main point made is that a city or a family is to be seen as a single living being (animal unum, zoion hen) more sacred than any individual human life.

The doctrine of ancestral fault is similarly presented as a tradition of immemorial antiquity in ancient Greek religion by Celsus in his True Doctrine (2nd-century AD), a polemic against Christianity. Celsus is quoted as attributing to "a priest of Apollo or of Zeus" the saying that "the mills of the gods grind slowly, even to children's children, and to those who are born after them". The idea of divine justice taking the form of collective punishment is also ubiquitous in the Hebrew Bible, e.g. the Ten Plagues of Egypt, the destruction of Shechem, etc., and most notably the recurring punishments inflicted on the Israelites for lapsing from Yahwism.

== Teaching by religion ==
=== In Christianity ===
The Bible speaks of generational sin in Exodus 20:5, which states that "the iniquities of the fathers are visited upon the sons and daughters—unto the third and fourth generation." This concept implies that "unresolved issues get handed down from generation to generation", but that "Jesus is the bondage breaker ... [and] He is able to break the cycle of this curse, but only if we want Him to."

The formalized Christian doctrine of original sin is a direct extension of the concept of ancestral sin (imagined as inflicted on a number of succeeding generations), arguing that the sin of Adam and Eve is inflicted on all their descendants indefinitely, i.e. on the entire human race. It was first developed in the 2nd century by Irenaeus, the Bishop of Lyon, in his struggle against Gnosticism. Irenaeus contrasted their doctrine with the view that the Fall was a step in the wrong direction by Adam, with whom, Irenaeus believed, his descendants had some solidarity or identity.

Ezekiel 18:19-23 states "the son shall not bear the iniquity of the father, neither shall the father bear the iniquity of the son; the righteousness of the righteous shall be upon him, and the wickedness of the wicked shall be upon him."

==== Eastern Orthodoxy ====
Ancestral sin is the object of a Christian doctrine taught by the Orthodox Church as well as other Eastern Christians. Some identify it as "inclination towards sin, a heritage from the sin of our progenitors". But most distinguish it from this tendency that remains even in baptized persons, since ancestral sin "is removed through baptism".

Saint Gregory Palamas taught that, as a result of ancestral sin (called "original sin" in the West), man's image was tarnished, disfigured, as a consequence of Adam's disobedience. The Greek theologian John Karmiris writes that "the sin of the first man, together with all of its consequences and penalties, is transferred by means of natural heredity to the entire human race. Since every human being is a descendant of the first man, 'no one of us is free from the spot of sin, even if he should manage to live a completely sinless day'. ... Original Sin not only constitutes 'an accident' of the soul; but its results, together with its penalties, are transplanted by natural heredity to the generations to come. And thus, from the one historical event of the first sin of the first-born man, came the present situation of sin being imparted, together with all of the consequences thereof, to all natural descendants of Adam."

==== Roman Catholicism ====
With regard to breaking generational curses, clergy of the Catholic Charismatic Renewal have developed prayers for healing.

The Catechism of the Catholic Church, the Greek translation of which uses "προπατορική αμαρτία" (literally, 'ancestral sin') where the Latin text has "peccatum originale", states: "Original sin is called 'sin' only in an analogical sense: it is a sin 'contracted' and not 'committed'—a state and not an act. Although it is proper to each individual, original sin does not have the character of a personal fault in any of Adam's descendants." Eastern Orthodox teaching likewise says: "It can be said that while we have not inherited the guilt of Adam's personal sin, because his sin is also of a generic nature, and because the entire human race is possessed of an essential, ontological unity, we participate in it by virtue of our participation in the human race. 'The imparting of Original Sin by means of natural heredity should be understood in terms of the unity of the entire human nature, and of the homoousiotitos of all men, who, connected by nature, constitute one mystic whole. Inasmuch as human nature is indeed unique and unbreakable, the imparting of sin from the first-born to the entire human race descended from him is rendered explicable: "Explicitly, as from the root, the sickness proceeded to the rest of the tree, Adam being the root who had suffered corruption" (Saint Cyril of Alexandria).'"

==== Evangelical-Lutheranism ====
The Evangelical-Lutheran Churches teach:

Not only was the guilt of Adam imputed to his descendants,1 but his children and children’s children have inherited from their first ancestor his corrupt nature, being flesh born of the flesh, wholly depraved, totally blind of understanding in spiritual things, of perverse appetites, their will opposed to the will of God and only prone to evil, all their faculties enslaved in the service of sin,8 without any ability in any measure to work their own spiritual restoration.

==== Methodism ====
In Article VII of the Articles of Religion, the Methodist Churches teach the doctrine of original sin, "the corruption of the nature of every man, that naturally is engendered of the offspring of Adam, whereby man is very far gone from original righteousness, and of his own nature inclined to evil, and that continually." When a believer is entirely sanctified, original sin is eradicated and the believer is made perfect in love.

With respect to generational curses, the Methodist Church in Singapore teaches that "God showers mercy on those who love Him and keep His commandments"; it also holds that "God also warns that if the people do not follow the commandments and turn away, there will be the danger of false forms of worship which will have profound consequences for future generations—their children and grandchildren will not be properly instructed regarding the covenant relationship with God and with one another." Parents who do not heed God's commandements in particular areas of their lives will "nurture children who turn away from God in these same areas." Holding that Galatians 3:13 teaches that Jesus redeemed humankind from curses, Methodism teaches that "If we repent of our sins—including the ones we learnt from our parents (which they learnt from their parents before them)—turn towards God and are serious about cooperating with the Holy Spirit to live a new life in Christ, we can be set free from the effects of this universal curse."

The Wesleyan Methodist Church likewise teaches that "Jesus Christ made it possible by breaking the curse of sin through the cross" and that it is the free will of the believer "to walk in that victory."

=== Judaism ===
The Hebrew Bible provides two passages of scripture regarding generational curses:

The Lord, the Lord, compassionate and gracious God, slow to anger, abounding in loving-kindness and truth ... Yet he does not leave the guilty unpunished; he punishes the children and their children for the sin of the parents to the third and fourth generation.

— Exodus 34:7

Parents are not to be put to death for their children, nor children put to death for their parents; each will die for their own sin.

— Deuteronomy 24:16

The Talmud rejects the idea that people can be justly punished for another person's sins and Judaism in general upholds the idea of individual responsibility. One interpretation is that, even though there is no moral guilt for descendants, they may be negatively impacted as a consequence of their forebear's actions.

=== Hinduism ===
Some holy writing in Hinduism states,

The thin bamboo rod in the hand of the Brahmana is mightier than the thunderbolt of Indra. The thunder scorches all existing objects upon which it falls. The Brahmana's rod (which symbolizes the Brahmana's might in the form of his curse) blasts even unborn generations. The might of the rod is derived from Mahadeva.

— Anushasana Parva

Hinduism has family curses, elsewhere.

=== Japanese Shinto ===
Although Shinto has its own view of sin, ancestral sin is not one opted for. Instead, Shinto pushes for all humans being inherently pure, with any accumulated sin, or kegare, being what is accumulated in one's current life. These are to be removed purification rituals, such as harae.

=== Greek mythology ===
In Greek mythology, the Erinyes exacted family curses. Certain dynasties have had tragic occurrences happen upon them.

The House of Cadmus, who established and ruled over the city of Thebes, was one such house. After slaying the dragon and establishing Thebes upon the earth that the dragon terrorized, Ares cursed Cadmus and his descendants because of the dragon's sacredness to Ares. Similarly, after Hephaestus discovered his wife, Aphrodite, having a sexual affair with Ares, he became enraged and vowed to avenge himself for Aphrodite's infidelity by cursing the lineage of any children that resulted from the affair. Aphrodite later bore a daughter, Harmonia, the wife of Cadmus, from Ares' seed.

Cadmus, annoyed at his accursed life and ill fate, remarked that if the gods were so enamoured of the life of a serpent, he might as well wish that life for himself. Immediately Cadmus began to grow scales and change into a serpent. Harmonia, after realizing the fate of her husband, begged the gods to let her share her husband's fate. Of the House of Cadmus, many had particularly tragic lives and deaths. For example, King Minos of Crete's wife fall madly in love with the Cretan Bull and bore the Minotaur. Minos would later be murdered by his daughters whilst bathing. Semele, the mother of Dionysus by Zeus, was turned into dust because she glanced upon Zeus's true godly form. King Laius of Thebes was killed by his son, Oedipus. Oedipus later (unknowingly) marries the queen, his own mother, and becomes king. After finding out he gouges his eyes and exiles himself from Thebes.

Another dynasty that was cursed and was subject to tragic occurrences was the House of Atreus (also known as the Atreides). The curse begins with Tantalus, a son of Zeus who enjoyed cordial relations with the gods. To test the omniscience of the gods, Tantalus decided to slay his son Pelops and feed him to the gods as a test of their omniscience. All of the gods, save Demeter, who was too concerned with the abduction of her daughter Persephone by Hades, knew not to eat from Pelops's cooked corpse. After Demeter had eaten Pelops's shoulder, the gods banished Tantalus into Tartarus where he would spend eternity standing in a pool of water beneath a fruit-bearing tree with low branches. Whenever he would reach for a fruit, the branches would lift upward so as to remove his intended meal from his grasp. Whenever he would bend over to drink from the pool, the water would recedes into the earth before he could drink. The gods brought Pelops back to life, replacing the bone in his shoulder with a bit of ivory with the help of Hephaestus, thus marking the family forever afterwards.

Pelops would later marry Princess Hippodamia after winning a chariot race against her father, King Oenomaus. Pelops won the race by sabotaging of King Oenomaus’ chariot, with the help of the king's servant, Myrtilus. This resulted in King Oenomaus’s death. Later, the servant Myrtilus, who was in love with Hippodamia, was killed by Pelops because Pelops had promised Myrtilus the right to take Hippodamia's virginity in exchange for his help in sabotaging the king's chariot. As Myrtilus died, he cursed Pelops and his line, further adding to the curse on the House of Atreus.

King Atreus, the son of Pelops and the namesake of the Atreidies, would later be killed by his nephew, Aegisthus. Before his death, Atreus had two sons, King Agamemnon of Mycenae and King Menelaus of Sparta. King Menelaus's wife, Helen of Sparta, would leave him for Prince Paris of Troy, thus beginning the Trojan War. However, prior to their sailing off for the war, Agamemnon had angered the goddess Artemis by killing one of her sacred deer. As Agamemnon prepared to sail to Troy to avenge his brother's shame, Artemis stilled the winds so that the Greek fleet could not sail. The seer Calchas told Agamemnon that if he wanted to appease Artemis and sail to Troy, he would have to sacrifice the most precious thing in his possession. Agamemnon sent word home for his daughter Iphigenia to come to him so that he may sacrifice her, framing it to her that she was to be married to Achilles. Iphigenia, honored by her father's asking her to join him in the war, complied. Agamemnon sacrificed his daughter and went off to war.

Clytemnestra, the wife of Agamemnon and mother to Iphigenia, was so enraged by her husband's actions that when he returned victorious from Troy, she trapped him in a robe with no opening for his head whilst he was bathing and stabbed him to death as he thrashed about. Orestes, the son of Agamemnon and Clytemnestra, was torn between his duty toward avenging his father's death and his sparing his mother. However. after praying to Apollo for consultation, Apollo advised him to kill his mother. Orestes killed his mother and wandered the land, ridden with guilt. Because of the noble act of avenging his father's at the expense of his own soul and reluctance to kill his mother, Orestes was forgiven by the gods, thus ending the curse of the House of Atreus.

=== Witchcraft ===
The term witchcraft is not well-defined but, at least within factions, the belief in family curses persists. In paganism, the common belief is that curses passed down through family may present itself through personal misfortune, such as addiction and poverty. Another includes karmic debt, a concept suggesting that actions in one's own past life—especially negative ones—carry on with them through reincarnation. Through personal self improvement and reflection on not only one's past, but their lineage, one may free themselves from a curse.

== Skeptical views ==
Modern skeptics deny that curses of any nature, including family curses, even exist, even if some fervently believe in them.

Modern Western attitudes to personal individuality and to individual achievement do not always sit well with notions of inherited sin. Psychologists and philosophers tend to portray persistent human failings as part of human nature, rather than using "original sin" metaphors.

== Historical examples ==
Nathaniel Hawthorne felt that his family was cursed because of the actions of two of his ancestors, John Hathorne and his father William. William Hathorne was a judge who earned a reputation for cruelly persecuting Quakers, and in 1662, he ordered the public whipping of Ann Coleman. John Hathorne was one of the leading judges in the Salem witch trials. He is not known to have repented for his actions. So great were Nathaniel Hawthorne's feelings of guilt, he re-spelled his last name Hathorne to Hawthorne.

=== Famous examples ===
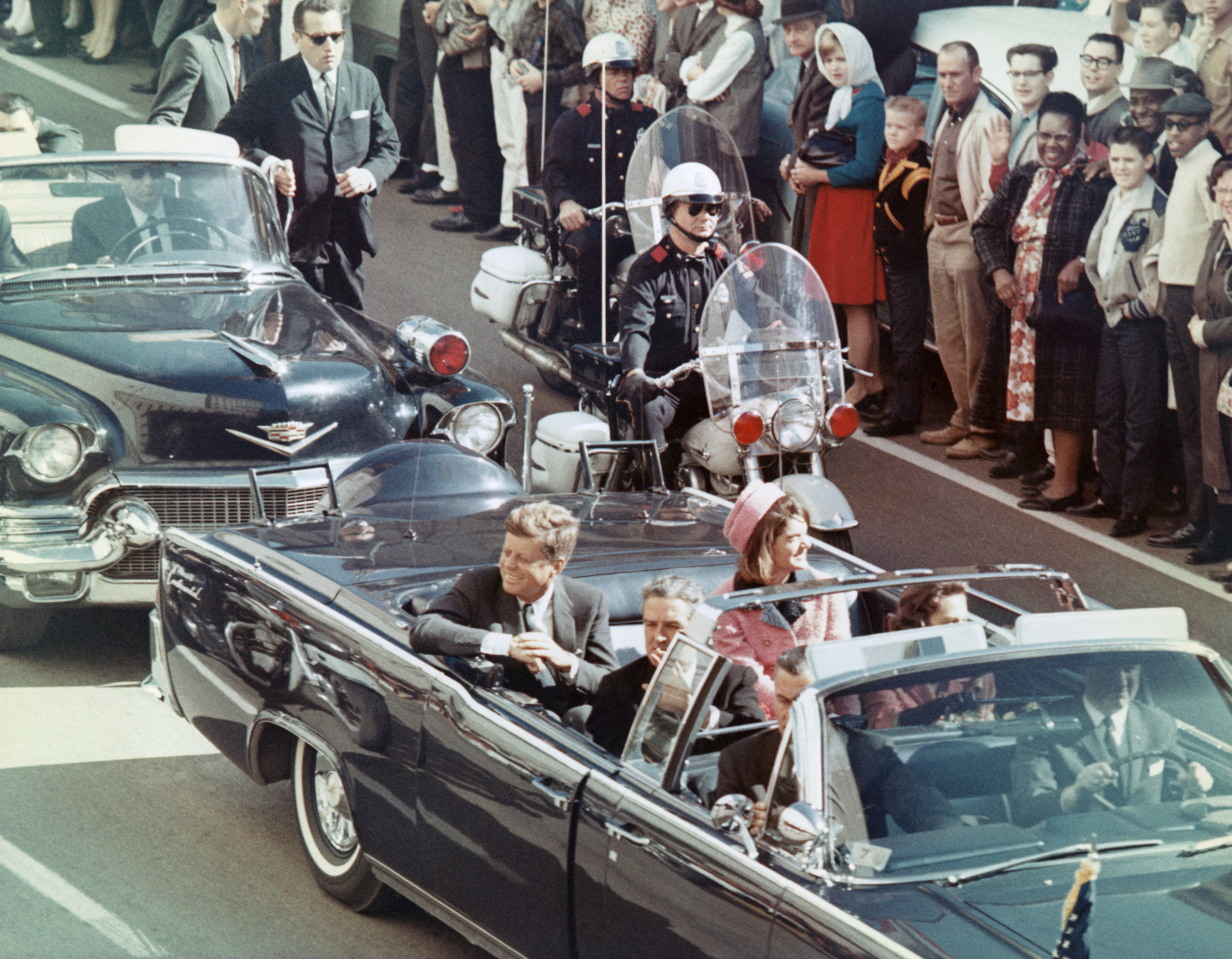
John Fitzgerald Kennedy, with his wife, Jacqueline, and Texas Governor John Connally with his wife, Nellie, in the presidential limousine, minutes before Kennedy was assassinated. Some allege there may be a curse on the Kennedy family.

- The curse of the Alcmaeonidae
- The Curse of the Braganzas (from John IV of Portugal to Louis Philip)
- The Curse of Tippecanoe; not quite a family curse, as it relates to occupational succession, not genetic, but deserves mention
- The Kennedy curse (from Joseph P. Kennedy Jr. to Maeve Kennedy McKean)
- The Dangbar Family
- The Sedgwick family
- The Von Erich family
- The family of Bruce Lee, also known as "The Curse of the Dragon" (Bruce Lee and Brandon Lee)
- The House of Grimaldi is said to have been cursed for their conquest of the Rock of Monaco, although stories differ as to how they were cursed.

== Family curses in fiction ==
As he lies dying, in Shakespeare's Romeo and Juliet Mercutio says, "A plague o' both your houses", blaming both the Capulets and Montagues. As the play progresses, his words prove prophetic.

There is a family curse in The House of the Seven Gables.

In Louis Sachar's novel Holes, the protagonist Stanley Yelnats is subject to a family curse passed down from his great-great-grandfather, who failed to uphold a promise to a Romani woman.

In Arthur Conan Doyle's The Hound of the Baskervilles, it was thought that the Baskerville family had a legendary family curse, of a giant black hound, "... a foul thing, a great, black beast, shaped like a hound, yet larger than any hound that ever mortal eye has rested upon."

In the 2007 South Korean psychological-supernatural suspense horror film Someone Behind You, a young woman named Ga-In (Yoon-Jin-seo) sees families and friends slaughtering and attacking one another and realizes that she is followed by an inexplicable curse causing those around her to get rid of her. Despite all of this she is constantly reminded by an eerie student never to trust her family, her friends, or even herself. Ga-In has hallucinations of those who would attempt to attack her, then sees a disturbing vision of a monstrous being warning her that the bloodshed will intensify. The film was also released in America retitled as Voices.

== See also ==
- Apostolic succession
- Blood curse
- Christian views on sin
- Concupiscence
- Curse of Ham
- Curse and mark of Cain
- Curse of Turan
- Curse of the Atreides
- Curse tablet
- Demonic possession
- Evil eye
- Exorcism in Christianity
- Haunted doll
- Jewish deicide
- Jinx
- Kindama
- La Llorona
- Pele's Curse
- Sacraments
- Sacramentals
- Sanctification
- The Scottish Play
- Superman curse
- Theology of Søren Kierkegaard
- Tutankhamun's Curse
- Usog
- Wandering Jew
