= Curse of Turan =

Related to the misfortune(s) of Hungary and Hungarians

The Curse of Turan (Hungarian: Turáni átok) is a belief that Hungarians have been under the influence of a malicious spell for many centuries. The "curse" manifests itself as inner strife, pessimism, misfortune and several historic catastrophes.

== Origin ==
There are different theories of origin. The name for the imagined “turanian people” came into existence and spread due to the works of Max Müller in Hungary, and it became a popular hypothesis in the second half of the 19th century. The first written mention of the phrase: "Turáni átok" was found in the publications of Ferenc Herczeg.

=== Saint Stephen and Christianity ===
Perhaps the most popular origin theory is that the curse resulted from Hungary's conversion to Christianity in the year AD 1000 under King Stephen. The vanquished adherents of the old Hungarian religion cast a curse upon Christian Hungary to last either forever or perhaps for 1,000 years.

=== 1848 revolution ===
Another theory is that the curse was created as legend during the 1850s in the aftermath of the failed Hungarian Revolution of 1848, and reflected the overwhelming pessimism of this repressive decade.

== National catastrophes ==
Some tragic events of Hungarian history are traditionally seen as national catastrophes, manifestations of the Curse of Turan:

- Battle of Mohi (1241) Devastating loss to invading Mongols leading to severe population depletion.
- Battle of Mohács (1526) Decisive loss to invading Turks leading to around 150 years (until 1686) of Ottoman rule in central parts of the country.
- Transfer of sovereignty from the Ottoman Empire to the Habsburg Austrian Empire (1699)
- Crushing of the 1848 Revolution (1849) Loss to Habsburg and Russian forces led to 15 years of severe repression.
- Treaty of Trianon (1920) Redefinition of borders after World War I; Hungary loses about 72% of its territory.
- World War II (1939–45) Catastrophic alliance with Axis powers.
- Hungarian Revolution of 1956 Crushed by Soviet military, led to severe reprisals and mass exodus of many Hungarians.

== Personal troubles ==
The curse has also been blamed for causing many troubles on a personal level. Among them are Hungary's high rate of suicide. Currently, Hungary is 54th in the world in suicide rate. In the mid 1980s, Hungary led this indicator. Hungarians have the third shortest life expectancy in Europe outside the countries of the former USSR.

== Etymology ==
Turan (Hungarian: Turán) derives from the Persian توران and refers to the steppes of Central Asia, land of the Tur. This root word is likely derived from the name of an ancient king, and may also be the root of "Turk". Traditionally Magyars were considered Turkic people until the end of the 18th century. In the 19th century, when the Curse of Turan was a very popular concept, artists searched for Asian characteristics in Hungarian folk art and called them "Turanic motifs".

== Literature ==
The curse became a favourite theme in Hungarian literature. A poem written in 1832 by the great 19th century Romantic poet, Mihály Vörösmarty, explains the origin of the curse as the bloody wars fought for the territory of Hungary in ancient times:

The Curse

“Men!” said the Pannon god of bane in olden times
“I bestow to you a happy land; you should fight for, if you want her.”
So great, brave nations fought dauntlessly for her,
And the Magyar won a bloody victory at last.
Oh, but contention remained on the souls of the peoples: the land
Can never become happy under this curse.

Az átok

"Férfiak!" így szólott Pannon vészistene hajdan,
"Boldog földet adok, víjatok érte, ha kell."
S víttanak elszántan nagy bátor nemzetek érte,
S véresen a diadalt végre kivítta magyar.
Ah de viszály maradott a népek lelkein: a föld
Boldoggá nem tud lenni ez átok alatt.
